= List of postal codes =

This list shows an overview of postal code notation schemes for all countries that have postal or ZIP Code systems.

== List ==
The Area format is used for large regions, such as municipalities. The Street level format is used for more specific locations, like streets or blocks. Not all countries use both formats. When both are available, the Area format usually serves as a prefix to the Street level format.

Legend

- A = letter
- N = number
- ? = letter or number
- CC = ISO 3166-1 alpha-2 country code

Country or territory	In use since / from ... to	ISO	Area format	Street level format	Note
Afghanistan	21 March 2011	AF	NNNN		The first two digits (ranging from 10 to 43) correspond to the province, while the last two digits correspond either to the city/delivery zone (range 01–50) or to the district/delivery zone (range 51–99).
Åland		AX	NNNNN, CC-NNNNN		With Finland, first two numbers are 22. CC-NNNNN used from abroad.
Albania	11 October 2006	AL	NNNN		Introduced in 2006, gradually implemented throughout 2007.
Algeria		DZ	NNNNN		First two as in ISO 3166-2:DZ
American Samoa	1 July 1963	AS	NNNNN, NNNNN-NNNN		U.S. ZIP codes (range 96799)
Andorra	31 July 2004	AD	CCNNN		Each parish now has its own post code.
Angola		AO	no codes		
Anguilla	9 October 2007	AI	AI-2640		Single code used for all addresses.
Antigua and Barbuda		AG	no codes		
Argentina	1974, modified 1999	AR	NNNN, ANNNN, ANNNNAAA		1974–1998 NNNN, and from 1999 ANNNNAAA. Codigo Postal Argentino (CPA), where the first A is the province code as in ISO 3166-2:AR, the four numbers are the old postal codes, the three last letters indicate a side of the block. Previously NNNN which is the minimum requirement as of 2006, but ANNNNAAA is not mandatory.
Armenia	1 April 2006	AM	NNNN		Previously used NNNNNN system inherited from former Soviet Union.
Aruba		AW	no codes		
Australia	1 July 1967	AU	NNNN		In general, the first digit identifies the state or territory.
Austria	1 January 1966	AT	NNNN		The first digit denotes regions, which are partly identical to one of the nine provinces—called Bundesländer; the last the nearest post office in the area.
Azerbaijan		AZ	CC NNNN		Previously used NNNNNN system inherited from former Soviet Union.
Bahamas		BS	no codes		Bahamas used Post Office system instead of Postal Code
Bahrain		BH	NNN, NNNN		Valid post code numbers are 101 to 1216 with gaps in the range. Known as block number (Arabic: رقم المجمع) formally. The first digit in NNN format and the first two digits in NNNN format refer to one of the 12 municipalities of the country. PO Box address does not need a block number or city name, just the PO Box number followed by the name of the country, Bahrain.
Bangladesh	16 December 1972	BD	NNNN		
Barbados		BB	CCNNNNN		5 digit postal code preceded by BB
Belarus		BY	NNNNNN		Retained system inherited from former Soviet Union.
Belgium		BE	NNNN		In general, the first digit gives the province.
Belize		BZ	no codes		
Benin		BJ	no codes		
Bermuda		BM	no codes	AA NN, AA AA	AA NN for street addresses, AA AA for P.O. Box addresses. The second half of the postcode identifies the street delivery walk (e.g.: Hamilton HM 12) or the PO Box number range (e.g.: Hamilton HM BX). See Postal codes in Bermuda.
Bhutan	21 February 2010	BT	NNNNN		Written Behind the village name. Digits: postal region (Dzongdey), district (Dzongkhag), sub district (Dungkhag), delivery area (two digits).
Bolivia		BO	no codes		
Bonaire, Sint Eustatius and Saba		BQ	no codes		
Bosnia and Herzegovina		BA	NNNNN		
Botswana		BW	no codes		
Brazil	31 May 1971	BR	NNNNN, NNNNN-NNN	NNNNN-NNN	NNNNN only from 1971 to 1992. Código de Endereçamento Postal (CEP): -000 to -899 are used for streets, roads, avenues, boulevards; -900 to -959 are used for buildings with a high postal use; -960 to -969 are for promotional use; -970 to -989 are post offices and regular P.O. boxes; and -990 to -998 are used for community P.O. boxes. -999 is used for special services.
British Antarctic Territory		AQ	BIQQ 1ZZ		One code for all addresses (AAAA NAA). UK territory, but not UK postcode.
British Indian Ocean Territory		IO	BBND 1ZZ		One code for all addresses (AAAA NAA). UK territory, but not UK postcode.
British Virgin Islands		VG	CCNNNN		Specifically, VG1110 through VG1160
Brunei		BN	AANNNN		
Bulgaria	1 August 1975	BG	NNNN		
Burkina Faso		BF	no codes		
Burundi		BI	no codes		
Cambodia	Updated 2017	KH	NNNNNN		Cambodia Post [EMS]
Cameroon		CM	no codes		
Canada	1971–1975	CA	ANA NAN		The system was gradually introduced starting in April 1971 in Ottawa. The letters D, F, I, O, Q, and U are not used to avoid confusion with other letters or numbers.
Cape Verde		CV	NNNN		The first digit indicates the island.
Cayman Islands		KY	CCN-NNNN		
Central African Republic		CF	no codes		
Chad		TD	no codes		
Chile		CL	NNNNNNN, NNN-NNNN		May only be required for bulk mail.
China		CN	NNNNNN		A postal code or yóu biān (邮编) in a subordinate division will have the same first two digits as its governing one (see Political divisions of China. The postal services in Macau or Hong Kong Special Administrative Regions remain separate from Mainland China, with no post code system currently used.
Christmas Island		CX	NNNN		Part of the Australian postal code system.
Cocos (Keeling) Island		CC	NNNN		Part of the Australian postal code system.
Colombia		CO	NNNNNN		First NN = 32 departments
Comoros		KM	no codes		
Congo (Brazzaville)		CG	no codes		
Congo, Democratic Republic		CD	no codes		
Cook Islands		CK	no codes		
Costa Rica	31 March 2007	CR	NNNNN	NNNNN-NNNN	Was NNNN until 2007. First codes the provinces, next two the canton, last two the district.
Côte d'Ivoire (Ivory Coast)		CI	no codes		
Croatia		HR	NNNNN		
Cuba		CU	NNNNN		May only be required for bulk mail. The letters CP are frequently used before the postal code. This is not a country code, but an abbreviation for "codigo postal" or postal code.
Curaçao		CW	no codes		
Cyprus	1 October 1994	CY	NNNN		The postal code system covers the whole island, but is not used on mail to Northern Cyprus. Northern Cyprus uses a 5-digit code commencing 99, introduced in 2013. For mail sent there from abroad, the line "Mersin 10" is written on the line above that containing the postal code, and the country name used is "Turkey".
Czech Republic	31 December 1973	CZ	NNN NN		With Slovak Republic, Poštovní směrovací číslo (PSČ) – postal routing number. The first digit is from the range 1–7.
Denmark	20 September 1967	DK	NNNN		Numbering follows the dispatch of postal trains from Copenhagen. Also used by Greenland, e.g.: DK-3900 Nuuk.
Djibouti		DJ	no codes		
Dominica		DM	no codes		
Dominican Republic		DO	NNNNN		
East Timor		TL	no codes		No postal code system in use since Indonesian withdrawal in 1999.
Ecuador	31 December 2013	EC	NNNNNN		
El Salvador		SV	NNNN		
Egypt		EG	NNNNNNN		
Equatorial Guinea		GQ	no codes		
Eritrea		ER	no codes		
Estonia		EE	NNNNN		
Eswatini		SZ	ANNN		The letter identifies one of the country's four districts, either H, M, S or L. The four district regions are Hhohho region (H), Manzini region (M), Shiselweni region (S), and Lumombo region (L).
Ethiopia		ET	NNNN		The code is only used on a trial basis for Addis Ababa addresses.
Falkland Islands		FK	FIQQ 1ZZ		Single code (AAAA NAA). UK territory, but not UK postcode
Faroe Islands		FO	CC-NNN		3-digit postal code preceded by FO. Self-governing territory within the Kingdom of Denmark, but does not use Danish postal codes, and is addressed internationally as Faroe Islands, not Denmark.
Fiji		FJ	no codes		
Finland	31 December 1971	FI	NNNNN		A lower first digit indicates a place in south (for example 00100 Helsinki), a higher indicates a place further to north (99800 in Ivalo). The last digit is usually 0, except for postal codes for PO Box number ranges, in which case it is 1. Country code for Finland: "FI". In Åland, the postal code is prefixed with "AX", not "FI". Some postal codes for rural settlements may end with 5, and there are some unique postal codes for large companies and institutions, e.g. 00014 HELSINGIN YLIOPISTO (university), 00102 EDUSKUNTA (parliament), 00020 NORDEA (a major Scandinavian bank).
France	3 June 1972	FR	NNNNN		The first two digits give the département number, while in Paris, Lyon and Marseille, the last two digits of the postal code indicate the arrondissement. Both of the 2 Corsican départements use "20" as the first two digits. Also used by French overseas departments and territories. Monaco is also part of the French postal code system, but the country code MC- is used for Monegasque addresses.
French Guiana		GF	973NN		Overseas Department of France. French codes used. Range 97300 – 97390.
French Polynesia		PF	987NN		Overseas Collectivity of France. French codes used. Range 98700–98790.
French Southern and Antarctic Territories		TF	no codes		French codes in the 98400 range have been reserved.
Gabon		GA	no codes		
Gambia		GM	no codes		
Georgia		GE	NNNN		
Germany	25 July 1941 – 1962 resp. 1965	DE	NN		Postleitzahl (PLZ)
Germany	1962 resp. 1965–1993	DE	NNNN		Postleitzahl (PLZ) – Two separate systems in Western Germany (Federal Republic) and East Germany (German Democratic Republic). Between German reunification in 1990 and 1993 the old separate 4-digit postal codes of former West- and East-Germany were distinguished by preceding "W-" ('West') or "O-" ('Ost' for East).
Germany	1 July 1993	DE	NNNNN		Postleitzahl (PLZ) – Totally new system introduced about 4 years after the German reunification.
Ghana	18 October 2017	GH	A?NNN, A?NNNN, A?NNNNN		Ghana uses a digital address system. A digital address is made up of two main components: a postcode (e.g. EN-200) and a unique address (e.g. 1987). The first letter in the postcode represents a region (E for Eastern Region in this case), the second letter/digit (N) represents the district (N for New Juaben). The next batch of numbers (200) represent the area code. The regional, district and area codes come together to form the postcode. The last batch of numbers (1987) represent the unique address of the location. A combination of the postcode and the unique address make up the digital address.
Gibraltar		GI	GX11 1AA		Single code used for all addresses.
Greece	31 December 1983	GR	NNN NN		
Greenland		GL	NNNN		Part of the Danish postal code system.
Grenada		GD	no codes		
Guadeloupe		GP	971NN		Overseas Department of France. French codes used. Range 97100 – 97190, which still includes the distinctive postal codes for Saint Martin and Saint Barthélemy.
Guam	1 July 1963	GU	NNNNN, NNNNN-NNNN		U.S. ZIP codes. Range 96910–96932.
Guatemala		GT	NNNNN		The first two numbers identify the department, the third number the route and the last two the office.
Guernsey	30 June 1993	GG	AAN NAA, AANN NAA		UK-format postcode (first two letters are always GY)
Guinea		GN	NNN		
Guinea Bissau		GW	NNNN		
Guyana		GY	no codes		
Haiti		HT	NNNN		
Heard and McDonald Islands		HM	no codes		
Honduras		HN	AANNNN, NNNNN		NNNNN is still being used
Hong Kong		HK	no codes		The dummy postal code of Hong Kong is 999077. However, if you provide this dummy code where your address label will be electronically created, the system may change the destination country to "Hong Kong S.A.R, CHINA". The addition of "CHINA" can significantly delay delivery. Use an alternate dummy instead (e.g. 00000).
Hungary	31 December 1973	HU	NNNN		The code defines an area, usually one code per settlement except the six largest towns. One code can identify more (usually) small settlements as well.
Iceland	1977	IS	NNN		First digit ordered clockwise around the country from Reykjavík.
India	15 August 1972	IN	NNNNNN, NNN NNN		Postal Index Number (PIN) consists of six digits: first digit for region, second digit for subregion, third digit for revenue/sorting office and last three digits representing the post office of the area.
Indonesia		ID	NNNNN		
Iran		IR	NNNNN-NNNNN		(Persian: کد پستی)
Iraq	31 December 2004	IQ	NNNNN		
Ireland	13 July 2015	IE	ANN (Routing key, which is never used on its own)	[D6W/ANN] [A/N][A/N][A/N][A/N] (Single exception where its D6W ????)	Note: A valid postcode never contains the letters: B, G, I, J, L, M, O, Q, S, U, Z. Ireland's postcode system (called Eircode) refers to individual properties – not to streets/areas. It is presented in the format A12 A1BC The first 3 characters are a routing key referring to a postal district, and the second 4 characters are a unique, pseudorandom identifier for individual properties. The codes are only used in full 7-character format. See: www.eircode.ie for more information. See also Republic of Ireland postal addresses.
Isle of Man	31 December 1993	IM	CCN NAA, CCNN NAA		UK-format postcode. The first two letters are always IM.
Israel	1 February 2013	IL	NNNNNNN		In 2013, after the introduction of the 7 digit codes, 5 digit codes were still being used widely.
Italy	1 July 1967	IT	NNNNN		Codice di avviamento postale (CAP). Also used by San Marino (prefix SM) and Vatican City (prefix VA). First two digits identify province with some exceptions, because there are more than 100 provinces.
Jamaica	12 February 2007	JM	NN		Before suspension: CCAAANN. Jamaica currently has no national postal code system, except for Kingston and Lower St. Andrew, which are divided into postal districts numbered 1-20 Before the 2007 suspension, the first two letters of a national post code were always 'JM' (for Jamaica) while the third was for one of the four zones (A-D) into which the island was divided. The last two letters were for the parish, while the two digits were for the local post office.
Japan	1 July 1968	JP	NNN-NNNN		See also Japanese addressing system.
Jersey	31 December 1994	JE	CCN NAA, CCNN NAA		UK-format postcode. The first two letters are always JE.
Jordan		JO	NNNNN		Deliveries to PO Boxes only.
Kazakhstan		KZ	NNNNNN		
Kenya		KE	NNNNN		Deliveries to PO Boxes only. The postal code refers to the post office at which the receiver's P. O. Box is located.
Kiribati		KI	no codes		
Korea, North		KP	no codes		
Korea, South	1 August 2015	KR	NNNNN		Previously NNN-NNN (1988~2015), NNN or NNN-NN (1970~1988)
Kosovo		XK	NNNNN		A separate postal code for Kosovo was introduced by the UNMIK postal administration in 2004. Serbian postcodes are still widely used in the Serbian enclaves. No country code has been assigned.
Kuwait		KW	NNNNN		The first two digits represent the sector and the last three digits represents the post office.
Kyrgyzstan		KG	NNNNNN		
Laos		LA	NNNNN		
Latvia		LV	CC-NNNN		
Lebanon		LB	NNNN, NNNN NNNN		The first four digits represent the region or postal zone, the last four digits represent the building see also.
Lesotho		LS	NNN		
Liberia		LR	NNNN		Two digit postal zone after city name.
Libya		LY	no codes		
Liechtenstein	26 June 1964	LI	NNNN		With Switzerland, ordered from west to east. Range 9485–9498.
Lithuania		LT	CC-NNNNN		Previously 9999 which was actually the old Soviet 999999 format code with the first 2 digits dropped.
Luxembourg		LU	NNNN		4Digit postal code, 1st digit represent the Region
Macau		MO	no codes		999078 is the dummy code used in China to represent Macau, but it is not used. Use an alternate dummy instead (e.g. 00000).
Madagascar		MG	NNN		
Malawi		MW	NNNNNN		
Malaysia		MY	NNNNN		
Maldives		MV	NNNNN		
Mali		ML	no codes		
Malta		MT	AAA NNNN		Kodiċi Postali
Marshall Islands	1 July 1963	MH	NNNNN, NNNNN-NNNN		U.S. ZIP codes. Range 96960–96970.
Mauritania		MR	no codes		
Mauritius		MU	NNNNN, RNNNN		Rodrigues Island uses RNNNN, for example R5135
Martinique		MQ	972NN		Overseas Department of France. French codes used. Range 97200–97290.
Mayotte		YT	976NN		Overseas Department of France. French codes used. Range 97600–97690.
Mexico		MX	NNNNN		The first two digits identify the state (or a part thereof), except for Nos. 00 to 16, which indicate delegaciones (boroughs) of the Federal District (Mexico City).
Micronesia	1 July 1963	FM	NNNNN, NNNNN-NNNN		U.S. ZIP codes. Range 96941–96944.
Moldova		MD	CCNNNN, CC-NNNN		
Monaco	3 June 1972	MC	980NN		Uses the French Postal System, but with an "MC" Prefix for Monaco. Code range 98000-98099
Mongolia		MN	NNNNN		First digit: region / zone, Second digit: province / district, Last three digits: locality / delivery block
Montenegro		ME	NNNNN		
Montserrat		MS	MSR NNNN		Range 1110–1350
Morocco	1 January 1997	MA	NNNNN		
Mozambique		MZ	NNNN		
Myanmar	12 September 2021	MM	NNNNNNN		The first two digits correspond to States and Regions, the later 2 digits identify the Townships, while the rest 3 digits indicate the Quarter and Village Tracts.
Namibia		NA	NNNNN		Formerly used South African postal code ranges from 9000-9299. Withdrawn from use after independence in 1990. Namibia has introduced a 5-digit postal code in 2018.
Nauru		NR	no codes		
Nepal		NP	NNNNN		
Netherlands	31 December 1977	NL	NNNN	NNNN AA	The combination of the postal code and the house number gives a unique identifier of the address. The four numbers indicate an area, the two letters indicate a group of some 25 habitations, offices, factories, or post office boxes.
New Caledonia		NC	988NN		Overseas Collectivity of France. French codes used. Range 98800–98890.
New Zealand	30 June 2008	NZ	NNNN		Postcodes were originally intended for bulk mailing and were not needed for addressing individual items. However, new post codes for general use were phased in from June 2006 and came into force by July 2008.
Nicaragua		NI	NNNNN		
Niger		NE	NNNN		
Nigeria		NG	NNNNNN		
Niue		NU	no codes		
Norfolk Island		NF	NNNN		Part of the Australian postal code system.
North Macedonia		MK	NNNN		
Northern Mariana Islands	1 July 1963	MP	NNNNN, NNNNN-NNNN		U.S. ZIP codes. Range 96950–96952.
Norway	18 March 1968	NO	NNNN, CC-NNNN		From south to north NO- prefix is used recommended, but not mandatory to be used for international mail to Norway
Oman		OM	NNN		Deliveries to P.O. Boxes only.
Pakistan	1 January 1988	PK	NNNNN		
Palau	1 July 1963	PW	NNNNN, NNNNN-NNNN		U.S. ZIP codes. All locations 96939 or 96940.
Palestine		PS	NNN		not yet implemented in practice. Codes 100-899 are in the Westbank, 900-999 in the Gaza Strip
Panama		PA	NNNN		
Papua New Guinea		PG	NNN		
Paraguay	Prior to June 2018	PY	NNNN		
Paraguay	As of June 2018	PY	NNNNNN		
Peru		PE	NNNNN, CC NNNN		
Philippines		PH	NNNN		
Pitcairn Islands		PN	PCRN 1ZZ		Single code used(AAAA NAA). UK territory, but not UK postcode
Poland	1 January 1973	PL	NN-NNN		(PNA) Pocztowy Numer Adresowy
Portugal	31 December 1976	PT	NNNN		
Portugal	31 December 1994	PT	NNNN-NNN		
Puerto Rico	1 July 1963	PR	NNNNN	NNNNN, NNNNN-NNNN	U.S. ZIP codes. ZIP codes 006XX for NW PR, 007XX for SE PR, in which XX designates the town or post office and 009XX for the San Juan Metropolitan Area, in which XX designates the area or borough of San Juan. The last four digits identify an area within the post office. For example, 00716-2604: 00716-for the east section of the city of Ponce and 2604 for Aceitillo St. in the neighborhood of Los Caobos. US Post office is changing the PR address format to the American one: 1234 No Name Avenue, San Juan, PR 00901.
Qatar		QA	no codes		
Réunion		RE	974NN		Overseas Department of France. French codes used. Range 97400–97490.
Romania	1 May 2003	RO	NNNNNN		Previously 99999 in Bucharest and 9999 in rest of country.
Rwanda		RW	no codes		
Russia	31 December 1971	RU	NNNNNN		Placed on a line of its own.
Saint Barthélemy		BL	97133		Overseas Collectivity of France. French codes used, still within the same range used for Guadeloupe
Saint Helena, Ascension and Tristan da Cunha		SH	AAAA 1ZZ		Part of UK system (AAAA NAA). Saint Helena uses one code STHL 1ZZ, Ascension uses one code ASCN 1ZZ, Tristan da Cunha uses one code TDCU 1ZZ.
Saint Kitts and Nevis		KN	CCNNNN		
Saint Lucia	3 December 2015	LC	CCNN NNN		The first two letters are always LC. There are two spaces between the second and third digits.
Saint Martin		MF	97150		Overseas Collectivity of France. French codes used, still within the same range used for Guadeloupe
Saint Pierre and Miquelon		PM	97500		Overseas Collectivity of France. French codes used.
Saint Vincent and the Grenadines	31 December 2010	VC	CCNNNN		
Samoa		WS	CCNNNN		
San Marino		SM	4789N		With Italy, uses a five-digit numeric CAP of Emilia-Romagna. Range 47890 and 47899
São Tomé and Príncipe		ST	no codes		
Saudi Arabia		SA	NNNNN-NNNN, NNNNN		NNNNN for PO Boxes. NNNNN-NNNN for home delivery. A complete 13-digit code has 5-digit number representing region, sector, city, and zone; 4-digit X between 2000 and 5999; 4-digit Y between 6000 and 9999. Digits of 5-digit code may represent postal region, sector, branch, section, and block respectively.
Senegal		SN	NNNNN		The letters CP or C.P. are often written in front of the postcode. This is not a country code, but simply an abbreviation for "code postal".
Serbia	1 January 2005	RS	NNNNN		Poštanski adresni kod (PAK)
Seychelles		SC	no codes		
Sierra Leone		SL	no codes		
Sint Maarten		SX	no codes		
Singapore	6 March 1950	SG	NN		
Singapore	1 July 1979	SG	NNNN		
Singapore	1 September 1995	SG	NNNNNN		Each building has its own unique postcode.
Slovakia	1 January 1973	SK	NNN NN		with Czech Republic from west to east, Poštové smerovacie číslo (PSČ) – postal routing number. The first digit is from 8, 9, 0.
Slovenia		SI	NNNN, CC-NNNN		before 1996 all postcodes were 6NNNN (part of the former Yugoslav system), in 1996 they removed the "6"
Solomon Islands		SB	no codes		
Somalia		SO	AA NNNNN		Two letter postal codes for each of the nation's 18 administrative regions (e.g. AW for Awdal, BN for Banaadir, BR for Bari and SL for Sool).
South Africa	8 October 1973	ZA	NNNN		Postal codes are allocated to individual Post Office branches, some have two codes to differentiate between P.O. Boxes and street delivery addresses. Included Namibia (ranges 9000–9299) until 1992, no longer used.
South Sudan		SS	no codes		
South Georgia and the South Sandwich Islands		GS	SIQQ 1ZZ		One code for all addresses.
Spain	3 March 1976	ES	NNNNN		First two indicate the province, range 01-52
Sri Lanka		LK	NNNNN		Incorporates Colombo postal districts, e.g.: Colombo 1 is "00100". You can search for specific postal codes here "Department of Posts".
Sudan		SD	NNNNN		
Suriname		SR	no codes		
Sweden	12 May 1968	SE	NNN NN		The lowest number is 100 12 and the highest number is 984 99.
Switzerland	26 June 1964	CH	NNNN		With Liechtenstein, ordered from west to east. In Geneva and other big cities, like Basel, Bern, Zürich, there may be one or two digits after the name of the city when the generic City code (1211) is used instead of the area-specific code (1201, 1202...), e.g.: 1211 Geneva 13. The digit identifies the post office. This addressing is generally used for P.O. box deliveries. Büsingen am Hochrhein (Germany) also has a Swiss postal code.
Svalbard and Jan Mayen		SJ	NNNN		Norway postal codes
Syria		SY	no codes		A 4-digit system has been announced. Status unknown.
Taiwan	20 March 1970	TW	NNN, NNN-NN, NNN-NNN		The first three digits of the postal code are required; the last two or three digits are optional. Codes are known as yóu dì qū hào (郵遞區號), and are also assigned to Senkaku Islands (Diaoyutai), though Japanese-administered, Pratas Island and the Spratly Islands. NNN-NNN 3+3 digit codes were launched on March 3, 2020. See List of postal codes in Taiwan.
Tajikistan		TJ	NNNNNN		Retained system from former Soviet Union. First two numbers: Republic and Province, Second two numbers: District, last two numbers: Post Office.
Tanzania		TZ	NNNNN		
Thailand	25 February 1982	TH	NNNNN		The first two specify the province, numbers as in ISO 3166-2:TH, the third and fourth digits specify a district (amphoe)
Togo		TG	no codes		
Tokelau		TK	no codes		
Tonga		TO	no codes		
Trinidad and Tobago	31 December 2021	TT	NNNNNN		First two digits specify a postal district (one of 72), next two digits a carrier route, last two digits a building or zone along that route
Tunisia		TN	NNNN		
Turkey		TR	NNNNN		First two digits are the city numbers.
Turkmenistan		TM	NNNNNN		Retained system from former Soviet Union.
Turks and Caicos Islands		TC	TKCA 1ZZ		Single code used for all addresses.
Tuvalu		TV	no codes		
Uganda		UG	no codes		
Ukraine		UA	NNNNN		
United Arab Emirates		AE	no codes		UAE does not use a postal code system; instead, they use a post office system to send and receive parcels.
United Kingdom	Phased introduction, from 1966 to 1974. Still in use.	GB	AN ANN AAN AANN ANA AANA	AN NAA ANN NAA AAN NAA AANN NAA ANA NAA AANA NAA	Known as the postcode, and is made up of two parts separated by a space. These are known as the outward postcode and the inward postcode. The outward code indicates the postal area and the district within the area. The outward postcode is always one of the following six formats: AN, ANN, AAN, AANN, ANA*, AANA*. *The formats ANA and AANA are found only in some London postcodes. The inward postcode indicates a small number (+/- 12) delivery points and is always formatted as NAA. A valid inward postcode never contains the letters: C, I, K, M, O or V. The British Forces Post Office, a separate postal system for military forces in the UK and abroad, adopted in 2012 UK-style postcodes in the format "BFN NAA". Some postcodes are for special functions/services such as PO Boxes or Large Users. Postcodes in the Isle of Man, Jersey and Guernsey follow the same format, though managed by respective postal administrations.
United States	1 July 1963	US	NNNNN	NNNNN, NNNNN-NNNN	Known as the ZIP Code with five digits 99999* or the ZIP+4 Code with nine digits 99999-9999* (while the minimum requirement is the first five digits, the U.S. Postal Service encourages everyone to use all nine). Also used by the former US Pacific Territories: Federated States of Micronesia; Palau; and the Marshall Islands, as well as in current US territories American Samoa, Guam, Northern Mariana Islands, Puerto Rico, and the United States Virgin Islands. An individual delivery point may be represented as an 11-digit number, but these are usually represented by Intelligent Mail barcode or formerly POSTNET bar code. The first digit is assigned regionally (for example, ZIP codes beginning with 9 are found in the western coastal states, Alaska, Hawaii, and islands in the Pacific), and ZIP codes with the same first three digits are served by the same USPS sorting facility (which sometimes serve multiple such groupings), so will be geographically clustered (for example, all ZIP codes in 919XX, 920XX, and 921XX are found in San Diego County, California).
United States Minor Outlying Islands		UM	96898		Mostly uninhabited. There is only one postal code in use, 96898 Wake Island.
Uruguay		UY	NNNNN		
U.S. Virgin Islands	1 July 1963	VI	NNNNN, NNNNN-NNNN		U.S. ZIP codes. Range 00801–00851.
Uzbekistan	13 May 2005	UZ	NNNNNN		
Vanuatu		VU	no codes		
Vatican		VA	00120		Single code used for all addresses. Part of the Italian postal code system.
Venezuela		VE	NNNN, NNNN-A		
Vietnam		VN	NNNNN		First two indicate a province.
Wallis and Futuna		WF	986NN		Overseas Collectivity of France. French codes used. Range 98600 – 98690.
Yemen		YE	no codes		System for Sana'a Governorate using geocoding "عنواني" based on the OpenPostcode algorithm is inaugurated in 2014.
Zambia		ZM	NNNNN		
Zimbabwe		ZW	no codes		System is being planned.

== On the use of country codes ==
The use of the country codes in conjunction with postal codes started as a recommendation from CEPT (European Conference of Postal and Telecommunications Administrations) in the 1960s. In the original CEPT recommendation the distinguishing signs of motor vehicles in international traffic ("car codes") were placed before the postal code, and separated from it by a "-" (dash). Codes were only used on international mail and were hardly ever used internally in each country.

Since the late 1980s, however, a number of postal administrations have changed the recommended codes to the two-letter country codes of ISO 3166. This would allow a universal, standardized code set to be used, and bring it in line with country codes used elsewhere in the UPU (Universal Postal Union). Attempts were also made (without success) to make this part of the official address guidelines of the UPU. Recently introduced postal code systems where the UPU has been involved have included the ISO 3166 country code as an integral part of the postal code.

At present there are no universal guidelines as to which code set to use, and recommendations vary from country to country. In some cases, the applied country code will differ according to recommendations of the sender's postal administration. UPU recommends that the country name always be included as the last line of the address.

In the list above, the following principles have been applied:

- Integral country codes have been included in the code format, in bold type and without brackets. These are also used on internal mail in the respective countries.
- The ISO 3166 codes is used alone for countries that have explicitly recommended them.
- Where there is no explicit recommendation for ISO 3166 codes and the codes differ, both "car codes" and ISO 3166 codes are listed, with the "car code" listed first. In some countries, such as Zimbabwe and Zambia, a system is being planned. 1 10 and 11 used to be used as postal codes for Harare, Zimbabwe but a four-digit code system such as 2401 for Zimbabwe, 2402 for Epworth and "Overspill Road," as well as the suburb of "Zinnia Close and Gardenia Close" are given the provisional postal code of 2401. 2501 is the planned postal code for Bulawayo and 2423 for Victoria Falls.

== See also ==
- Universal Postal Union
- International Postcode system using Cubic Meters (CubicPostcode.com)
- International Postcodes database (mapanet.eu)
