= Telecommunications in Iraq =

Telecommunications in Iraq include radio, television, fixed and mobile telephones, and the Internet as well as the postal system.

== Radio and television ==
The number of private radio and TV stations has increased rapidly since 2003. Iraqis get much of their news from TV. Radio listening has declined in tandem with the rise of TV. For private media, advertising revenues seldom produce a reliable income.

- Radio stations:
  - government-owned radio stations are operated by the publicly funded Iraqi Public Broadcasting Service; private broadcast media are mostly linked to political, ethnic, or religious groups; transmissions of multiple international radio broadcasters are available (2007);
  - ~80 stations (2004).
- Television stations:
  - government-owned TV stations are operated by the publicly funded Iraqi Public Broadcasting Service; private broadcast media are mostly linked to political, ethnic, or religious groups; satellite TV is available to an estimated 70% of viewers and many of the broadcasters are based abroad (2007);
  - ~21 stations (2004).
- Radios: ~4.6 million (1997).
- Television sets: ~1.8 million television sets (1997). It has been reported that 88% of households in Iraq have television (2004).

During the reign of Saddam Hussein, broadcasting was largely the domain of the Iraqi Broadcasting and Television Establishment (IBTE). The IBTE, in turn, was dominated by the Ministry of Information. The IBTE often broadcast programming favorable toward Saddam Hussein, including music videos praising him and poetry readings when the station was down. Most IBTE transmitters were in the Baghdad area with a few regional stations. The IBTE aired former CBS reporter Dan Rather's interview with Saddam Hussein, as well as the news from Baghdad Bob during the run up to the 2003 invasion of Iraq. After the overthrow of Saddam Hussein, the IBTE was dissolved.

The current regulator is the Iraqi Communications and Media Commission, and the public broadcaster is the Iraqi Media Network, successor to the Coalition Provisional Authority's and several other radio and television stations. The Iraqi Media Network currently operates the Radio of the Republic of Iraq and the government supported al-Iraqiya TV station. Many private TV stations are also available, such as the popular Al Sharqiya. Up to 97% of homes have a satellite dish and there are more than 30 Iraq-facing satellite networks. Iraqi radio stations showcase the diversity of popular opinion, from hard-line Islamic fundamentalism to Radio Sawa, politically oriented stations, and stations featuring content appealing to Kurdish listeners. In the northern autonomous Kurdish enclaves, rival political factions operate their own media.

The BBC World Service broadcasts in Iraq, as does the American Forces Network (AFN) and British Forces Broadcasting Service (BFBS). Other foreign radio stations operating within Iraq include the UAE's Middle East Broadcasting Centre (MBC), Paris-based Monte Carlo Doualiya, Moyen-Orient, and Radio France International (RFI).

== Telephones ==
- Calling code: +964
- International call prefix: 00
- Main lines:
  - 1.9 million main lines in use, 62nd in the world (2012);
  - 833,000 lines in use (2005).
- Mobile cellular:
  - 38.22 million (2019)
  - 26.8 million lines, 40th in the world (2012);
  - 9.0 million lines (2005).
- Telephone system: Iraq War of 2003 severely disrupted telecommunications throughout Iraq including international connections; repairs to switches and lines destroyed during 2003 continue; widespread government efforts to rebuild domestic and international communications through fiber optic links are in progress; the mobile cellular market has expanded rapidly to some 27 million subscribers at the end of 2012; since 2007 three GSM operators since have expanded beyond their regional roots and offer near country-wide access to second-generation services; third-generation mobile services are not available nationwide; wireless local loop is available in some metropolitan areas and additional licenses have been issued with the hope of overcoming the lack of fixed-line infrastructure; local microwave radio relay connects border regions to Jordan, Kuwait, Syria, and Turkey; international terrestrial fiber-optic connections have been established with Saudi Arabia, Turkey, Kuwait, Jordan, and Iran (2011).
- Communications cables: links to the Fiber-Optic Link Around the Globe (FLAG) / FALCON, and the Gulf Bridge International (GBI), and TGN-Gulf international submarine fiber-optic cables have been established (2011).
- Satellite earth stations: 2 Intelsat (Atlantic Ocean) and 1 Indian Ocean, 1 Intersputnik (Atlantic Ocean region), and 1 Arabsat (inoperative) (2011).

The 2003 Iraq War severely disrupted telecommunications throughout Iraq, including international connections. The Iraq Reconstruction Management Office (IRMO) under the U.S. State Department assisted the Iraqi Ministry of Communications by advising on the repair of switching capability and helping to devise the regulatory framework and licensing regimes for construction of mobile and satellite communications facilities. Many people and companies were involved in the reconstruction including private and public telecommunications companies from the United States, China, Turkey, and the Middle East. Special recognition must be given to the government of Japan and the World Bank Group for funding the first national microwave networks. Most credit goes to the staff of the Ministry of Communications and their operating personnel, and the numerous large and small service providers, who persevere under difficult working conditions. USAID funded several IT training programs with excellent international specialists as trainers and teachers.

Today the system has undergone a remarkable transformation with high rates of annual investment and a functioning regulatory system, that is not quite independent of the political process, but still provides the framework for a competitive telecommunications regime. In 2013-2014 the system is under stress from renewed fighting between different political factions in Iraq.

== Internet ==
- Top-level domain: .iq
- Internet users:
  - 43 million users (2024)
  - 2.2 million users, 87th in the world; 7.1% of the population, 179th in the world (2012).
  - 325,900 users, 126th in the world (2009).
- Fixed broadband: Unknown (2012).
- Wireless broadband: Unknown (2012).
- Internet hosts: 26 hosts, 218th in the world (2012).
- IPv4: 243,712 addresses allocated, 108th in the world, less than 0.05% of the world total, 7.8 addresses per 1000 people (2012).

Under the government of Saddam Hussein, Internet access was tightly controlled. Internet access was banned in 1997–1998, then permitted starting in 1999, but with limited access available. In 2002 it was estimated that only 25,000 Iraqis used the Internet. In 2002, some home access was allowed, and Internet cafés opened in Baghdad, although many websites were blocked. With Hussein's ouster, Internet usage became commonplace.

=== Internet service providers ===
Uruklink, also called the State Company for Internet Services (SCIS), controlled by the Iraqi government, was initially the sole Internet service provider in Iraq. Uruklink now faces competition from other ISPs, including broadband satellite Internet access services from both Middle East and European VSAT hubs. The primary military telecom service provider in Iraq is Ts 2. Since 2006 several more companies have emerged to provide options to individual Iraqis that make Internet access more affordable, albeit with less bandwidth. One such business is Advanced Technology Systems-Iraq (ATS-Iraq).

=== Internet censorship and surveillance ===
==== Status in 2009 ====
In August 2009 the OpenNet Initiative found no evidence of Internet filtering in Iraq in all four of the areas for which they test (political, social, conflict/security, and Internet tools).

==== Status in 2012 ====
In 2012, there were no overt government restrictions on access to the Internet or official acknowledgement that the government monitors e-mail or Internet chat rooms without judicial oversight. NGOs reported that the government could and was widely believed to monitor e‑mail, chat rooms, and social media sites through local Internet service providers.

The constitution broadly provided for the right of free expression, provided it does not violate public order and morality or express support for the banned Baath Party or for altering the country's borders by violent means. In practice the main limitation on individual and media exercise of these rights was self-censorship due to real fear of reprisals by the government, political parties, ethnic and sectarian forces, terrorist and extremist groups, or criminal gangs. Libel and defamation are offenses under the penal law and the 1968 Publications Law with penalties of up to seven years' imprisonment for publicly insulting the government.

After the release and media amplification of the controversial "Innocence of Muslims" Internet video in September 2012, Christian groups reported an increase in death threats. One militant group called the Brigade of the Straight Path issued an ultimatum to Christians in Mosul to leave or be killed. The government provided additional security in Christian neighborhoods following the threat. There were no deaths or attacks related to the threat, and the government reduced security to normal levels by the end of 2012.

The constitution mandated that authorities may not enter or search homes except with a judicial order. The constitution also prohibited arbitrary interference with privacy. In practice security forces often entered homes without search warrants and took other measures interfering with privacy, family, and correspondence.

In 2011 when a documentary filmmaker and author of a prominent blog organized the video coverage of peaceful protests over the Internet via a short, nonsubscription messaging service, he was beaten on 22 April and again on 22 July, allegedly by individuals in civilian clothing linked to the security forces and by army officers as he attempted to videotape demonstrations in Tahrir Square for his blog. He went into hiding, and a few days after the second attack police searched his house. He later resumed blogging.

==== Status in 2025 ====
As of 2025, Internet freedom is restricted in Iraq. Power outages and the cost of Internet service limit access. The government blocks some websites due to "immoral" content and shuts off the Internet at certain times during academic exam periods.

== Postal system ==
As part of the post-invasion social and economic infrastructure reconstruction program, a contract worth $55 million was awarded to study the postal system in Iraq. The Postal system of Iraq was organized following that study.

== See also ==
- Iraqi Telecommunications and Post Company
- Iraqi Post
- Iraq Telecom Facts
