= Postal codes in Hong Kong =

With the exception of mail from mainland China, postal codes are not used in Hong Kong as the Hongkong Post deems it unnecessary to adopt such a system. Hongkong Post advises people to leave the postcode field blank, or fill in with "000", "0000", "000000" or "HKG" wherever required. The People's Republic of China's national postal service, China Post, allocated the postal code 999077 to Hong Kong, although this is only sporadically used when sending mail from mainland China. As China Post does not serve Hong Kong, this code is generally not used in any other scenarios and remains little-known.

== Background ==
Hong Kong has been a special administrative region of the People's Republic of China (PRC) since 1997. Between 1841 and 1997, Hong Kong was a Crown Colony of the United Kingdom, and the colonial government-established postal service, the Hongkong Post, was retained after the 1997 handover. As such, the postal service remains separate from the postal service in the rest of the PRC under the one country, two systems principle.

Given Hong Kong's small size, postal codes have never been introduced as it would bring little benefit to the already-efficient postal service. Hongkong Post is of the view that in the absence of postcode in Hong Kong, over 99% of the local mail is delivered within two working days and 99% of inward airmail items is delivered within two working days after arrival in Hong Kong; thus, such an introduction would not greatly enhance the efficiency of mail delivery in Hong Kong.

The China Post-designated postal code, 999077, is one of the 9-series codes that China Post uses for international and interregional mail sent from mainland China. As China Post do not provide service in Hong Kong, this system is not known to most of the population.

== Addressing postal items ==
Hongkong Post recommends to address letters using recipient name, flat number, building name, house number, street and village or district.

== See also ==
- List of postal codes in China
