= Postal codes in Slovakia =

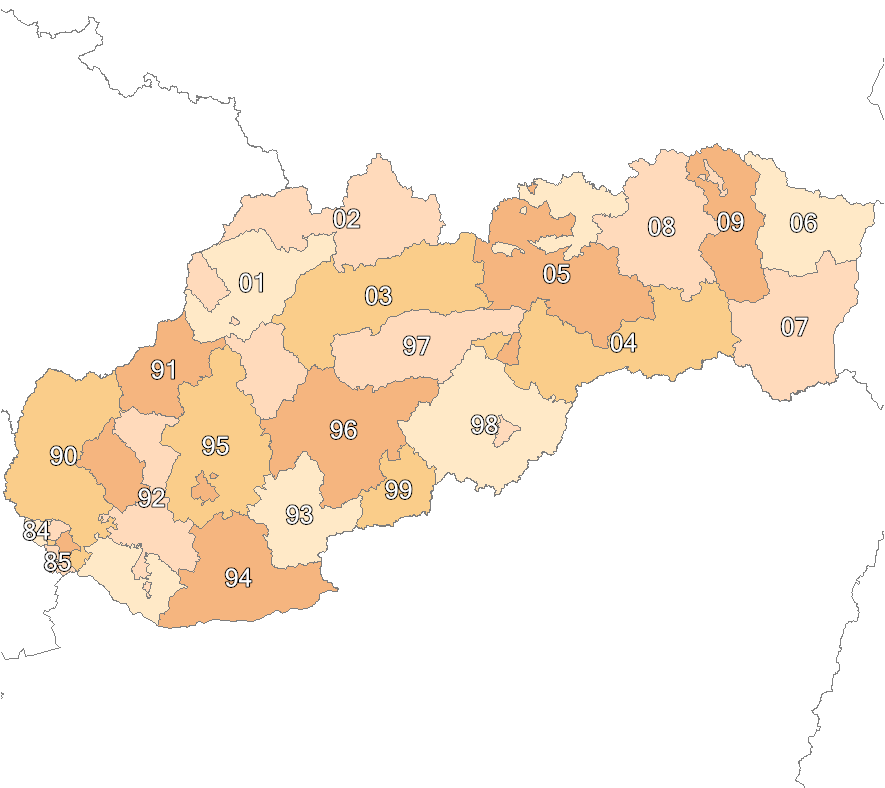
2-digit postcode areas Slovakia (defined through the first two postcode digits)

Postal codes in Slovakia use the old system of Czechoslovakia.

The system of PSČ numbers (PSČ, stands for Slovak: Poštové smerovacie číslo - postal routing number) was introduced in former Czechoslovakia in 1973 and has remained unchanged. The postal code consists of five digits, usually written with a space in the form XXX XX. The first digit indicates a region:

8 - the capital of Slovakia, Bratislava. The second digit represents one of the five districts of Bratislava. The codes 860 01-899 99 are not assigned to any region and serve for internal purposes of the postal system.
9 - southern and western Slovakia: 911 01 Trenčín, 917 01 Trnava, 949 01 Nitra, 960 01 Zvolen, 974 01 Banská Bystrica, 984 01 Lučenec
0 - northern and eastern Slovakia: 010 01 Žilina, 036 01 Martin, 040 01 - 044 99 Košice, 058 01 Poprad, 071 01 Michalovce, 080 01 Prešov).

Regions 1 to 7 were reserved for the Czech Republic, and are located there. The postal codes of Slovakia and the Czech Republic do not overlap.
When writing the address, the postal code is put in front of the town name; when typed or printed, 1 space separates the leading 3 digits from the trailing 2 digits, and 2 spaces separate the postal code from the town name, e.g.:

 Kúpeľná 1/A
 811 02  Bratislava 1

On envelopes and postcards there are usually five rectangular boxes below the address field for the postal code digits.

On postal items being sent from abroad it is recommended to prepend the postal code with the ISO 3166-1 two-letter code of the country and a dash:

 Kúpeľná 1/A
 SK-811 02  Bratislava 1
 Slovakia

== See also ==
- List of postal codes in Slovakia
