= Postal codes in Greenland =

Postal codes in Greenland consist of the two letter ISO 3166 code "GL", followed by four digits, the first two of which are "39".

Nuuk Sømandshjem
Postbox 1021
GL-3900 Nuuk
GREENLAND

They were first introduced in 1967 as part of the Danish postcode system, which also originally included the Faroe Islands.

Previously, the capital of Greenland, Nuuk, was known by the Danish language name Godthåb, and the "DK" prefix for Denmark was used with the postcode in addresses.

Municipality of Godthåb
PO Box 1005
DK-3900 Godthåb
GREENLAND

In addition, "DK-3900 Nuuk" is also used.
