= Postal codes in Panama =

There are no zip codes in Panama. Some electronic forms have difficulties with this. They will not let you submit your address without a zip code. In that case, put 5 zeros for the zip code. There are however private postal codes which identify specific PO Boxes these consists of four numeric digits. The first two digits represent the province or provincial-level indigenous region. For the provinces, these are the same digits as used in its ISO 3166-2 code.

Province	Post Code
Bocas del Toro	0101
Chiriquí	0401
Coclé	0201
Colón	0301
Darién	0501
Herrera	0601
Los Santos	0701
Panamá	0801
Panamá Oeste	1001
Veraguas	0901

For a complete listing of the country's postal codes, broken down by province and district, visit the Panama Postal Codes page.
