= Postal codes in Nicaragua =

Postal codes in Nicaragua are five digit numeric. There are a total 929 postal codes assigned to 153 municipalities and 776 neighbourhoods in Managua.
