= Postal codes in Taiwan =

Postal codes in Taiwan (Chinese: 郵遞區號; pinyin: Yóudì qūhào; Pe̍h-ōe-jī: Iû-tē khu-hō) is a system of three plus three (3+3) numeral digits used by Chunghwa Post, the government-owned postal service in Taiwan.

The first three digits of postal codes mainly correspond to the 368 townships, county-administered cities, and districts in Taiwan. However, the districts under the cities of Chiayi and Hsinchu share a single code. In addition, the published table includes 3 island entries in addition to administrative divisions: Tungsha (Pratas Island), Nansha (Spratly Islands), and Tiaoyutai (Senkaku Islands). These brings the total three digit postal codes in use to 368.

Omitting the supplementary three digits is ordinarily acceptable, especially for general public, while using a six-digit code is expected for corporate customers who send large-volume mails, which will speed the delivery of the mail.

== History ==
In the 1960s, unified postal code systems have been developed in different countries to improve the process of automatic mail sorting machines. These include ZIP Codes of United States Postal Service (5 numeral digits) and Postal codes in Japan (3+2 numeral digits).

On March 20, 1970 the first table of three (3) numeral digit Taiwanese postal codes are announced by the Directorate General of Posts, Ministry of Transportation and Communications (then Chunghwa Post).

On July, 1 1985, the Directorate General of Posts extends the postal code plan to three plus two (3+2) numeral digits. This makes the format of Taiwanese postal codes coincide with that of United States ZIP Code and Japanese postal codes at that time. The new format makes Taiwanese mails recognizable by the automatic mail sorting machines imported from Japan and United States.

On March 3, 2020, the postal codes are further extends to three plus three (3+3) numeral digits, in order to support more fine grained delivery section codes. For example, a bank with a high volume of mail or a community with a mailroom could have a unique code.

The initial three digit division codes remain unchanged, only the supplemental two digits were updated to three digits. The previous three plus two digit system had been in service for 35 years, since February 1, 1991.

As of November 2020, three + two digit postal codes are still in common use and accepted by the post office. A significant proportion of forms and systems provide space for only three + two digit postal codes.

There are apps for Android and iOS/iPadOS to look up the 3+3 postal codes.

== Postal codes by administrative divisions ==
Greater postal zones of Taiwan

The first digit is for a greater postal zone, each three digit postal code corresponds to a township, county-administered city, or district. In the hierarchy of administrative divisions of Taiwan, districts are under a special municipality or a provincial city; while townships and county-administered cities are under a county.

Despite the wide range of codes, there are only 368 postal codes are actively in use, some codes are omitted due to changes on administrative divisions.

3-digit code range		Special municipality county, and city	3-digit code range		Special municipality county, and city
1	00–16	Taipei	6	00	Chiayi City
2	00–06	Keelung	6	02–25	Chiayi County
2	07–08	New Taipei	6	30–55	Yunlin
2	09–12	Lienchiang (Matsu)	7	00–45	Tainan
2	20–53	New Taipei	8	00–52	Kaohsiung
2	60–72	Yilan	8	80–85	Penghu
3	00	Hsinchu City	8	90–96	Kinmen
3	02–15	Hsinchu County	9	00–47	Pingtung
3	20–38	Taoyuan	9	50–66	Taitung
3	50–69	Miaoli	9	70–83	Hualien
4	00–39	Taichung	—N/a		
5	00–30	Changhua	—N/a		
5	40–58	Nantou	—N/a		

The 3 districts of Hsinchu City shares a single code 300. The 2 districts of Chiayi City shares a single code 600.

== Postal codes of disputed islands ==
In addition to the administrative division postal codes, 3 additional postal codes are included in the table published by Chunghwa Post. They are: Tiaoyutai islands (290), Tungsha islands (817), Nansha islands (819). These entries were created to enhance the territorial claims of the government of the Republic of China.

In reality, Chunghwa Post delivers mails to the established Taiwanese Coast Guard stations on Pratas Island (Tungsha) (817) and Taiping Island, the largest island of the Spratly Islands (819). There is no mail delivery to the Senkaku Islands (Tiaoyutai) (290), as they are controlled by Japan and have been uninhabited for many decades.

Postal code entry		Mail delivery	International name	Status
290	Tiaoyutai Islands	No	Senkaku Islands	Controlled by Japan, see Senkaku Islands dispute; Uninhabited island
817	Tungsha Islands	Yes	Pratas Island	Controlled by Taiwan; Only stationed by Taiwanese Coast Guard personnel
819	Nansha Islands	Partial (Taiping Island only)	Spratly Islands	Mixed controls, see Spratly Islands dispute; Only stationed by Taiwanese Coast Guard personnel

== See also ==
- List of postal codes
- Postal codes in Japan
- ZIP Code
