= Postal codes in Luxembourg =

Map of postal codes in Luxembourg.

Postal codes in Luxembourg are entirely numeric and consist of four digits. The first digit indicates the region, however this subdivision of the territory does not correspond exactly to the usual administrative subdivision (districts and cantons).

- Postal codes starting with a 1 or a 2 are located in the capital city of Luxembourg.
- Postal codes starting with a 3 are located South of the capital city.
- Postal codes starting with a 4 are located in the city of Esch-sur-Alzette.
- Postal codes starting with a 5 are located in the South-East of the country.
- Postal codes starting with a 6 are located in the North-East of the country.
- Postal codes starting with a 7 are located North of the capital city.
- Postal codes starting with an 8 are located in the West of the country.
- Postal codes starting with a 9 are located in the North of the country.
- Postal codes starting with a 0 are for PackUp locations, with the second digit corresponding to the area's standard postal code (e.g. PackUp post code 0161 is in the City of Luxembourg).

In larger municipalities every street has its own postal code, smaller municipalities often have only one code for the whole town. If there are several postal codes within one municipality, they are ordered alphabetically, except that the first numbers are reserved for important clients (administrations and companies).
