= Postal codes in Algeria =

In Algeria, the postal codes of province capitals are composed of the province code as in ISO 3166-2:DZ and three zeros, for example: 16000 for Algiers, while the postal codes of other cities, towns, and villages in the province are the provincial code followed by three numerals.
