= Postal codes in Tunisia =

Postal codes in Tunisia are four digit numbers. The first two digits of the postal code denote the Governorates of Tunisia.
Listed below are the first 2 digits of codes assigned to each governorate.

== Governorates ==
A map showing the Governorates of Tunisia

Governorate	Code
Ariana	20xx
Béja	90xx
Ben Arous	20xx and 11xx
Bizerte	70xx
Gabès	60xx
Gafsa	21xx
Jendouba	81xx
Kairouan	31xx
Kasserine	12xx
Kebili	42xx
Kef	71xx
Mahdia	51xx
Manouba	20xx and 11xx
Medenine	41xx
Monastir	50xx
Nabeul	80xx
Sfax	30xx
Sidi Bouzid	91xx
Siliana	61xx
Sousse	40xx
Tataouine	32xx
Tozeur	22xx
Tunis	20xx and 10xx
Zaghouan	11xx

== All postal codes in Json format ==
{
	"ARIANA":["2080","2027","2037","2091","2058","2041","2094","2061","2022","2081","2056","2083","2088","2020","2032","2057","2035","2073","2036"],
	"BEJA":["9030","9084","9000","9031","9023","9052","9021","9029","9080","9083","9070","9072","9071","9013","9075","9015","9034","9044","9024","9012","9010","9011","9040","9032","9046","9062","9060","9014","9061","9042","9022"],
	"BEN_AROUS":["2013","2043","2097","2059","2074","2034","2065","1135","2082","2093","2050","2099","2096","2063","2014","2033","2024","1145","2090","2054","2064","2044","2040","1125","2098","2018","2055","2084","1164"],
	"BIZERTE":["7000","7061","7053","7001","7003","7002","7029","7016","7081","7093","7012","7020","7071","7094","7064","7011","7041","7027","7036","7033","7014","7024","7040","7022","7030","7050","7042","7072","7026","7035","7080","7075","7034","7070","7015","7098","7045","7025","7010","7097","7031","7032","7013","7043","7060","7023","7063","7021"],
    "EL_KEF":["7170","7114","7160","7115","7113","7123","7180","7135","7136","7130","7117","7110","7111","7131","7141","7150","7153","7132","7151","7133","7125","7120","7112","7116","7100","7122","7194","7134"],
    "GABES":["6092","6062","6027","6095","6020","6060","6013","6010","6052","6042","6089","6061","6000","6099","6001","6071","6040","6041","6031","6051","6032","6012","6072","6014","6033","6011","6022","6021","6035","6080","6016","6015","6081","6036","6055","6023","6056","6046","6045","6026","6070","6054","6034","6024","6025","6044","6043","6030"],
    "GAFSA":["2135","2115","2139","2196","2141","2111","2169","2151","2121","2173","2170","2100","2124","2143","2142","2133","2123","2112","2130","2132","2134","2113","2120","2140","2122","2110","2161","2114","2131","2180","2125","2183","2181","2145","2193","2195","2190","2116","2192"],
    "JENDOUBA":["8136","8130","8134","8121","8135","8126","8116","8143","8170","8124","8173","8142","8140","8114","8141","8145","8160","8162","8161","8117","8111","8189","8100","8132","8122","8196","8153","8195","8131","8115","8185","8194","8193","8110","8112","8127","8192","8128","8181"],
    "KAIRAOUEN":["3152","3181","3180","3126","3183","3133","3112","3121","3161","3116","3145","3150","3153","3154","3160","3130","3134","3113","3120","3124","3143","3192","3100","3199","3198","3131","3191","3151","3140","3129","3182","3142","3193","3111","3170","3114","3171","3173","3115","3135","3110","3132","3194","3125","3196","3195"],
    "KASSERINE":["1281","1280","1279","1216","1234","1213","1223","1240","1243","1242","1215","1245","1241","1247","1285","1221","1225","1253","1237","1200","1230","1233","1226","1214","1294","1293","1250","1263","1251","1252","1256","1255","1254","1211","1210","1224","1231","1261","1235","1271","1270","1273","1220","1232","1212","1222"],
    "KEBILI":["4222","4234","4216","4215","4260","4261","4264","4210","4293","4280","4274","4233","4294","4273","4237","4232","4235","4231","4236","4283","4223","4230","4212","4213","4253","4224","4200","4243","4242","4214","4263","4211"],
	"MAHDIA":["5112","5125","5110","5170","5133","5130","5135","5160","5124","5153","5134","5140","5145","5144","5155","5113","5154","5122","5180","5126","5115","5136","5189","5116","5146","5141","5100","5111","5199","5121","5131","5127","5129","5150","5120","5123","5190","5132","5151","5193","5192","5114","5117"],
	"MANNOUBA":["1113","1142","1134","1124","2012","2075","2086","2011","2010","2028","1110","1153","1116","2071","2021","2031","1144","1130","1143","1133","1114"],
	"MEDENINE":["4160","4163","4192","4193","4183","4153","4151","4110","4159","4132","4122","4112","4180","4185","4146","4156","4195","4120","4115","4186","4123","4182","4136","4179","4190","4100","4121","4130","4142","4111","4116","4176","4126","4145","4199","4175","4165","4113","4133","4141","4143","4131","4127","4191","4181","4117","4135","4125","4155","4150","4166","4170","4134","4173","4154","4124","4144","4114","4164","4194","4174","4172","4137"],
    "MONASTIR":["5090","5091","5092","5021","5022","5032","5076","5036","5062","5014","5026","5043","5020","5028","5017","5027","5030","5013","5070","5016","5025","5063","5031","5023","5053","5071","5054","5034","5050","5024","5051","5044","5060","5089","5011","5000","5065","5079","5052","5010","5041","5012","5061","5042","5015","5099","5035","5080","5066","5040","5033","5046","5045"],
    "NABEUL":["8021","8014","8099","8060","8023","8013","8066","8022","8061","8040","8011","8075","8026","8046","8074","8036","8045","8016","8044","8089","8071","8093","8030","8012","8092","8082","8052","8084","8025","8096","8056","8042","8050","8032","8090","8035","8055","8069","8094","8065","8070","8043","8024","8033","8053","8076","8010","8091","8080","8054","8034","8015","8083","8064","8000","8062","8063","8051","8020","8041","8073","8031"],
    "SFAX":["3030","3037","3057","3075","3040","3082","3085","3097","3026","3080","3086","3077","3016","3056","3087","3036","3095","3046","3066","3024","3034","3010","3043","3033","3053","3060","3044","3070","3015","3035","3055","3045","3025","3020","3092","3014","3041","3031","3021","3091","3000","3047","3039","3099","3089","3079","3032","3051","3027","3069","3049","3065","3048","3052","3064","3072","3071","3023","3013","3083","3084","3042","3074","3076","3078","3059","3022","3093","3012","3062","3050","3073","3094","3011","3054","3081","3061","3063","3067"],
    "SIDI_BOUZID":["9113","9126","9159","9123","9122","9110","9143","9140","9158","9149","9144","9180","9116","9183","9150","9154","9151","9170","9115","9173","9174","9172","9120","9169","9112","9100","9133","9171","9141","9131","9111","9132","9125","9127","9121","9142","9114","9139","9124"],
	"SILIANA":["6180","6113","6134","6112","6135","6116","6152","6150","6172","6111","6121","6110","6126","6131","6141","6114","6133","6125","6120","6122","6132","6140","6151","6142","6100","6130","6123","6196","6124","6143","6170","6115","6173"],
	"SOUSSE":["4022","4042","4017","4089","4011","4012","4060","4063","4062","4021","4020","4016","4015","4014","4013","4033","4070","4099","4024","4040","4045","4043","4092","4010","4082","4026","4025","4061","4051","4054","4071","4000","4059","4041","4031","4023","4081","4035","4095","4034","4030","4032"],
	"TATAOUINE":["3212","3253","3220","3241","3224","3271","3261","3251","3235","3262","3223","3200","3225","3213","3244","3240","3245","3286","3217","3272","3233","3282","3243","3263","3214","3215","3284","3222","3274","3232","3242","3221","3252","3264","3293","3211"],
	"TOZEUR":["2263","2214","2260","2262","2224","2261","2223","2245","2240","2212","2253","2211","2233","2243","2239","2210","2200","2241","2213"],
	"TUNIS":["1000","1069","1002","1073","1001","1054","2016","2085","2025","2026","1003","2035","2051","2052","2087","1046","2023","2053","1074","2066","1082","2092","1004","1013","1029","1005","2000","1006","1075","1064","2062","1091","1068","2042","1009","2060","2089","1067","1053","2078","2046","2076","2045","1057","1019","1008","1059","2009","2017","2015","1089","1027","1095","2072","1007"],
    "ZAGHOUAN":["1123","1141","1193","1111","1131","1162","1140","1194","1146","1154","1160","1163","1122","1152","1112","1115","1100","1155","1132","1121"]
}
