= Postal codes in China =

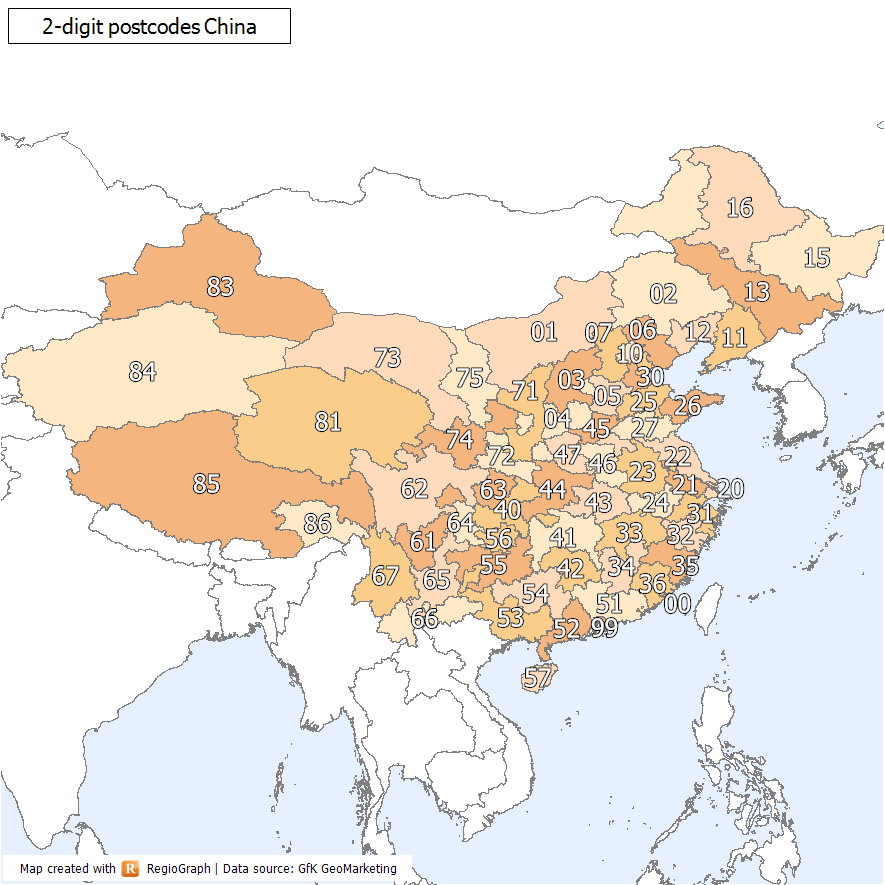
2-digit postcode areas China (defined through the first two postcode digits)

Postal codes in the People's Republic of China (邮政编码) are postal codes used by China Post for the delivery of letters and goods within mainland China.

China Post uses a six-digit all-numerical system with four tiers: the first tier, composed of the first two digits, show the province, province-equivalent municipality, or autonomous region; the second tier, composed of the third digit, shows the postal zone within the province, municipality or autonomous region; the fourth digit serves as the third tier, which shows the postal office within prefectures or prefecture-level cities; the last two digits are the fourth tier, which indicates the specific mailing area for delivery.

The range 000000–009999 was originally marked for Taiwan (The Republic of China) but is not used because it is not under the control of the People's Republic of China. Mail to ROC is treated as international mail, and uses postal codes set forth by Chunghwa Post.

Codes starting from 999 are the internal codes used by China Post for handling international (including the SARs and Taiwan) mails, and are not used by the general public.
