= Postal codes in Bermuda =

Postcodes in the British Overseas Territory of Bermuda use two different formats, depending on whether they are for street addresses or PO Boxes.

Postcodes for street addresses consist of two letters and two digits, as follows:

Mr. & Mrs Householder
Upper Apt # 1
9 Leafy Lane
SMITH'S FL 07
BERMUDA

Postcodes for PO Box addresses, however, consist of four letters. In the capital, Hamilton, a PO Box address would be:

Mr. Boxholder
PO Box HM 2469
HAMILTON HM GX
BERMUDA

In Hamilton, each PO Box number range has a different postcode, while postcodes for PO Box addresses in the rest of Bermuda will always end in BX, for example:

PO Box DV 583
Devonshire DV BX
BERMUDA
