= Postal codes in Oceania =

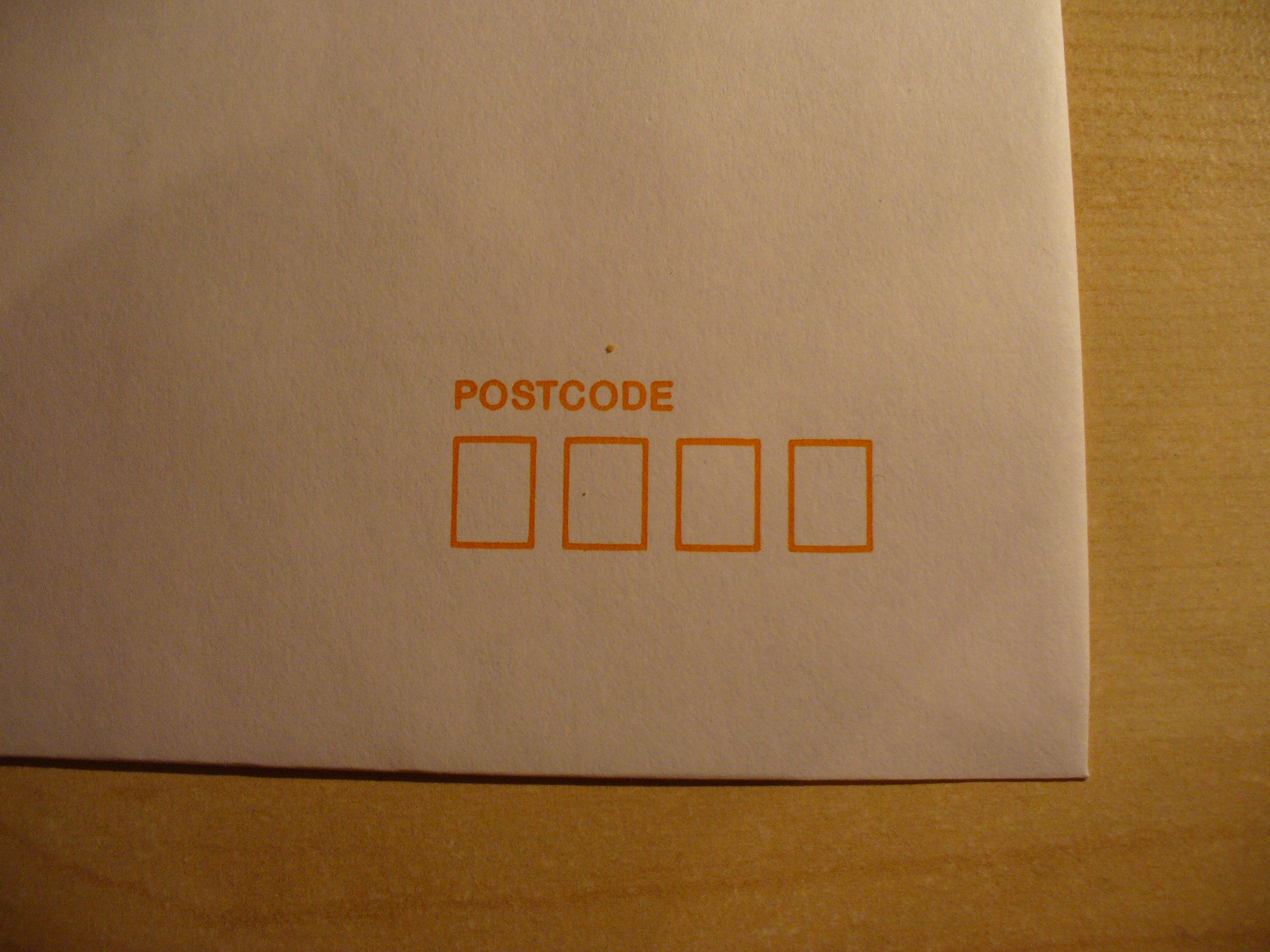
An Australian envelope bearing four square boxes, one for each of the digits contained in standard Australian postcodes.

Postcodes used in Oceania vary between the various sovereign nations, territories, and associated states in the region. Many of the smaller island regions in Oceania use postal code systems that are integrated into the postal systems of larger countries they are territories or associates of.

== American states, territories, and states of association ==
In addition to the U.S. State of Hawai'i, there are two territories, one commonwealth, and three freely associated states within Oceania that are administered by the United States Postal Service (U.S.P.S.). All of these places use zip codes that start with the prefixes 967, 968, or 969. Standard USPS domestic rates apply to mail between the United States and these places.

- Within the State of Hawai'i (postal abbreviation HI), zip code prefix 968 is generally reserved for Urban Honolulu, with all other areas prefixed 967 (shared with American Samoa).
- Within the U.S. Territories, American Samoa (postal abbreviation AS) uses zip code 96799, and Guam (postal abbreviation GU) uses zip codes in the range 96910–96932.
- Each major island of the Commonwealth of the Northern Mariana Islands (postal abbreviation MP) has its own zip code in the 96950-96952 range.
- The nominally independent countries governed by the Compact of Free Association with the United States are also fully integrated into the U.S. Postal Service: The Federated States of Micronesia (postal abbreviation FM), the Marshall Islands (postal abbreviation MH), and Palau (postal abbreviation PW). Palau's abbreviation is derived from the word "Pelew", an old spelling for the archipelago. Two ZIP codes are used within Palau, with 96939 applying to the entire city of Ngerulmud, and 96940 referring to all other parts of Palau.

== Australia ==
Postcodes were introduced in Australia in 1967 by the Postmaster-General's Department and are now managed by Australia Post, and are published in booklets available from post offices or online from the Australia Post website. Postcodes in Australia have four digits and are placed at the end of the Australian address.

== French overseas territories ==
There are three French Overseas Départements or Territories in Oceania that are integrated into the postal code system of France: French Polynesia, New Caledonia, and Wallis and Futuna. Like Overseas Départements and Territories around the world, the French postal service uses 3-digit codes to refer to these places: 987 for French Polynesia, 988 for New Caledonia, and 986 for Wallis and Futuna.

== Pitcairn Islands ==
The Pitcairn Islands is integrated into the postal code system of the United Kingdom.
