= Postal codes in Iraq =

In 2004 a new postal code system was introduced in Iraq.

Iraqi Post has developed a comprehensive Postal Code numbering system that will ensure more efficient mail sorting and accuracy of delivery of your correspondence. The new postal system was rededicated in 2004. The system is numeric and utilizes five digits that correspond to the Region, governorate as well as the post office within that governorate.

Mail Address Format: Examples:

Recipients Name

Company Name (if any)

PO Box # or Street Address

City*, Province

Postal Code

== Codes by governorates ==
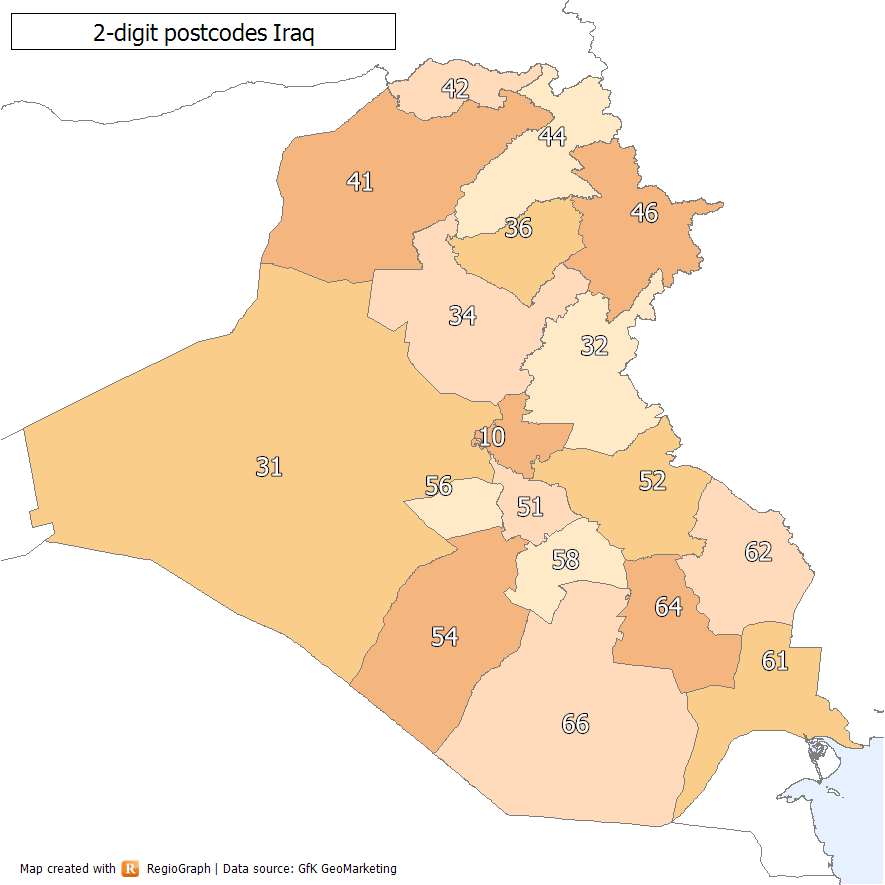
2-digit postcode areas Iraq(defined through the first two postcode digits)

governorate	code range
Al Anbar Governorate	31
Al Basrah Governorate	61
Al Muthanna Governorate	66
Al Najaf Governorate	54
Al Quadisiya Governorate	58
Al Sulaymaniah Governorate	46
Al Ta'amim Governorate	36
Erbil Governorate	44
Babil Governorate	51
Baghdad Governorate	10
Dahouk Governorate	42
Deyala Governorate	32
Karbala Governorate	56
Maysan Governorate	62
Mosul Governorate / Nainawa Governorate	41
Salah Al Deen Governorate	34
Thi Qar Governorate	64
Wasit Governorate	52
