= Postal codes in Bhutan =

A map of Bhutan showing its 20 dzongkhags

Postal codes in Bhutan are five digit numbers.

Coding method
Digit	Description
1st Digit	Postal region or Dzongdey
2nd Digit	District or Dzongkhag
3rd Digit	Sub district or Dungkhag
Last 2 Digits	Delivery area
