= Postal codes in Puerto Rico =

Postal codes in Puerto Rico, a United States commonwealth, are part of the United States ZIP code system. Puerto Rico is allocated the ZIP codes 00600 to 00799 and 00900 to 00999; the 008xx codes are allocated to the nearby United States Virgin Islands. Both Puerto Rico and the U.S. Virgin Islands are served from the sectional center facility (SCF) of San Juan, Puerto Rico.

ZIP codes in the 006xx range are used in northwestern Puerto Rico; 007xx in southeast Puerto Rico; and 009xx in the San Juan Metropolitan Area. As in the rest of the United States, the fourth and fifth digits designate a post office or town; or in densely populated areas, an area or borough of a city. Originally, the ZIP codes were arranged in consecutive alphabetical order, with the 006xx range covering the offices from A to L, and the 007xx range covering the offices from M to Z.

Each ZIP code is divided into ZIP+4 codes, just as in the rest of the United States. For example, in the ZIP+4 code 00716-2604, the basic ZIP code 00716 is the east section of the city of Ponce; and within 00716, the suffix 2604 is a section of Aceitillo Street in the Los Caobos neighborhood zip code.
