= Postal codes in Jamaica =

There are currently 304 postal codes in Jamaica, with one and two-digit sector codes only being used in Kingston, the country's capital.

A plan to introduce a postcode system, was first announced on June 6, 2005. This was to assist the Postal Corporation of Jamaica's international partners in the United States, United Kingdom and Canada to sort letters bound for Jamaica, and to avoid confusion with destinations of Japan or Jamaica in Long Island in the US.

Despite reports in the Sunday Observer in 2006 that it would be ready introduced by the end of that year, the system was not brought into force because plans to introduce it to Kingston in July 2005 were put on hold due to the fact that the public had difficulty understanding the system.

On February 12, 2007 it was announced that the postcode project had been suspended indefinitely.

The codes were planned to be alphanumeric, in the format: JMAPPNN, where

- JM is the ISO 3166-1 alpha-2 country code
- A is a letter for one of four zones
- PP are two letters for a parish
- NN is a two-digit number for a post office

== Division of postal codes ==
The zones were described in a press release of Jamaica Post 18 July 2005, the encoding of the post offices one week later on 25 July 2005. The four zones into which the parishes are divided does not correspond with the traditional division of parishes into counties. The parish codes are as follows.

- Zone A parishes
  - Kingston: KN
  - St. Andrew: AW
  - St. Catherine: CE
- Zone B parishes
  - St. Thomas: TS
  - Portland: PD
  - St. Mary: MY
- Zone C parishes
  - Hanover: HR
  - St. James: JS
  - Trelawny: TY
  - St. Ann: AN
- Zone D parishes
  - Clarendon: CN
  - Manchester: MR
  - St. Elizabeth: EH
  - Westmoreland: WD

== Relationship to existing postal zones ==
Although Kingston, the country's capital, along with part of the parish of St Andrew, was already subdivided into postal zones, these were not incorporated into the new codes. For example, JMAAW03 was to be the postcode for Kingston 8, rather than JMAAW08, which was to be the postcode for Half Way Tree, in Kingston 10, while the postcode for Vineyard Town, Kingston 3 was to have been JMAAW20.

== See also Kingston 5 ==
- ISO 3166-2:JM
- Subdivisions of Jamaica
- Parishes of Jamaica
