= Iraqi Telecommunications and Post Company =

Republic of Iraq Iraqi Telecommunications and Post Company
- الشركة العامة للإتصالات والبريد
- Emblem of Iraq

Agency overview
- Jurisdiction: Iraq
- Headquarters: Baghdad
- Agency executive: Abdulmajid Abdulhamid, Director
- Parent agency: Ministry of Communications (Iraq)
- Child agency: Iraqi Post

The Iraqi Telecommunication and Post Company (ITPC) is a government-owned and operated corporation responsible for providing telecommunication and mail services in Iraq.

== See also ==
- Postage stamps and postal history of Iraq
