= Postal codes in Singapore =

Postal codes in Singapore have consisted of six digits since 1995, replacing the four-digit system introduced in 1979. They are administered by Singapore Post.

== Postal districts ==
Singapore has 28 postal districts Singpore.

== History ==
Singapore was originally divided into 28 postal districts on 6 March 1950, with a number being allocated to each district. For example, the Orchard Road area was in District 9.

277 Orchard Road
Singapore 9

This was superseded by a new four-digit system on 1 July 1979, with the last two digits representing a sector in each district. There were in total 81 sectors.

277 Orchard Road
Singapore 0923

On 1 September 1995, this was replaced by a six-digit system, in which every building was given its unique postcode, the first two digits of which represented the old sector, i.e. 23.

277 Orchard Road
Singapore 238858

Although the old districts are no longer used by Singapore Post, they are still widely used to refer to locations of properties for sale or rent.

== 6-digit postal code ==
The 6-digit postal code is made up of the sector code and the delivery point. The sector is represented by the first two numbers of the postal code. The remaining four numbers define the delivery point within the sector. e.g.

53 Ang Mo Kio Avenue 3
Singapore 569933

56 is the sector code; 9933 is the delivery point, i.e. house or building.

For Housing and Development Board (HDB) residential blocks, the block number is included in the postal code. e.g.

Blk 145 Lorong 2 Toa Payoh
Singapore 310145

HDB residential blocks with the same number in the same postal sector are differentiated by their postal codes as follows:

Blk 147 Simei Street 2
Singapore 520147

Blk 147 Tampines Avenue 5
Singapore 521147

Similarly, for a HDB residential block sharing the same number as another block in the same postal sector, but have an added suffix behind are differentiated by their postal codes as follows:

Blk 150 Bishan Street 11
Singapore 570150

Blk 150A Bishan Street 11
Singapore 571150

The postal codes for private residential, commercial and industrial houses and buildings are assigned based on the alphabetical sequence of the street names in each sector. This means that the codes for a particular postal sector have been assigned first to houses and buildings located along street names beginning with 'A', followed by 'B' and so on. The postal codes for such properties do not contain the corresponding house or building numbers included in the postal code. HDB industrial and commercial blocks also use this system.

== Use for navigation ==
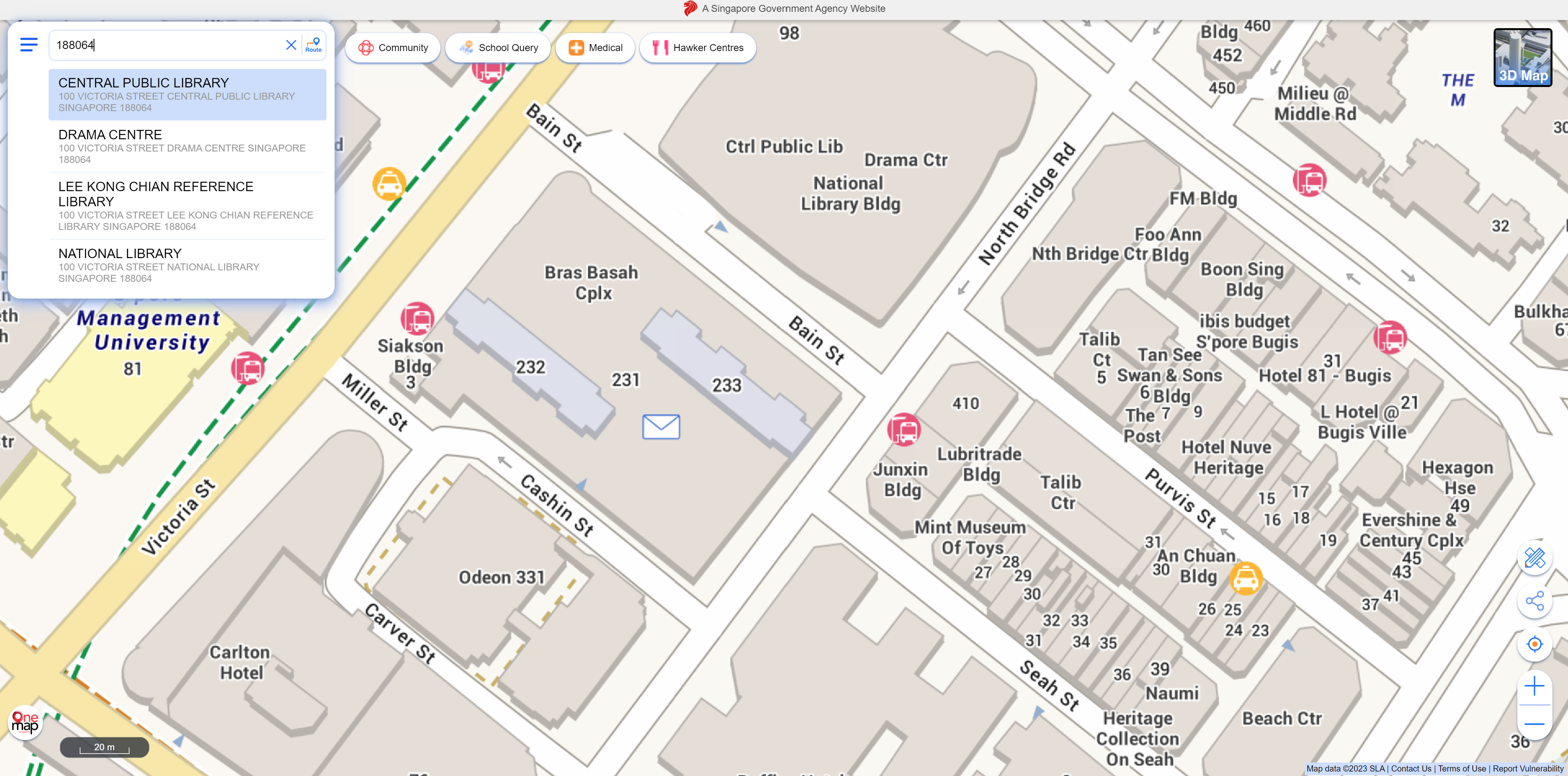
Using the 6-digit postal code to look up the Central Public Library in the OneMap application.

Due to Singapore being a small city-state and most buildings having singular, dedicated delivery points, the postal code can be used as a succinct and precise identifier of buildings in Singapore, akin to a geocode. For example, in Google Maps and Citymapper, the user can conveniently locate a Singaporean building by only supplying its 6-digit postal code, skipping all other address details.
