= Postal codes in Vietnam =

Postal codes in Vietnam have five digits.

The exact postal code designated for local government areas, local post offices, government offices or embassies and consulates can be searched on National Postal Code Website.

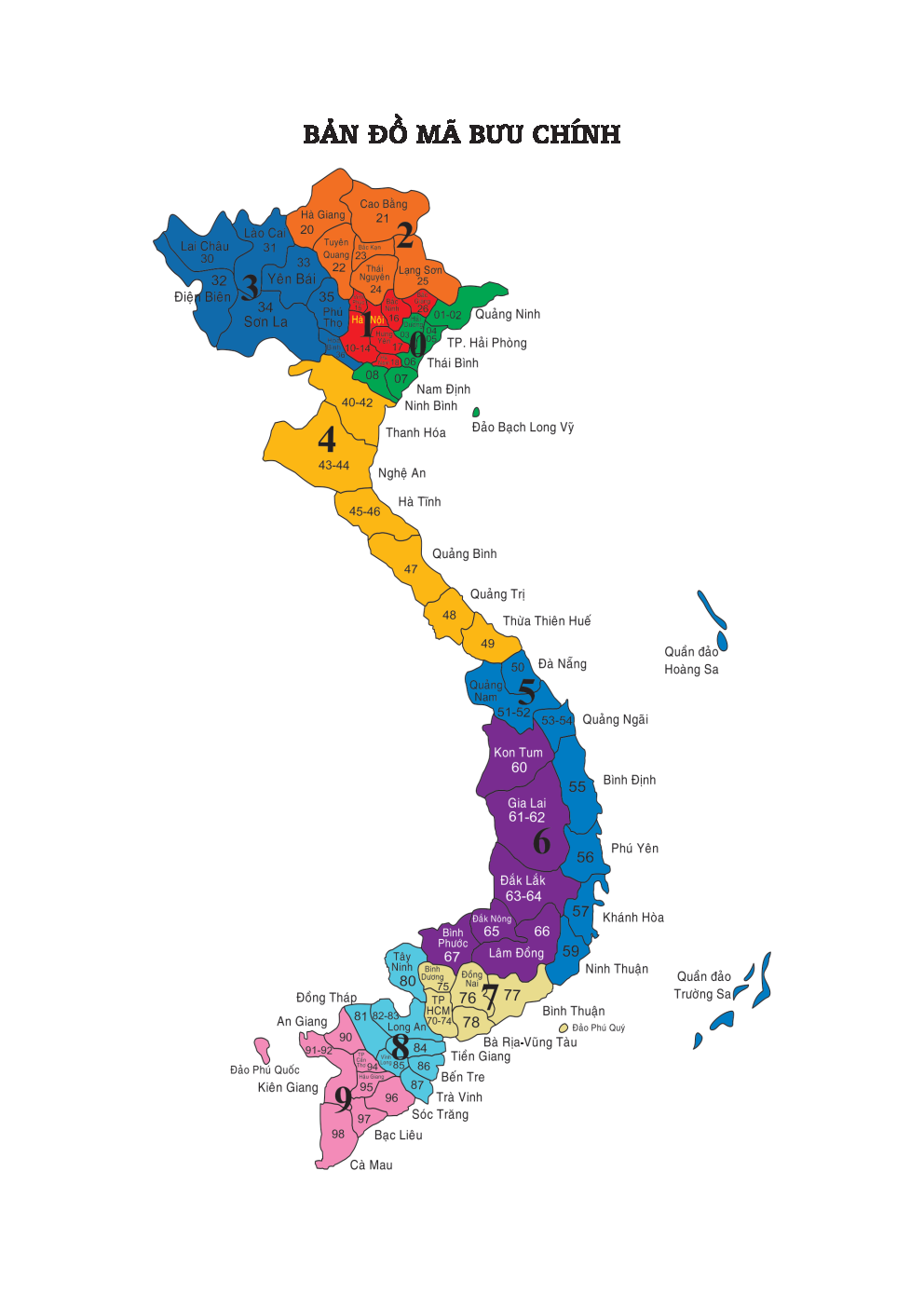
Regional and provincial postal codes of Viet Nam

== Structure ==
The postal code system of Vietnam has officially been changed from 6 digits to 5 digits. Each country has its own separate postal code or zip code system. The postal code of Vietnam is composed of 5 digits, with the following meanings:

- The first digit determines the area code.
- The first two characters identify the centrally-governed province or city.
- The first four characters identify the district or corresponding administrative unit.

Based on this, the postal code system of Vietnam has been changed to optimize and improve the domestic mail and parcel delivery system.

== List ==
Below is a table listing the postal codes and telephone area codes in Vietnam (according to Vietnam Post, under the VNPOST corporation). Note: The provinces and cities are listed in order from North to South, and the centrally-governed cities are highlighted in bold.

Province/city name	Postcode(s)	Telephone area code(s)
Hà Giang	20xxx	219
Cao Bằng	21xxx	206
Bắc Kạn	23xxx	209
Tuyên Quang	22xxx	207
Lào Cai	31xxx	214
Điện Biên	32xxx	215
Lai Châu	30xxx	213
Sơn La	34xxx	212
Yên Bái	33xxx	216
Hòa Bình	36xxx	218
Thái Nguyên	24xxx	208
Lạng Sơn	25xxx	205
Quảng Ninh	01xxx–02xxx	203
Bắc Giang	26xxx	204
Phú Thọ	35xxx	210
Vĩnh Phúc	15xxx	211
Bắc Ninh	16xxx	222
**Hà Nội**	10xxx–14xxx	242–248
Hải Dương	03xxx	220
**Hải Phòng**	04xxx–05xxx	225
Hưng Yên	17xxx	221
Thái Bình	06xxx	227
Hà Nam	18xxx	226
Nam Định	07xxx	228
Ninh Bình	08xxx	229
Thanh Hoá	40xxx–42xxx	237
Nghệ An	43xxx–44xxx	238
Hà Tĩnh	45xxx–46xxx	239
Quảng Bình	47xxx	232
Quảng Trị	48xxx	233
**Huế**	49xxx	234
**Đà Nẵng**	50xxx	236
Quảng Nam	51xxx–52xxx	235
Quảng Ngãi	53xxx–54xxx	255
Kon Tum	60xxx	260
Gia Lai	61xxx–62xxx	269
Bình Định	55xxx	256
Phú Yên	56xxx	257
Đắk Lắk	63xxx–64xxx	262
Khánh Hoà	57xxx	258
Đắk Nông	65xxx	261
Lâm Đồng	66xxx	263
Ninh Thuận	59xxx	259
Bình Phước	67xxx	271
Tây Ninh	80xxx	276
Bình Dương	75xxx	274
Đồng Nai	76xxx	251
Bình Thuận	77xxx	252
**Ho Chi Minh City**	70xxx–74xxx	282–287
Long An	82xxx–83xxx	272
Bà Rịa – Vũng Tàu	78xxx	254
Đồng Tháp	81xxx	277
An Giang	90xxx	296
Tiền Giang	84xxx	273
Vĩnh Long	85xxx	270
Bến Tre	86xxx	275
**Cần Thơ**	94xxx	292
Kiên Giang	91xxx–92xxx	297
Trà Vinh	87xxx	274
Hậu Giang	95xxx	293
Sóc Trăng	96xxx	299
Bạc Liêu	97xxx	291
Cà Mau	98xxx	290
