= Postal codes in the Cayman Islands =

Postal codes in the Cayman Islands are used by the Cayman Islands Postal Service to route inbound mail to groups of post office boxes in the country. A postal code typically consists of an island code, a hyphen separator, and a section code. They were introduced in 2006.

The name of each island functions as the "post town"; the name of the settlement or locality is not used to route mail. There are only three island codes: KY1 for Grand Cayman, KY2 for Cayman Brac, and KY3 for Little Cayman. Each of these is subdivided into section codes according to which local post office handles a particular group of boxes.
