= Postal codes in France =

Postal codes were introduced in France in 1964, when La Poste introduced automated sorting. They were updated to use the current 5 digit system in 1972.

France uses five-digit numeric postal codes, the first two digits representing the département in which the city is located. The département numbers were assigned alphabetically between 1860 and 1870, but later changes (such as renaming and splitting of départements) mean that the list is no longer in strictly alphabetical order. The system extends to French overseas departments and territories, and also includes Monaco. Note that postcodes in both départements of Corsica commence with the "20" historically assigned to Corsica before it was split into two départements, which are now numbered 2A and 2B.

The last three digits identify a more precise location, 000 being in general reserved for the préfecture. However, in Paris, Lyon and Marseille, the last two digits indicate the arrondissement. For example, 80000 corresponds to Amiens, which is the préfecture of the Somme or département 80, while 69008 corresponds to the 8th arrondissement of Lyon.

== Format ==
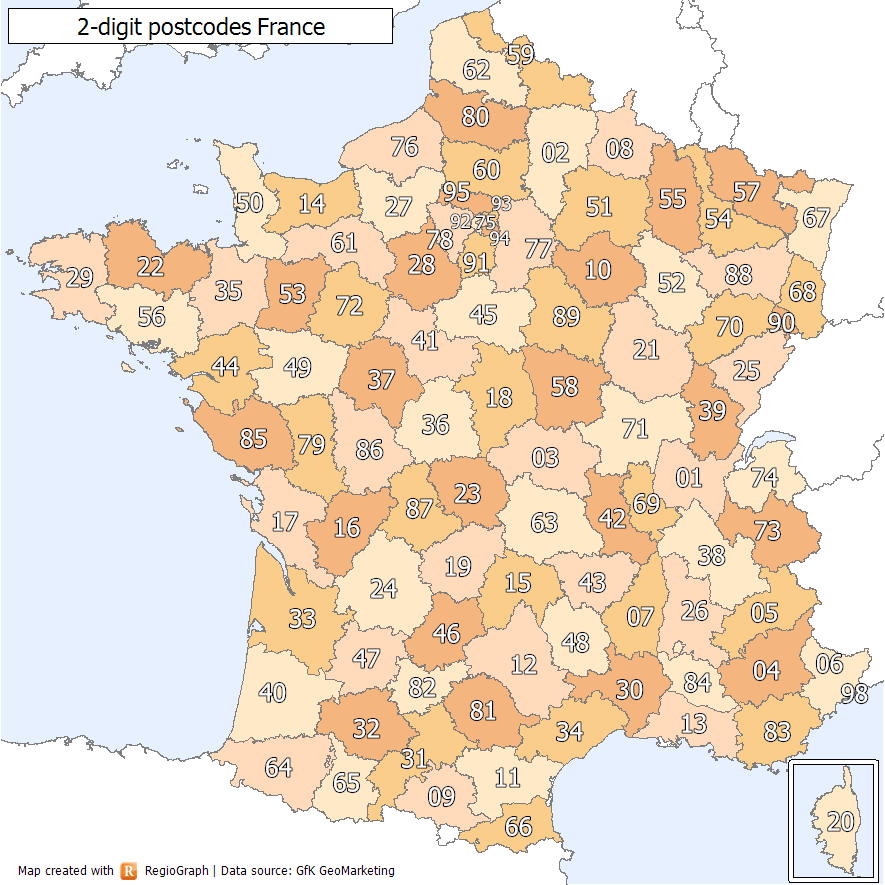
Two-digit postcode areas of metropolitan France (defined through the first two postcode digits)

The postal code (French: code postal) consists of five digits. In metropolitan France the first two digits are the number of the département where the post office in charge of delivery to a town is located. There are some places where this is different from the department where the place is located. In the Overseas Departments and Territories, the first three digits identify the département or territory. The digits 00 are used for Military addresses. The digits 20 are used for all of Corsica; the split of the island into two départements was not followed by a change in the postal codes.

The next three digits identify the local postal office in charge of mail delivery. A regular postcode always ends with a 0, with the notable exception of Paris, Lyon and Marseille – see below – and the Overseas Départements and Territories. Postcodes not ending with a 0 may indicate a special code, known as CEDEX (see below), or newest postcodes.

When spoken, the department number is pronounced separately. For example, the postal code of Schiltigheim (67300) would be pronounced as soixante-sept, trois cents (67, 300).

In Paris, Lyon and Marseille, the last two digits of the postal code indicate the municipal arrondissement. Prior to 1972, an address in the eighth municipal arrondissement of Paris, would be written as:

8 rue Chambiges
Paris 8^{e}

This number was incorporated into the postal code as:

8 rue Chambiges
75008 Paris

The 16th arrondissement of Paris has two postal codes, 75016 (south) and 75116 (north).

In each département, the préfecture (main city) has a postal code ending with 000, for example Bourges in Cher:

15 avenue du Général Leclerc
18000 Bourges

The more important the city, the simpler the postal code. The sous-préfectures are generally recognized by using a XXX00 postcode (but a few additional XXX00 postcodes may also be allocated in the most populated préfectures to subdivide them into several postal distribution areas, XX000 being still used for the most central post office of the city). Here is for example the postal code of a small village, Lépaud in Creuse:

16 grande rue
23170 Lépaud

Another example with Pouillé-les-Côteaux in Loire-Atlantique:

17 rue de la Cour
44522 Pouillé-les-Côteaux

And the postal code of Mortagne-au-Perche, sous-préfecture of the Département de l'Orne:

4 rue des Quinze Fusillés
61400 Mortagne-au-Perche

It is not rare that many adjacent villages share the same postal code, which is primarily associated with a bigger post office, e.g.: 64150 can correspond to Abidos, Bésingrand, Lagor, Lahourcade, Mourenx, Noguère, Os Marsillon, Pardies, Sauvelade and Vielleségure. It may happen that a village is associated with a bigger post office in another département, thus its postcode begins with the two digits of another département. For example, Le Fresne-sur-Loire, in Loire-Atlantique, uses 49123, while its postcode should normally start with 44, because it is associated with the post office of Ingrandes, a neighbouring commune in Maine-et-Loire.

Overseas Départements and Territories use 3-digit codes starting with : 971 (Guadeloupe), 972 (Martinique), 973 (French Guiana), 974 (Réunion), 975 (Saint-Pierre and Miquelon), 976 (Mayotte), 984 (French Southern Territories), 986 (Wallis and Futuna), 987 (French Polynesia), 988 (New Caledonia). In March 2008 La Poste proposed allotting 977 to Saint Barthélemy and 978 to Saint Martin due to their new status as overseas collectivities. In this case, the last zero is dropped so as to keep the 5-digit format. This is why the regular postcodes for these do not end with 0 except for the préfecture or sous-préfecture, for example:

Maison du Port
97100 Basse-Terre

4 boulevard du Général de Gaulle
97320 Saint-Laurent du Maroni

193 RN2
97439 Sainte-Rose

== CEDEX ==
There is also a system known as CEDEX, Courrier d'Entreprise à Distribution EXceptionnelle ('business mail with special delivery'), designed for recipients of large volumes of mail. A postal code is allocated to each large organisation or to post office box holders, ending in three unique digits, for example:

12 rue de Broquedis
64205 Biarritz CEDEX

CEDEX should always be written in capitals. It may be followed by a number, if the town has more than one post office, or if it is split into arrondissements.

Ordinary deliveries would be addressed to:

12 rue de Broquedis
64200 Biarritz

It is acceptable to include a boîte postale ('post office box') number (abbreviated as BP nnnn) as well as the street address in CEDEX addresses.

== Monaco ==
Although an independent country, Monaco is part of the French postal code system as if it were a French department, numbered, with codes consisting of 980 and two digits, with 00 being used for deliveries to all physical addresses in the Principality, and 01 to 99 being used for special types of delivery. However the destination country on inbound mail must be specified as "Monaco", not "France".

12 avenue de la Costa
98000 Monaco
MONACO

23 avenue Prince Héréditaire Albert
98025 Monaco CEDEX
MONACO

== See also ==
- Departments of France
