= Postal codes in Montserrat =

Postal codes in Montserrat are used by the Montserrat Postal Service to route mail to groups of post office boxes in the country.

A postal code is made up of the country code "MSR" and four digits: these represent the parish, the postal district, and the final two the distribution area or PO box range.

There are eight postcodes in use, one for each sub post office:

Postal code	Area
MSR1110	GPO (Brades) and PO boxes
MSR1120	Little Bay
MSR1210	Davy Hill
MSR1230	St John's
MSR1250	Look Out
MSR1310	Cudjoe Head
MSR1330	St Peter's
MSR1350	Salem
