= Postal codes in the Czech Republic =

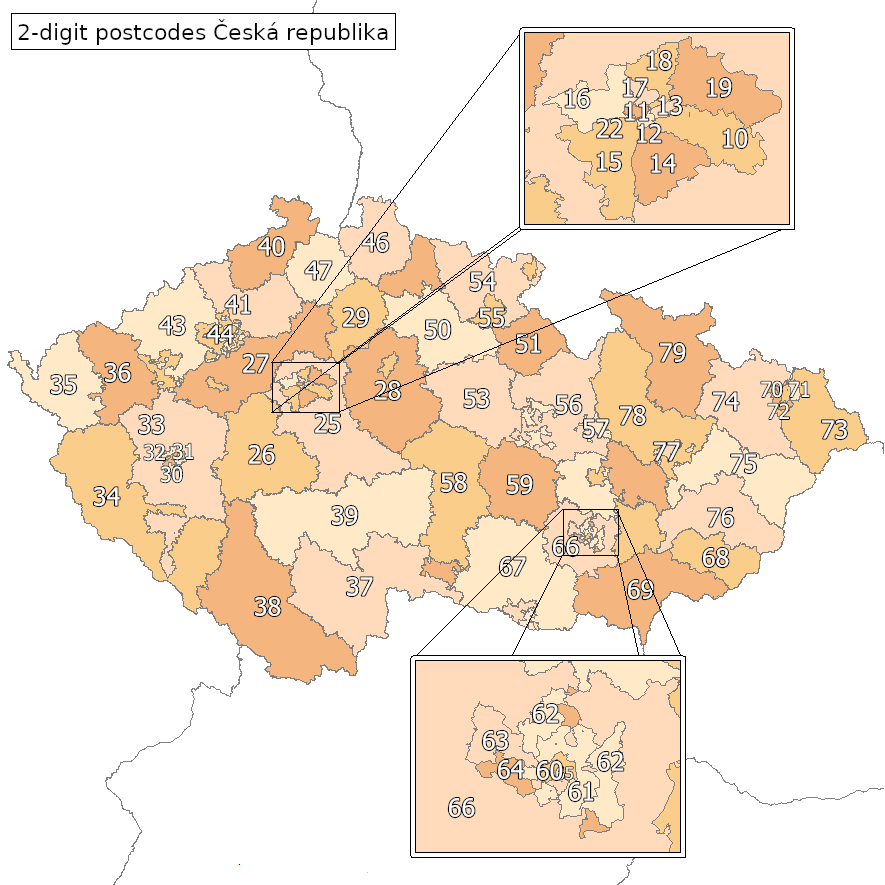
2-digit postcode areas of the Czech Republic (defined through the first two postcode digits).

Postal codes in the Czech Republic are called PSČ (PSČ, stands for Czech: Poštovní směrovací číslo, pronounced [ˈpoʃtovɲiː ˈsmɲɛrovatsiː ˈtʃiːslo] - postal routing number). The acronym is commonly pronounced as a word ([ˈpəsətʃə]), rather than separate letters ([ˈpɛː.ɛs.tʃɛː]). The system was introduced in former Czechoslovakia in 1973 and has remained unchanged.

== Postal code format ==
The postal code consists of five digits, usually written with a space in the form XXX XX. The first digit indicates a region (i.e. regions of Czechoslovakia as of the time when the PSČ system was put into use, hence some differences from the current administrative divisions):

- 1 - the capital of the Czech Republic, Prague (second digit represents one of 10 Prague districts, so e.g. 160 00 is the main post office in Prague 6 - Dejvice).
- 2 - central Bohemia (272 01 Kladno, 280 01 Kolín). Numbers 200 00 - 249 99 are reserved for internal needs of the postal system itself and are not assigned to any region. The Prague central distribution post office uses 225 00.
- 3 - western and southern Bohemia (301 00 - 326 00 Plzeň, 360 01 Karlovy Vary, 370 01 České Budějovice)
- 4 - northern Bohemia (400 01 Ústí nad Labem, 460 01 Liberec)
- 5 - eastern Bohemia and western Moravia (500 01 Hradec Králové, 530 01 Pardubice, 541 01 Trutnov, 586 01 Jihlava)
- 6 - southern Moravia (600 00 - 659 99 Brno, 690 01 Břeclav)
- 7 - eastern and northern Moravia (779 00 Olomouc, 760 01 Zlín, 700 01 - 729 99 Ostrava)
- 8 - the capital of Slovakia, Bratislava. The second digit represents one of the five districts of Bratislava. The codes 860 01-899 99 are not assigned to any region and serve for internal purposes of the postal system.
- 9 - southern and western Slovakia: 911 01 Trenčín, 917 01 Trnava, 949 01 Nitra, 960 01 Zvolen, 974 01 Banská Bystrica, 984 01 Lučenec
- 0 - northern and eastern Slovakia: 010 01 Žilina, 036 01 Martin, 040 01 - 044 99 Košice, 058 01 Poprad, 071 01 Michalovce, 080 01 Prešov).

Addresses with large mail traffic can get their own postal code.

== Format ==
When writing the address, the postal code is put in front of the town name; when typed or printed, 1 space separates the leading 3 digits from the trailing 2 digits, and 2 spaces separate the postal code from the town name, e.g.:

Na Příkopě 28
115 03 Praha 1

== International mail ==
On postal items being sent from abroad it is recommended to prepend the postal code with the ISO 3166-1 two-letter code of the country and a dash:

Na Příkopě 28
CZ-115 03 Praha 1
the Czech Republic

On envelopes and postcards there are usually five rectangular boxes below the address field for the postal code digits.

== See also ==
- ISO 3166-2:CZ
