= Postal codes in the British Virgin Islands =

Postal codes in the British Virgin Islands are used by the British Virgin Islands postal service, BVI Post, to route mail in the island

Postal codes are composed of a country code, "VG", and four digits. This postal code format came into effect in October 2006; the final two digits in the code specify the delivery area.

There are six postal codes in use:

Postal code	Area
VG1110	Tortola Central
VG1120	Tortola East
VG1130	Tortola West
VG1140	Anegada
VG1150	Virgin Gorda
VG1160	Jost Van Dyke
