= National Level Addressing Grid =

Indian geo-coded digital addressing system

The National Level Addressing Grid, commercially known as DIGIPIN (Digital Postal Index Number), is a standardised, geo-coded addressing system established by the Department of Posts in India. Functioning as a Digital Public Infrastructure (DPI), it divides the country's geographical territory into uniform units of approximately 4 metres by 4 metres, assigning a unique 10-digit alphanumeric code to each unit derived from its latitude and longitude coordinates. Developed in collaboration with the Indian Institute of Technology (IIT) Hyderabad and the National Remote Sensing Centre (NRSC) of the Indian Space Research Organisation (ISRO), DIGIPIN is designed to serve as a robust, permanent digital addressing infrastructure available for both online and offline use.

== Background and Development ==
In October 2021, the Department of Posts released an approach paper proposing a "Digital Address Code" (DAC) to address issues related to address authentication and delivery efficiency. The proposal highlighted the need for a unique address identity linked to geospatial coordinates, noting that traditional descriptive addresses often fail to meet the requirements of digital authentication and precise location identification. This initiative evolved into the DIGIPIN project. In March 2025, the Ministry of Communications released the final technical document for DIGIPIN, establishing it as the foundation layer of the national addressing DPI. The final version incorporated feedback from public and expert consultations on earlier beta versions. Key modifications in the final version included adjusting the system's bounding box and replacing specific characters (changing G, W, and X to C, F, and T) to improve phonetic and visual clarity.

On May 27, 2025 Indian post introduced a 10 digit unique identification number to each and every address in India, based on geo coordinates called DIGIPIN. Digital Address Code (DAC) will be assigned to all types of addresses in the country ranging from independent houses, individual building, every flat in the given apartment, every shop in a commercial building and every individual unit in an office complex. Draft approach paper on Digital Address Code was issued by Indian Post for public comments.

== System Architecture ==
=== Grid Structure and Encoding ===
DIGIPIN is an alpha-numeric grid system that functions strictly as an encoding of latitude and longitude coordinates.

- Grid Units: The system divides India into specific units measuring approximately 4m x 4m at the equator.
- Code Format: Each unit is assigned a 10-character code using a specific set of 16 alphanumeric symbols: 2, 3, 4, 5, 6, 7, 8, 9, C, F, J, K, L, M, P, and T.
- Hierarchy: The encoding creates a hierarchical partition. A bounding box covering the country is split into 16 regions (Level 1), which are recursively subdivided into 16 sub-regions up to 10 levels.
- Directionality: The labelling of grids follows an anti-clockwise spiral pattern, infusing the code with a sense of directionality where consecutive symbols represent geographical neighbours.

=== Geospatial Extent ===
The system operates within a specific bounding box designed to align with the Survey of India's topographical sheet numbering system and covers the entirety of the Indian landmass and its maritime Exclusive Economic Zone (EEZ).

- Longitude: 63.5° E – 99.5° E.
- Latitude: 2.5° N – 38.5° N.
- Coordinate Reference System: The system uses EPSG:4326 (WGS84 datum) due to its global adoption and simplicity.

=== Precision ===
The size of the grid squares decreases as the code length increases, offering varying levels of precision:

- Level 1 (1 digit): Represents a 9° x 9° region (approx. 1000 km).
- Level 6 (6 digits): Represents a ~1 km x 1 km area.
- Level 10 (10 digits): Represents a ~3.8 m x 3.8 m area.

== Key Features ==
- Offline Availability: DIGIPIN is designed to function offline, allowing users to locate addresses logically without requiring constant internet connectivity.
- Privacy: The system is a pure function of geographic coordinates and does not store personal data or link individuals to locations, thereby preserving privacy.
- Permanence: The code is independent of physical infrastructure. Changes to road networks, building names, or administrative boundaries (such as city or state names) do not alter the DIGIPIN of a location.
- Inclusivity: The system provides precise addresses for unstructured locations, including rural areas, forests, and maritime regions within the Exclusive economic zone, which often lack traditional street addresses.

== Applications ==
The Department of Posts envisions DIGIPIN enabling "Address as a Service" (AaaS) across various sectors.

- Emergency Services: The high precision of the grid facilitates faster response times for emergency services by pinpointing exact locations.
- Logistics and Navigation: The codes can be integrated into navigation systems to improve last-mile delivery and logistics efficiency.
- Public Service Delivery: It aids in the efficient delivery of government schemes and beneficiary onboarding by ensuring accurate address capture.
- Financial Services: The Banking, Financial Services, and Insurance (BFSI) sector can utilise the grid to enhance the accuracy of Know Your Customer (KYC) processes.

== Comparison with Traditional Systems ==
Unlike the traditional Postal Index Number (PIN) code, which identifies a broad locality or post office jurisdiction, a DIGIPIN identifies a specific geospatial coordinate with high precision. DIGIPIN is intended to complement, not replace, the conventional postal address system, acting as an additional layer that bridges the gap between physical locations and their digital representation. While traditional addresses rely on street names and landmarks which may change, DIGIPIN remains static.

== See also ==
- Digital Postal Index Number
