= Postal codes in Denmark =

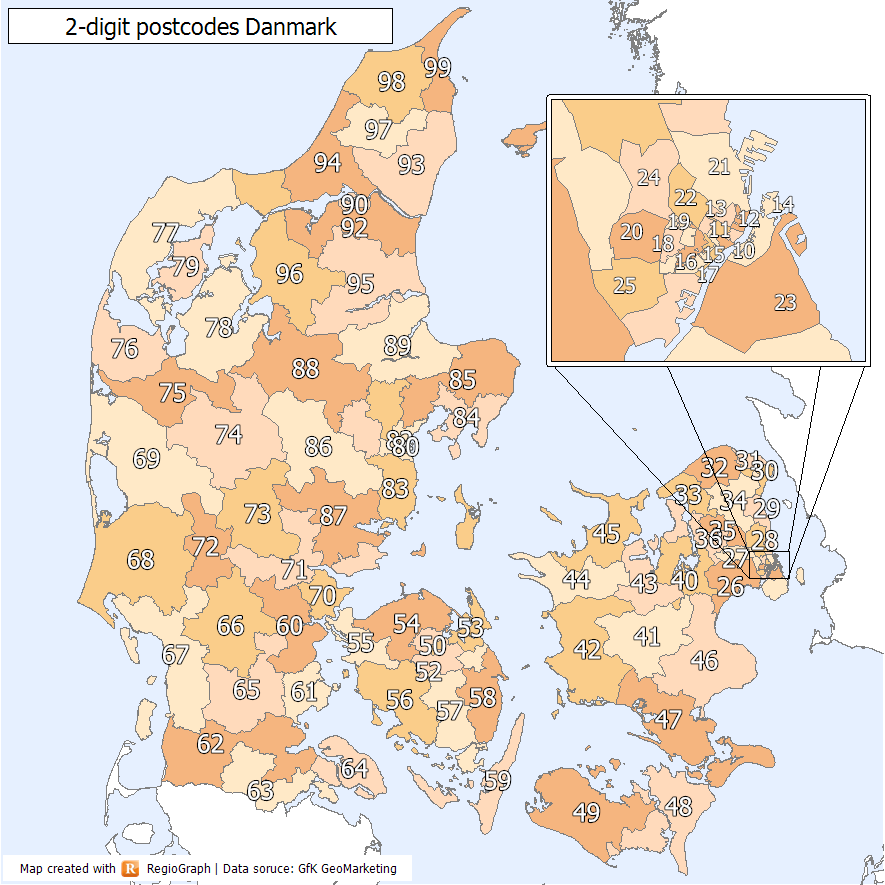
Postcode areas of Denmark indicated by the first two postcode digits. The map does not show Bornholm (37xx)

Postal codes in Denmark are determined by a four digit system that was introduced in 1967. The only exceptions are five special purpose 3-digit codes.

The self-governing territory of Greenland is part of the Danish system (39xx). Historically, the Faroe Islands also formed part of the Danish postal code system using the 38xx range and the prefix "FR", but this was changed to a new format consisting of a three-digit code and the country code "FO", with FR 3800 Tórshavn becoming FO-110 Tórshavn.

== Format ==
The code is written before the city name. For example:

- 1000 København C
- 6100 Haderslev
- DK-9000 Aalborg

New regulations add the country code DK to the postal codes, but in practice it is most often omitted. DK or Denmark must be used when mailed from abroad.

Ministry of Foreign Affairs of Denmark
Asiatisk Plads 2
1448 Copenhagen K

Or in Danish:

Udenrigsministeriet
Asiatisk Plads 2
1448 København K

== Postal code ranges ==
The postal codes follow a geographic pattern and most Danes can tell which region an address belongs to based on the postal code alone.

- 0000–0999: special postal codes, reserved for government use, post offices and package centers
- 1000–2999: Copenhagen and the surrounding area
- 3000–3699: North Zealand
- 3700–3799: Bornholm
- 3800–3899: formerly used for the Faroe Islands, no longer in use.
- 3900–3999: Greenland
- 4000–4999: Zealand (excluding North Zealand and the capital region), Lolland-Falster, and Møn
- 5000–5999: Funen and its surrounding islands
- 6000–9999: Jutland

Note that Santa Claus has his own postal code in Greenland, 2412, corresponding to the date for Christmas Eve.
