= Codice di avviamento postale =

Five digit Italian post code system

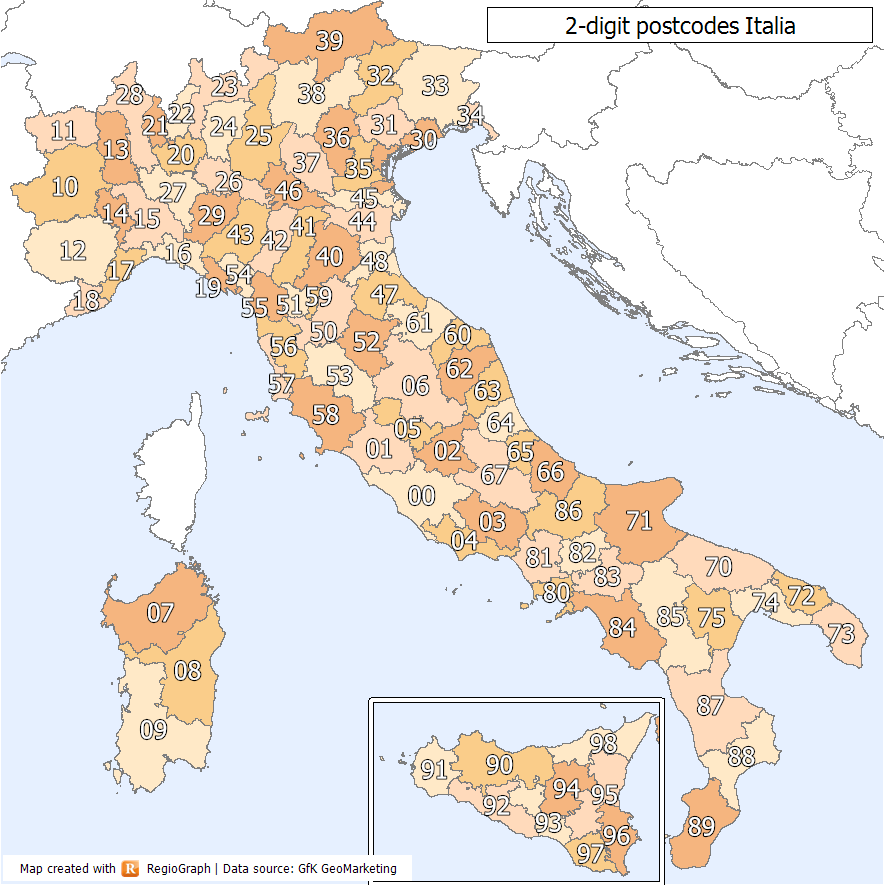
Two-digit postcode areas Italy (defined through the first two postcode digits)

Codice di avviamento postale (Italian for 'Postal Routing Code'; CAP) is the Italian post code numeric system, created in 1967. It consists of five digits: the first two denote the administrative province (sometimes shared by two or more provinces for those that have been split after 1967); the third indicates if the town is the chief town of the province (odd number, usually 1 or 9, e.g. 07100 for Sassari) or not (even, usually 0 or 8, e.g. 10015 for Ivrea); the last two designate the specific town or village, (only in provinces created after 1992) the delivery post office, or, in large cities like Rome, Milan, Naples, or Venice, the urban postal district (usually 00 or 70 in minor provincial chief towns). San Marino and the Vatican City are integrated into the Italian postcode system.
