= Iraq Post =

Iraqi government-owned corporation

- البريد العراقي

Agency overview
- Jurisdiction: Government of Iraq
- Headquarters: Baghdad
- Agency executive: Zaineb Al-Banna, Director General
- Parent agency: Iraq Post
- Website: post.iq

Iraqi Post, also referred to in official announcements as the General Company for Post and Savings, is a government-owned corporation that handles postal services in Iraq. It operates as a subsidiary of the Iraqi Telecommunications and Post Company (ITPC), under the Ministry of Communications.

== See also ==
- Postage stamps and postal history of Iraq
