= Postal codes in Ecuador =

Postal codes in Ecuador have six numeric digits. The first two specify the province, the next two the district and the final two the zip code. For example, in the postal code 170515, 17 is Pichincha Province, 05 is the district and 15 the ZIP.
