= Postal code =

Series of letters and digits for sorting mail

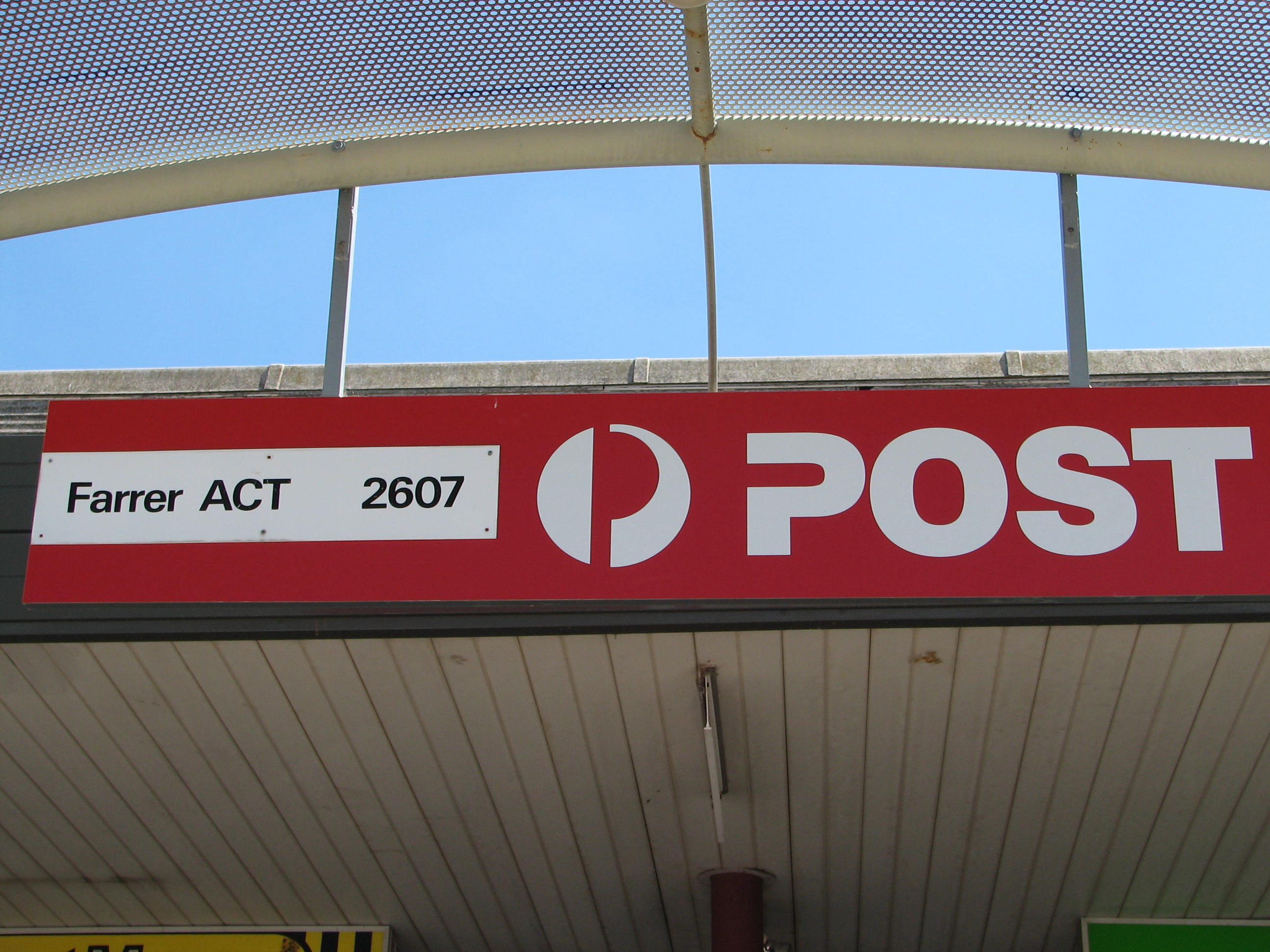
Post office sign in Farrer, Australian Capital Territory, showing postcode 2607

A postal code (also known locally in various English-speaking countries throughout the world as a postcode, post code, PIN or ZIP Code) is a series of letters or digits or both, sometimes including spaces or punctuation, included in a postal address for the purpose of sorting mail.

As of February 2025, the Universal Postal Union lists 192 countries which require the use of a postal code.

Although postal codes are usually assigned to geographical areas, special codes are sometimes assigned to individual addresses or to institutions that receive large volumes of mail, such as government agencies and large commercial companies. One example is the French CEDEX system.

== Terms ==
There are a number of synonyms for postal code; some are country-specific:

- CAP: The standard term in Italy; CAP is an acronym for codice di avviamento postale ('postal expedition code').
- CEP: The standard term in Brazil; CEP is an acronym for código de endereçamento postal ('postal addressing code').
- Eircode: The standard term in Ireland, the first "official house-number scale" postal code.
- NPA in French-speaking Switzerland (numéro postal d'acheminement) and Italian-speaking Switzerland (numero postale di avviamento).
- PIN: The standard term in India; PIN is an acronym for Postal Index Number. Sometimes called a PIN code.
- PLZ: The standard term in Germany, Austria, German-speaking Switzerland and Liechtenstein; PLZ is an abbreviation of Postleit‌zahl ('postal routing number').
- Postal code: The general term is used in Canada.
- Postcode: This solid compound is popular in many English-speaking countries and is also the standard term in the Netherlands.
- Postal index: This term is used in Eastern European countries such as Belarus, Moldova, Russia, Ukraine, etc.
- PSČ: The standard term in Slovakia and the Czech Republic; PSČ is an acronym for Poštové smerovacie číslo (in Slovak) or Poštovní směrovací číslo (in Czech), both meaning postal routing number.
- ZIP Code: The standard term in the United States and the Philippines; ZIP is an acronym for Zone Improvement Plan.

== History ==
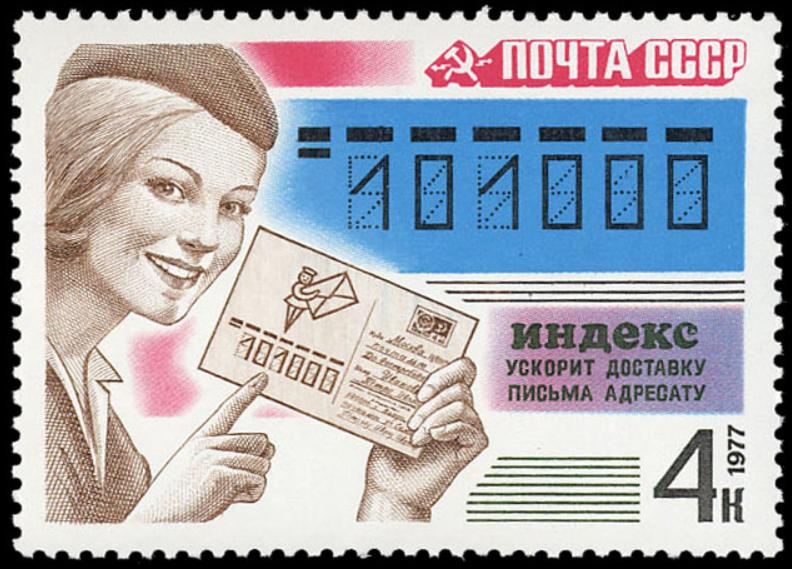
1977 Soviet stamp promoting the use of postal codes

The development of postal codes happened first in large cities. Postal codes began with postal district numbers (or postal zone numbers) within large cities. London was first subdivided into 10 districts in 1857 (EC (East Central), WC (West Central), N, NE, E, SE, S, SW, W, and NW), four were created to cover Liverpool in 1864; and Manchester/Salford was split into eight numbered districts in 1867/68. By World War I, such postal district or zone numbers also existed in various large European cities. They existed in the United States at least as early as the 1920s, possibly implemented at the local post office level only (for example, instances of "Boston 9, Mass" in 1920 are attested) although they were evidently not used throughout all major US cities (implemented USPOD-wide) until World War II.

By 1930 or earlier, the idea of extending the postal district or zone numbering plans beyond large cities to cover even small towns and rural locales had started. These developed into postal codes as they are defined today. The name of US postal codes, "ZIP Codes", reflects this evolutionary growth from a zone plan to a zone improvement plan, "ZIP". Modern postal codes were first introduced in the Ukrainian Soviet Socialist Republic in December 1932, but the system was abandoned in 1939. The next country to introduce postal codes was Germany in 1941, followed by Singapore in 1950, Argentina in 1958, the United States in 1963 and Switzerland in 1964. The United Kingdom began introducing its current system in Norwich in 1959, but it was not used nationwide until 1974.

== Presentation ==
Postal codes by country and digit-type. Numeric digits: 3 4 5 6 7 8 9 10 Alphanumeric digits: 6 7 8 Postal codes not in use:

=== Character sets ===
The characters used in postal codes are:

- The Western Arabic numerals "0" to "9"
- Letters of the ISO basic Latin alphabet
- Spaces, hyphens

==== Reserved and Excluded characters ====
Postal codes in the Netherlands originally did not use the letters 'F', 'I', 'O', 'Q', 'U' and 'Y' for technical reasons. But as almost all existing combinations are now used, these letters were allowed for new locations starting 2005. The letter combinations "SS" (Schutzstaffel), "SD" (Sicherheitsdienst), and "SA" (Sturmabteilung) are not used, due to links with the Nazi occupation in World War II.

Postal codes in Canada do not include the letters D, F, I, O, Q, or U, as the optical character recognition (OCR) equipment used in automated sorting could easily confuse them with other letters and digits. The letters W and Z are used, but are not currently used as the first letter. The Canadian Postal Codes use alternate letters and numbers (with a space after the third character), formatted ANA NAN.

In Ireland, the eircode system uses the following letters only: A, C, D, E, F, H, K, N, P, R, T, V, W, X, Y. This serves to avoid confusion in OCR, and to avoid accidental double-entendres by avoiding the creation of word lookalikes, as Eircode's last four characters are random.

==== Alphanumeric postal codes ====
Most of the postal code systems are numeric; only a few are alphanumeric (i.e., use both letters and digits). Alphanumeric systems can, given the same number of characters, encode many more locations. For example, while a two digit numeric code can represent 100 locations, a two character alphanumeric code using ten digits and twenty letters can represent 900 locations.

The independent nations using alphanumeric postal code systems are:

- Argentina (see table)
- Brunei (see table)
- Canada (see table)
- Eswatini
- Ireland (see table)
- Jamaica (see table) (suspended in 2007)
- Kazakhstan (since 2015)
- Malta (see table)
- Netherlands (see table)
- Peru (see table), the postal code format in Peru was updated in February 2011 to be of the format of five digits.
- Somalia
- United Kingdom (see table)

Countries which prefix their postal codes with a fixed group of letters, indicating a country code, include Andorra, Azerbaijan, Barbados, Ecuador and Saint Vincent and the Grenadines.

=== Country code prefixes ===
ISO 3166-1 alpha-2 country codes were recommended by the European Committee for Standardization as well as the Universal Postal Union to be used in conjunction with postal codes starting in 1994, but they have not become widely used. Andorra, Azerbaijan, Barbados, Ecuador, Latvia and Saint Vincent and the Grenadines use the ISO 3166-1 alpha-2 as a prefix in their postal codes.

In some countries (such as in continental Europe, where a numeric postcode format of four or five digits is commonly used) the numeric postal code is sometimes prefixed with a country code when sending international mail to that country.

=== Placement of the code ===
Postal services have their own formats and placement rules for postal codes. In most English-speaking countries, the postal code forms the last item of the address, following the city or town name, whereas in most continental European countries it precedes the name of the city or town. When it follows the city, it may be on the same line or on a new line.

In Japan, it is written at the start of the address when written in Japanese, but at the end when the address is written in the Latin alphabet.

== Geographic coverage ==
Postal codes are usually assigned to geographical areas. Sometimes codes are assigned to individual addresses or to institutions that receive large volumes of mail, e.g. government agencies or large commercial companies. One example is the French Cedex system.

=== Postal zone numbers ===
Before postal codes as described here were used, large cities were often divided into postal zones or postal districts, usually numbered from 1 upwards within each city. The newer postal code systems often incorporate the old zone numbers, as with London postal district numbers, for example. Ireland still uses postal district numbers in Dublin. In New Zealand, Auckland, Wellington and Christchurch were divided into postal zones, but these fell into disuse, and have now become redundant as a result of a new postcode system being introduced.

=== Codes defined along administrative borders ===
Some postal code systems, like those of Ecuador and Costa Rica, show an exact agreement with the hierarchy of administrative divisions.

Format of six digit numeric (eight digit alphanumeric) postal codes in Ecuador, introduced in December 2007: ECAABBCC

EC – ISO 3166-1 alpha-2 country code
AA – one of the 24 provinces of Ecuador
BB – one of the 226 cantons of Ecuador
CC – one of the parishes of Ecuador.

Format of five digit numeric Postal codes in Costa Rica, introduced in 2007: ABBCC

A – one of the seven provinces of Costa Rica
BB – one of the 81 cantons of Costa Rica
CC – one of the districts of Costa Rica.

In Costa Rica these codes were originally used as district identifiers by the National Institute of Statistics and Census of Costa Rica and the Administrative Territorial Division, and continue to be equivalent.

The first two digits of the postal codes in Turkey correspond to the provinces and each province has assigned only one number. They are the same for them as in ISO 3166-2:TR.

The first two digits of the postal codes in Vietnam indicate a province. Some provinces have one, other have several two digit numbers assigned. The numbers differ from the number used in ISO 3166-2:VN.

=== Codes defined close to administrative boundaries ===
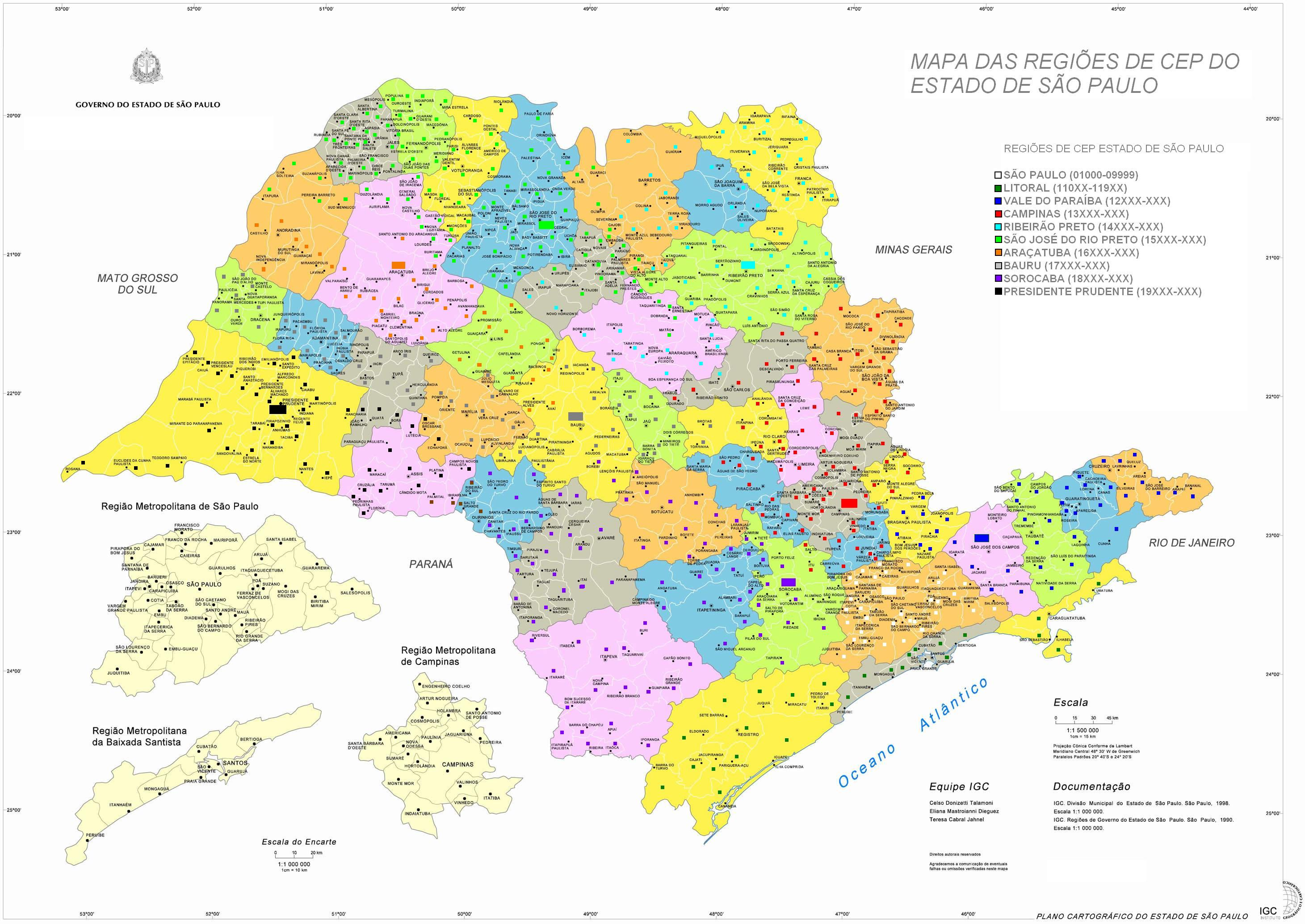
Map of Brazilian five-digit postalcodes of São Paulo state. Each color shows a set of administrative areas, and the hierarchy of codes relating indirectly to them.

In France the numeric code for the departments is used as the first two digits of the postal code, except for the two departments in Corsica that have codes 2A and 2B and use 20 as postal code. Furthermore, the codes are only the codes for the department in charge of delivery of the post, so it can be that a location in one department has a postal code starting with the number of a neighbouring department.

=== Codes defined indirectly to administrative borders ===
The first digit of the postal codes in the United States comprises discrete states. From the first three digits one can infer the state, with a few exceptions where an area is served by a central office in an adjacent state.

Similarly, in Canada, the first letter indicates the province or territory, although the provinces of Quebec and Ontario are divided into several lettered sub-regions (e.g. H for Montreal and Laval), and the Northwest Territories and Nunavut share the letter X.

=== Codes defined independently from administrative areas ===
The first two digits of the postal codes in Germany define areas independently of administrative regions. The coding space of the first digit is fully used (0–9); that of the first two combined is utilized to 89%, i.e. there are 89 postal zones defined. Zone 11 is non-geographic.

Royal Mail designed the postal codes in the United Kingdom mostly for efficient distribution. Nevertheless, people associated codes with certain areas, leading to some people wanting or not wanting to have a certain code. See also postcode lottery.

In Brazil the 8-digit postcodes are an evolution of the five-digit area postal codes. In the 1990s the Brazilian five-digit postal code (illustrated), DDDDD, received a three-digit suffix DDDDD-SSS, but this suffix is not directly related to the administrative district hierarchy. The suffix was created only for logistic reasons.

Brazilian eight-digit postal codes – A city block and its faces

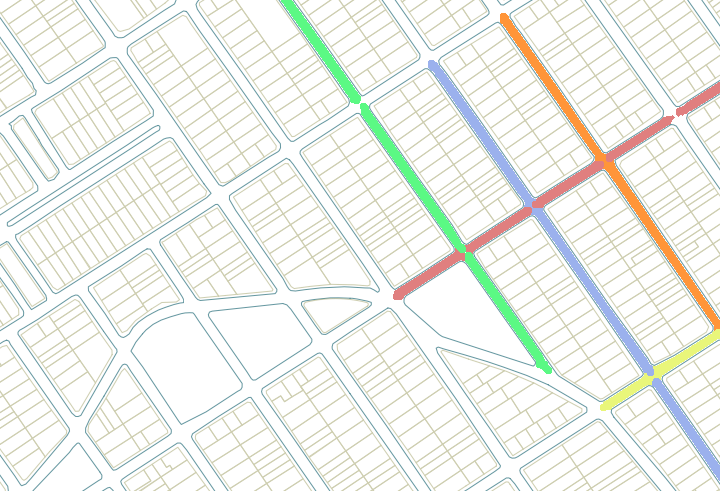
City blocks surrounded by streets, some streets with a different eight-digit postal code (suffixes 001 to 899)

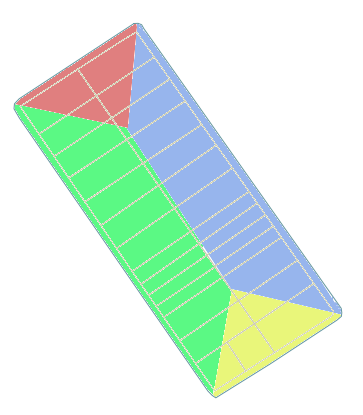
Faces of a city block and their extension into its interior. Each color is an eight-digit postal code, usually assigned to a side (odd or even numbered) of a street.

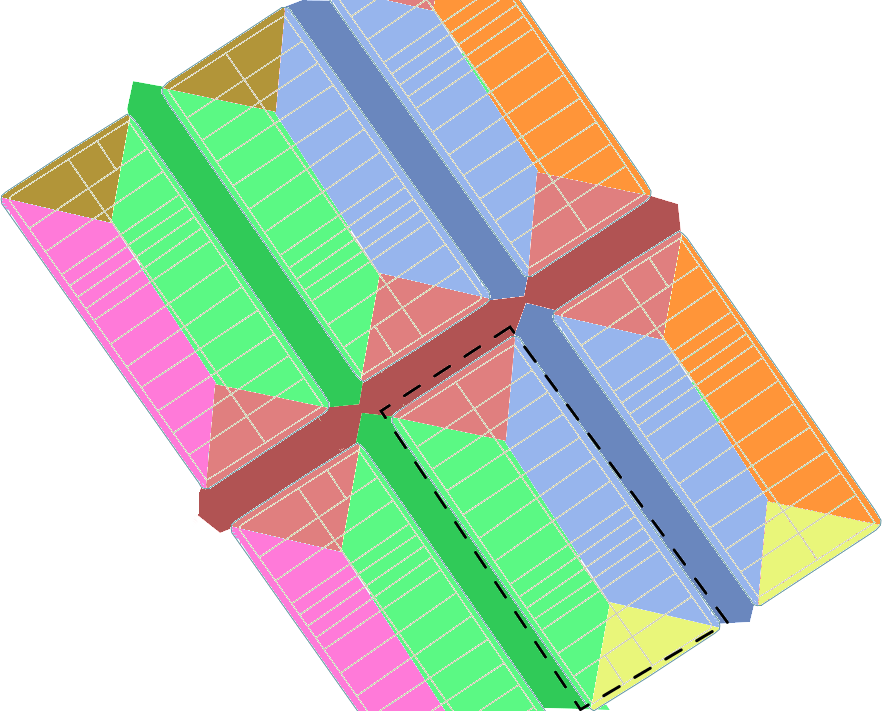
Faces of a city block and their extension between city blocks. The same colors (polygons) indicate the same postal codes.

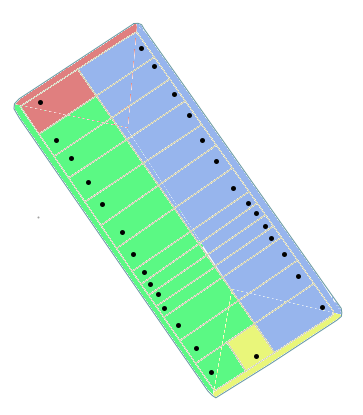
In the code spatialization it is an error to associate the postal code to an individual land lot area: a lot may have 0, 1, 2 or more delivery points, with different codes.

The postal code assignment can be assigned to individual land lots in some special cases – in Brazil, they are named "large receivers" and receive suffixes 900–959. It is an error to associate the postal code with the whole land lot area (illustrated). A postal code is often related to a land lot, but postal codes are usually related to access points on streets. Small or middle-sized houses, in general, only have a single main gate, which is the delivery point. Parks, large businesses such as shopping centers and big houses, may have more than one entrance and more than one delivery point.

=== Precision ===
The number of digits and the alphabet of the digit (decimal with 10 characters or alphanumeric with 36 characters) is proportional to the amount of information; so when used correctly, it provides geographical precision.

It is necessary to establish an important distinction between technological solutions:

- Fine-grained: modern postal code solutions, such as Eircode or DIGIPIN, are alphanumeric codes used as "house door locations". Its geographic entity is a "grid cell", like a Geohash.
- Coarse-grained: the geographic entity associated to classical postal codes can't locate a house door (except in special cases). The typical geographical entity pointed by the code is a city, a neighborhood, an urban block, a street or a block face.

==== Czechoslovakia ====
Czechoslovakia introduced Postal Routing Numbers (PSČ – poštovní směrovací čísla) in 1973. The code consists of 5 digits formatted into two groups: NNN NN. Originally, the first group marked a district transport centre, the second group represented the order of post offices on the collection route. In the first group, the first digit corresponds partly with the region, the second digit meant a collection transport node (sběrný přepravní uzel, SPU) and the third digit a "district transport node" (okresní přepravní uzel). However, processing was later centralized and mechanized while codes remained the same. After separation, Slovakia and the Czech Republic kept the system. Codes with an initial digit of 1, 2, 3, 4, 5, 6, or 7 are used in the Czech Republic, while codes with an initial digit of 8, 9, or 0 are used in Slovakia.

A code corresponds to a local postal office. However, some larger companies or organizations have their own post codes. In 2004–2006, there were some efforts in Slovakia to reform the system, to get separate post codes for every district of single postmen, but the change was not realized.

==== India ====
An example of a Postal Index Number from Kangra in Himachal Pradesh. 4 indicates the West postal zone, 5 indicates a postal sub-zone in Madhya Pradesh, 6 indicates the Ujjain sorting district, 0 indicates the Ujjain core area service route, 01 indicates the Ujjain Head Office as the delivery office.

Postal codes are known as Postal Index Numbers (PINs; sometimes as PIN codes) in India. The PIN system was introduced on 15 August 1972 by India Post. India uses a unique six-digit code as a geographical number to identify locations in India. The format of the PIN is ZSDPPP defined as follows:

Z – Zone
S – Sub-zone
D – Sorting District
P – Service Route
PP – Post Office

The first digit represents nine total zones: eight regional and one functional.

In 2025 the official fine-grained solution, DIGIPIN, was introduced.

==== Ireland ====
In Ireland, the new postal code system, a fine-grained solution launched in 2015, known as Eircode provides a unique 7-character alphanumerical code for each individual address. The first three digits are the routing key, which is a postal district and the last four characters are a unique identifier that relates to an individual address (business, house or apartment). A fully developed API is also available for integrating the Eircode database into business databases and logistics systems.

With a single exception, these codes are in the format:

ANN XXXX

The single exception is the Dublin D6W postal district. It is the only routing key area in the country that takes the format ANA instead of ANN:

D6W XXXX

While it is not intended to replace addresses, in theory simply providing a seven-character Eircode would locate any Irish delivery address. For example, the Irish Parliament Dáil Éireann is: D02 A272

==== Netherlands ====
Postal codes in the Netherlands, known as postcodes, are alphanumeric, consisting of four digits followed by a space and two letters (NNNN AA). Adding the house number to the postcode will identify the address, making the street name and town name redundant. For example: 2597 GV 75 will direct a postal delivery to Theo Mann-Bouwmeesterlaan 75, 's-Gravenhage (the International School of The Hague).

==== Singapore ====
Since 1 September 1995, every building in Singapore has been given a unique, six-digit postal code.

==== United Kingdom ====
For domestic properties, an individual postcode may cover up to 100 properties in contiguous proximity (e.g. a short section of a populous road, or a group of less populous neighbouring roads). The postcode together with the number or name of a property is not always unique, particularly in rural areas. For example, GL20 8NX/1 might refer to either 1 Frampton Cottages or 1 Frampton Farm Cottages, roughly a quarter of a mile (400 metres) apart.

The structure is alphanumeric, with the following six valid formats, as defined by BS 7666:

  AN NAA
 ANA NAA
 ANN NAA
 AAN NAA
AANA NAA
AANN NAA

There are always two halves: the separation between outward and inward postcodes is indicated by one space.

The outward postcode covers a unique area and has two parts which may in total be two, three or four characters in length. A postcode area of one or two letters, followed by one or two digits, followed in some parts of London by a letter.

The outward postcode and the leading numeric of the inward postcode in combination forms a postal sector, and this usually corresponds to a couple of thousand properties.

Larger businesses and isolated properties such as farms may have a unique postcode. Extremely large organisations such as larger government offices or bank headquarters may have multiple postcodes for different departments.

There are 121 postcode areas in the UK, ranging widely in size from BT which covers the whole of Northern Ireland to WC for a small part of Central London. Postcode areas occasionally cross national boundaries, such as SY which covers a large, predominantly rural area from Shrewsbury and Ludlow in Shropshire, England, through to the seaside town of Aberystwyth, Ceredigion on Wales' west coast. There are a number of special purpose postcode areas that are "non-geographic" and which provide special routing instructions (such as parcel returns to online retailers). The three Crown dependencies and Gibraltar also use UK formatted postcodes. Some British Overseas Territories have adopted a single postcode for their territory that is very similar to the UK format.

==== United States ====
In the United States, the basic ZIP Code is composed of five digits. The first three digits identify a specific sectional center facility—or central sorting facility—that serves a geographic region (typically a large part of a state). The next two digits identify a specific post office either serving an area of a city (if in an urban area or large suburban area) or an entire village, town, or small city and its surrounding area (if in a small suburban or rural area).

There is an extended format of the ZIP Code known as the ZIP+4, which contains the basic five-digit ZIP Code, followed by a hyphen and four additional digits. These digits identify a specific delivery route, such as one side of a building, a group of apartments, or several floors of a large office building. Although using the ZIP+4 offers higher accuracy, addressing redundancy, and sorting efficiency within the USPS, it is optional and not widely used by the general public. It is primarily only used by business mailers.

For high volume business mailers using automated mailing machines, the USPS has promulgated the Intelligent Mail barcode standard, which is a barcode containing the ZIP+4 code plus a two digit delivery point. This 11-digit number is theoretically a unique identifier for every address in the country.

=== States and overseas territories sharing a postal code system ===
French overseas departments and territories use the five-digit French postal code system, each code starting with the three-digit department identifier. Monaco is also integrated in the French system and has no system of its own.

The British Crown Dependencies of Guernsey, Jersey and the Isle of Man are part of the UK postcode system. They use the schemes AAN NAA and AANN NAA, in which the first two letters are a unique code (GY, JE and IM respectively). Most of the Overseas Territories have UK-style postcodes, with a single postcode for each territory or dependency, although they are still treated as international destinations by Royal Mail in the UK, and charged at international rather than UK inland rates. The four other Overseas Territories Anguilla, Bermuda, British Virgin Islands and Cayman Islands have their own separate systems and formats.

The Pacific island states of Palau, Marshall Islands and the Federated States of Micronesia remain part of the US ZIP code system, despite having become independent states.

San Marino and the Vatican City are part of the Italian postcode system, while Liechtenstein similarly uses the Swiss system, as do the Italian exclave of Campione d'Italia and the German exclave of Büsingen am Hochrhein, although they also form part of their respective countries' postal code systems.

The Czech Republic and Slovakia still use the codes of the former Czechoslovakia, their ranges not overlapping. In 2004–2006, Slovakia prepared a reform of the system but the plan was postponed and may have been abandoned. In the Czech Republic, there was no significant effort to modify the system.

== Non-geographic codes ==
In the United Kingdom, the non-conforming postal code GIR 0AA was used for the National Girobank until its closure in 2003. A non-geographic series of postcodes, starting with BX, is used by some banks and government departments.

HM Revenue and Customs – VAT Controller
VAT Central Unit
BX5 5AT

The XX postcode is used for parcel returns. The BF postcode is used for British Forces Post Office (BFPO) addresses.

A fictional address is also used by Royal Mail for letters to Santa Claus, more commonly known as Santa or Father Christmas:

Santa's Grotto
Reindeerland XM4 5HQ

Previously, the postcode SAN TA1 was used.

In Finland, the special postal code 96930 is for Korvatunturi, the place where Santa Claus (Joulupukki in Finnish) is said to live, although mail is delivered to the Santa Claus Village in Rovaniemi. The special postal code 99999 was formerly used.

In Canada, the amount of mail sent to Santa Claus increased every Christmas, up to the point that Canada Post decided to start an official Santa Claus letter-response program in 1983. Approximately one million letters come in to Santa Claus each Christmas, including from outside of Canada, and all of them are answered in the same languages in which they are written. Canada Post introduced a special address for mail to Santa Claus, complete with its own postal code:

SANTA CLAUS
NORTH POLE H0H 0H0

In the United States of America, through USPS's Operation Santa, one can "adopt" letters sent by children to Santa Claus, and send gifts back. The USPS's address used for Santa Claus uses the special ZIP code 88888:

Santa
123 Elf Street
North Pole 88888

In Belgium bpost sends a small present to children who have written a letter to Sinterklaas. They can use the non-geographic postal code 0612, which refers to the date Sinterklaas is celebrated (6 December), although a fictional town, street and house number are also used. In Dutch, the address is

Sinterklaas
Spanjestraat 1
0612 Hemel

This translates as "1 Spain Street, 0612 Heaven". In French, the street is called "Paradise Street":

Saint-Nicolas
Rue du Paradis 1
0612 Ciel

== Non-postal uses ==
While postal codes were introduced to expedite the delivery of mail, they can be used for:

- Finding the nearest branch of an organisation to a given address. A computer program uses the postal codes of the target address and the branches to list the closest branches in order of distance. This can be used by companies to inform potential customers where to go, by job centres to find jobs for job-seekers, to alert people of town planning applications in their area, and for other applications.
- Fine-grained postal codes can be used with satellite navigation systems to navigate to an address by street number and postcode.
- Geographical sales territories for representatives in the pharmaceutical industry are allocated based on a workload index that is based upon postcode.
- Population data can be isolated, grouped and/or organized by postal code for statistical analysis.

=== Availability ===
In some countries, the postal authorities charge for access to the code database. As of January 2010, the United Kingdom Government is consulting on whether to waive licensing fees for some geographical data sets (to be determined) related to UK postcodes.

Estimates made between 2013 and 2016 by Open Knowledge Foundation, as part of the Global Open Data Index project, determined that only 15% of countries provided full open data regarding postal codes and addresses.

== See also ==
- List of postal codes
- Category: Lists of postal codes
- Address format by country and area
- Postcode Address File
