= London Post Office Railway rolling stock =

Locomotives used on narrow-gauge railway

The London Post Office Railway (named Mail Rail after 1987) was a 2 ft (610 mm) narrow-gauge, driverless underground railway in London that was built by the Post Office with assistance from the Underground Electric Railways Company of London, to transport mail between sorting offices. It opened in 1927 and operated for 76 years until it closed in 2003. A 1 kilometre (0.62 mi) section of the former railway at Mount Pleasant was opened for passenger use in September 2017 as part of the revamped Postal Museum. The first items of rolling stock were introduced in 1927, but had been replaced by 1930 due to their inferior quality.

== 1927 Stock ==
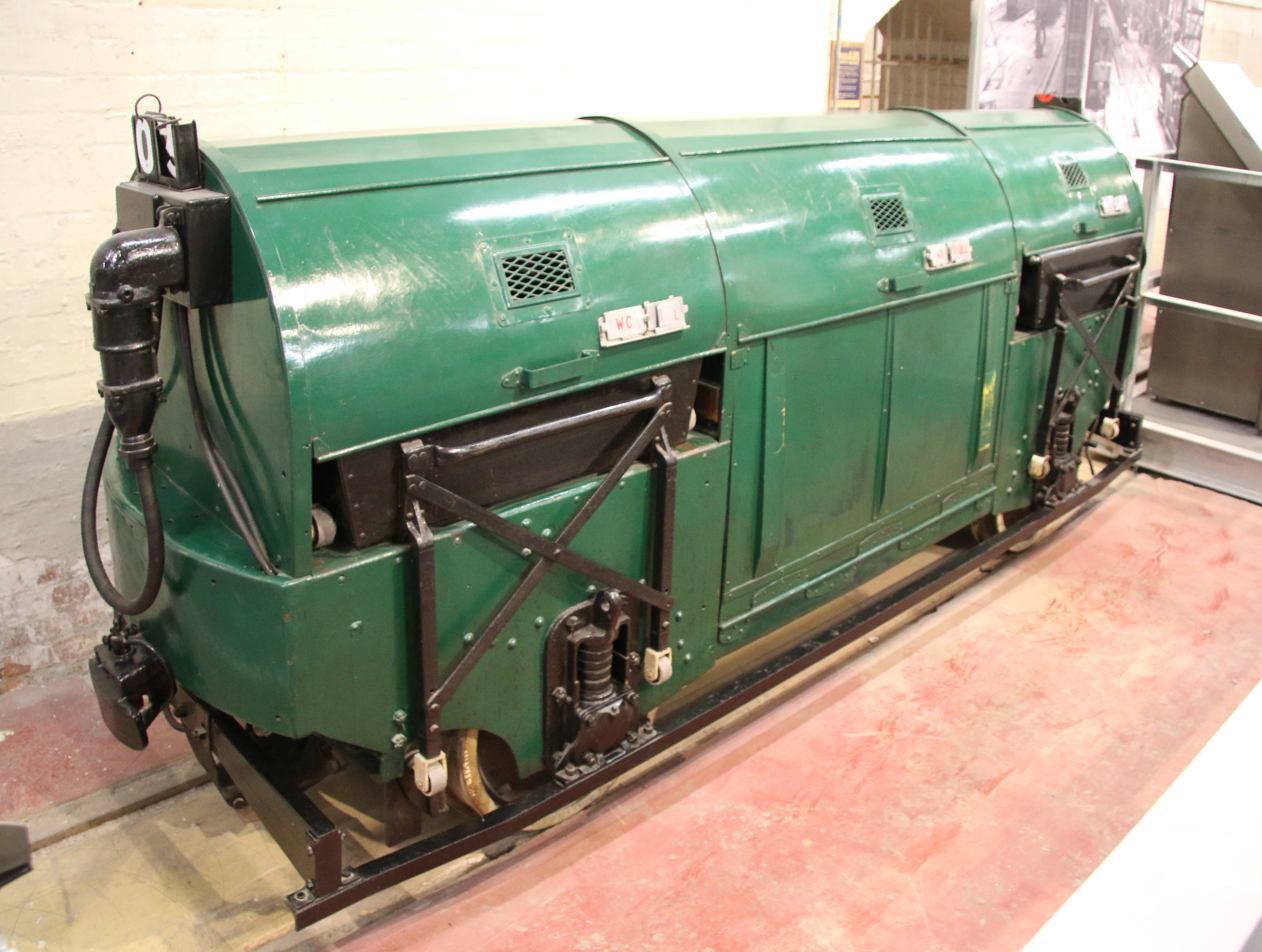
The sole preserved 1927 Stock unit of the London Post Office Railway

The 1927 Stock were twin-axle electric locomotives built in 1927 by British manufacturer English Electric. Ninety of these four-wheeled units were built for the London Post Office Railway system, on which they became the first electric stock to be operated on the underground rail system. Having been built by English Electric throughout 1927 and introduced onto the London Post Office Railways underground network, the 1927 Stock units quickly proved to be overwhelmed by the amount of mail required to be carried on the network.

The 1927 Stock proved to not be very reliable as they suffered from mechanical unreliability and high driving wheel wear, this being due to their fixed wheelbase, while also causing heavy track wear themselves as they had problems with the tight curves on the underground lines. Combined with this was their lack of capacity while moving mail through the capital. Due to these problems they were soon replaced by the 1930 Stock units, of which fifty were built. These new units were articulated and solved many of the problems experienced with the 1927 stock. The first batch of these units also reused the wheels, axles and electrical equipment from the 1927 Stock.

A single 1927 Stock unit, 601, has been preserved by the British Postal Museum and Archive and is on display at the museum in London. The unit was retrieved by the museum from the London Post Office Railways Mount Pleasant workshops in 2011 where after it underwent a process of conservation prior to being put on display.

=== Description ===
In service the 1927 Stock units were numbered 591 to 680 and were coupled together to work in 2-car or 3-car trains. They were twin-axle units and used a 4wRE wheel arrangement while being powered by two traction motors which provided the units with a power output of 22 hp (16 kW). They received their power from a 440 V DC third rail electrification system and travelled on 2 ft (610 mm) gauge track within a custom narrow loading gauge. Each 1927 Stock unit was capable of carrying a single wheeled trolley, in which were housed the mail bags. These trolleys were loaded or unloaded at the various stops along the underground network.

== 1930 and 1936 Stock ==
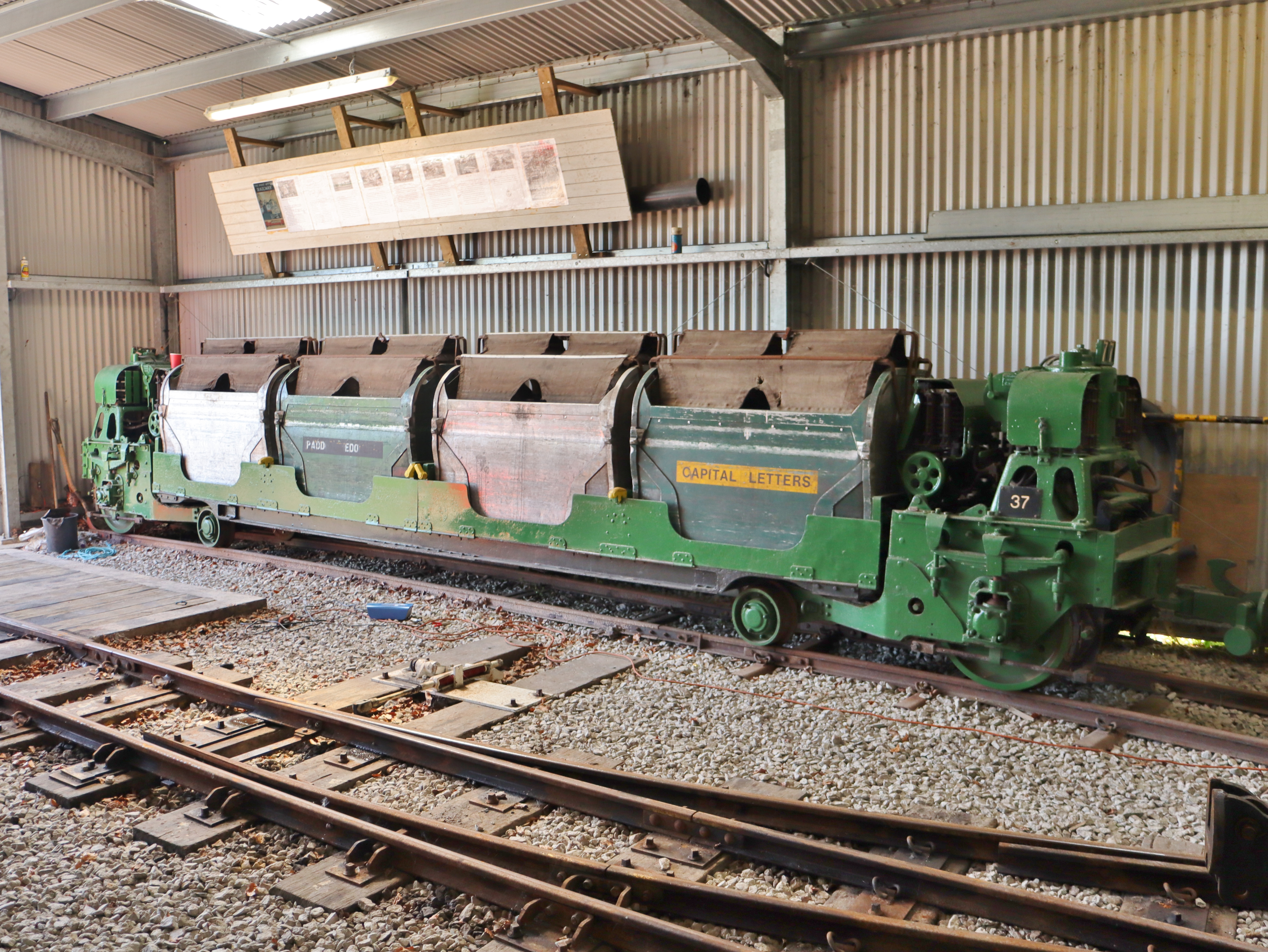
No. 760 of the 1930 Stock, which was then renumbered to 37

The London Post Office Railway 1930 Stock and 1936 Stock were built by English Electric. They were designed to replace the 1927 stock, which were seen as prone to derailments, and were is use from the 1930s until the introduction of the 1980 Stock. An initial 50 units were ordered, being built in two batches from 1930 to 1931. They reused electrical equipment from withdrawn 1927 Stock units. Due to an increase in traffic levels, ten further units were built in 1936.

=== Unit numbering ===
After the introduction of the 1980 Stock, some units were retained, being renumbered into the range 35–51 in 1984. All remaining units were withdrawn in 2003 when the system closed.

1930 Stock (first batch)

1930 Stock (second batch)

1936 Stock

Number(s)
Original	Later
752	—
753	—
754	—
755	35
756	36
757	—
758	—
759	—
760	37
761	38
762	39
763	—

Number(s)
Original	Later
793	—
794	—
795	—
796	—
797	—
798	—
799	—
800	—
801	40
802	—
803	—
804	—
805	41
806	42
807	—
808	—
809	—
810	—
811	43

Number(s)
Original	Later
812	44
813	—
814	45
815	46
816	—
817	—
818	—
819	47
820	—
821	—
822	—
823	—
824	48
825	—
826	—
827	49
828	—
829	—
830	—

Number(s)
Original	Later
923	—
924	—
925	—
926	—
927	—
928	50
929	—
930	—
931	51
932	—

=== Preserved units ===
Several units have been preserved, most of which are from the second batch of 1930 Stock. These are listed below:

- 760 (later 37) – previously on Beeches Light Railway
- 761 (later 38) – Launceston Steam Railway
- 803 – Buckinghamshire Railway Centre
- 806 (later 42) – Launceston Steam Railway
- 807 – Postal Museum Store, Loughton (previously in Science Museum, London collection)
- 808 – Amberley Working Museum
- 809 – Statfold Barn Railway (previously in National Railway Museum, York)

== 1962 Stock ==
The 1962 Stock was a type of prototype rolling stock built by English Electric in 1962. Two units were built as prototypes for a possible new design of stock. Although the new design for which the two units were built wasn't adopted, several of the design features used by the 1962 Stock were later incorporated into the 1980 Stock. The 1962 Stock, like all other stock used on the London Post Office Railway, travels on 2 ft (610 mm) gauge track within a custom loading gauge while being powered via a third rail system using 440 V DC electrification.

Two sets were built, numbered 1 and 2. The first set was withdrawn in 1967 after just five years of service, and was eventually scrapped. The second set lasted until 1980 when it was withdrawn due to damage, however it was later repaired using parts from its scrapped sister and returned to service, with it being renumbered to 66 afterwards. This unit was withdrawn in 2003 when the London Post Office Railway system closed.

== 1980 Stock ==
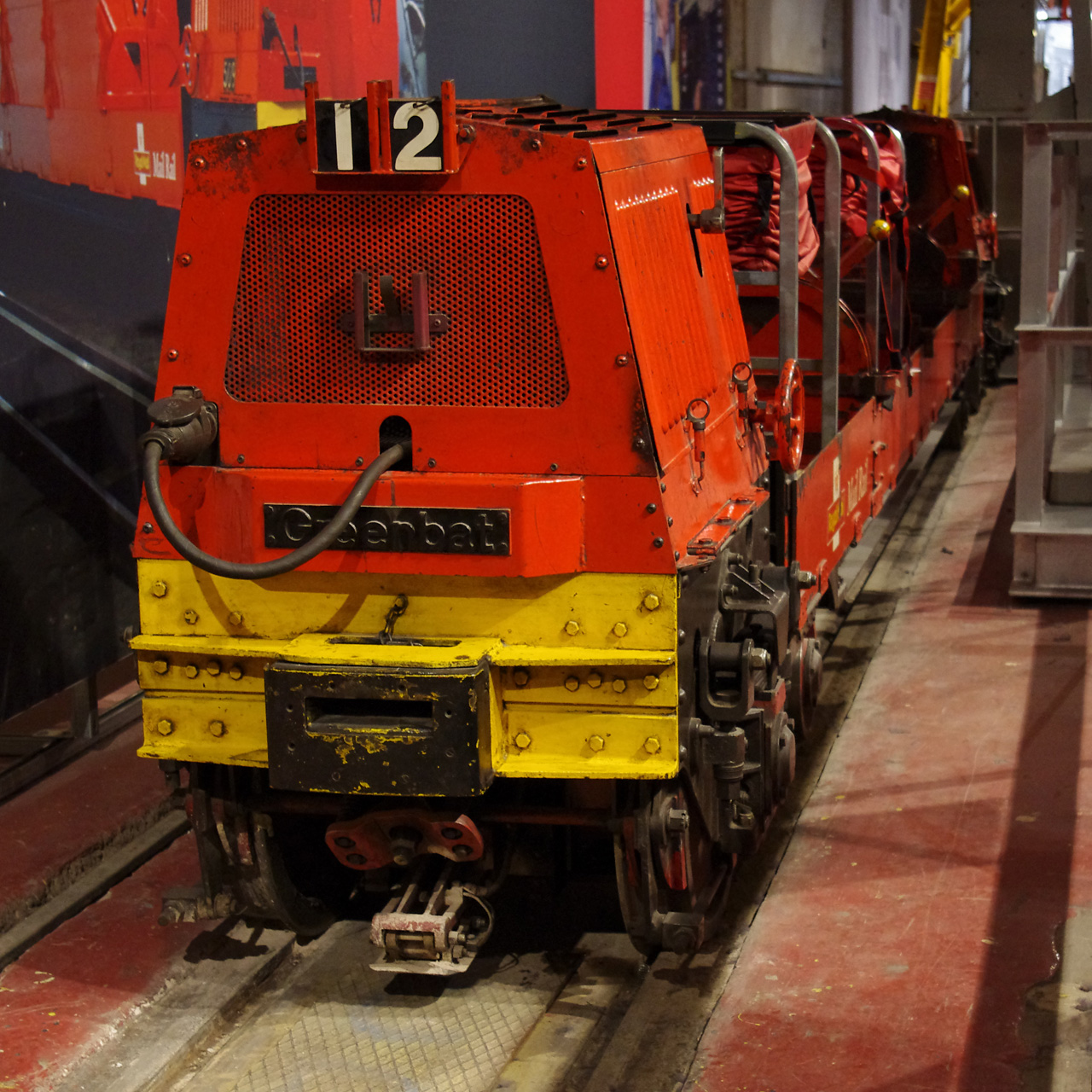
1980 stock seen at the Mail Rail museum

The 1980 Stock was built by Hunslet in Leeds between 1980 and 1982. The units were originally ordered from Greenbat, but the company went into administration after building just three sets. The design incorporated several of the features tested in the prototype 1962 Stock.

Thirty-four of these units were built, primarily to replace the ageing fleet of 1930/1936 Stock, although some of the earlier units were retained. The new sets were originally numbered in the range 501–534, but this was later amended to 1–34 when a new numbering scheme was introduced in 1984. Following the closure of the system in 2003, all units were withdrawn.

== Severn Lamb stock ==
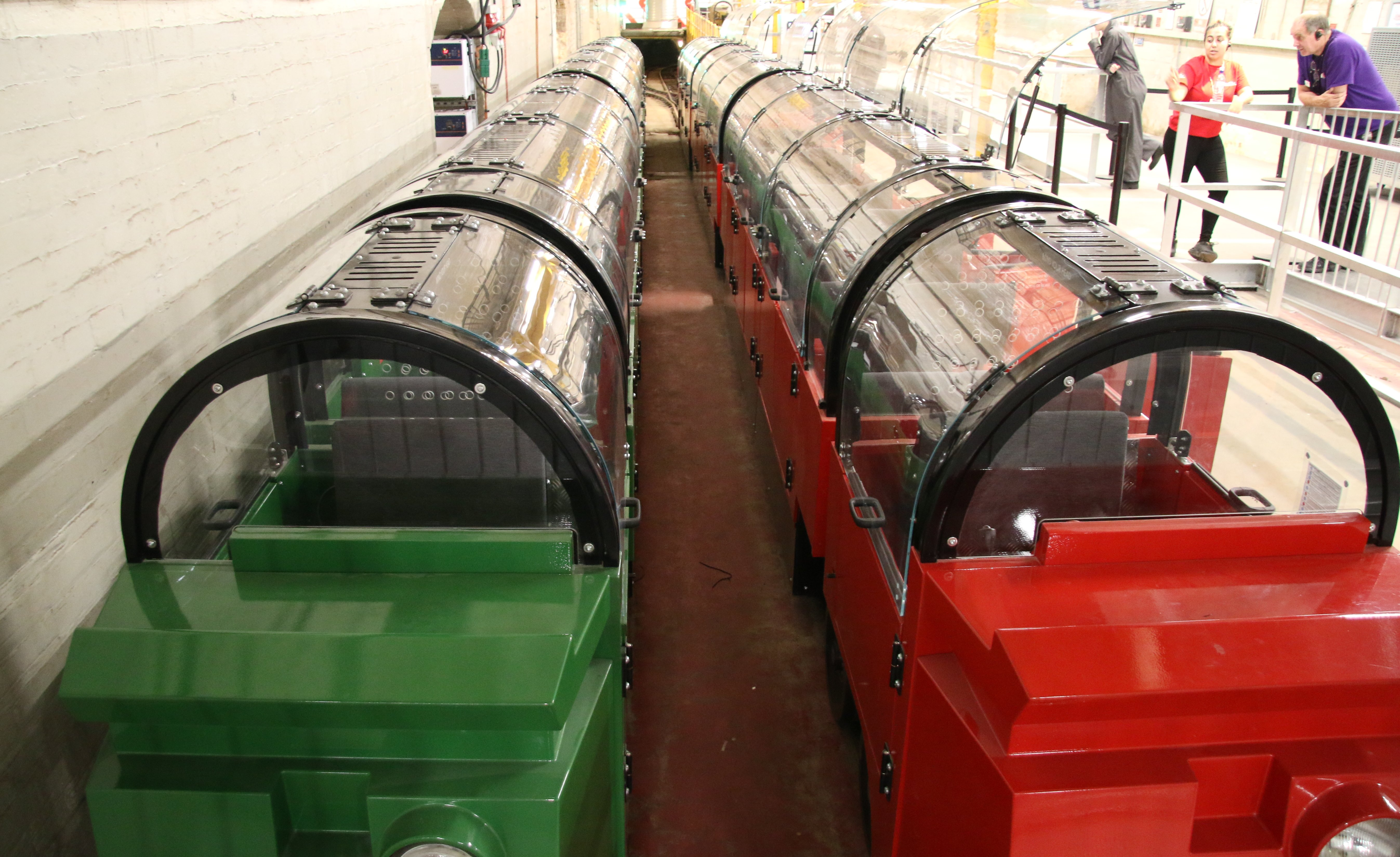
The two trains in the Severn Lamb stock

As part of the opening of the Mail Rail experience at the Postal Museum in London, new trains were contracted for visitors to use to ride on the line. Severn Lamb won the contract and provided two new trains, which were built in Stratford-upon-Avon in 2016 and delivered that November. The trains are battery-powered, with each lasting a day and charging through mains power each night. The new trains require drivers, unlike the original Post Office Railway Stock.
