= London Post Office Railway =

Closed railway system in London

Coordinates: 51.5240°N 0.1126°W

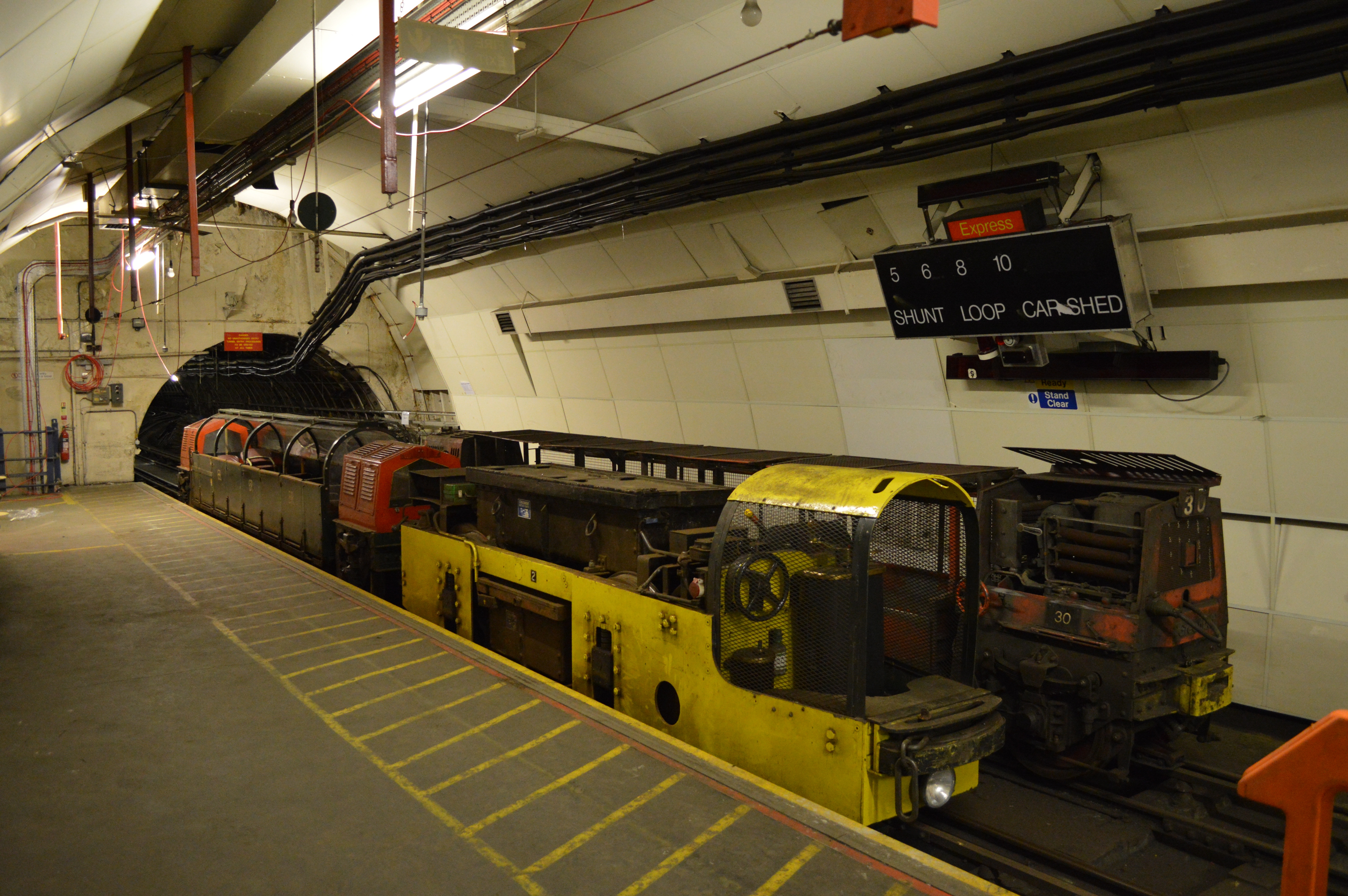
- Mail Rail trains at a platform

Overview
- Status: Closed; partially re-opened as museum
- Owner: Royal Mail
- Locale: London, England
- Termini: Paddington Sorting Office; Whitechapel Eastern Delivery Office
- Stations: 9

Service
- Type: Private industrial railway
- Services: 1
- Depot: Mount Pleasant
- Rolling stock: 1980 Greenwood & Batley

History
- Opened: 3 December 1927
- Closed: 31 May 2003

Technical
- Line length: 6 1/2 mi (10.5 km)
- Track gauge: 2 ft (610 mm)
- Loading gauge: Custom gauge
- Electrification: 440 V DC Third rail
- Operating speed: 40 mph (65 km/h) through core tunnels; 7 mph (11 km/h) through stations, platforms and loops
- Highest elevation: 70 ft (21 m) below street level

The Post Office Railway, known since 1987 as Mail Rail, is a 2 ft (610 mm) narrow-gauge, driverless underground railway in London that was built by the Post Office with assistance from the Underground Electric Railways Company of London, to transport mail between sorting offices. Inspired by the Chicago Tunnel Company, it opened in 1927 and operated for 76 years until it closed in 2003. A one-kilometre (5/8-mile) section of the former railway at Mount Pleasant was opened for passenger use in September 2017 as part of the revamped Postal Museum.

== Geography ==
The line ran from Paddington Head District Sorting Office in the west to the Eastern Head District Sorting Office at Whitechapel in the east, a distance of 6 1/2 miles (10.5 km). It had eight stations, the largest of which was underneath Mount Pleasant, but by 2003 only three stations remained in use because the sorting offices above the other stations had been relocated.

== History ==
=== Use as post office railway ===
Post Office (London) Railway Act 1913
- Act of Parliament
- Parliament of the United Kingdom
- Long title: An Act to enable the Postmaster-General to construct for the purposes of the Post Office certain underground railways and other works in London and for purposes in connexion with such railways.
- Citation: 3 & 4 Geo. 5. c. cxvi

Dates
- Royal assent: 15 August 1913

Text of statute as originally enacted

In 1911, a plan evolved to build an underground railway 6 1/2 miles (10.5 km) long from Paddington to Whitechapel serving the main sorting offices along the route; road traffic congestion was causing unacceptable delays. The plan was approved by the Post Office (London) Railway Act 1913 (3 & 4 Geo. 5. c. cxvi). The contract to build the tunnels was won by John Mowlem and Co. Construction of the tunnels started in February 1915 from a series of shafts. Most of the line was constructed using the Greathead shield system, with limited amounts of hand-mining for connecting tunnels at stations.

The main line has a single 9-foot (2.7 m) diameter tube with two tracks. Just before stations, tunnels diverge into two single-track 7-foot (2.1 m) diameter tunnels leading to two parallel 25-foot (7.6 m) diameter station tunnels. The main tube is at a depth of around 70 feet (21 m). Stations are at a much shallower depth, with a 1-in-20 gradient into the stations. The gradients assist in slowing the trains when approaching stations, and accelerating them away. There is also less distance to lift mail from the stations to the surface. At Oxford Circus the tunnel runs close to the Bakerloo line tunnel of the London Underground. The tunnel also runs under Selfridges as the recent 2018 refurbishment of the building revealed.

Post Office (London) Railway Act 1924
- Act of Parliament
- Parliament of the United Kingdom
- Long title: An Act to extend the time for the completion of works under the Post Office (London) Railway Act 1913.[d]
- Citation: 14 & 15 Geo. 5. c. lxxx

Dates
- Royal assent: 7 August 1924

Text of statute as originally enacted

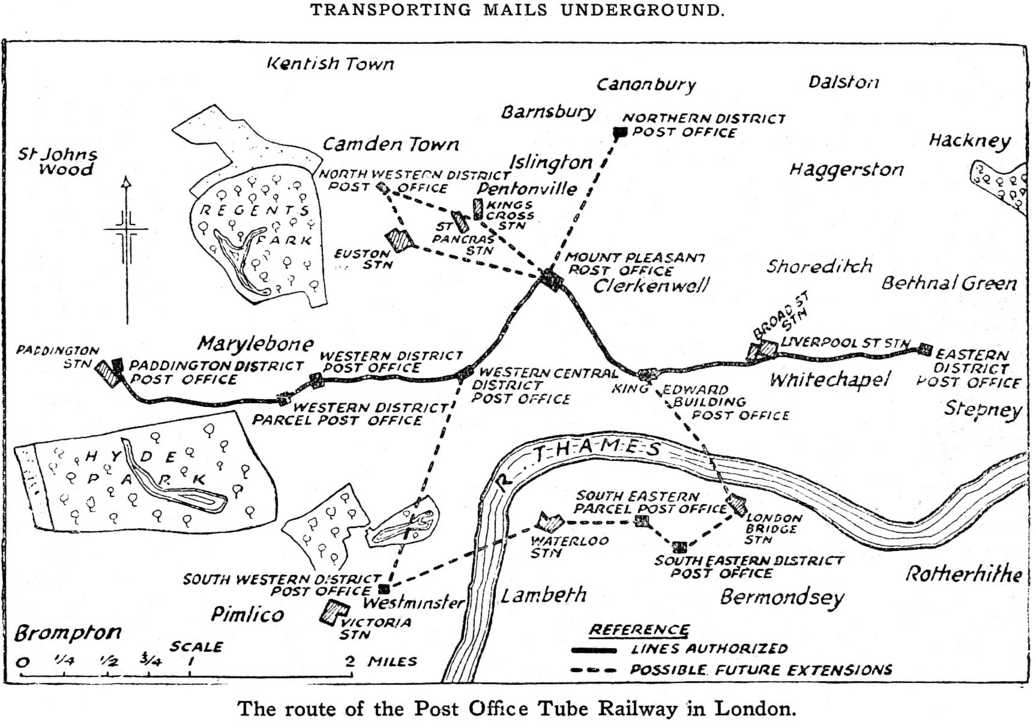
Map of the Post Office Railway

During 1917, work was suspended due to the shortage of labour and materials. By June 1924, track laying had started, and additional time was granted by the Post Office (London) Railway Act 1924 (14 & 15 Geo. 5. c. lxxx). In February 1927, the first section, between Paddington and the West Central District Office, was made available for training. The line became available for the Christmas parcel post in 1927 and letters were carried from February 1928.

In 1954, plans were developed for a new Western District Office at Rathbone Place, which required a diversion, opening in 1958. It was not until 3 August 1965 that the new station and office were opened by the Postmaster General, Tony Benn. The disused section was used as a store tunnel; some parts of it still have the track in place.

In 1987, the railway changed its name to Mail Rail in celebration of its 60th anniversary, and some trains were rebuilt with more aerodynamic casings.

=== Closure ===
A Royal Mail press release in April 2003 said that the railway would be closed and mothballed at the end of May that year. Royal Mail had earlier stated that using the railway was five times more expensive than using road transport for the same task. The Communication Workers Union asserted that the actual figure was closer to three times more expensive but argued that this was the result of a deliberate policy of running the railway down and utilizing it at only one-third of its capacity. A report by the Greater London Authority stated that the "line carries an average of four million letters and parcels per day" and was in support of continued use and criticized the increase of lorries on local roads, estimated to be 80 more truck loads per week. The railway was closed on 31 May 2003.

In April 2011, an urban exploration group called the "Consolidation Crew" published accounts of illicit access to the tunnels. Detailed photography and text revealed that the railway was still largely in good condition, despite some natural decay. Later, media were admitted to the tunnels as part of the pre-launch publicity for the Postal Museum. Photographs showed much of the infrastructure in place.

A team from the University of Cambridge took over a short, double track section of unused Post Office tunnel near Liverpool Street Station, where a newly built tunnel for Crossrail is situated some two metres beneath. The study is to establish how the original cast-iron lining sections, which are similar to those used for many miles of railway under London, resist possible deformation and soil movement caused by the new works. Digital cameras, fibre optic deformation sensors, laser scanners and other low-cost instruments, reporting in real time, have been installed in the vacated tunnel. As well as providing information about the behaviour of the old construction materials, the scheme can also provide an early warning if the new tunnel bores are creating dangerous soil movement.

=== Redevelopment and preservation ===
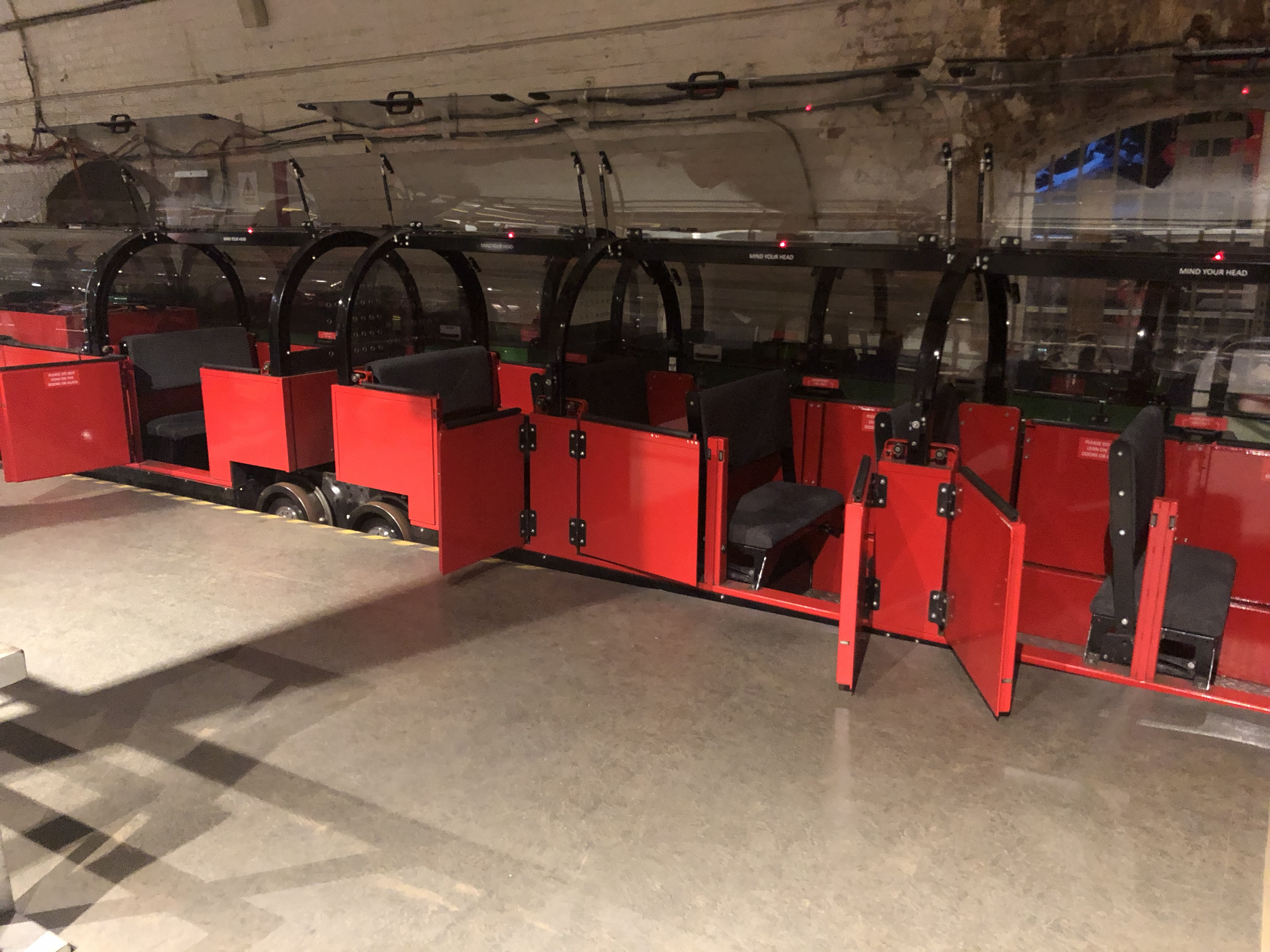
Tour carriages on the Mail Rail at the Postal Museum

In October 2013, the British Postal Museum & Archive announced that it intended opening part of the network to the public. After approval was granted by Islington Council, work on the new museum and the railway began in 2014. Special tourist trains were installed in late 2016. It was planned to open a circular route, running beneath the depot at Mount Pleasant with a journey time of around 15 minutes, by mid-2017. The museum opened on 5 September.

In its first year of operation (2017–2018), the trains performed 9,000 trips totalling 6,213 miles (10,000 km), with the railway and museum hosting over 198,000 visitors.

== Rolling stock ==
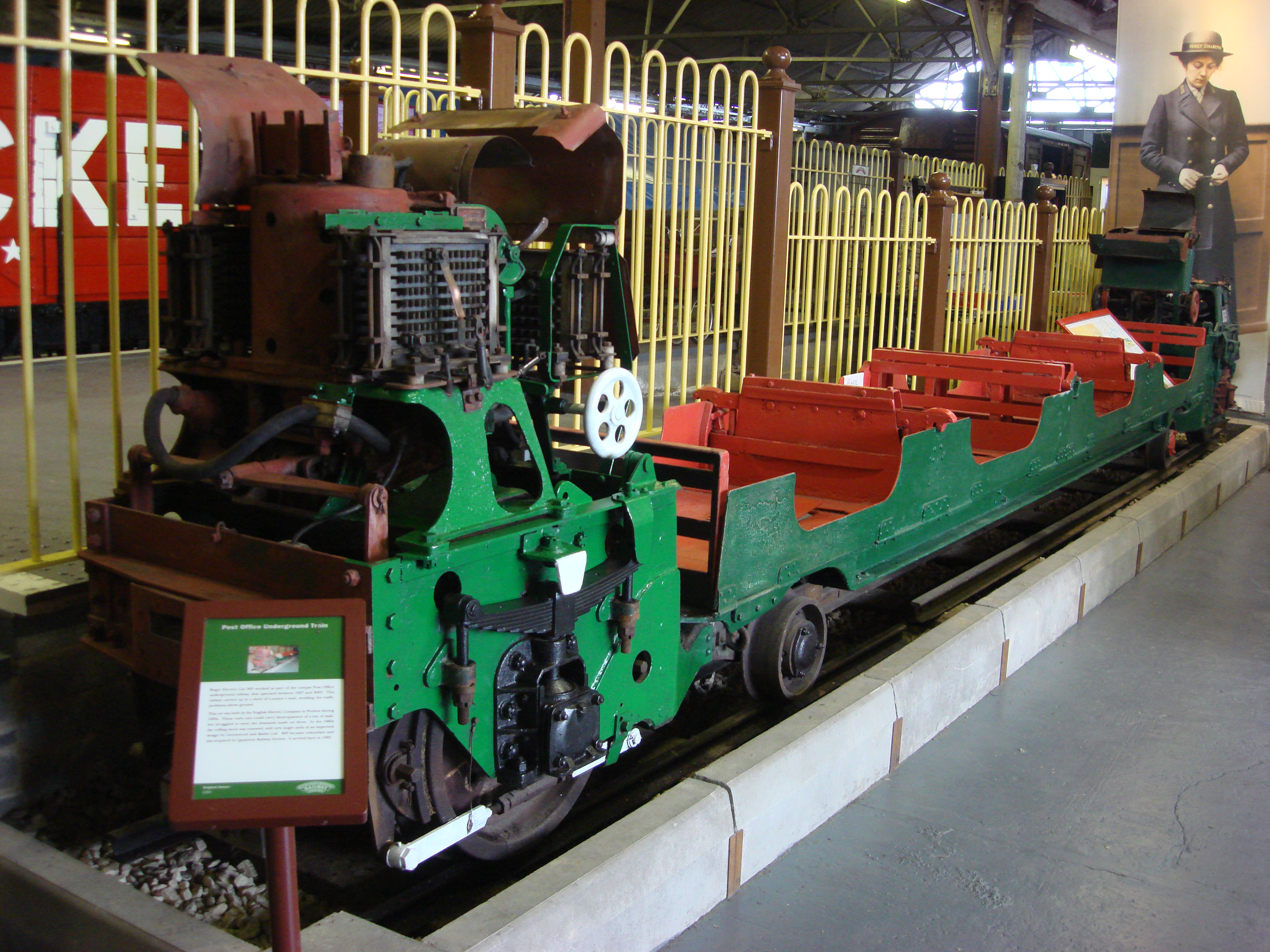
1930 Stock Car No. 803 at the Buckinghamshire Railway Centre

The first stock was delivered in 1926 with the opening of the system. All stock used was electrically powered. The different types of stock in use were:

- 1927 Stock — Original stock
- 1930 & 1936 Stock — Replacement stock for 1927 Stock
- 1962 Stock — Prototype stock
- 1980 Stock — Replacement stock

Some trains have been preserved at the Launceston Steam Railway.

== In fiction ==
- The railway features in the novel The Horn of Mortal Danger by Lawrence Leonard in which there is a connecting tunnel to a secret railway to the North London network. The only other known connection is in the disused tunnel between Highgate and the disused Cranley Gardens.
- A version of the railway is featured in the novel The Great Game by Lavie Tidhar. It takes mail to Buckingham Palace, and is run by the book's featured Simulacra.
- The railway appears in the film Hudson Hawk as 'Poste Vaticane' in the Vatican City. Bruce Willis (as Hawk) stows away in one of the mail containers.
- A mail train system closely based on the railway is in Charlie Higson's third Young Bond book, Double or Die.
- The railway is prominent in Oliver Harris's 2014 book Deep Shelter.
- The railway features in Mark Leggatt's 2016 novel The London Cage, as a means for Connor Montrose to move about London. The international thriller, a follow-up to Names of the Dead, was published by Scottish-based publisher Fledgling Press in June 2016.
- The railway makes an appearance in Adrian Tchaikovsky's 2020 novel The Doors of Eden as Khan and Lee are being led by Stig towards a door to escape from pursuit by Rove's henchmen.

== In film ==
The railway was used for various films and television programmes, and details are given at the Postal Museum.

== Similar railways ==
A pneumatic underground railway was used by the Post Office in London between 1863 and 1874 using individual wheeled capsules, operated by the London Pneumatic Despatch Company.

In 1910, a 450-metre (1,480 ft) tunnel railway opened in Munich, Germany between München Hauptbahnhof and the nearby Post office. The tunnels were damaged in World War II, restored in 1948 and partially rebuilt in 1966 to allow for the first Munich S-Bahn tunnel. Operations ceased in 1988.

Postal Telegraph and Telephone (Switzerland) opened the 340-metre (1,120 ft) Post-U-Bahn (underground railway) in Zürich in 1938. It ran between Zürich Hauptbahnhof and the Sihlpost, Zürich's main post office. The track gauge was 60 cm, and the small electric railcar, which could carry 250 kg of mail, collected power from wires between the tracks. Operations ceased on 11 October 1980 when a rubber-tired system replaced the train.

The Chicago Tunnel Company, in operation between 1906 and 1959, delivered freight, parcels, and coal, and disposed of ash and excavation debris. It operated an elaborate network of 2 ft (610 mm) narrow-gauge track in 7 ft 6 in × 6 ft 0 in (2.3 m × 1.8 m) tunnels running under the streets throughout the central business district including and surrounding the "Loop".

== See also ==
- Subterranean London
- List of British heritage and private railways
- Travelling Post Office
- London Underground
- Royal Mail
- British Rail Class 325, a train operated by Royal Mail for carrying bulk mail.
