= Greenwood & Batley =

British manufacturing company

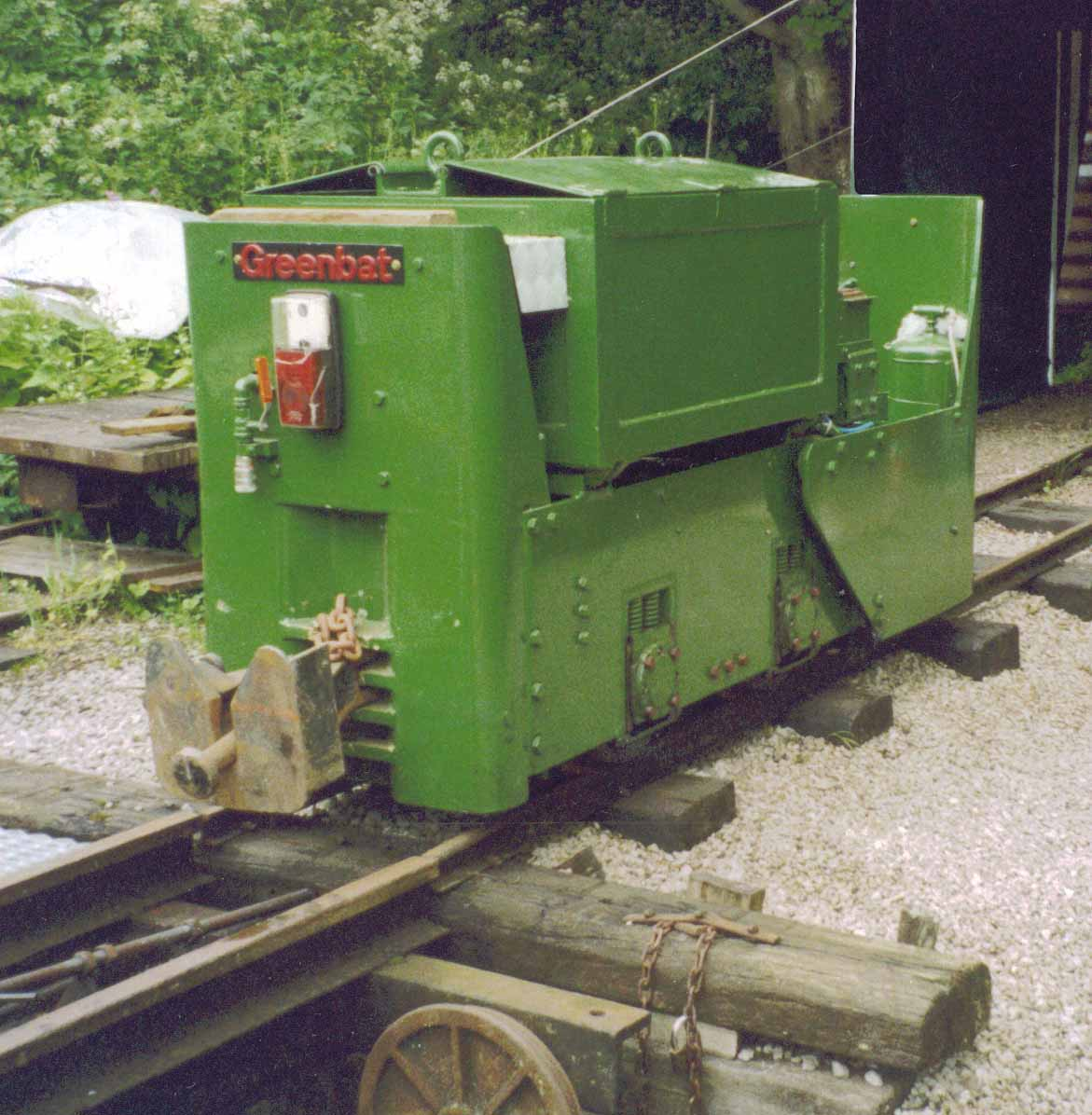
Greenbat battery-electric locomotive 6061 (built 1961) at Steeple Grange Light Railway

Greenwood & Batley were a large engineering manufacturer with a wide range of products, including armaments, electrical engineering, and printing and milling machinery. They also produced a range of battery-electric railway locomotives under the brand name Greenbat. The works was in Armley, Leeds, UK.

== Introduction ==
Thomas Greenwood and John Batley first set up their business in 1856, both having previously worked at Fairburn's Wellington Foundry in Leeds. Their first premises, the Albion Foundry, was taken over from Thomas W. Lord. The foundry was located on East Street by the River Aire (Aire & Calder Navigation), however this quickly became too small for their needs and in 1859 they constructed the Albion Works in Armley Road, Leeds. In 1885 the company branched out into Flour and Oil Milling Machinery as a result of the acquisition of the business of Joseph Whitham, Perseverance Iron Works, Kirkstall Road, Leeds. By 1888 the works covered 11 acres (4.5 ha) and employed around 1600 men. A rail connection with the Great Northern Railway was installed in 1890 to bring in raw materials and to deliver finished products. Greenwood & Batley rapidly became a giant of a company, manufacturing an incredible range of products. Their primary business was military equipment both in terms of machinery to make armaments and the production of components such as bullets and shell cases. They also produced some of the first tanks in the First World War.

An early innovation was the installation of their own electricity generating station, completed in 1894. This allowed machine tools to be electrically driven rather than the traditional common shafts driven by steam. This development was to prove profitable in other ways, as the company was able to provide similar generator stations for both public supplies and industrial applications e.g. tramways, as one of its range of products.

A further acquisition in 1896 saw Greenwood & Batley take over Smith, Beacock & Tannett, Victoria Foundry, Water Lane, Leeds. This company were the successors to the Murray Round Foundry and were principally involved in the manufacture of Machine Tools.

The company became part of the Fairbairn-Lawson Group in the late 1960s; however, trading conditions were not favourable, and in April 1980 the receivers were called in and 480 employees made redundant. The company was bought by Hunslet Holdings for £1.65M who continued to use the Greenbat name for their battery locomotives. By 1984 the work had been transferred to Jack Lane and the Albion Works were mothballed. In 1987 the site was sold and the works demolished.

== Products ==
At the start of the twentieth century Greenwood & Batley offered the following products:-

=== Machine tool department ===
Every description of General and Special machine [tools] for Railway, Marine and General Engineers, including Hydraulic and other Forging and Stamping Machinery, Lathes, Punching, Shearing, Planing, Milling, Shaping, Drilling and Boring Machines. Bolt, Nut and Screw Machinery. Testing Machines for strength of Material. Wood Working Machinery. This YouTube video shows old Greenwood and Batley screw machines still in use in Pakistan:

=== Special plants and machinery ===
For making Armour Plates, Ordnance, Gun Mountings and Ammunition: also for Small Arms Cartridges, Gunpowder, &c., and every description of War Material. Rolling Mills for Metal Coining, Presses and Minting Machinery.

=== Oil mill machinery department ===
The "Albion," "Leeds, " and Anglo-American systems for Extraction of every kind of Vegetable Oil including Machinery for Preparing and Decorticating Seeds, Nuts &c. Presses for making Cattle Feeding Cakes, Seed and Grain Elevators and Warehousing machinery. Oil Refineries. Cotton and other Baling Presses.

=== Textile machinery department ===
Improved Patented Machines for Preparing and Spinning Waste Silk, China Grass, Rhea, Ramie, and other fibres. Whyte's patent Cop Winding Machine.

Spinning Waste Silk machine was exported to Japan around 1913, and it is certified to Mechanical Engineering Heritage (Japan) No. 130, in 2025.

=== Engineering department ===
Frickart's Improved Corliss Steam Engines, single compound and triple expansion of the largest powers, for driving Factories, Mills, Electrical Installations, &c. Sole Manufacturers of The Brayton Patent Oil Engine.

=== Electrical department ===
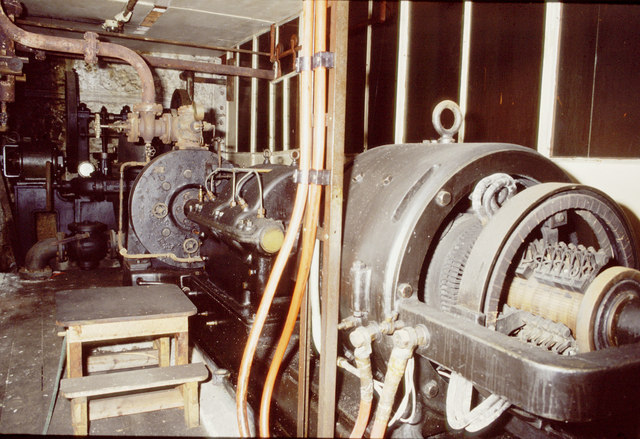
DC generating plant of De Laval impulse turbine, reduction gearbox and DC dynamo, installed at Bamford Mill

all kinds of Dynamos and Motors for Lighting or Transmission of Power. Speciality: Motors for electrically driven Machine Tools &c. De Laval's Patent Steam Turbine Motors, Turbine Dynamos, Turbine Pumps and Fans (for Great Britain and Colonies, China and Japan).

=== Ordnance department ===
Manufacturers of all kinds of Military Small Arms Ammunition e.g. .303 British. Self-propelling Torpedoes (Whitehead's) for the Navy, and Horse Shoes for the British Government.

=== Printing and sewing machine department ===
Patent Platen Printing Machines. Patent Boot Sewing Machines. Cloth Cutting Machines. Patent Boot Sewing Machines. Cloth Cutting Machines for Wholesale Clothiers, &c.

=== Locomotive and tram building ===
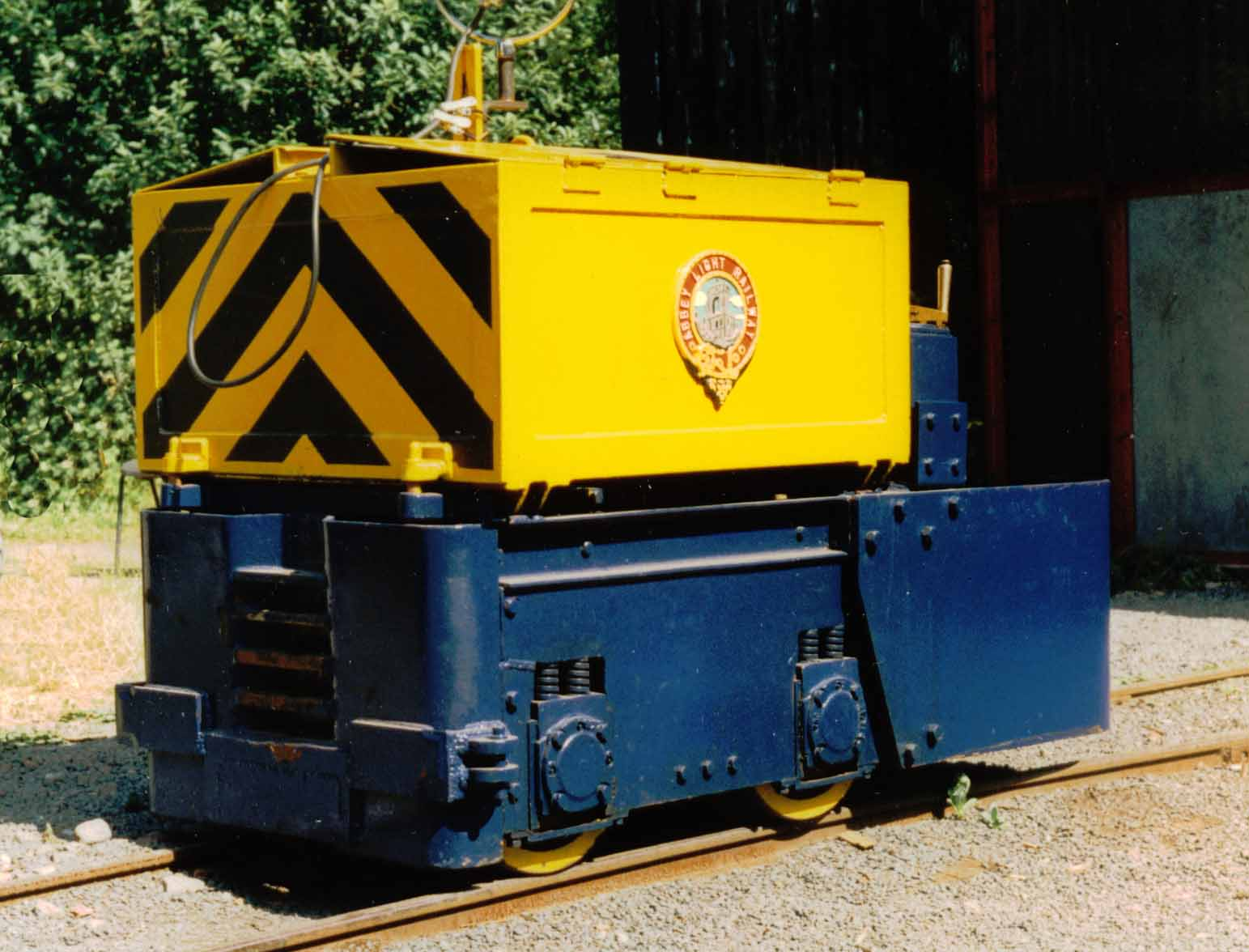
Greenwood & Batley 2848 built 1957, now preserved at Ripon & District Light Railway

Greenbat was the trade name for the railway locomotives built by Greenwood & Batley. The company specialised in electric locomotives, particularly battery-powered types for use in mines and other hazardous environments.

In 1876 the company built an experimental compressed air tramcar. The vehicle was supplied by a 100-cubic-foot (2,800 L) reservoir filled at 1000psi. Similarly, in 1878 a Loftus Perkins tramway locomotive was built, fed by a water-tube boiler nominally rated at 500psi.

Leeds Corporation placed an order for 25 electric tramcars in 1896, and the vehicles entered service in 1897, but there were no repeat orders.

Greenwood & Batley's first successful venture into locomotive building occurred in July 1927, when five 4 hp (3.0 kW) battery-electric narrow gauge locomotives were completed for Edmund Nuttall's Mersey Tunnel contract. These locomotives proved very reliable and a total of 31 G&B locomotives were used on the Mersey Tunnel construction. Other work developed rapidly. In 1928, flameproof locomotive were built for the Royal Navy and in 1929 the first export order was for seven, pantograph fitted locomotives for the Chinese Engineering and Mining Co Ltd.

In 1930 the first standard gauge locomotive was built for Luton Power Station. This was a 15 hp (11 kW) design and was capable of hauling one hundred tons at 4 mph (6.4 km/h) on the level. This locomotive is preserved at the Armley Mills Industrial Museum, Leeds. A standard gauge passenger-carrying vehicle was constructed in 1933 for use by the Royal Navy at Gosport. This locomotive used two 10 hp (7.5 kW) motors and could run at 20 mph (32 km/h) up a 1 in 137 gradient. Other products for which they were well known was coke car locomotive for Gas Works and Coking Plants.

Greenwood & Batley also made a number of Coke oven locomotives. These strange-looking machines were made to go very slowly for long periods, and had to be extremely reliable. One is at the Middleton Railway in Leeds.

One of the last orders was the London Post Office Railway 1980 Stock.

In their short period of production, Greenwood & Batley built 1367 electric locomotives which were exported around the world.

==== Battery electric flat trucks ====
Another successful product line were the battery-electric factory flat trucks, small vehicles designed for transporting goods inside factories, where the exhaust fumes of an internal combustion engine could not be tolerated. The truck consisted of a flat load bed, with a battery box and wheels underneath. One set of wheels was driven, and the other steered, with the motor positioned between them. The prop-shaft went down the middle of the two battery boxes to the driven wheels. At the steered end was a driver's platform, with a steering tiller (like a narrowboat) and controller, with foot pedal operating brake and on/off switch. A 3/4 ton example can be found on the Embsay and Bolton Abbey Railway.

== Today ==
Today there is no tangible evidence of this establishment except occasional surviving artifacts such as machinery made at the Albion Works that can be found on the secondhand market. The only local reminder of the Albion Works is the name of the public house "The Albion" which must have served many a pint to thirsty workers.

=== Notable surviving examples ===
- The Steeple Grange Light Railway's main locomotive is GB No 6061, which worked at a number of steel mills. This loco was built from an adapted design, which had a cab that ran in on rollers. However, this was requested to be left off. She has one 5HP motor, a three notch controller and a 24 cell, 48 volt battery, and was saved and first restored by Adrian Booth. Mr Booth who has written a book on Greenwood & Batley, which is very interesting but sadly out of print. The SGLR also owns Ladywash mine No.6, GB No 2493. This loco was built in 1953, and is a standard 3 ton, 10HP design, albeit much modified by Ladywash throughout her career. Spending all her life at Ladywash, she was the first locomotive to be bought by the SGLR. However, due to a lifetime of heavy abuse, the controller being removed and the cost of new batteries nothing was done to her. She was bought by a member, who eventually sold her to another member, who is currently restoring her. She is now off site, with the frame being shotblasted to remove about 20 years rust.
- Leeds Industrial Museum has two Greenbats, both of which also worked at Ladywash. GB Nos 1925 and 1926, Ladywash Nos 4 and 5, were bought by the museum when the mine shut. According to Adrian Booth's book, No 4 was in bits, and a picture of No 5 shows this loco was modified in a similar way to No 6 (frame and cab extensions, new controller). These locos were 4.5 HP, probably a forerunner of 6061 (see above). A picture showing what appears to be the back of No 5 (in front of the sheeted up traction engine) can be found here. All these locomotives are 18" gauge.
- A 6HP Greenbat can be found at the Peak District Mining Museum in Matlock Bath. This one appears to be complete, and in very good condition but unrestored. She is underground in their Temple Mine display, and looks like she won't go for a long time, if at all, having a big ramp preventing any easy extraction. This one is unusually 17" gauge, and worked at Long Rake Spar Mine until its recovery in early 1982.
- Another Greenbat can be found at the West Lancashire Light Railway. Built in 1942, this one worked at RAF Fauld in Staffordshire. The WLLR stock list is here, and clicking on the loco shows it as it is now, fully restored and looking lovely.
- The Almond Valley Light Railway has No 1698.
- The Ravenglass and Eskdale Railway in Cumbria has the once 16" gauge No. 2872, built in 1957 for Thomas Marshall & Co. of Storrs Bridge Fireclay Mine in Yorkshire. Formerly used as a carriage shunter, it now awaits refurbishment and a new battery.
- Greenwood & Batley also made some standard gauge battery and overhead shunters, a similar-looking industrial shunter survives at the Ribble Steam Railway, who are cosmetically restoring her.
- A 1,000,000 lbf hydraulic Universal Testing Machine, designed by and built for David Kirkaldy and installed in his Southwark workshop, now the Kirkaldy Testing Museum, where it is maintained in operating condition and demonstrated for visitors.

== Bibliography ==
- Booth, A.J. (1986). Greenwood & Batley Locomotives 1927–1980. Industrial Railway Society. ISBN 0-901096-52-0.
- Floud, Roderick C. (2006) [1976]. The British Machine Tool Industry, 1850-1914. Cambridge, England: Cambridge University Press. ISBN 978-0-521-02555-3. LCCN 2006275684. OCLC 70251252.. Chapters 5 through 7 of Floud 2006/1976 study Greenwood & Batley in detail.
