= Kirkaldy Testing Museum =

Museum in Southwark, England

Coordinates: 51°30′21.47″N 0°6′5.58″W

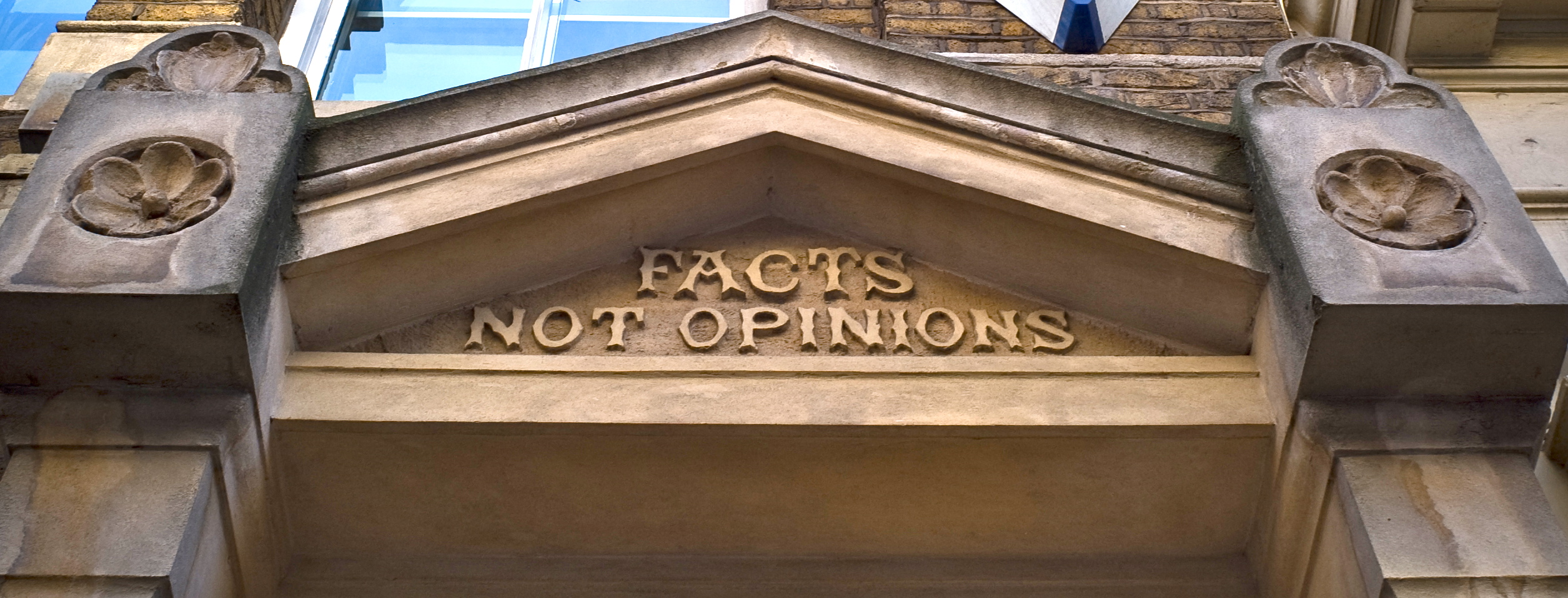

- Location within Central London
- Established: 1983; 43 years ago
- Location: Southwark; London, SE1; United Kingdom
- Public transit access: Southwark; Waterloo East
- Website: testingmuseum.org.uk

Listed Building – Grade II*
- Official name: Kirkaldy's testing works and testing machine
- Designated: 13 May 1971
- Reference no.: 1385928

The Kirkaldy Testing Museum is a museum in Southwark, south London, England, in David Kirkaldy's former testing works. It houses Kirkaldy's large so-called universal testing machine (tensometer), and many smaller more modern machines (including a Brinell durometer). It is open on the first Sunday of each month.

The building at 99 Southwark Street became a listed building in 1971, and was promoted to Grade II* in June 2014.

== Background ==
Kirkaldy was born in Dundee in 1820, and educated at Edinburgh University. He worked at Napier shipbuilding works from 1843, where he became Chief Draughtsman and Calculator. He left in 1861 and over the next two and a half years studied existing mechanical testing methods and designed his own testing machine. William Fairbairn had pioneered tensile strength measurement as well as assessing creep and fatigue on large structures as well as small.

Entirely at his own expense, Kirkaldy commissioned his machine from the Leeds firm of Greenwood & Batley, closely supervising its production. Aggrieved over the slow rate of manufacture, after 15 months he had the machine delivered to Southwark still unfinished, in September 1865.

== Universal Testing Machine ==
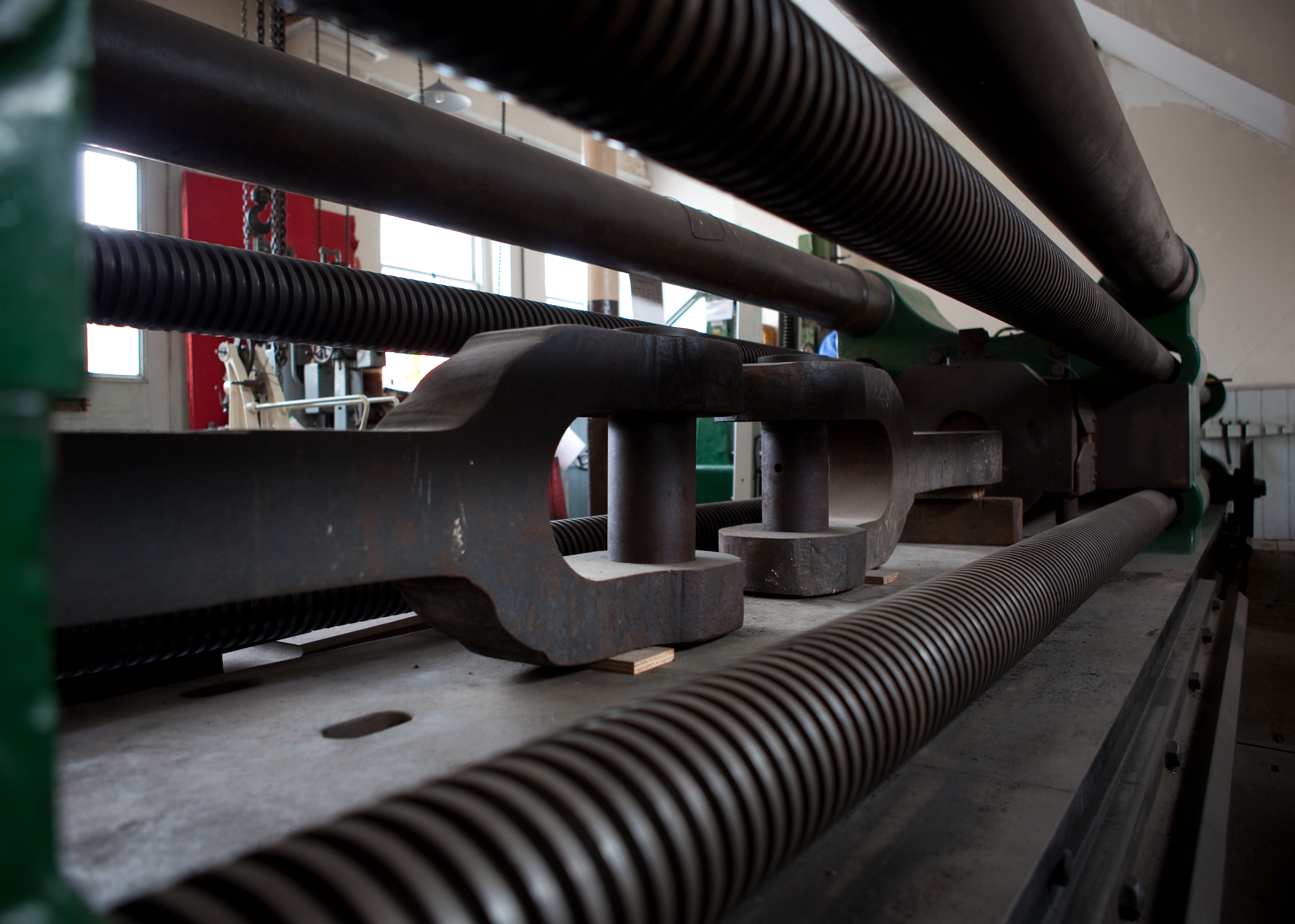
Kirkaldy's testing machine.

The testing machine is 47 feet 7 inches (14.50 m) long and weighs some 116 long tons (118 t). It works horizontally, the load applied by a hydraulic cylinder and ram. The working fluid is water not oil. The load is measured by a weighing system consisting of a number of levers with the final one carrying a jockey weight. The operator lets water into the hydraulic cylinder and as the pressure and hence load on the test piece increases the jockey weight is wound along to balance the hydraulic load. As it is wound it moves along a graduated scale and when the object under test fails the number on this scale is noted and multiplied by the weight to give the failure load.

The weight can be varied in increments of 50 pounds (23 kg) using slotted plates on a hanger. On the lower scale this reads up to 150 pounds (68 kg), and up to 1,000 pounds (450 kg) can be put onto the hanger. A separate jockey weight system above this one allowed the machine to measure loads of up to 1,000,000 pounds (450 t).

The machine is kept in working order at the Kirkaldy Museum in Southwark. Problems can occur with the gasket which seals the single hydraulic cylinder. The gasket is in the original material, leather, rather than a more modern material. Originally the London Hydraulic Power Company supplied the high-pressure water, but now the museum uses an electric pump. When breaking specimens for visitor demonstrations a load not exceeding 20 long tons (20 t) is used.

Kirkaldy also developed methods for examining the microstructure of metals using optical microscopy. It involved cutting sections, polishing the sections and then etching to reveal different constituents.

== Notable tests ==
The Kirkaldy works also tested components for the Eads Bridge across the Mississippi River in St. Louis, USA, which was completed in 1874, for Hammersmith Bridge (1887), the old Wembley Stadium (1923), and for the Skylon that was built for the nearby Festival of Britain in 1951. It also helped accident analysis by testing materials from structures that failed, including the Tay Bridge Disaster of 1879 and the BOAC Flight 781 De Havilland Comet crash of 1954.

=== Tay bridge disaster ===
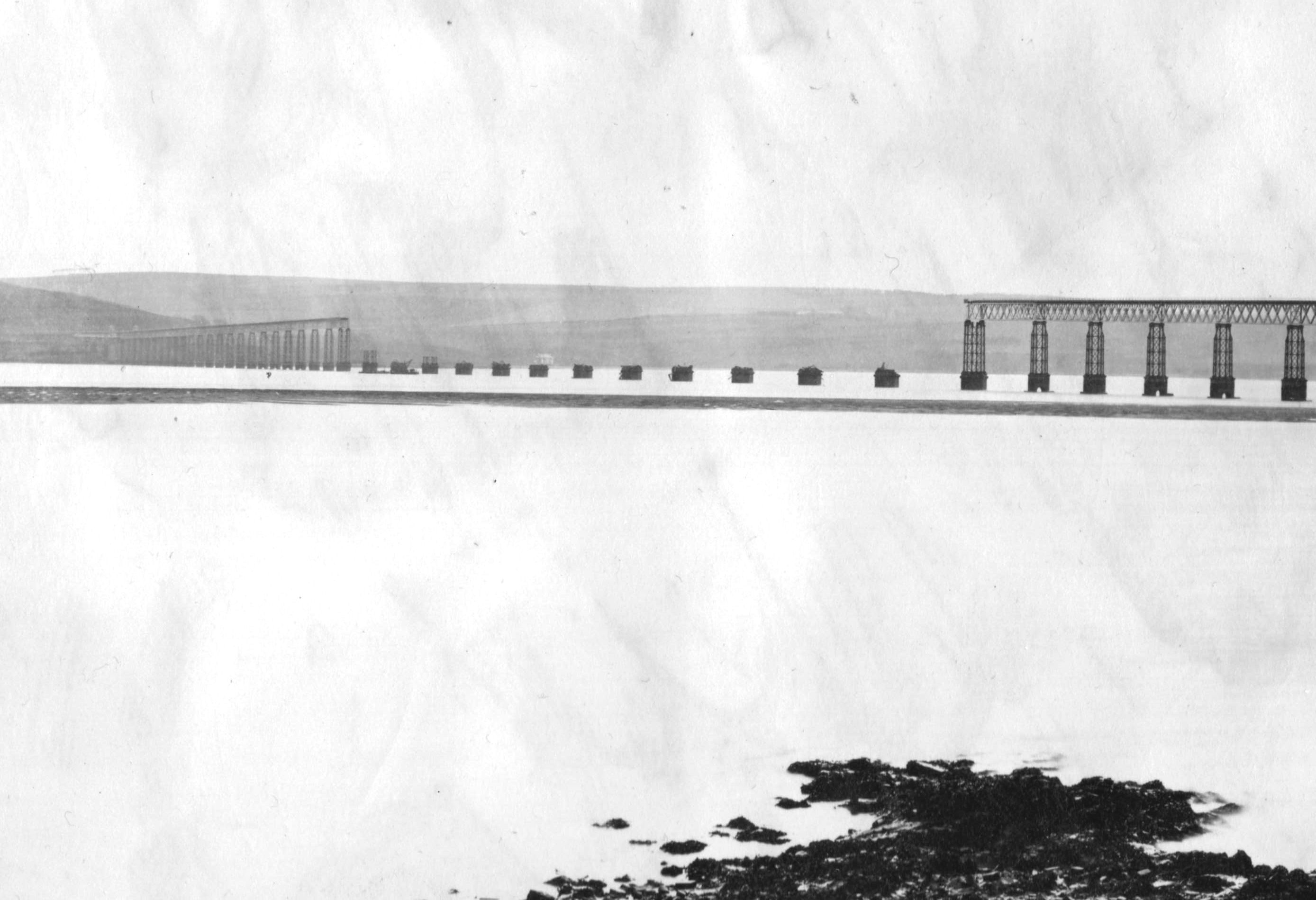
Fallen Tay Bridge from the north

In 1880 Kirkaldy tested many samples from the first Tay railway bridge for the official Inquiry into the collapse of the bridge's central section on 28 December 1879. He confirmed that the wrought iron tie bars failed at their connections to the cast iron columns of the bridge, when he tested intact tie bars with complete lugs still attached. The attachments were cast iron lugs which fractured at the bolt holes, and after the disaster numerous fractured lugs were found lying on the piers. The critical strengthening elements were much weaker than had been supposed by Thomas Bouch, the engineer of the first bridge. They failed at about 20 long tons (20 t) tensile load rather than the specified 60 long tons (61 t), and were a prime cause of the collapse of the bridge.

Since Kirkaldy tested several samples of each of the lower and upper lugs, he was able to show that they exhibited a range of strengths, the lowest results being caused by defects like blow holes in the cast metal. Thus some of the upper lugs were actually weaker than the strongest lower lugs, an observation confirmed by damage shown on the remains left on the piers after the disaster. He tested the wrought iron tie bars themselves, and they proved tough, as specified, although only slightly stronger than the cast iron lugs to which they were attached.

The high girders were also made of wrought iron and had a very high tensile strength. They were found after the accident at the bottom of the Tay estuary and had sustained relatively little damage compared with the cast iron columns which supported them. Some were reused in local houses, and when they were demolished in the 1960s, some were removed to the Royal Museum of Scotland in Edinburgh, where they are on public display.

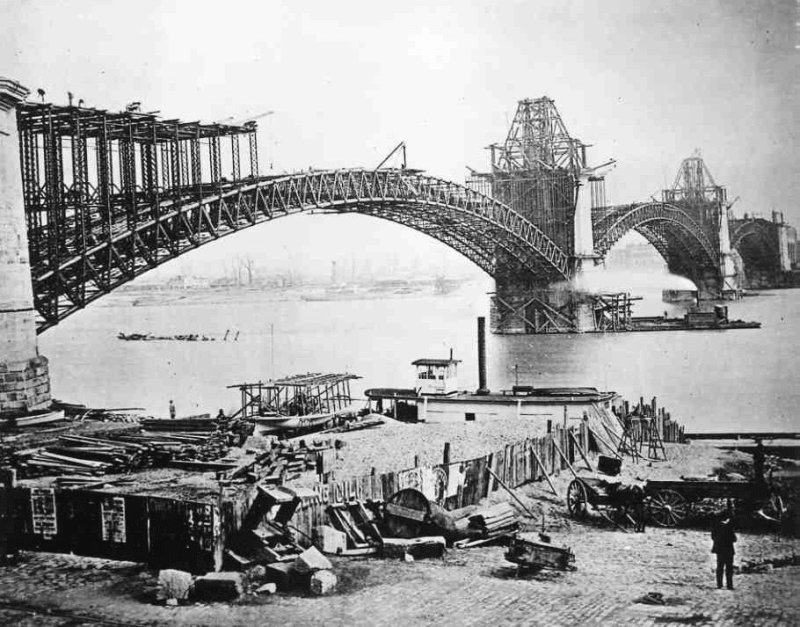
Building of the Eads Bridge, St. Louis, USA

== Kirkaldy Testing Works ==
Kirkaldy first operated his machine at premises on The Grove, Southwark, London SE1. His business was successful, and he moved the machine to larger purpose-built new premises at 99 Southwark Street, leased from the Crown Estate, in 1874.Today, the museum continues to serve as an educational and historical site. It operates with the help of volunteers and offers visitors a chance to see the Universal Testing Machine in action, breaking materials to demonstrate its capabilities. The museum's mission includes supporting STEM and STEAM excellence and providing an engaging learning environment through its "Material Difference" learning programme.

The new building was designed in an Italian Romanesque style by the architect Thomas Roger Smith and constructed in 1873. The four-storey building has five bays, and was built of brown and yellow stock bricks with buff banding and stucco details around the door and windows. In the centre of the facade is a sign "Kirkaldy's Testing and Experimenting Works" and over the door is the motto "Facts not Opinions".

The heavy machine was installed on the ground floor, supported by brick piers in the basement. The testing room retains many of its original features, including fitted shelving and matchboard dado, with a ceiling held up by cast iron beams supported by four iron pillars. The basement houses a Denison machine for testing marine chains, acquired by Kirkaldy in 1906.

After Kirkaldy's death in 1897, the testing works were run by his son William George Kirkaldy (1862–1914) and then by his widow Annie with a manager Dr Gilbert Henry Gulliver. Kirkaldy's grandson David William Henry Kirkaldy (1910–1992) took over in 1934. When he retired in 1965, the business was acquired by Treharne & Davies, but closed as a commercial venture in 1974. The upper floors of the building were converted into offices, but the basement and ground floors reopened as a museum in 1984. The works became a listed building in 1971, promoted to Grade II* in June 2014.

The new landlord had plans to convert the museum space into a restaurant, but negotiations to renew the museum's lease continue as of October 2015.
