= David Kirkaldy =

Scottish engineer (1820–1897)

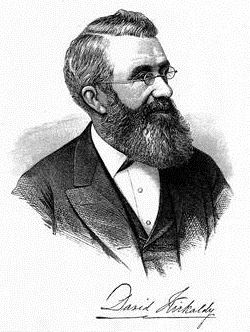
- Born: 4 April 1820; Dundee, Scotland
- Died: 25 January 1897 (aged 76); London
- Resting place: Highgate Cemetery
- Education: Edinburgh University
- Spouse: Isabella McPherson

David Kirkaldy (1820–1897) was a Scottish engineer who pioneered the testing of materials as a service to engineers during the Victorian period. He established a test house in Southwark, London and built a large hydraulic tensile test machine, or tensometer for examining the mechanical properties of components, such as their tensile strength and tensile modulus or stiffness.

== Career ==
David Kirkaldy was born in Mayfield east of Dundee in Scotland in 1820. He worked at Robert Napier’s Vulcan Foundry Works in Glasgow, and moved from workshop to drawing office. As a result of the industrial revolution, new materials were being developed such as steel to replace cast iron and wrought iron. The properties of these materials were not well understood. In conjunction with his work for Napier and Sons, Kirkaldy undertook a long series of tensile load tests between 1858 and 1861. He published his Results of an Experimental Inquiry into the Comparative Tensile Strength and other properties of various kinds of Wrought-Iron and Steel in 1862.

== Testing materials ==
Kirkaldy left Napier in 1861 and over the next two and a half years studied existing testing techniques and designed his own testing machine. Entirely at his own expense, he commissioned this machine from the Leeds firm of Greenwood & Batley, closely supervising its production. Aggrieved over the slow rate of manufacture, after fifteen months he had it delivered to London, still unfinished, in September 1865. The testing machine is 47 feet 7 inches long, weighs some 116 tons, and was designed to work horizontally, the load applied by a hydraulic cylinder and ram.

== Testing house ==
He set up business in Southwark in 1866, performing tests for external clients on materials used in engineered structures such as bridges. The business moved to a nearby purpose-built building at 99 Southwark Street, London in 1874. The present ground floor of the building is now the Kirkaldy Testing Museum, with many of his machines still there and in working order, including the original 1865 testing machine. The famous inscription above the door reads Facts not Opinions. With the many failed products either from his own tests or collected on site, he opened a "Black Museum" of failed products and components on the top floor of the building, but it was destroyed in the London Blitz of 1940. Fractured lug samples from the Tay Bridge disaster were probably stored and exhibited in the museum.

He developed ways of examining the microstructures of materials using a simple optical microscope after polishing and etching specimens taken from components.

== Tay Bridge Disaster ==
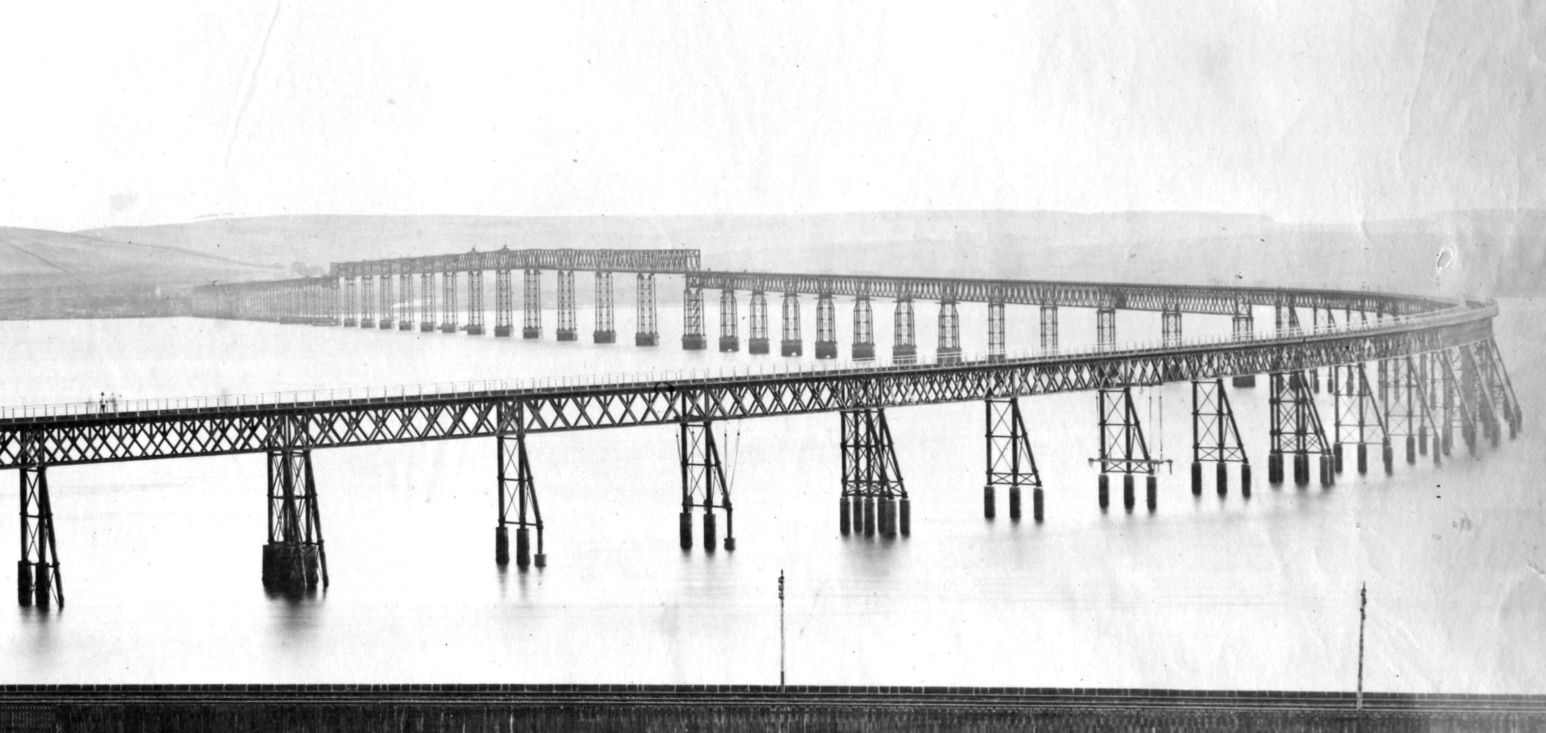
Original Tay Bridge from the north

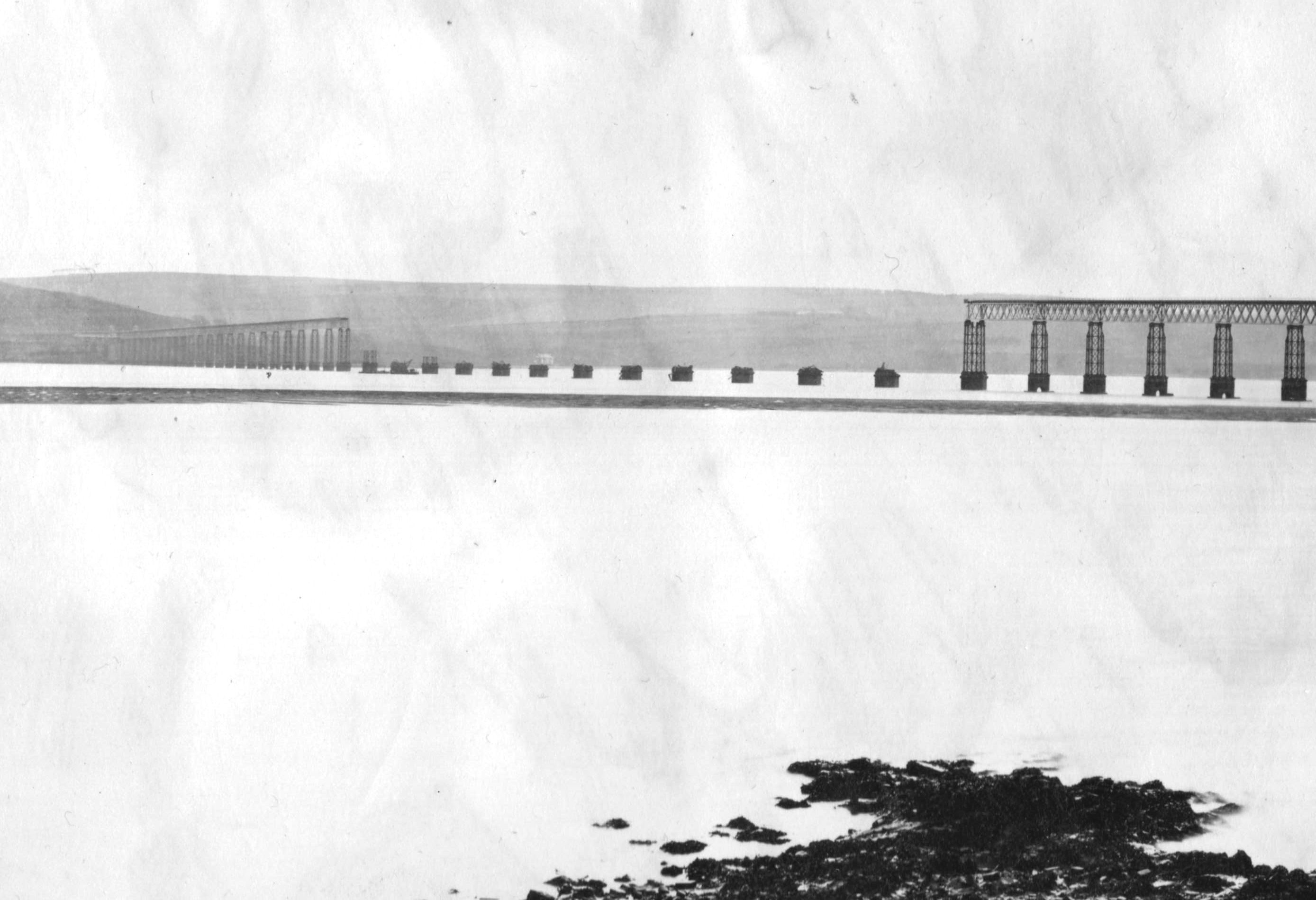
Fallen Tay Bridge from the north

Kirkaldy famously tested many samples taken from the first Tay railway bridge for the Official Inquiry on the Tay Bridge Disaster. He confirmed that the wrought iron tie bars failed at their connections to the cast iron columns of the bridge, when he tested intact tie bars with complete lugs still attached. The attachments were cast iron lugs which fractured at the bolt holes, and numerous fractured lugs were found after the disaster lying on the piers. The critical strengthening elements were much weaker than had been supposed by Thomas Bouch, the engineer of the first bridge. They failed at about 20 tons tensile load rather than the specified 60 tons, and were a prime cause of the collapse of the bridge on 28 December 1879.

Since he tested several samples of each of the lower and upper lugs, he was able to show that they exhibited a range of strengths, the lowest results being caused by defects like blow holes in the cast metal. Thus some of the upper lugs were actually weaker than the strongest lower lugs, an observation confirmed by damage shown on the remains left on the piers after the disaster. He tested the wrought iron tie bars themselves, and they proved tough, as specified, although only slightly stronger than the cast iron lugs to which they were attached. The high girders were also made of wrought iron and had a very high tensile strength. They were found after the accident at the bottom of the Tay estuary and relatively little damaged compared with the cast iron columns which supported them. Some were reused in local houses, and when they were demolished in the 1960s, some were removed to the Royal Museum of Scotland in Edinburgh, where they are on public display.

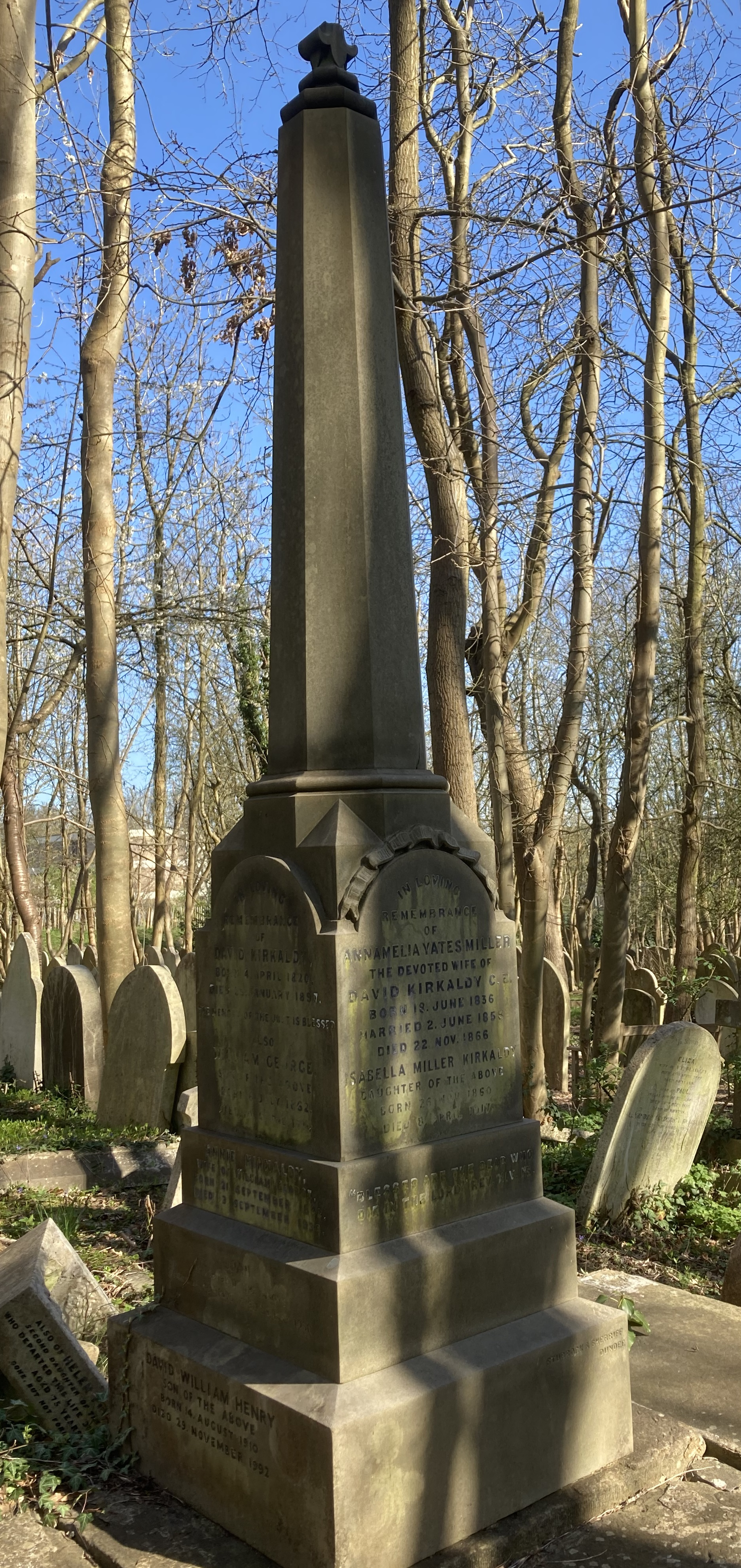
Family grave of David Kirkaldy in Highgate Cemetery

== Death ==
He died on 25 January 1897 and is buried in a family grave on the eastern side of Highgate Cemetery. He was succeeded by his son in the family business.

== Honours ==
He was inducted into the Scottish Engineering Hall of Fame in 2023.

== Bibliography ==
- WG Kirkaldy, Experimental Inquiry into the Comparative Tensile Strength and other properties of various kinds of Wrought-Iron and Steel (1862).
