= Postal Museum, London =

Museum in London, England

Coordinates: 51.5240°N 0.1126°W

The Postal Museum

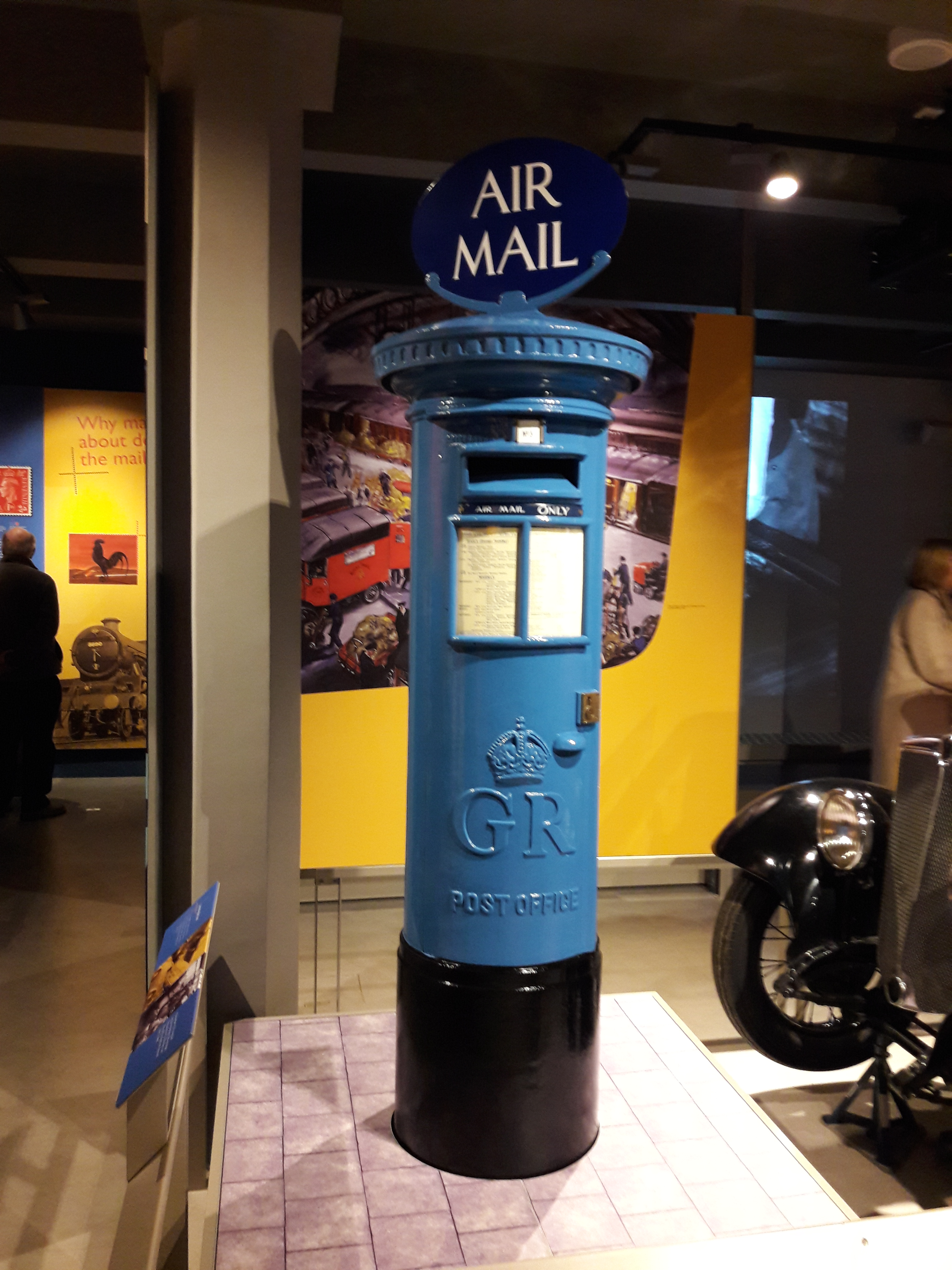
- An air mail postbox at the Postal Museum
- Established: 2004; 22 years ago
- Location: Clerkenwell; London, WC1; United Kingdom
- Public transit access: Farringdon; Russell Square
- Website: postalmuseum.org

The Postal Museum (formerly the British Postal Museum & Archive) is a postal museum run by the Postal Heritage Trust. It began in 2004 as The British Postal Museum & Archive and opened in Central London as The Postal Museum on 28 July 2017.

== Sites ==
The Postal Museum operates three sites: The museum at Phoenix Place, London near the Mount Pleasant sorting office in Clerkenwell, a museum store in Loughton, Essex and The Museum of the Post Office in the Community, located about the post office in Blists Hill Victorian Town, Shropshire.

== Origins ==
The Public Records Act 1838 was the first step in organizing government archives, including the civil service department known then as ‘the Post Office’. This represents the beginnings of what is now The Royal Mail Archive. By 1896 a report concerning the maintenance of Post Office records had been produced and the first archivist was appointed. The Public Records Acts of 1958 and 1967 reinforced the need for the Post Office to keep, catalogue and make its archive records available.

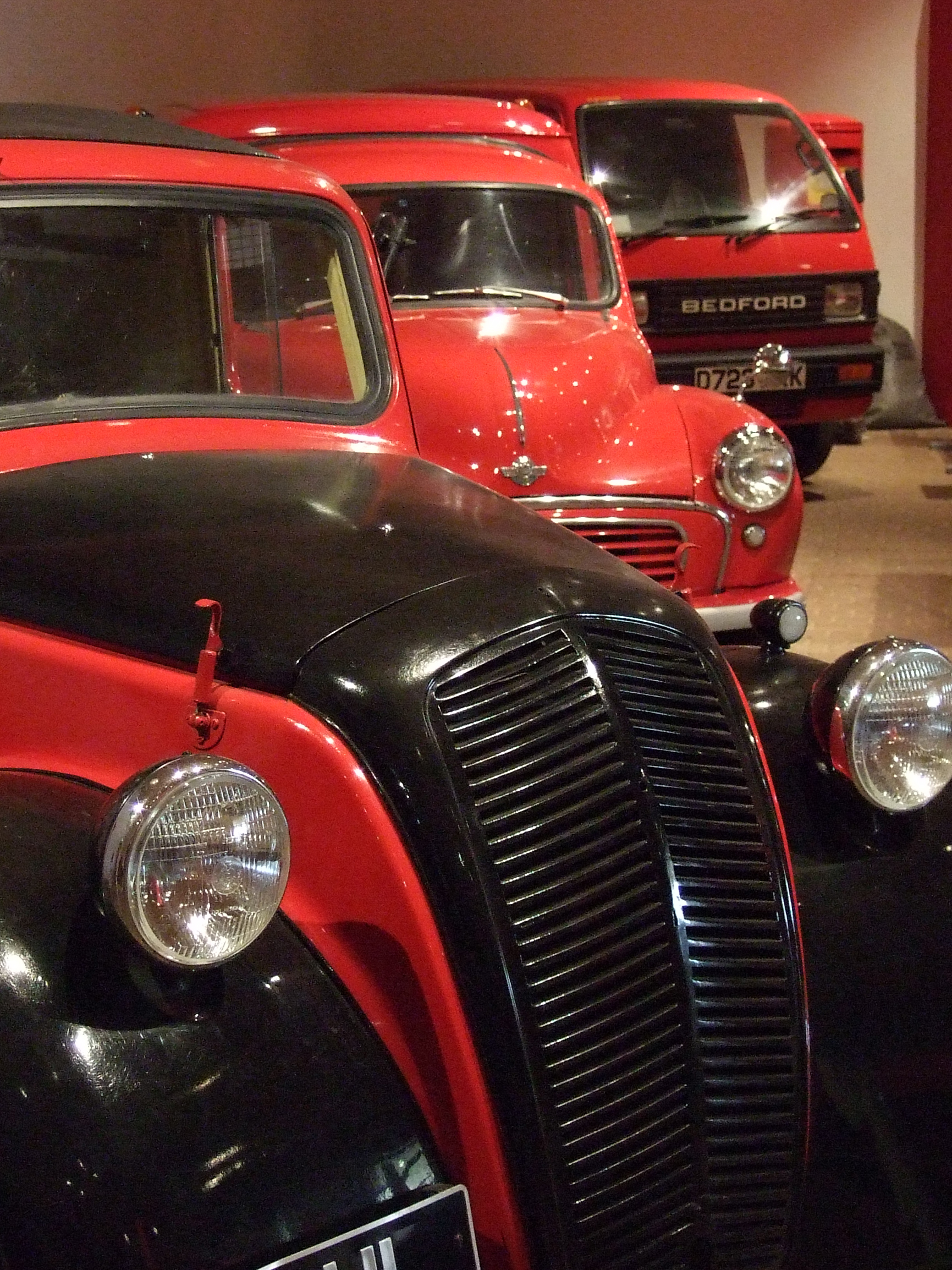
Post Office vehicles in the BPMA's collection.

In 1966, the first National Postal Museum (NPM) was established, in part due to The Phillips Collection of Victorian philately being donated to the nation by Reginald M. Phillips. The museum was opened by the Queen on 19 February 1969, at King Edward Building near St Paul's Cathedral in London. A collection of postal equipment, uniforms, vehicles and much more was developed over the years; far more than could be displayed in the small museum.

In 1998, the King Edward Building was sold, and the NPM closed. The collections were retained and the management of the museum and archive was combined. This was known as the Heritage unit of the Post Office (then renamed Consignia, then Royal Mail Group).

Royal Mail Group decided to transfer the work of this heritage unit to an independent charitable trust, in light of the changing mail market and its own shift from public service to competitive business. This 'Postal Heritage Trust' came into being in April 2004, and was branded as the British Postal Museum & Archive.

From 2004, the BPMA expanded its work into providing a programme of events, exhibitions, education and web resources.

== New Postal Museum ==
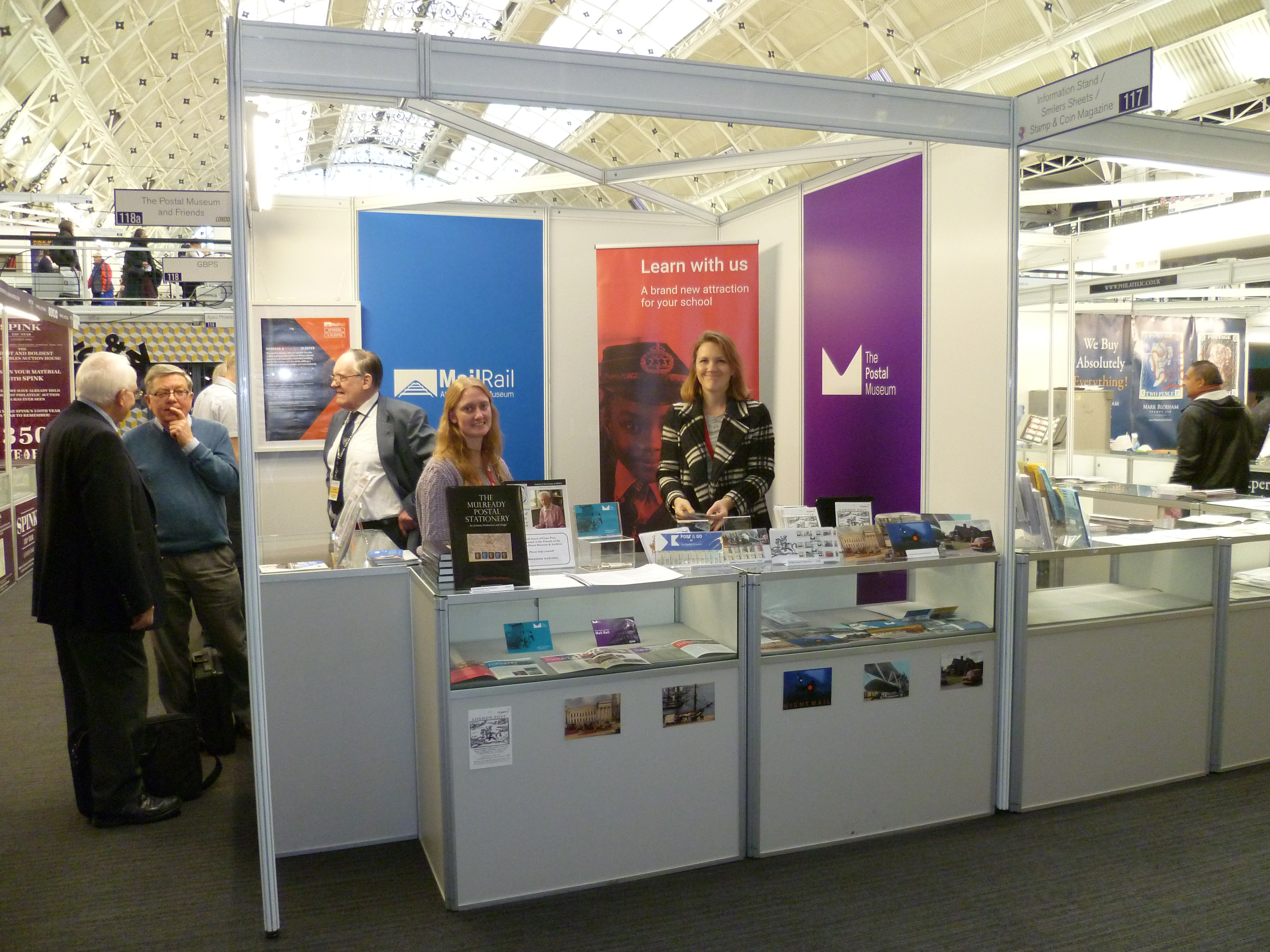
The Postal Museum booth at Spring Stampex 2016 in Islington, London

In February 2016, the BPMA was renamed the Postal Museum, and began building a new museum which opened in 2017 in Clerkenwell, London, near the Mount Pleasant Mail Centre. The museum was expected to cost £26 million to build, and consists of two sections. The Postal Museum has opened up to the public a 0.62 miles (1 km) stretch of track in London's Mail Rail, which was the world's first driverless electric railway. In the museum section, anticipated attractions include a commemorative stamp that would have been used had Scotland won the 1978 FIFA World Cup, telegrams from the night that the Titanic sank, the childhood stamp album of Freddie Mercury, and an intercepted first edition of Ulysses (banned in the United Kingdom until 1936).

== Relationship with Royal Mail ==
The Postal Museum is an independent charity but is strongly linked with Royal Mail Group. The former director of the Postal Museum is Adrian Steel. The Postal Museum receives an annual payment from Royal Mail for managing the Royal Mail archive. Although the archive is part of the Postal Museum, because it is a public record, the ultimate responsibility for it lies with Royal Mail. The records have been given official designated status which means that they are recognised as nationally important, and are available to researchers to consult.

In addition, current employees of either Royal Mail or Post Office are granted a reduced admission fee to both general admission and most special events.

== See also ==
- Postal museum
- Connected Earth
