= Mount Pleasant Mail Centre =

Sorting office in London, England

Coordinates: 51°31′29″N 0°06′43″W

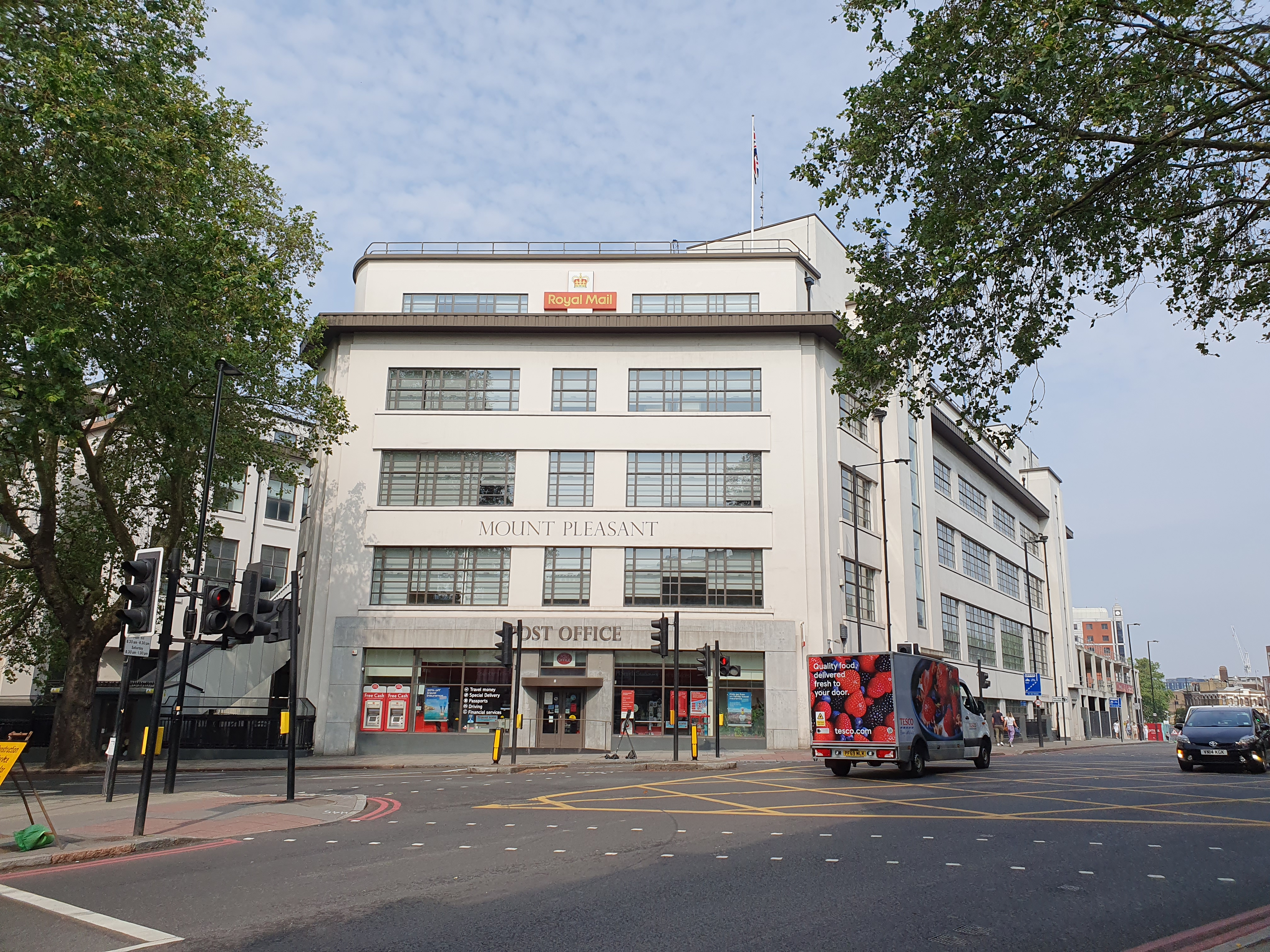
Mount Pleasant Post Office (2023).

The Mount Pleasant Mail Centre (often shortened as Mount Pleasant, known internally as the Mount and officially known as the London Central Mail Centre) is a mail centre operated by Royal Mail in London, England. The site has previously operated as one of the largest sorting offices in the world. It is located in the London Borough of Islington, on the boundary with the London Borough of Camden.

== Location ==
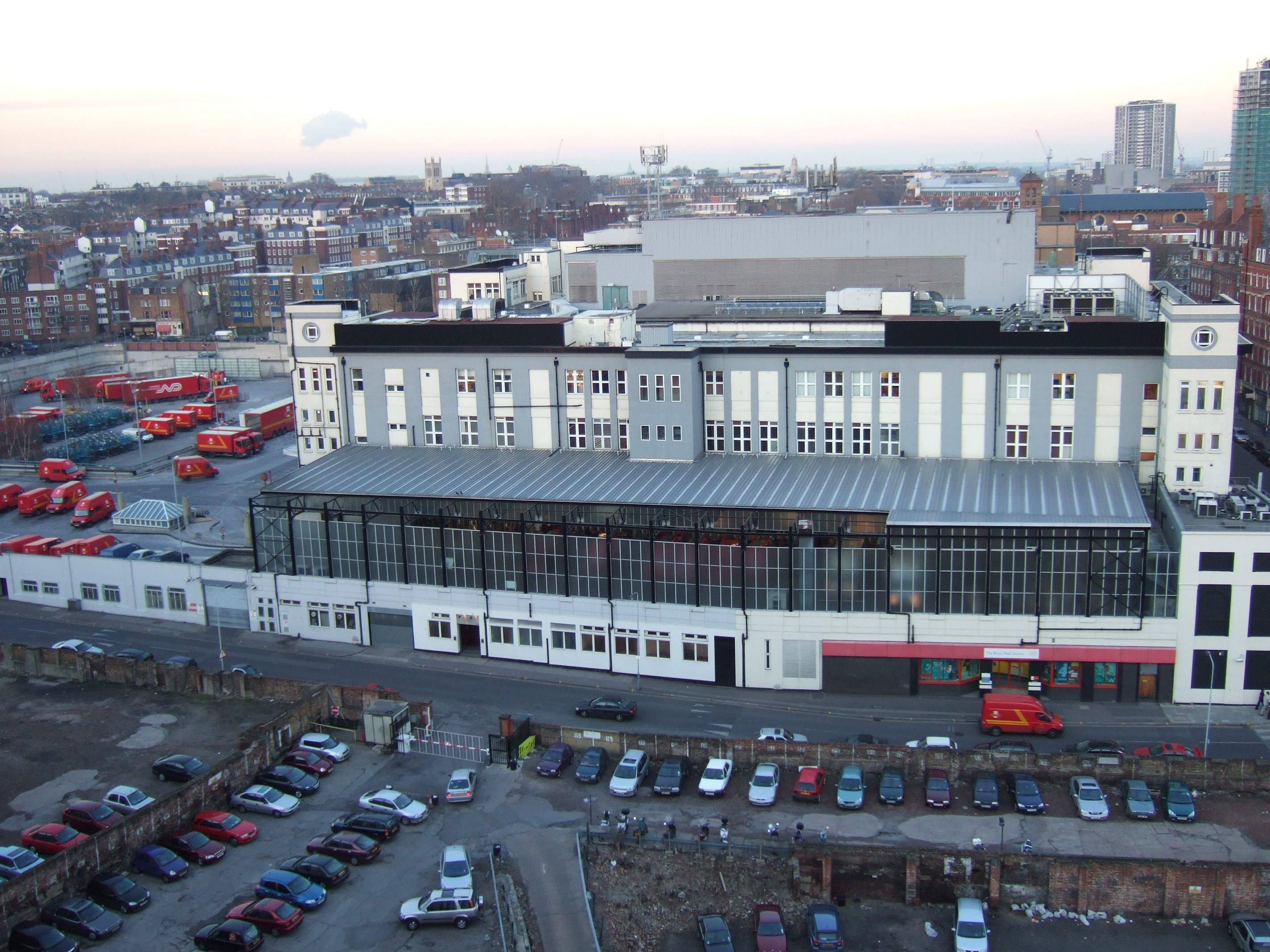
London's largest sorting office, Mount Pleasant, in 2007 (seen from the west, across the old staff car park on Phoenix Place).

It is located on a twelve-acre site in the Mount Pleasant area of Clerkenwell, at the junction between Farringdon Road and Rosebery Avenue and opposite Exmouth Market.

== History ==
The mail centre stands on the site of the former Coldbath Fields Prison that ceased to function in 1885. Its potential use for Post Office purposes was championed by Frederick Ebenezer Baines, Assistant Secretary of the General Post Office, who had been instrumental in establishing the parcel post service in 1882.

=== 19th century ===
Post Office (Sites) Act 1889
- Act of Parliament
- Parliament of the United Kingdom
- Long title: An Act to authorise the transfer of the Site of the Coldbath Fields Prison, in the County of Middlesex, to Her Majesty's Postmaster-General, and for other purposes.
- Citation: 52 & 53 Vict. c. ccix

Dates
- Royal assent: 30 August 1889

Other legislation
- Repealed by: Postal Services Act 2000 (Consequential Modifications to Local Enactments) Order 2003 (SI 2003/1542)

Status: Repealed

Text of statute as originally enacted

In the mid-1880s the parcel sorting office was located in the cramped basement of GPO East in St. Martin's Le Grand; Baines was actively seeking to remove it, preferably to a spacious site close to some of the main London railway termini. The Coldbath Fields Prison site fitted these criteria. In 1887 the Treasury sanctioned the use of the former treadmill house as a temporary parcel sorting office, and the GPO moved in in time to meet the Christmas rush. The sale of the rest of the site had to wait until an act of Parliament, the Post Office (Sites) Act 1889 (52 & 53 Vict. c. ccix), was passed. The centre was then officially opened on 30 August 1889.

The Post Office clerks did not like the name Coldbath Fields, which was associated with the prison in the public mind, so Baines took the name Mount Pleasant from an adjacent street (the name-change being announced in November that year). The street called Mount Pleasant had gained its name ironically in the 1730s after locals had begun to dump cinders and other refuse.

The Post Office (Sites) Act 1889 required the Post Office to provide a portion of the site, or £10,000, to London County Council for use as open space. The Post Office chose to retain the entire site, and provided the funds, which were used to purchase Spa Green Gardens in Clerkenwell.

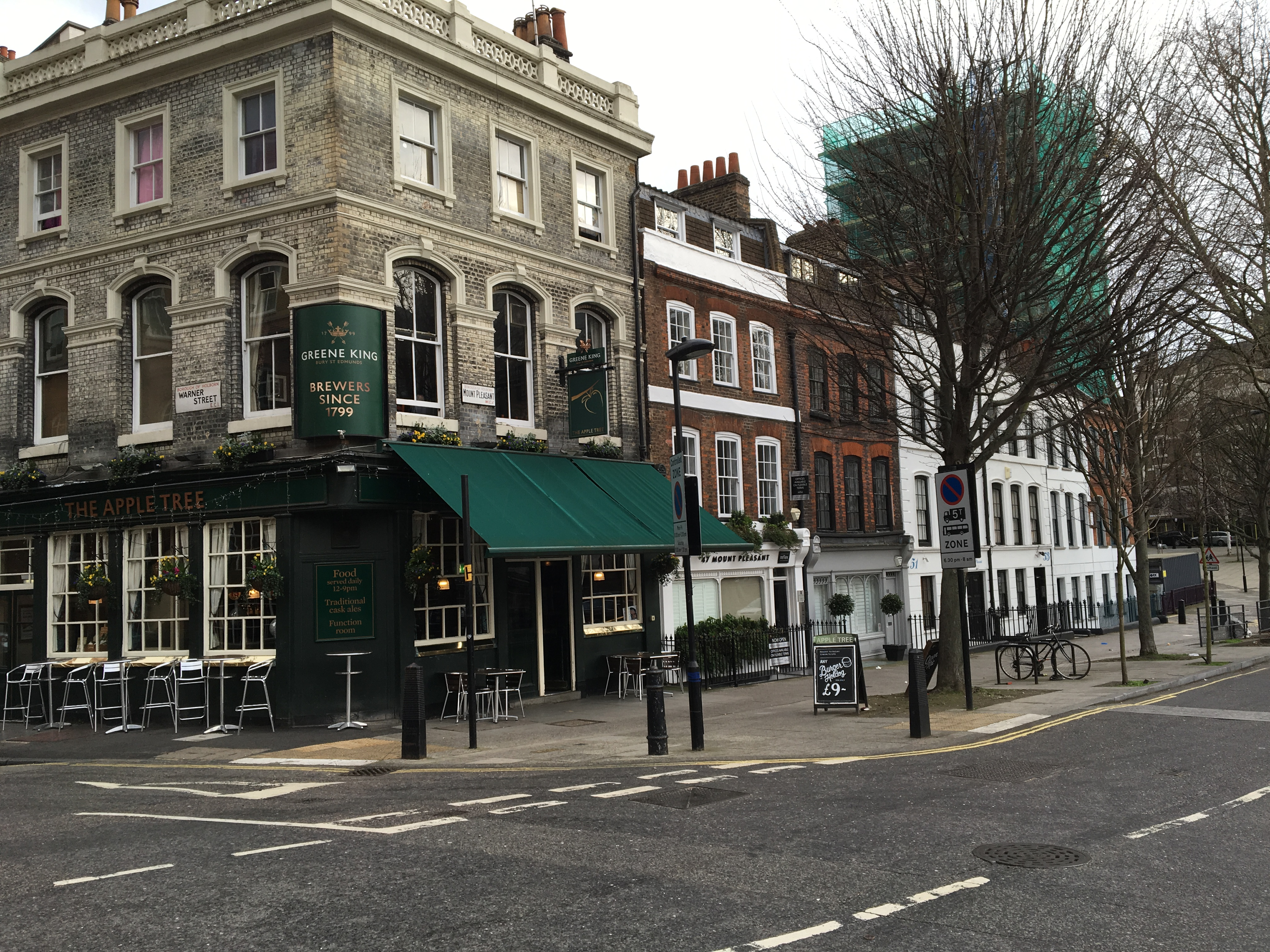
Mount Pleasant (street)

To begin with the prison buildings were used to house various Post Office departments: the prison bakehouse became the office of the Post Office Stores Department, the governor's house was used by the Telegraph Superintending Engineer (whose workshops expanded into other buildings in the eastern corner of the site); the chapel housed a hundred clerks of the Money Order Office (with a similar number being accommodated in what had been the governor's offices on the floors below), while the adjacent long cell-block was used for postal stores. (The Money Order Office moved out in 1897 to temporary accommodation in Fore Street; whereupon the stores department moved into the chapel and other vacated areas, and the cell-block was demolished.)

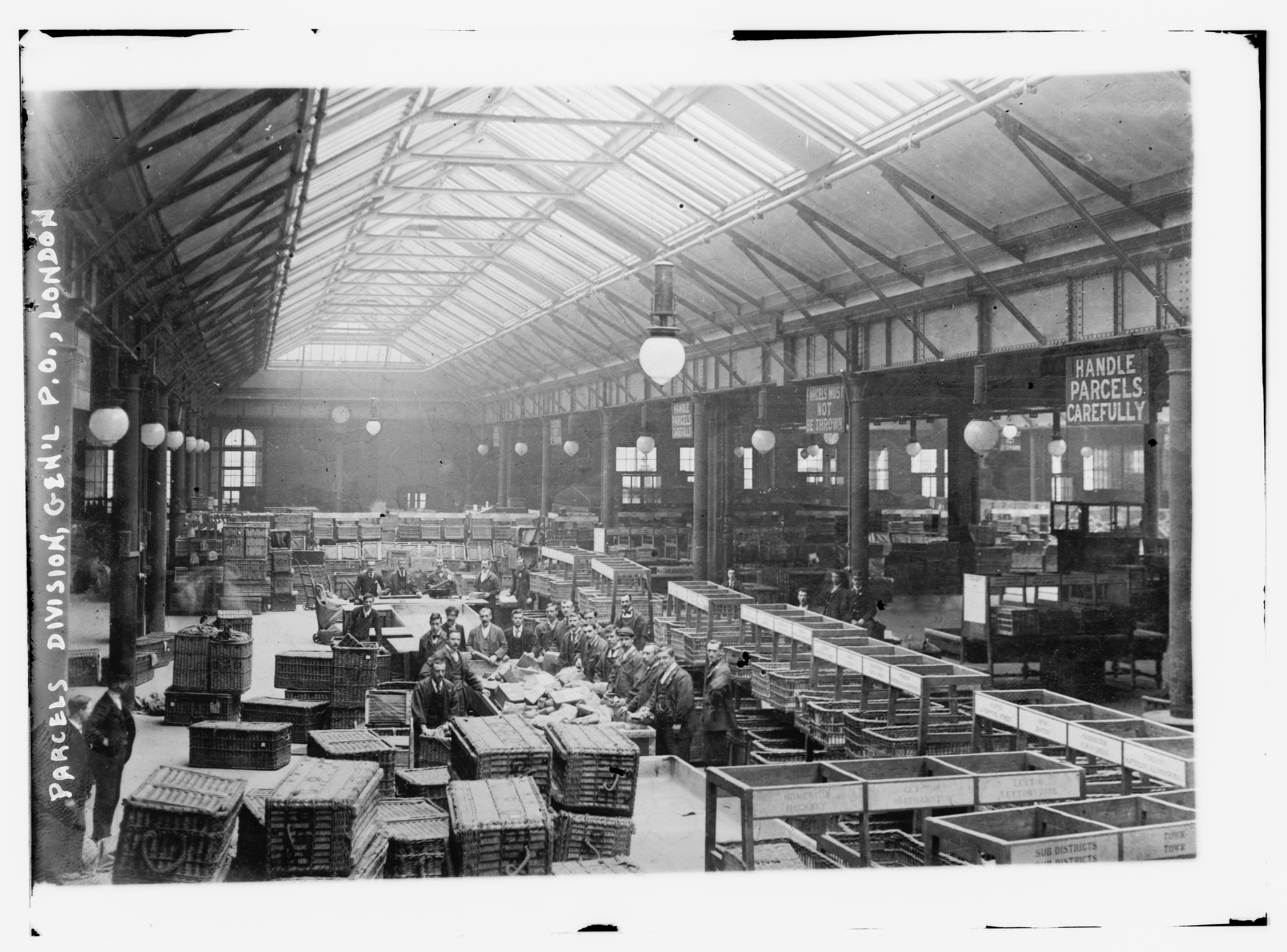
Inside Tanner's Parcel Office, 1910.

Meanwhile, the Post Office began to erect its own buildings on the site (designed for the most part by Sir Henry Tanner, principal architect of the Office of Works): a Telegraph Factory was built in 1890–92 in the southern corner of the site; and from 1889 to 1900 a vast new Parcel Office was built, in stages from north to south, over the whole of the northern (north-west) half of the site. (In spite of its name, the third and final section of the building was designed to accommodate the sorting of letters for the Inland section of the GPO, which was transferred here from St. Martin's Le Grand in 1900.) When finished the building was square in plan, with corner pavilions containing offices and ancillary services, and the central areas used for sorting. Two-thirds of the building was two storeys high, but the final section was double that height. On either side were glass-covered loading bays for the mail vans.

Following its completion the Postmaster General observed that:

"The Sorting Office at Mount Pleasant, which was completed in 1900, has a floor space of between six and seven acres. The length of the sorting tables is a mile and a half. Nearly 4,000 persons are employed there, and they deal with nearly 12,000,000 postal packets a week. Every day 1,730 mail vans call there, and 200 tons of mail matter pass through the Office".

=== 20th century ===
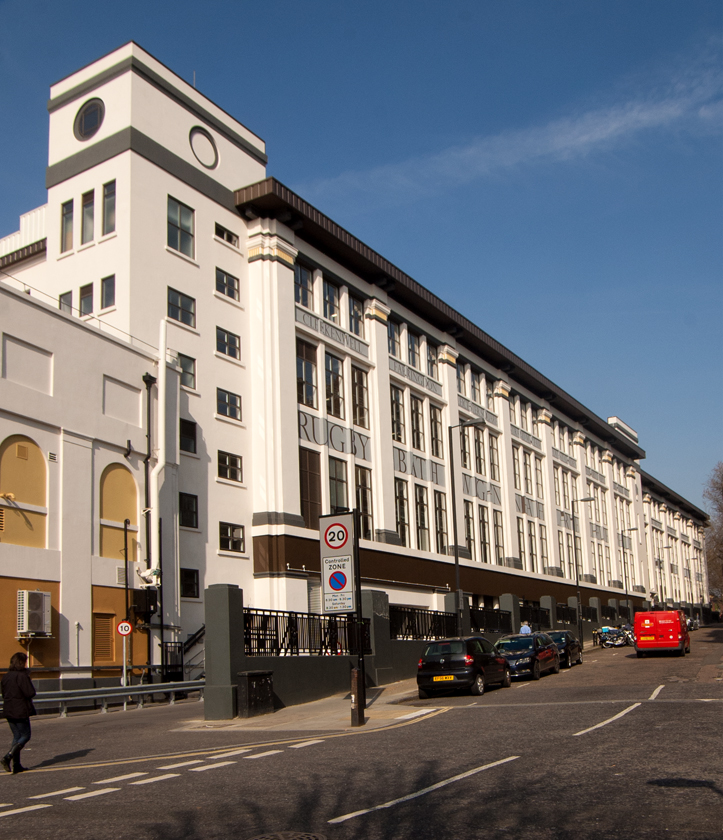
The Mail Centre as seen from Mount Pleasant (to the south).

Some of the original prison buildings survived into the 20th century. The prison gate was demolished in 1901 for an extension to the Telegraph Factory; but the governor's house and the chapel lasted through the First World War. Not long afterwards, however, they too were swept away (the Stores Department having moved out in 1915) for the building of a new Letter Sorting Office, designed by A. R. Myers, which was built (again in stages) across the southern half of the site, beginning in 1920. (The last vestiges of the prison were demolished in 1929.) In contrast to the red-brick Parcel Office, the new Letter Sorting Office was built in reinforced concrete; the eastern half was completed in 1926, the steel-framed western half in 1934. The Letter Sorting Office, said at the time to be the largest in Europe and the British Empire, was opened in November that year by the Duke and Duchess of York. It contained the latest mechanised equipment for sorting and distributing mail. A public post office was built on the corner of Rosebery Avenue and Farringdon Road as part of the same complex of buildings, which opened in 1937.

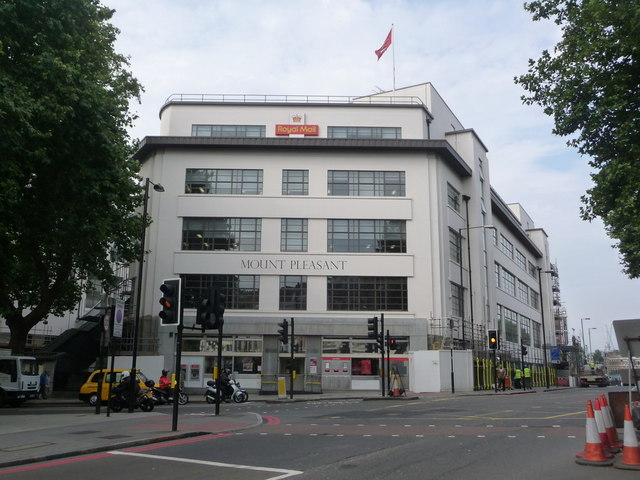
The public post office on Rosebery Avenue (to the east).

During the Second World War the Parcel Office was severely damaged by bombing raids in 1940 and 1943. By 1944 it had been rebuilt (at ground-floor level only) and brought back into use. An intended rebuild never took place, and eventually (in 1984) most of the parcel sorting was moved to Brent Cross and the remains of Tanner's building were demolished. Subsequently, the northern half of the site has functioned mainly as a van park (the last remaining parcel work was removed from Mount Pleasant to Camden Town in 1996).

From 1927 to 2003, Mount Pleasant was the central station and depot on the London Post Office Railway, which connected a number of Royal Mail offices and railways stations across London.

In 1979 Mount Pleasant pioneered the use of optical character recognition for sorting purposes with the installation of a machine.

=== 21st century ===
The art-deco Letter Sorting Office building remains in use, albeit much altered, both externally (with plastic windows and cladding) and internally.

In 2017 a new Postal Museum was opened on the site, located in Freeling House on the back of the sorting office. It provides public access below ground to the Post Office Railway depot, which now operates as a heritage railway.

==== Postal administration ====
The site is now the mail centre of the EC postcode area, the N postcode area, the W1 postcode district and the WC postcode area.

== Future ==
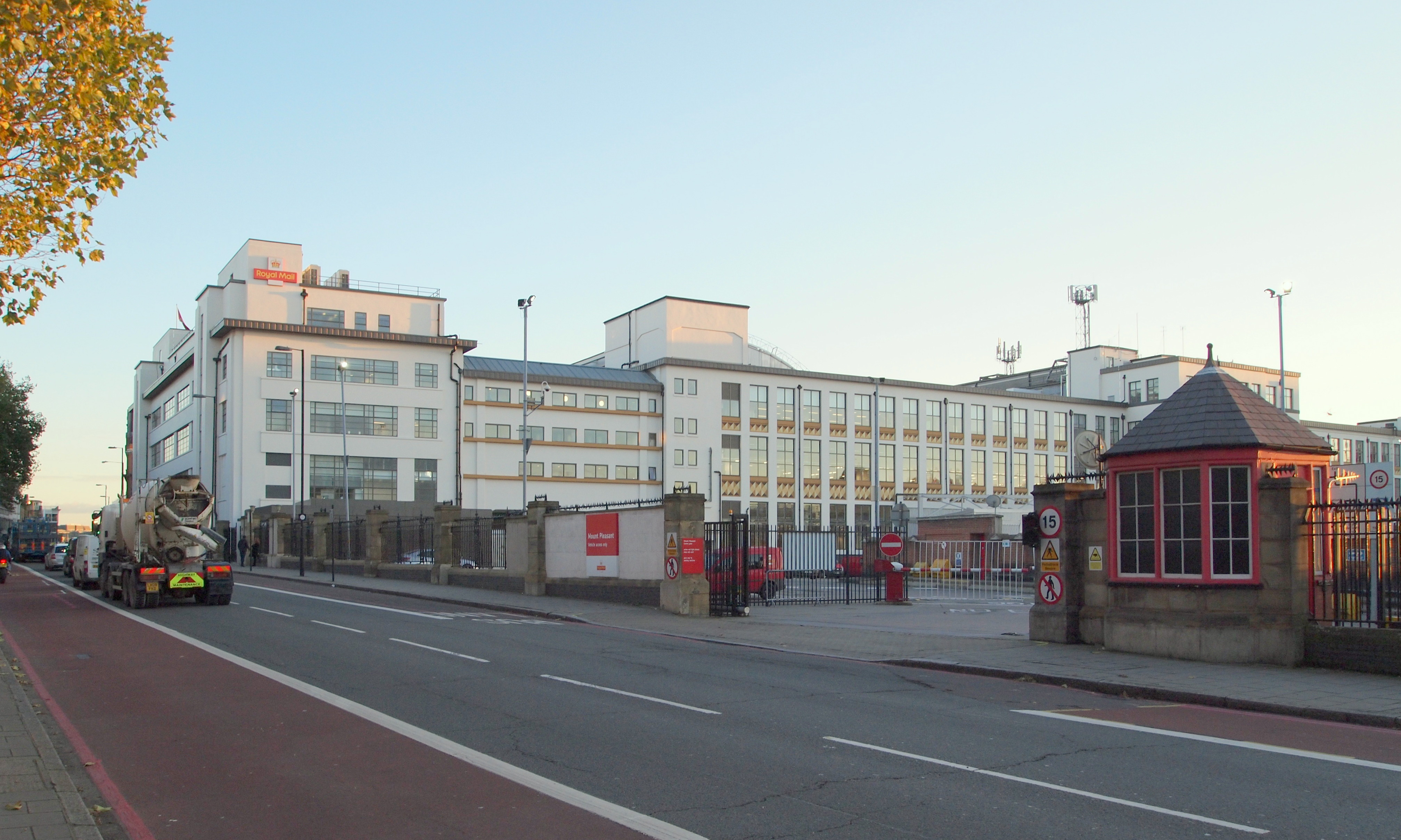
The Mail Centre as seen from the north, looking along Farringdon Road (prior to redevelopment).

In 2012 Royal Mail proposed selling off the northern half of the site, together with land to the west (on the other side of Phoenix Place) for residential and commercial redevelopment. The sites being sold for redevelopment had been mainly used for operational and staff vehicle parking, which was to be relocated underground as part of the scheme. The remaining operational part of the site was due to be modernised at the same time.

After a protracted dispute over affordable housing, development of the site, to include some 680 homes and named 'Postmark', began in 2018. The first phase, alongside Phoenix Place, was completed in 2021. The project as a whole is scheduled for completion in 2024.
