= Sorting office =

Location where postal operators bring mail for sorting

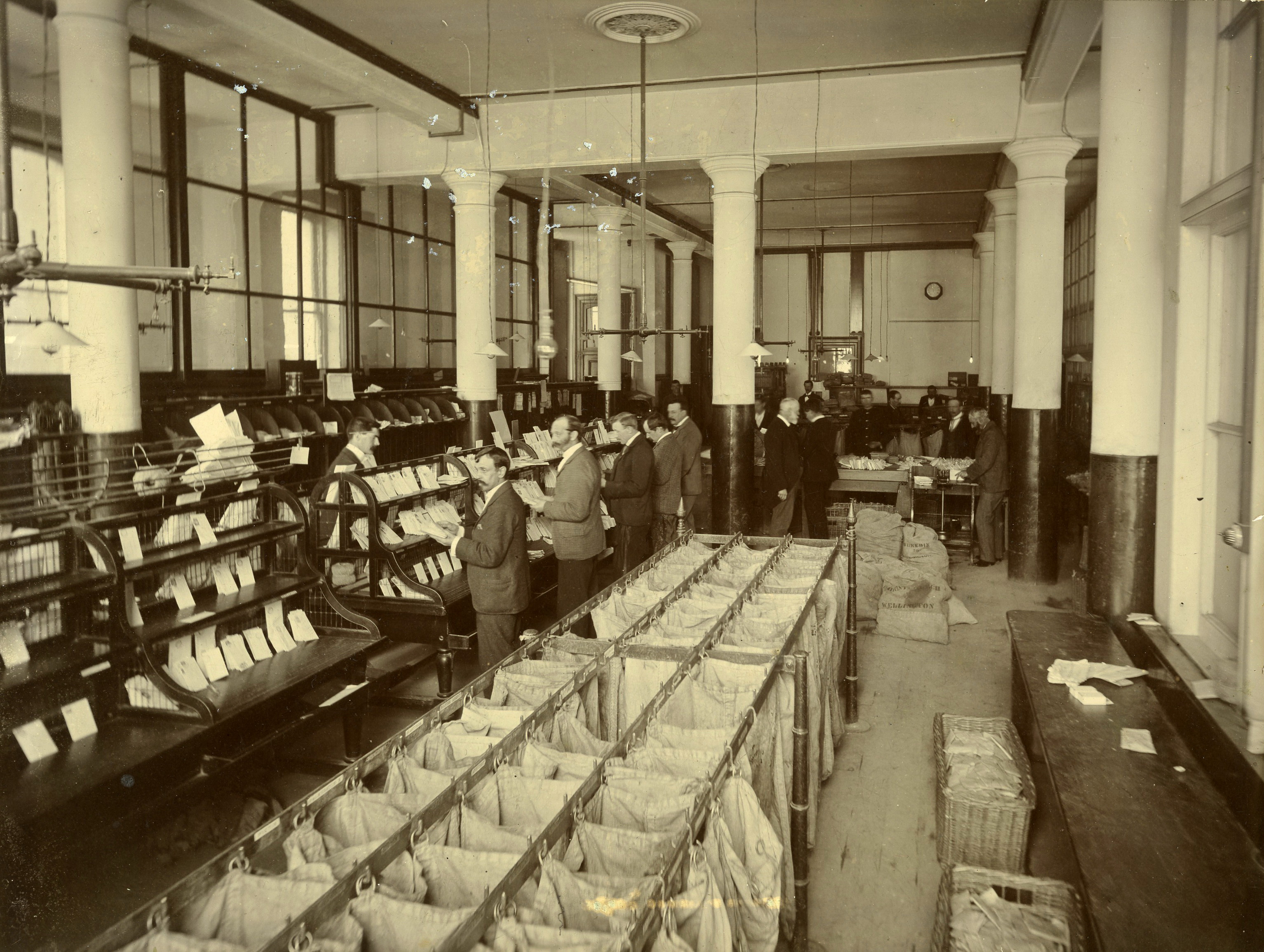
Mail sorting office in Wellington General Post Office, New Zealand c.1900

A sorting office or processing and distribution center (P&DC; name used by the United States Postal Service (USPS)) is any location where postal operators bring mail after collection for sorting into batches for delivery to the addressee, which may be a direct delivery or sent onwards to another regional or local sorting office, or to another postal administration.

Most countries have many sorting offices; the USPS has about 275. Some small territories such as Tahiti have only one. Sorting vans were used at various times; the UK had sorting vans, or carriages, in their Travelling Post Offices but those services were terminated in 2004. while in the USA the Railway Mail Service used a Railway post office for sorting the mail. As of 2017, Germany has about 95–98 sorting offices across the country.

The United Kingdom Royal Mail's Mount Pleasant Sorting Office was the world's largest sorting office at the beginning of the 20th century but is now only the largest one in London.

Military mail systems, such as the British Forces Post Office and U.S. Military Postal Service, have their own dedicated sorting offices.

== See also ==
- Mail Centre
- Post Office Sorting Van
- Sectional center facility (United States Postal Service)
- Travelling Post Office
