= List of post towns in the United Kingdom =

This is a list of post towns in the United Kingdom and Crown Dependencies, sorted by the postcode area (the first part of the outward code of a postcode).

Postcode area	Postcode name	Post towns
AB	Aberdeen	Aberdeen, Aberlour, Aboyne, Alford (Aberdeenshire), (Note: Not to be confused with Alford, Lincolnshire (LN).) Ballater, Ballindalloch, Banchory, Banff, Buckie, Ellon, Fraserburgh, Huntly, Insch, Inverurie, Keith, Laurencekirk, Macduff, Milltimber, Peterculter, Peterhead, Stonehaven, Strathdon, Turriff, Westhill
AL	St. Albans	Harpenden, Hatfield, St. Albans, Welwyn, Welwyn Garden City
B	Birmingham	Alcester, Birmingham, Bromsgrove, Cradley Heath, Halesowen, Henley-in-Arden, Oldbury, Redditch, Rowley Regis, Smethwick, Solihull, Studley, Sutton Coldfield, Tamworth, West Bromwich
BA	Bath	Bath (Somerset), (Note: Not to be confused with Bathgate, West Lothian (EH).) Bradford-on-Avon (Wiltshire), (Note: Not to be confused with Bradford, West Yorkshire (BD).) Bruton, Castle Cary, Frome, Glastonbury, Radstock, Shepton Mallet, Street, Templecombe, Trowbridge, Warminster, Wells, Westbury, Wincanton, Yeovil
BB	Blackburn	Accrington, Barnoldswick, Blackburn, Burnley, Clitheroe, Colne, Darwen, Nelson, Rossendale
BD	Bradford	Bingley, Bradford (West Yorkshire), (Note: Not to be confused with Bradford-on-Avon, Wiltshire (BA).) Cleckheaton, Keighley, Settle, Shipley, Skipton
BF	British Forces	BFPO (Note: Non-geographic postcode area and post town for UK mail delivered via the British Forces Post Office.)
BH	Bournemouth	Bournemouth, Broadstone, Christchurch, Ferndown, New Milton, Poole, Ringwood, Swanage, Verwood, Wareham, Wimborne
BL	Bolton	Bolton, Bury
BN	Brighton	Arundel, Brighton, Eastbourne, Hailsham, Hassocks, Henfield, Hove, Lancing, Lewes, Littlehampton, Newhaven, Peacehaven, Pevensey, Polegate, Seaford, Shoreham-by-Sea, Steyning, Worthing
BR	Bromley	Beckenham, Bromley, Chislehurst, Keston, Orpington, Swanley, West Wickham
BS	Bristol	Axbridge, Banwell, Bristol, Cheddar, Clevedon, Wedmore, Weston-super-Mare, Winscombe
BT	Belfast	Antrim, Armagh, Augher, Aughnacloy, Ballycastle, Ballyclare, Ballymena, Ballymoney, Ballynahinch, Banbridge, Bangor (County Down), (Note: Not to be confused with Bangor, Gwynedd (LL).) Belfast, Bushmills, Caledon, Carrickfergus, Castlederg, Castlewellan, Clogher, Coleraine, Cookstown, Craigavon, Crumlin, Donaghadee, Downpatrick, Dromore, Dungannon, Enniskillen, Fivemiletown, Hillsborough, Holywood, Larne, Limavady, Lisburn, Londonderry, Maghera, Magherafelt, Newcastle (County Down), (Note: Not to be confused with Newcastle upon Tyne, Tyne and Wear (NE); Newcastle Emlyn, Carmarthenshire (SA); Newcastle, Staffordshire (ST); or Newcastleton, Roxburghshire (TD).) Newry, Newtownabbey, Newtownards, Omagh, Portrush, Portstewart, Strabane
CA	Carlisle	Alston, Appleby-in-Westmorland, Beckermet, Brampton, Carlisle, Cleator, Cleator Moor, Cockermouth, Egremont, Frizington, Holmrook, Keswick, Kirkby Stephen, Maryport, Moor Row, Penrith, Ravenglass, Seascale, St. Bees, Whitehaven, Wigton, Workington
CB	Cambridge	Cambridge, Ely, Haverhill, Newmarket, Saffron Walden
CF	Cardiff	Aberdare, Bargoed, Barry, Bridgend, Caerphilly, Cardiff, Cowbridge, Dinas Powys, Ferndale, Hengoed, Llantwit Major, Maesteg, Merthyr Tydfil, Mountain Ash, Penarth, Pentre, Pontyclun, Pontypridd, Porth, Porthcawl, Tonypandy, Treharris, Treorchy
CH	Chester	Bagillt, Birkenhead, Buckley, Chester (Cheshire), (Note: Not to be confused with Chester le Street, County Durham (DH).) Deeside, Ellesmere Port (Cheshire), (Note: Not to be confused with Ellesmere, Shropshire (SY).) Flint, Holywell, Mold, Neston, Prenton, Wallasey, Wirral
CM	Chelmsford	Billericay, Bishop's Stortford, Braintree, Brentwood, Burnham-on-Crouch (Essex), (Note: Not to be confused with Burnham-on-Sea, Somerset (TA).) Chelmsford, Dunmow, Epping, Harlow, Ingatestone, Maldon, Ongar, Sawbridgeworth, Southminster, Stansted, Witham
CO	Colchester	Bures, Clacton-on-Sea, Colchester, Frinton-on-Sea, Halstead, Harwich, Manningtree, Sudbury, Walton on the Naze (Essex) (Note: Not to be confused with Walton-on-Thames, Surrey (KT).)
CR	Croydon	Caterham, Coulsdon, Croydon, Kenley, Mitcham, Purley, South Croydon, Thornton Heath, Warlingham, Whyteleafe
CT	Canterbury	Birchington, Broadstairs, Canterbury, Deal, Dover, Folkestone, Herne Bay, Hythe, Margate, Ramsgate, Sandwich, Westgate-on-Sea, Whitstable
CV	Coventry	Atherstone, Bedworth, Coventry, Kenilworth, Leamington Spa, Nuneaton, Rugby, Shipston-on-Stour, Southam, Stratford-upon-Avon, Warwick
CW	Crewe	Congleton, Crewe, Middlewich, Nantwich, Northwich, Sandbach, Tarporley, Winsford
DA	Dartford	Belvedere, Bexley, Bexleyheath, Dartford, Erith, Gravesend, Greenhithe, Longfield, Sidcup, Swanscombe, Welling
DD	Dundee	Arbroath, Brechin, Carnoustie, Dundee, Forfar, Kirriemuir, Montrose, Newport-on-Tay (Fife), (Note: Not to be confused with Newport Pagnell, Buckinghamshire (MK); Newport, Monmouthshire (NP); Newport, Isle of Wight (PO); Newport, Pembrokeshire (SA); or Newport, Shropshire (TF).) Tayport
DE	Derby	Alfreton, Ashbourne, Bakewell, Belper, Burton-on-Trent, Derby, Heanor, Ilkeston, Matlock, Ripley, Swadlincote
DG	Dumfries and Galloway	Annan, Canonbie, Castle Douglas, Dalbeattie, Dumfries, Gretna, Kirkcudbright, Langholm, Lockerbie, Moffat, Newton Stewart, Sanquhar, Stranraer, Thornhill
DH	Durham	Chester le Street (County Durham), (Note: Not to be confused with Chester, Cheshire (CH).) Consett, Durham, Houghton le Spring, Stanley
DL	Darlington	Barnard Castle, Bedale, Bishop Auckland, Catterick Garrison, Crook, Darlington, Ferryhill, Hawes, Leyburn, Newton Aycliffe, Northallerton, Richmond (North Yorkshire), (Note: Not to be confused with Richmond, Greater London (TW).) Shildon, Spennymoor
DN	Doncaster	Barnetby, Barrow-upon-Humber, Barton-upon-Humber, Brigg, Cleethorpes, Doncaster, Gainsborough, Goole, Grimsby, Immingham, Retford, Scunthorpe, Ulceby
DT	Dorchester	Beaminster, Blandford Forum, Bridport, Dorchester, Lyme Regis, Portland, Sherborne, Sturminster Newton, Weymouth
DY	Dudley	Bewdley, Brierley Hill, Dudley, Kidderminster, Kingswinford, Stourbridge, Stourport-on-Severn, Tipton
E	East London	London (Note: Covers areas of East London, but the post town is simply London. See London postal district.)
EC	East-Central London	London (Note: Covers areas of East Central London, but the post town is simply London. See London postal district.)
EH	Edinburgh	Balerno, Bathgate (West Lothian), (Note: Not to be confused with Bath, Somerset (BA).) Bo'ness, Bonnyrigg, Broxburn, Currie, Dalkeith, Dunbar, East Linton, Edinburgh, Gorebridge, Gullane, Haddington, Heriot, Humbie, Innerleithen, Juniper Green, Kirkliston, Kirknewton, Lasswade, Linlithgow, Livingston, Loanhead, Longniddry, Musselburgh, Newbridge, North Berwick, Pathhead, Peebles, Penicuik, Prestonpans, Rosewell, Roslin, South Queensferry, Tranent, Walkerburn, West Calder, West Linton
EN	Enfield	Barnet, Broxbourne, Enfield, Hoddesdon, Potters Bar, Waltham Abbey, Waltham Cross
EX	Exeter	Axminster, Barnstaple, Beaworthy, Bideford, Braunton, Bude, Budleigh Salterton, Chulmleigh, Colyton, Crediton, Cullompton, Dawlish, Exeter, Exmouth, Holsworthy, Honiton, Ilfracombe, Lynmouth, Lynton, North Tawton, Okehampton, Ottery St. Mary, Seaton, Sidmouth, South Molton, Tiverton, Torrington, Umberleigh, Winkleigh, Woolacombe
FK	Falkirk	Alloa, Alva, Bonnybridge, Callander, Clackmannan, Crianlarich, Denny, Dollar, Doune, Dunblane, Falkirk, Grangemouth, Killin, Larbert, Lochearnhead, Menstrie, Stirling, Tillicoultry
FY	Blackpool	Blackpool, Fleetwood, Lytham St. Annes, Poulton-le-Fylde, Thornton-Cleveleys
G	Glasgow	Alexandria, Arrochar, Clydebank, Dumbarton, Glasgow, Helensburgh
GL	Gloucester	Badminton, Berkeley, Blakeney, Cheltenham, Chipping Campden, Cinderford, Cirencester, Coleford, Drybrook, Dursley, Dymock, Fairford, Gloucester, Lechlade, Longhope, Lydbrook, Lydney, Mitcheldean, Moreton-in-Marsh, Newent, Newnham, Ruardean, Stonehouse, Stroud, Tetbury, Tewkesbury, Westbury-on-Severn, Wotton-under-Edge
GU	Guildford	Aldershot, Alton, Bagshot, Bordon, Camberley, Cranleigh, Farnborough, Farnham, Fleet, Godalming, Guildford, Haslemere, Hindhead, Lightwater, Liphook, Liss, Midhurst, Petersfield, Petworth, Sandhurst, Virginia Water, Windlesham, Woking, Yateley
GY	Guernsey	Guernsey
HA	Harrow	Edgware, Harrow, Northwood, Pinner, Ruislip, Stanmore, Wembley
HD	Huddersfield	Brighouse, Holmfirth, Huddersfield
HG	Harrogate	Harrogate, Knaresborough, Ripon
HP	Hemel Hempstead	Amersham, Aylesbury, Beaconsfield, Berkhamsted, Chalfont St. Giles, Chesham, Great Missenden, Hemel Hempstead, High Wycombe, Princes Risborough, Tring
HR	Hereford	Bromyard, Hereford, Kington, Ledbury, Leominster, Ross-on-Wye
HS	Outer Hebrides	Isle of Barra, Isle of Benbecula, Isle of Harris, Isle of Lewis, Isle of North Uist, Isle of Scalpay, Isle of South Uist, Stornoway
HU	Hull	Beverley, Brough, Cottingham, Hessle, Hornsea, Hull, North Ferriby, Withernsea
HX	Halifax	Elland, Halifax, Hebden Bridge, Sowerby Bridge
IG	Ilford	Barking, Buckhurst Hill, Chigwell, Ilford, Loughton, Woodford Green
IM	Isle of Man	Isle of Man
IP	Ipswich	Aldeburgh, Brandon, Bury St. Edmunds, Diss, Eye, Felixstowe, Halesworth, Harleston, Ipswich, Leiston, Saxmundham, Southwold, Stowmarket, Thetford, Woodbridge
IV	Inverness	Achnasheen, Alness, Ardgay, Avoch, Beauly, Cromarty, Dingwall, Dornoch, Elgin, Fochabers, Forres, Fortrose, Gairloch, Garve, Invergordon, Inverness, Isle of Skye, Kyle, Lairg, Lossiemouth, Muir of Ord, Munlochy, Nairn, Plockton, Portree, Rogart, Strathcarron, Strathpeffer, Strome Ferry, Tain, Ullapool
JE	Jersey	Jersey
KA	Kilmarnock	Ardrossan, Ayr, Beith, Cumnock, Dalry, Darvel, Galston, Girvan, Irvine, Isle of Arran, Isle of Cumbrae, Kilbirnie, Kilmarnock, Kilwinning, Largs, Mauchline, Maybole, Newmilns, Prestwick, Saltcoats, Stevenston, Troon, West Kilbride
KT	Kingston	Addlestone, Ashtead, Chertsey, Chessington, Cobham, East Molesey, Epsom, Esher, Kingston upon Thames, Leatherhead, New Malden, Surbiton, Tadworth, Thames Ditton, Walton-on-Thames (Surrey), (Note: Not to be confused with Walton on the Naze, Essex (CO).) West Byfleet, West Molesey, Weybridge, Worcester Park (Greater London) (Note: Not to be confused with Worcester, Worcestershire (WR).)
KW	Kirkwall	Berriedale, Brora, Dunbeath, Forsinard, Golspie, Halkirk, Helmsdale, Kinbrace, Kirkwall, Latheron, Lybster, Orkney, Stromness, Thurso, Wick
KY	Kirkcaldy	Anstruther, Burntisland, Cowdenbeath, Cupar, Dunfermline, Glenrothes, Inverkeithing, Kelty, Kinross, Kirkcaldy, Leven, Lochgelly, St. Andrews
L	Liverpool	Bootle, Liverpool, Ormskirk, Prescot
LA	Lancaster	Ambleside, Askam-in-Furness, Barrow-in-Furness, Broughton-in-Furness, Carnforth, Coniston, Dalton-in-Furness, Grange-over-Sands, Kendal, Kirkby-in-Furness, Lancaster, Millom, Milnthorpe, Morecambe, Sedbergh, Ulverston, Windermere
LD	Llandrindod Wells	Brecon, Builth Wells, Knighton, Llandrindod Wells, Llangammarch Wells, Llanwrtyd Wells, Presteigne, Rhayader
LE	Leicester	Ashby-de-la-Zouch, Coalville, Hinckley, Ibstock, Leicester, Loughborough, Lutterworth, Market Harborough, Markfield, Melton Mowbray, Oakham, Wigston
LL	Llandudno	Aberdovey, Abergele, Amlwch, Arthog, Bala, Bangor (Gwynedd), (Note: Not to be confused with Bangor, County Down (BT).) Barmouth, Beaumaris, Betws-y-Coed, Blaenau Ffestiniog, Bodorgan, Brynteg, Caernarfon, Cemaes Bay, Colwyn Bay, Conwy, Corwen, Criccieth, Denbigh, Dolgellau, Dolwyddelan, Dulas, Dyffryn Ardudwy, Fairbourne, Gaerwen, Garndolbenmaen, Harlech, Holyhead, Llanbedr, Llanbedrgoch, Llandudno (Conwy), (Note: Not to be confused with Llandudno Junction, Conwy (LL).) Llandudno Junction (Conwy), (Note: Not to be confused with Llandudno, Conwy (LL).) Llanerchymedd, Llanfairfechan, Llanfairpwllgwyngyll, Llangefni, Llangollen, Llanrwst, Llwyngwril, Marianglas, Menai Bridge, Moelfre, Penmaenmawr, Penrhyndeudraeth, Pentraeth, Penysarn, Porthmadog, Prestatyn, Pwllheli, Rhosgoch, Rhosneigr, Rhyl, Ruthin, St. Asaph, Talsarnau, Talybont (Gwynedd), (Note: Not to be confused with Talybont, Ceredigion (SY).) Trefriw, Ty Croes, Tyn-y-Gongl, Tywyn, Wrexham, Y Felinheli
LN	Lincoln	Alford (Lincolnshire), (Note: Not to be confused with Alford, Aberdeenshire (AB).) Horncastle, Lincoln, Louth, Mablethorpe, Market Rasen, Woodhall Spa
LS	Leeds	Ilkley, Leeds, Otley, Pudsey, Tadcaster, Wetherby
LU	Luton	Dunstable, Leighton Buzzard, Luton
M	Manchester	Manchester, Sale, Salford
ME	Rochester	Aylesford, Chatham, Faversham, Gillingham (Kent), (Note: Not to be confused with Gillingham, Dorset (SP).) Maidstone, Queenborough, Rochester, Sheerness, Sittingbourne, Snodland, West Malling
MK	Milton Keynes	Bedford, Buckingham, Milton Keynes, Newport Pagnell (Buckinghamshire), (Note: Not to be confused with Newport-on-Tay, Fife (DD); Newport, Monmouthshire (NP); Newport, Isle of Wight (PO); Newport, Pembrokeshire (SA); or Newport, Shropshire (TF).) Olney
ML	Motherwell	Airdrie, Bellshill, Biggar, Carluke, Coatbridge, Hamilton, Lanark, Larkhall, Motherwell, Shotts, Strathaven, Wishaw
N	North London	London (Note: Covers areas of North London, but the post town is simply London. See London postal district.)
NE	Newcastle upon Tyne	Alnwick, Ashington, Bamburgh, Bedlington, Belford, Blaydon-on-Tyne, Blyth, Boldon Colliery, Chathill, Choppington, Corbridge, Cramlington, East Boldon, Gateshead, Haltwhistle, Hebburn, Hexham, Jarrow, Morpeth, Newbiggin-by-the-Sea, Newcastle upon Tyne (Tyne and Wear), (Note: Not to be confused with Newcastle, County Down (BT); Newcastle Emlyn, Carmarthenshire (SA); Newcastle, Staffordshire (ST); or Newcastleton, Roxburghshire (TD).) North Shields, Prudhoe, Riding Mill, Rowlands Gill, Ryton, Seahouses, South Shields, Stocksfield, Wallsend, Washington, Whitley Bay, Wooler, Wylam
NG	Nottingham	Grantham, Mansfield, Newark, Nottingham, Sleaford, Southwell, Sutton-in-Ashfield
NN	Northampton	Brackley, Corby, Daventry, Kettering, Northampton, Rushden, Towcester, Wellingborough
NP	Newport	Abergavenny, Abertillery, Blackwood, Caerleon, Caldicot, Chepstow, Crickhowell, Cwmbran, Ebbw Vale, Monmouth, New Tredegar, Newport (Monmouthshire), (Note: Not to be confused with Newport-on-Tay, Fife (DD); Newport Pagnell, Buckinghamshire (MK); Newport, Isle of Wight (PO); Newport, Pembrokeshire (SA); or Newport, Shropshire (TF).) Pontypool, Tredegar, Usk
NR	Norwich	Attleborough, Beccles, Bungay, Cromer, Dereham, Fakenham, Great Yarmouth, Holt, Lowestoft, Melton Constable, North Walsham, Norwich, Sheringham, Walsingham, Wells-next-the-Sea, Wymondham
NW	North-West London	London (Note: Covers areas of North West London, but the post town is simply London. See London postal district.)
OL	Oldham	Ashton-under-Lyne, Bacup, Heywood, Littleborough, Oldham, Rochdale, Todmorden
OX	Oxford	Abingdon, Bampton, Banbury, Bicester, Burford, Carterton, Chinnor, Chipping Norton, Didcot, Kidlington, Oxford, Thame, Wallingford, Wantage, Watlington, Witney, Woodstock
PA	Paisley	Appin, Bishopton, Bridge of Orchy (Argyll), (Note: Not to be confused with Bridge of Weir, Renfrewshire (PA).) Bridge of Weir (Renfrewshire), (Note: Not to be confused with Bridge of Orchy, Argyll (PA).) Cairndow, Campbeltown, Colintraive, Dalmally, Dunoon, Erskine, Gourock, Greenock, Inveraray, Isle of Bute, Isle of Coll, (Note: Not to be confused with Isle of Colonsay (PA).) Isle of Colonsay, (Note: Not to be confused with Isle of Coll (PA).) Isle of Gigha, Isle of Iona, Isle of Islay, Isle of Jura, Isle of Mull, Isle of Tiree, Johnstone, Kilmacolm, Lochgilphead, Lochwinnoch, Oban, Paisley, Port Glasgow, Renfrew, Skelmorlie, Tarbert, Taynuilt, Tighnabruaich, Wemyss Bay
PE	Peterborough	Boston, Bourne, Chatteris, Downham Market, Hunstanton, Huntingdon, King's Lynn, March, Peterborough, Sandringham, Skegness, Spalding, Spilsby, St. Ives (Cambridgeshire), (Note: Not to be confused with St. Ives, Cornwall (TR).) St. Neots, Stamford, Swaffham, Wisbech
PH	Perth	Aberfeldy, Acharacle, Arisaig, Auchterarder, Aviemore, Ballachulish, Blairgowrie, Boat of Garten, Carrbridge, Corrour, Crieff, Dalwhinnie, Dunkeld, Fort Augustus, Fort William, Glenfinnan, Grantown-on-Spey, Invergarry, Isle of Canna, Isle of Eigg, Isle of Rum, Kingussie, Kinlochleven, Lochailort, Mallaig, Nethy Bridge, Newtonmore, Perth, Pitlochry, Roy Bridge, Spean Bridge
PL	Plymouth	Bodmin, Boscastle, Callington, Calstock, Camelford, Delabole, Fowey, Gunnislake, Ivybridge, Launceston, Lifton, Liskeard, Looe, Lostwithiel, Padstow, Par, Plymouth, Port Isaac, Saltash, St. Austell, Tavistock, Tintagel, Torpoint, Wadebridge, Yelverton
PO	Portsmouth	Bembridge, Bognor Regis, Chichester, Cowes, East Cowes, Emsworth, Fareham, Freshwater, Gosport, Havant, Hayling Island, Lee-on-the-Solent, Newport (Isle of Wight), (Note: Not to be confused with Newport-on-Tay, Fife (DD); Newport Pagnell, Buckinghamshire (MK); Newport, Monmouthshire (NP); Newport, Pembrokeshire (SA); or Newport, Shropshire (TF).) Portsmouth, Rowland's Castle, Ryde, Sandown, Seaview, Shanklin, Southsea, Totland Bay, Ventnor, Waterlooville, Yarmouth
PR	Preston	Chorley, Leyland, Preston, Southport
RG	Reading	Basingstoke, Bracknell, Crowthorne, Henley-on-Thames, Hook, Hungerford, Newbury, Reading, Tadley, Thatcham, Whitchurch (Hampshire), (Note: Not to be confused with Whitchurch, Shropshire (SY).) Wokingham
RH	Redhill	Betchworth, Billingshurst, Burgess Hill, Crawley, Dorking, East Grinstead, Forest Row, Gatwick, Godstone, Haywards Heath, Horley, Horsham, Lingfield, Oxted, Pulborough, Redhill, Reigate
RM	Romford	Dagenham, Grays, Hornchurch, Purfleet, Rainham, Romford, South Ockendon, Tilbury, Upminster
S	Sheffield	Barnsley, Chesterfield, Dronfield, Hope Valley, Mexborough, Rotherham, Sheffield, Worksop
SA	Swansea	Aberaeron, Ammanford, Boncath, Burry Port, Cardigan, Carmarthen, Clarbeston Road, Clynderwen, Crymych, Ferryside, Fishguard, Glogue, Goodwick, Haverfordwest, Kidwelly, Kilgetty, Lampeter, Llanarth, Llandeilo, Llandovery, Llandysul, Llanelli, Llanfyrnach, Llangadog, Llanwrda, Llanybydder, Milford Haven, Narberth, Neath, New Quay, Newcastle Emlyn (Carmarthenshire), (Note: Not to be confused with Newcastle, County Down (BT); Newcastle upon Tyne, Tyne and Wear (NE); Newcastle, Staffordshire (ST); or Newcastleton, Roxburghshire (TD).) Newport (Pembrokeshire), (Note: Not to be confused with Newport-on-Tay, Fife (DD); Newport Pagnell, Buckinghamshire (MK); Newport, Monmouthshire (NP); Newport, Isle of Wight (PO); or Newport, Shropshire (TF).) Pembroke, Pembroke Dock, Pencader, Port Talbot, Saundersfoot, Swansea, Tenby, Whitland
SE	South-East London	London (Note: Covers areas of South East London, but the post town is simply London. See London postal district.)
SG	Stevenage	Arlesey, Baldock, Biggleswade, Buntingford, Henlow, Hertford, Hitchin, Knebworth, Letchworth Garden City, Much Hadham, Royston, Sandy, Shefford, Stevenage, Ware
SK	Stockport	Alderley Edge, Buxton, Cheadle, Dukinfield, Glossop, High Peak, Hyde, Macclesfield, Stalybridge, Stockport, Wilmslow
SL	Slough	Ascot, Bourne End, Gerrards Cross, Iver, Maidenhead, Marlow, Slough, Windsor
SM	Sutton and Morden	Banstead, Carshalton, Morden, Sutton, Wallington
SN	Swindon	Calne, Chippenham, Corsham, Devizes, Faringdon, Malmesbury, Marlborough, Melksham, Pewsey, Swindon
SO	Southampton	Alresford, Brockenhurst, Eastleigh, Lymington, Lyndhurst, Romsey, Southampton, Stockbridge, Winchester
SP	Salisbury	Andover, Fordingbridge, Gillingham (Dorset), (Note: Not to be confused with Gillingham, Kent (ME).) Salisbury, Shaftesbury, Tidworth
SR	Sunderland	Peterlee, Seaham, Sunderland
SS	Southend-on-Sea	Basildon, Benfleet, Canvey Island, Hockley, Leigh-on-Sea, Rayleigh, Rochford, Southend-on-Sea, Stanford-le-Hope, Westcliff-on-Sea, Wickford
ST	Stoke-on-Trent	Leek, Newcastle (Newcastle-under-Lyme, Staffordshire), (Note: Not to be confused with Newcastle, County Down (BT); Newcastle upon Tyne, Tyne and Wear (NE); Newcastle Emlyn, Carmarthenshire (SA); or Newcastleton, Roxburghshire (TD).) Stafford, Stoke-on-Trent, Stone, Uttoxeter
SW	South-West London	London (Note: Covers areas of South West London, but the post town is simply London. See London postal district.)
SY	Shrewsbury	Aberystwyth, Bishops Castle, Borth, Bow Street, Bucknell, Caersws, Church Stretton, Craven Arms, Ellesmere (Shropshire), (Note: Not to be confused with Ellesmere Port, Cheshire (CH).) Llanbrynmair, Llandinam, Llanfechain, Llanfyllin, Llanidloes, Llanon, Llanrhystud, Llansantffraid, Llanymynech, Ludlow, Lydbury North, Machynlleth, Malpas, Meifod, Montgomery, Newtown, Oswestry, Shrewsbury, Talybont (Ceredigion), (Note: Not to be confused with Talybont, Gwynedd (LL).) Tregaron, Welshpool, Whitchurch (Shropshire), (Note: Not to be confused with Whitchurch, Hampshire (RG).) Ystrad Meurig
TA	Taunton	Bridgwater, Burnham-on-Sea (Somerset), (Note: Not to be confused with Burnham-on-Crouch, Essex (CM).) Chard, Crewkerne, Dulverton, Highbridge, Hinton St. George, Ilminster, Langport, Martock, Merriott, Minehead, Montacute, Somerton, South Petherton, Stoke-sub-Hamdon, Taunton, Watchet, Wellington
TD	Galashiels	Berwick-upon-Tweed, Cockburnspath, Coldstream, Cornhill-on-Tweed, Duns, Earlston, Eyemouth, Galashiels, Gordon, Hawick, Jedburgh, Kelso, Lauder, Melrose, Mindrum, Newcastleton (Roxburghshire), (Note: Not to be confused with Newcastle, County Down (BT); Newcastle upon Tyne, Tyne and Wear (NE); Newcastle Emlyn, Dyfed (SA); or Newcastle, Staffordshire (ST)) Selkirk
TF	Telford	Broseley, Market Drayton, Much Wenlock, Newport (Shropshire), (Note: Not to be confused with Newport-on-Tay, Fife (DD); Newport Pagnell, Buckinghamshire (MK); Newport, Monmouthshire (NP); Newport, Isle of Wight (PO); or Newport, Pembrokeshire (SA).) Shifnal, Telford
TN	Tunbridge Wells	Ashford (Kent), (Note: Not to be confused with Ashford, Surrey (TW).) Battle, Bexhill-on-Sea, Cranbrook, Crowborough, Edenbridge, Etchingham, Hartfield, Hastings, Heathfield, Mayfield, New Romney, Robertsbridge, Romney Marsh, Rye, Sevenoaks, St. Leonards-on-Sea, Tenterden, Tonbridge, Tunbridge Wells, Uckfield, Wadhurst, Westerham, Winchelsea
TQ	Torquay	Brixham, Buckfastleigh, Dartmouth, Kingsbridge, Newton Abbot, Paignton, Salcombe, South Brent, Teignmouth, Torquay, Totnes
TR	Truro	Camborne, Falmouth, Hayle, Helston, Isles of Scilly, Marazion, Newquay, Penryn, Penzance, Perranporth, Redruth, St. Agnes, St. Columb, St. Ives (Cornwall), (Note: Not to be confused with St. Ives, Cambridgeshire (PE).) Truro
TS	Cleveland	Billingham, Guisborough, Hartlepool, Middlesbrough, Redcar, Saltburn-by-the-Sea, Stockton-on-Tees, Trimdon Station, Wingate, Yarm
TW	Twickenham	Ashford (Surrey), (Note: Not to be confused with Ashford, Kent (TN).) Brentford, Egham, Feltham, Hampton, Hounslow, Isleworth, Richmond (Greater London), (Note: Not to be confused with Richmond, North Yorkshire (DL).) Shepperton, Staines-upon-Thames, (Note: Formerly "Staines". "New sectors and localities to 20 July 2012" (PDF). Royal Mail Address Management Unit. 20 July 2012. Archived from the original (PDF) on 11 December 2013.) Sunbury-on-Thames, Teddington, Twickenham
UB	Southall	Greenford, Hayes, Northolt, Southall, Uxbridge, West Drayton
W	West London	London (Note: Covers areas of West London, but the post town is simply London. See London postal district.)
WA	Warrington	Altrincham, Frodsham, Knutsford, Lymm, Newton-le-Willows, Runcorn, St. Helens, Warrington, Widnes
WC	West-Central London	London (Note: Covers areas of West Central London, but the post town is simply London. See London postal district.)
WD	Watford	Abbots Langley, Borehamwood, Bushey, Kings Langley, Radlett, Rickmansworth, Watford
WF	Wakefield	Batley, Castleford, Dewsbury, Heckmondwike, Knottingley, Liversedge, Mirfield, Normanton, Ossett, Pontefract, Wakefield
WN	Wigan	Leigh, Skelmersdale, Wigan
WR	Worcester	Broadway, Droitwich, Evesham, Malvern, Pershore, Tenbury Wells, Worcester (Worcestershire) (Note: Not to be confused with Worcester Park, Greater London (KT).)
WS	Walsall	Burntwood, Cannock, Lichfield, Rugeley, Walsall, Wednesbury
WV	Wolverhampton	Bilston, Bridgnorth, Willenhall, Wolverhampton
YO	York	Bridlington, Driffield, Filey, Malton, Pickering, Scarborough, Selby, Thirsk, Whitby, York
ZE	Lerwick	Shetland
