= List of postcode areas in the United Kingdom by population =

For the purposes of directing mail, the United Kingdom (although the populations listed just show figures for England, Wales and Northern Ireland), is divided by Royal Mail into postcode areas. The postcode area is the largest geographical unit used and forms the initial characters of the alphanumeric UK postcode. There are currently 121 geographic postcode areas in use in the UK, and a further 3 often combined with them which cover the Crown Dependencies of Guernsey, Jersey and Isle of Man.

Postcode area	Postcode area name	2011 Census population
AB	Aberdeen	500,309
AL	St Albans	250,427
B	Birmingham	1,904,658
BA	Bath	434,166
BB	Blackburn	488,917
BD	Bradford	578,336
BH	Bournemouth	551,987
BL	Bolton	380,259
BN	Brighton	802,831
BR	Bromley	299,293
BS	Bristol	940,241
BT	Belfast	1,876,695
CA	Carlisle	318,244
CB	Cambridge	421,467
CF	Cardiff	1,005,334
CH	Chester	659,743
CM	Chelmsford	653,492
CO	Colchester	411,418
CR	Croydon	405,982
CT	Canterbury	482,504
CV	Coventry	821,807
CW	Crewe	309,489
DA	Dartford	430,560
DD	Dundee	280,291
DE	Derby	730,620
DG	Dumfries	151,174
DH	Durham	309,211
DL	Darlington	360,975
DN	Doncaster	755,713
DT	Dorchester	213,203
DY	Dudley	410,598
E	East London	990,035
EC	East Central London	33,205
EH	Edinburgh	868,938
EN	Enfield	344,434
EX	Exeter	547,511
FK	Falkirk	276,600
FY	Blackpool	276,623
G	Glasgow	1,184,619
GL	Gloucester	605,821
GU	Guildford	725,368
GY	Guernsey and dependencies	
HA	Harrow	480,953
HD	Huddersfield	262,814
HG	Harrogate	138,343
HP	Hemel Hempstead	488,351
HR	Hereford	176,493
HS	Outer Hebrides	27,684
HU	Hull	443,223
HX	Halifax	160,378
IG	Ilford	335,694
IM	Isle of Man	
IP	Ipswich	595,934
IV	Inverness	228,244
JE	Jersey	
KA	Kilmarnock	371,478
KT	Kingston upon Thames	531,664
KW	Kirkwall	53,203
KY	Kirkcaldy	364,238
L	Liverpool	857,079
LA	Lancaster	328,704
LD	Llandrindod Wells	49,792
LE	Leicester	985,795
LL	Llandudno	537,467
LN	Lincoln	293,310
LS	Leeds	774,180
LU	Luton	335,950
M	Manchester	1,167,402
ME	Medway	607,143
MK	Milton Keynes	507,978
ML	Motherwell	383,317
N	North London	848,197
NE	Newcastle upon Tyne	1,162,698
NG	Nottingham	1,163,185
NN	Northampton	653,215
NP	Newport	488,368
NR	Norwich	722,087
NW	North West London	551,407
OL	Oldham	462,833
OX	Oxford	612,827
PA	Paisley	321,691
PE	Peterborough	890,223
PH	Perth	165,367
PL	Plymouth	542,719
PO	Portsmouth	822,331
PR	Preston	520,556
RG	Reading	778,677
RH	Redhill	532,536
RM	Romford	516,824
S	Sheffield	1,358,507
SA	Swansea	730,232
SE	South East London	988,702
SG	Stevenage	402,911
SK	Stockport	603,795
SL	Slough	373,607
SM	Sutton	217,048
SN	Swindon	459,049
SO	Southampton	665,193
SP	Salisbury	232,524
SR	Sunderland	250,826
SS	Southend-on-Sea	518,677
ST	Stoke-on-Trent	644,068
SW	South West London	874,844
SY	Shrewsbury	342,140
TA	Taunton	322,197
TD	Tweeddale	94,483
TF	Telford	212,061
TN	Tunbridge Wells	680,816
TQ	Torquay	281,404
TR	Truro	293,864
TS	Cleveland	602,474
TW	Twickenham	490,472
UB	Southall	371,969
W	West London	533,706
WA	Warrington	616,180
WC	West Central London	35,995
WD	Watford	255,988
WF	Wakefield	512,657
WN	Wigan	308,483
WR	Worcester	287,414
WS	Walsall	449,687
WV	Wolverhampton	395,857
YO	York	562,439
ZE	Zetland	23,167
