= North London =

Informal division of London, England

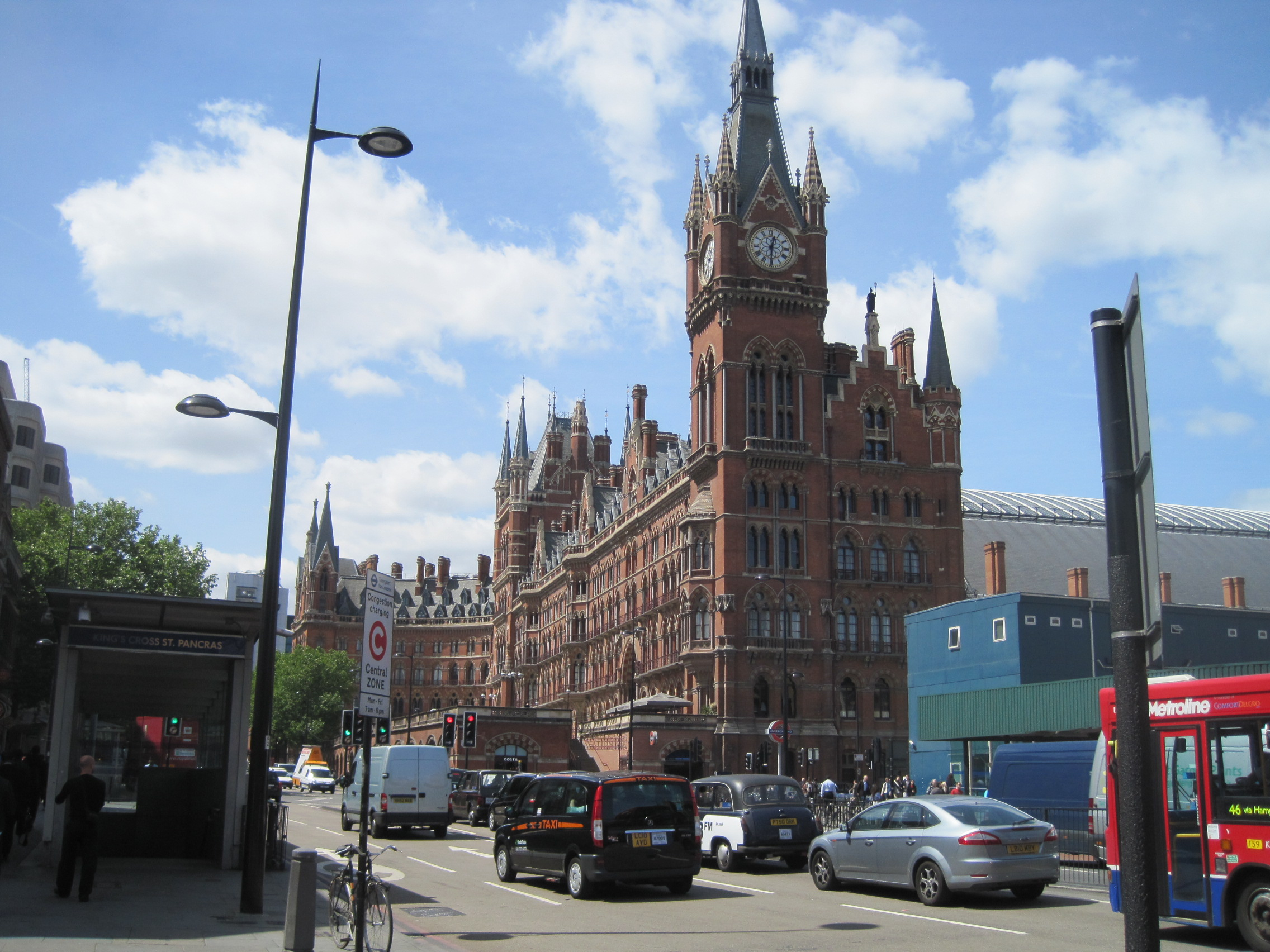
St Pancras station. North London's development owed much to the arrival of the railway.

North London is the northern part of London, England, north of the River Thames and the City of London. It extends from Clerkenwell and Finsbury, on the edge of the City of London financial district, to Greater London's boundary with Hertfordshire. The term is occasionally used in reference to all of London north of the River Thames.

The term differentiates the area from South London, East London and West London. Some parts of North London are also part of Central London.

== Development ==
The first northern suburb developed in the Soke of Cripplegate in the early part of the twelfth century, but London's growth beyond its Roman northern gates was slower than in other directions, partly because of the marshy ground north of the wall and also because the roads through those gates were less well-connected than elsewhere. The parishes that would become north London were almost entirely rural until the Victorian period. Many of these parishes were grouped into an area called the Finsbury division of Middlesex.

In the early part of the 19th century, the arrival of Regent's Canal in Islington and St Pancras stimulated London's northerly expansion, continuing when the development of the railway network accelerated urbanisation, promoting economic growth in the capital and allowing for the establishment of commuter suburbs.

This trend continued in the twentieth century and was reinforced by motorcar-based commuting until the establishment—shortly after the Second World War—of the Metropolitan Green Belt, which prevented urban London from expanding any further.

== Governance ==
There are six London boroughs that cover areas north of the City of London, and which on that basis might, partially or wholly, be described as comprising North London. They are Barnet, Camden, Enfield, Hackney, Haringey and Islington. Each London borough is governed by a London borough council local authority. All six boroughs participate in the North London Waste Authority. Some local government functions are held by the Greater London Authority, made up of the Mayor of London and the London Assembly.

London borough	Postcode areas	2011 sub-region	London Assembly
Barnet	EN, HA, N, NW	North	Barnet and Camden
Camden	EC, WC, N, NW, W	Central	Barnet and Camden
Enfield	EN, N	North	Enfield and Haringey
Hackney	E, EC, N	East	North East
Haringey	N	North	Enfield and Haringey
Islington	EC, WC, N	Central	North East

== Formal and cultural uses ==
=== Planning Policy sub-region ===
Revised sub regions from the London Plan. The North London sub-region extends from Watling Street to the Middle Lea, but excludes more central areas of north London.

The 2011 London Plan included a North sub-region, to be used for planning, engagement, resource allocation and progress reporting purposes. It consisted of the London Boroughs of Barnet, Haringey and Enfield. The 2004-2008 and 2008-2011 London Plan sub-regions varied in their composition.

=== N postcode area ===
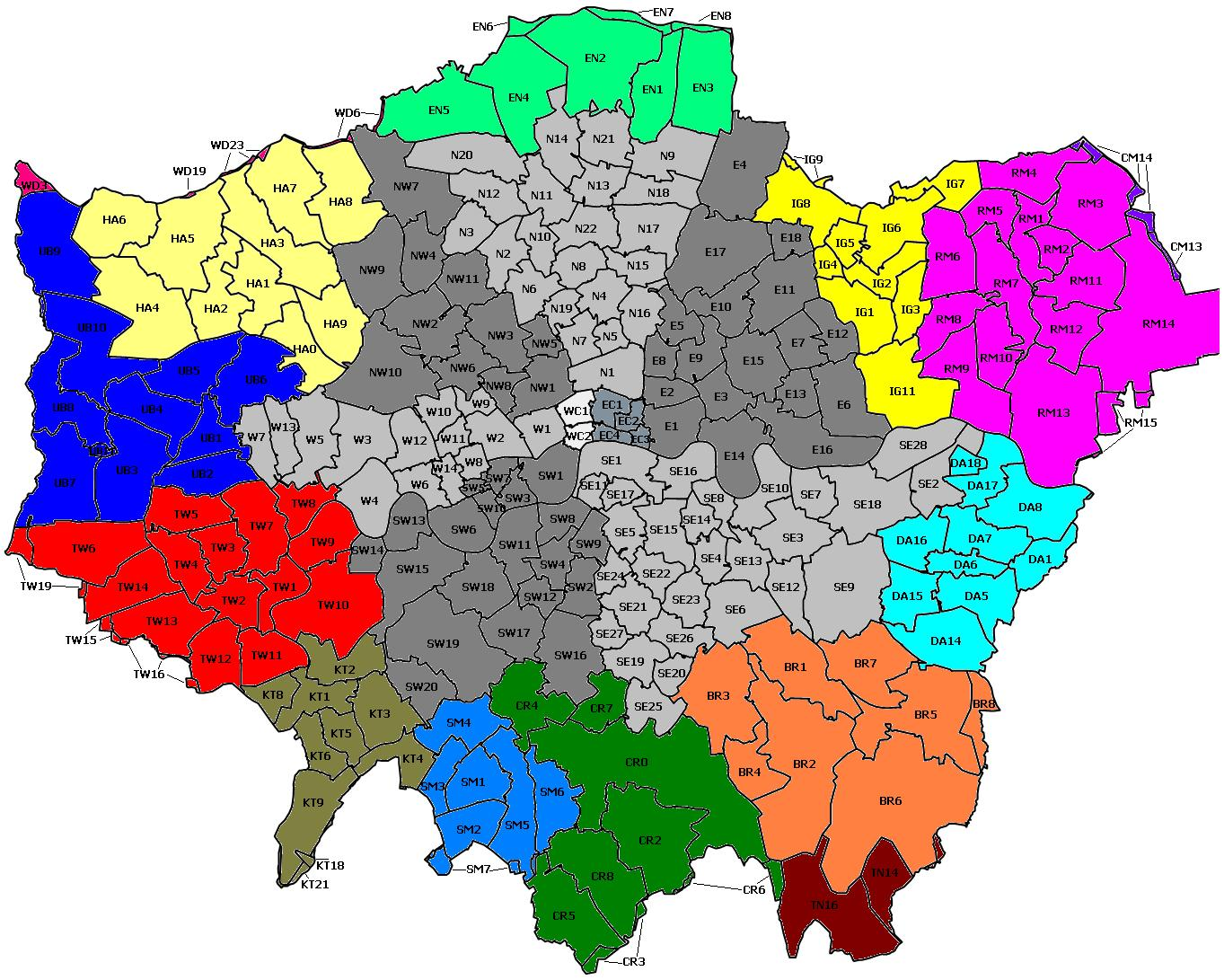
The "Northern" and other post code districts of Greater London.

The N (Northern) postcode area was introduced in 1857 to facilitate the distribution of mail. There is a Northern postal area, but this includes some areas not normally described as part of north London, while excluding many others that are.

=== North Thames: Boundary Commission report ===
In 2017, the government asked the Boundary Commission for England to reconsider the boundaries of parliamentary constituencies. The Commission's approach was to start with existing regions of England (in this case London) and then group the local authorities within that area into sub-regions for further sub-division.

The North Thames sub-region includes all parts of London lying north of the river; the 19 boroughs which lie wholly north of the river, plus parts of cross-river Richmond upon Thames.

An earlier 2013 study, whose recommendations were not adopted, took a different approach by assigning all of Richmond to the south. This list includes all boroughs included in the North Thames area:

London borough	Postcode areas	2011 sub-region	London Assembly
Barking and Dagenham	IG, RM, E	East	City and East
Barnet	EN, HA, N, NW	North	Barnet and Camden
Brent	HA, NW, W	West	Brent and Harrow
Camden	EC, WC, N, NW, W	Central	Barnet and Camden
Ealing	UB, W, NW	West	Ealing and Hillingdon
Enfield	EN, N	North	Enfield and Haringey
Hackney	E, EC, N	East	North East
Hammersmith & Fulham	SW, W, NW	West	West Central
Haringey	N	North	Enfield and Haringey
Harrow	HA, UB, NW	West	Brent and Harrow
Havering	RM, CM	East	Havering and Redbridge
Hillingdon	HA, TW, UB, WD	West	Ealing and Hillingdon
Hounslow	TW, W, UB	West	South West
Islington	EC, WC, N	Central	North East
Kensington and Chelsea	W, SW	Central	West Central
Newham	E	East	City and East
Redbridge	E, IG, RM	East	Havering and Redbridge
Waltham Forest	E, IG	East	North East
Westminster	NW, SW, WC, W	Central	West Central

=== North London Derby ===
Football in the region is dominated by Premier League teams Arsenal and Tottenham Hotspur. The two clubs contest the North London derby, which has been described as "one of the fiercest derbies in English football and one that separates families in north London."

The games in the Premier League (and formerly the Football League) are known formally as the North London derby. To date, 167 matches have been played with 66 wins for Arsenal, 54 wins for Spurs and 47 draws. In other matches, simply referred to generically as North London derbies, the 6 FA Cup contests resulted in 4 Arsenal victories to Spurs' 2 with no draws, while the 14 League Cup matches have ended with 7 wins for Arsenal against 4 for Spurs with 3 draws.

In the sole Charity Shield between the two clubs, then exclusively between the previous season's league champions and the FA Cup winners, the contest in 1991 was drawn with the Shield shared. Spurs had won the FA cup final in 1991 after beating Arsenal 3–1 in the semi-final, the first FA cup semi-final and the first of five North London derbies to be held at Wembley Stadium. The 1991 Charity Shield is the sole occasion so far in which a trophy has been at stake, though in 1971 (0–1) and 2004 (2–2) Arsenal were crowned league champions at the final whistle of the North London derby in Tottenham.

== Climate ==
North London has, like other parts of London and the UK in general, a temperate maritime climate according to the Köppen climate classification system. Long term climate observations dating back to 1910 are available for Hampstead, which is also the most elevated Weather Station in the London area, at 137m. This both hilltop and urban position means severe frosts are rare.

Temperatures increase towards the Thames, firstly because of the urban warming effect of the surrounding area, but secondly due to altitude decreasing towards the river, meaning some of the hillier northern margins of North London are often a degree or so cooler than those areas adjacent to the Thames. Occasionally snow can be seen to lie towards the Chilterns while central London is snow-free.

Typically the warmest day of the year at Hampstead will average 29.3 °C (84.7 °F) with around 14 days in total achieving a value of 25.1 °C (77.2 °F) or higher.

The average coldest night should fall to −5.6 °C (21.9 °F). On average 35.8 nights will report an air frost, some 119 days of the year will register at least 1mm of precipitation, and on 7.4 days a cover of snow will be observed. All annual averages refer to the observation period 1971–2000.

Climate data for Hampstead 137m asl 1971–2000
Month	Jan	Feb	Mar	Apr	May	Jun	Jul	Aug	Sep	Oct	Nov	Dec	Year
Record high °C (°F)	15.7 (60.3)	18.3 (64.9)	23.1 (73.6)	26.6 (79.9)	29.8 (85.6)	33.7 (92.7)	34.4 (93.9)	37.4 (99.3)	29.4 (84.9)	28.3 (82.9)	17.9 (64.2)	15.3 (59.5)	37.4 (99.3)
Mean daily maximum °C (°F)	6.8 (44.2)	7.3 (45.1)	10.1 (50.2)	12.6 (54.7)	16.4 (61.5)	19.2 (66.6)	22.0 (71.6)	21.6 (70.9)	18.2 (64.8)	14.1 (57.4)	9.7 (49.5)	7.7 (45.9)	13.8 (56.8)
Mean daily minimum °C (°F)	1.6 (34.9)	1.4 (34.5)	3.1 (37.6)	4.3 (39.7)	7.4 (45.3)	10.4 (50.7)	12.8 (55.0)	12.8 (55.0)	10.6 (51.1)	7.5 (45.5)	4.0 (39.2)	2.5 (36.5)	6.5 (43.8)
Record low °C (°F)	−10.8 (12.6)	−12.2 (10.0)	−6.9 (19.6)	−3.2 (26.2)	−0.6 (30.9)	1.8 (35.2)	5.6 (42.1)	4.7 (40.5)	2.4 (36.3)	−2.4 (27.7)	−5.8 (21.6)	−8.4 (16.9)	−12.2 (10.0)
Average precipitation mm (inches)	64.72 (2.55)	39.91 (1.57)	52.71 (2.08)	53.53 (2.11)	59.48 (2.34)	58.07 (2.29)	44.11 (1.74)	59.66 (2.35)	63.38 (2.50)	71.43 (2.81)	60.26 (2.37)	64.29 (2.53)	691.55 (27.24)
Source: Royal Netherlands Meteorological Institute

== Associated organisations ==
- North London derby
- North London Central Mosque
- North London Collegiate School
- North London Lions
- North London Line
- North London Skolars
- New North London Synagogue
- University of North London

== Notable people ==
- Demis Hassabis (born 1976), AI researcher and CEO of Google DeepMind and Isomorphic Labs

== See also ==
- Central London
- East London
- Inner London
- Outer London
- South London
- West London
