= London postal district =

Post town in England

London
- Post town
- Postcode areas: E; EC; N; NW; SE; SW; W; WC

Area
  - Total: 620 km^{2} (241 sq mi)

The London postal district is the area in England of 241 square miles (620 km^{2}) to which mail addressed to the London post town is delivered. The General Post Office under the control of the Postmaster General directed Sir Rowland Hill to devise the area in 1856 and throughout its history it has been subject to reorganisation and division into increasingly smaller postal units, with the early loss of two compass points and a minor retraction in 1866. It was integrated by the Post Office into the national postcode system of the United Kingdom during the early 1970s and corresponds to the E, EC, N, NW, SE, SW, W and WC postcode areas. The postal district has also been known as the London postal area. The County of London was much smaller, at 117 square miles (300 km^{2}), but Greater London is much larger at 607 square miles (1,570 km^{2}).

== History ==
=== Origins ===
Map of the original London postal district in 1857

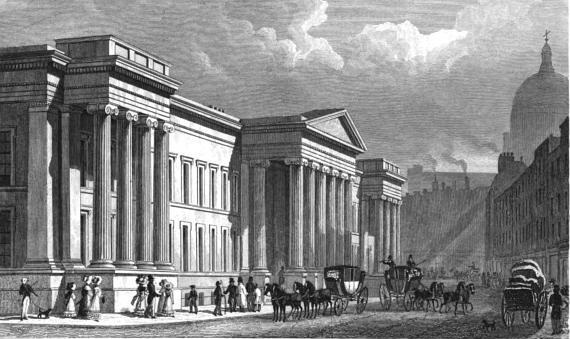
The Post Office in St. Martin's Le Grand

By the 1850s, the rapid growth of the metropolitan area meant it became too large to operate efficiently as a single post town. A Post Office inquiry into the problem had been set up in 1837 and a House of Commons committee was initiated in 1843. In 1854 Charles Canning, the Postmaster General, set up a committee at the Post Office in St. Martin's Le Grand to investigate how London could best be divided for the purposes of directing mail. In 1856, of the 470 million items of mail sent in the United Kingdom during the year, approximately one fifth (100 million) were for delivery in London and half of these (50 million items) also originated there.

The General Post Office under the control of the Postmaster General devised the area in 1856. Sir Rowland Hill produced a roughly circular area of 12 miles (19 km) radius from the central post office at St. Martin's Le Grand in central London. As originally devised, it extended from Waltham Cross in the north to Carshalton in the south and from Romford in the east to Sunbury in the west — six counties at the time if including the City of London. The postal district was divided into two central areas and eight compass points which operated much like separate post towns. Each was named "London" with a suffix (EC, WC, N, NE, E, SE, S, SW, W, and NW) indicating the area it covered; each had a separate head office. The system was introduced during 1857 and completed on 1 January 1858.

=== Abolition of NE and S divisions and retraction of E division ===
During the 1860s, following an official report by Anthony Trollope, the NE and S divisions were removed from the scheme. In 1866, NE was abolished; large districts transferred to E included Walthamstow, Wanstead and Leytonstone. The eight remaining letter prefixes (excluding all numbers) were not changed. In 1868 the S district was abolished and split between SE and SW.

At the same time, the London postal district boundary was retracted in the east, when some Essex areas, including around Ilford, became part of other postal towns.

The NE and S code letters are since reused for the national postcode system, with the NE postcode area covering Newcastle upon Tyne, and the S postcode area covering Sheffield.

=== Numbered divisions ===
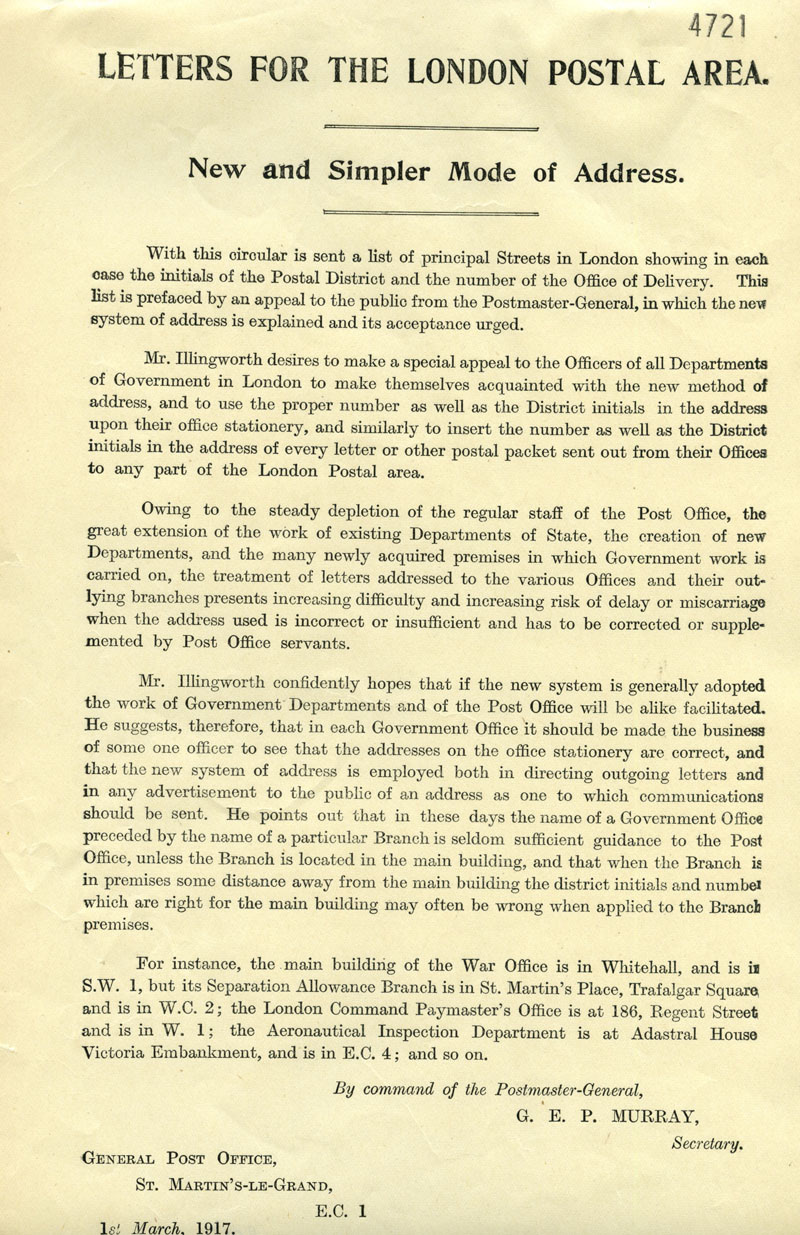
Post Office Notice re introduction of number codes dated 1 March 1917

In 1917, as a wartime measure to improve efficiency, the districts were further subdivided with a number applied to each sub-district. This was achieved by designating a sub-area served most conveniently by the head office in each district "1" and then allocating the rest alphabetically by the name of the location of each delivery office. Exceptionally, W2 and SW11 are also 'head districts'.

The boundaries of each sub-district rarely correspond to any units of civil administration: the parishes and hamlets/chapelries with chapels that traditionally define settlement names everywhere in England and Wales or the generally larger boroughs; despite this, postal sub-districts have developed over time into a primary reference frame. The numbered sub-districts became the "outward code" (first half) of the postcode system as expanded into longer codes during the 1970s.

==== Changes ====
Ad hoc changes have taken place to the organisation of the districts, such as the creation of SE28 from existing districts because of the construction of the high-density Thamesmead development.

=== High-density districts ===
==== Subdivisions of postcode sub-districts ====
Owing to heavier demand, seven high-density postcode districts in central London have been subdivided to create new, smaller postcode districts. This is achieved by adding a letter after the original postcode district, for example W1P. Where such sub-districts are used elsewhere such as on street signs and maps, the original unsuffixed catch-all versions often remain in use instead. The districts subdivided are E1, N1, EC (EC1, EC2, EC3, EC4), SW1, W1, WC1 and WC2 (each with several subdivisions). Similarly, there are solely non-geographic suffixed sub-districts for PO boxes in NW1 (e.g. NW1W) and SE1 (e.g. SE1P).

=== Relationship to London boundary ===
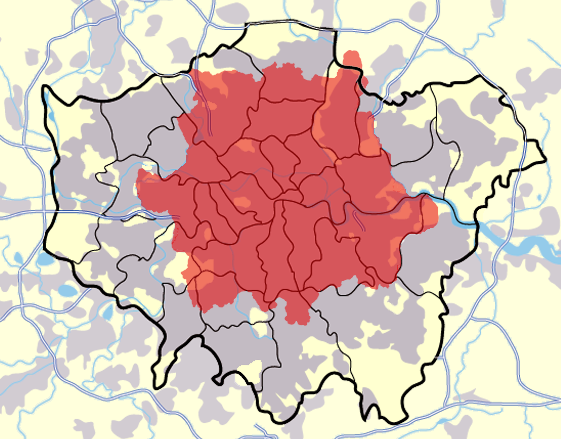
Greater London split into the London boroughs superimposed with the London postal district (red)

The London postal district has never been aligned with the London boundary. When the initial system was designed, the London boundary was restricted to the square mile of the small, ancient City of London. The wider metropolitan postal area covered parts of Middlesex, Surrey, Kent, Essex and Hertfordshire.

In 1889 a County of London, which was smaller than the postal district, was created from parts of Middlesex, Surrey and Kent. The bulk of 40 fringe sub-districts (having been numbered in 1917) lay outside its boundary including, for example: Leyton, Ealing, Totteridge and Wimbledon

In 1965 the creation of Greater London boundary went beyond these postal districts except for part of the parish of Waltham Holy Cross. The General Post Office was unwilling to follow this change and expand the postal district to match because of the cost. Places in London's outer boroughs such as Harrow, Barnet, Wembley, Enfield, Ilford, Romford, Bexleyheath, Bromley, Hounslow, Richmond, Croydon, Sutton, Kingston and Uxbridge are therefore covered by parts of twelve adjoining postcode areas (EN, IG, RM, DA, BR, TN, CR, SM, KT, TW, HA and UB) from postal districts of five different counties including Middlesex whose county council was abolished upon the creation of the Greater London Council.

Royal Mail has a seemingly settled policy of changing postcodes only if there is an operational advantage to doing so, unlike the postal services of other countries, and so has no plan to change the postcode system to correlate with the Greater London boundary. In 2003 the then Mayor of London expressed support for revision of postal addresses in Greater London. Similarly, organisations on the fringes of the London postal district have lobbied to be excluded or included in an attempt to decrease their insurance premiums (SE2→DA7) or raise the prestige of their business (IG1-IG6→E19). This is generally futile as Royal Mail changes postcodes only in order to facilitate the delivery of post, and not to illustrate geographical boundaries like the postal services of other countries.

The London postal district includes all of the City of London, Camden, Hackney, Hammersmith and Fulham, Haringey, Islington, Kensington and Chelsea, Southwark, Tower Hamlets, Wandsworth and Westminster. Almost entirely included are Greenwich, Lambeth, Lewisham, Newham and Waltham Forest, except for a few streets. Barking and Dagenham, Barnet, Bexley, Brent, Bromley, Croydon, Ealing, Enfield, Harrow, Hounslow, Kingston upon Thames, Merton, Redbridge, and Richmond upon Thames are partly in the postal district. Havering, Hillingdon and Sutton are completely outside the postal district. Sewardstone, in postal district E4 and in the Epping Forest District of Essex is anomalously the only place to be outside Greater London but in the London postal area.

Under early abandoned price differentials it formed the inner area of the London postal region, one now obscure definition of Inner London — the term has however lost economic significance from the consumer viewpoint with the standardisation of Royal Mail pricing.

=== Significance ===
It is common to use postal sub-districts as placenames in London, particularly in the property market: a property may be described as being "in N11", especially where this can be synonymous with a desirable location but also covers other less prestigious places. Thus sub-districts are a convenient shorthand indicator towards social status, such that a 'desirable' postcode may add significantly to the value of property, and property developers have tried to no avail to have Royal Mail alter the boundaries of postal districts so that new developments will sound as though they are in a richer area, whether in capital, personal income or both.

Parliament, which first established the London postal district, then created the narrower County of London (1889–1965) and replaced it with the much larger Greater London. However, there has been very little change in London postal district boundaries. Being in a London postcode inaccurately gives a broad definition of Inner London.

=== Presentation ===
All London postal districts were traditionally prefixed with the post town 'LONDON' and full stops were commonly placed after each character, e.g. LONDON S.W.1. Use of the full stops ended with the implementation of the national postcode system. In addition, integration of the London postal districts into postcodes means that, as postcodes should be on a separate address line (in line with other postcodes in the national system), the postal district should not now appear after 'LONDON' on the same line, but as the first part of the full postcode.

The presentation of the postal districts on street signs in London is commonplace, although not universal as each borough is individually responsible for street signs. Current regulations date from 1952; they were originally for the County of London, but were extended to Greater London in 1965. The section relating to postal districts reads "The appropriate postal district shall be indicated in the nameplate in signal red".

== List of London postal districts ==
List of London postal districts and their postcode districts
Postcode area	District	Postcode district	Postcode district name
E	Eastern	E1	Head district
E	Eastern	E2	Bethnal Green
E	Eastern	E3	Bow
E	Eastern	E4	Chingford
E	Eastern	E5	Clapton
E	Eastern	E6	East Ham
E	Eastern	E7	Forest Gate
E	Eastern	E8	Hackney
E	Eastern	E9	Homerton
E	Eastern	E10	Leyton
E	Eastern	E11	Leytonstone
E	Eastern	E12	Manor Park
E	Eastern	E13	Plaistow
E	Eastern	E14	Poplar
E	Eastern	E15	Stratford
E	Eastern	E16	Victoria Docks and North Woolwich
E	Eastern	E17	Walthamstow
E	Eastern	E18	Woodford and South Woodford
E	Eastern	E20	Olympic Park
EC	Eastern Central	EC1	Head district
EC	Eastern Central	EC2	Bishopsgate
EC	Eastern Central	EC3	Fenchurch Street
EC	Eastern Central	EC4	Fleet Street
N	Northern	N1	Head district
N	Northern	N2	East Finchley
N	Northern	N3	Finchley
N	Northern	N4	Finsbury Park
N	Northern	N5	Highbury
N	Northern	N6	Highgate
N	Northern	N7	Holloway
N	Northern	N8	Hornsey
N	Northern	N9	Lower Edmonton
N	Northern	N10	Muswell Hill
N	Northern	N11	New Southgate
N	Northern	N12	North Finchley
N	Northern	N13	Palmers Green
N	Northern	N14	Southgate
N	Northern	N15	South Tottenham
N	Northern	N16	Stoke Newington
N	Northern	N17	Tottenham
N	Northern	N18	Upper Edmonton
N	Northern	N19	Upper Holloway
N	Northern	N20	Whetstone
N	Northern	N21	Winchmore Hill
N	Northern	N22	Wood Green
NW	North Western	NW1	Head district
NW	North Western	NW2	Cricklewood
NW	North Western	NW3	Hampstead
NW	North Western	NW4	Hendon
NW	North Western	NW5	Kentish Town
NW	North Western	NW6	Kilburn
NW	North Western	NW7	Mill Hill
NW	North Western	NW8	St John's Wood
NW	North Western	NW9	The Hyde
NW	North Western	NW10	Willesden
NW	North Western	NW11	Golders Green
SE	South Eastern	SE1	Head district
SE	South Eastern	SE2	Abbey Wood
SE	South Eastern	SE3	Blackheath
SE	South Eastern	SE4	Brockley
SE	South Eastern	SE5	Camberwell
SE	South Eastern	SE6	Catford
SE	South Eastern	SE7	Charlton
SE	South Eastern	SE8	Deptford
SE	South Eastern	SE9	Eltham
SE	South Eastern	SE10	Greenwich
SE	South Eastern	SE11	Kennington
SE	South Eastern	SE12	Lee
SE	South Eastern	SE13	Lewisham
SE	South Eastern	SE14	New Cross
SE	South Eastern	SE15	Peckham
SE	South Eastern	SE16	Rotherhithe
SE	South Eastern	SE17	Walworth
SE	South Eastern	SE18	Woolwich
SE	South Eastern	SE19	Norwood
SE	South Eastern	SE20	Anerley
SE	South Eastern	SE21	Dulwich
SE	South Eastern	SE22	East Dulwich
SE	South Eastern	SE23	Forest Hill
SE	South Eastern	SE24	Herne Hill
SE	South Eastern	SE25	South Norwood
SE	South Eastern	SE26	Sydenham
SE	South Eastern	SE27	West Norwood
SE	South Eastern	SE28	Thamesmead
SW	South Western	SW1	Head district
SW	South Western	SW2	Brixton
SW	South Western	SW3	Chelsea
SW	South Western	SW4	Clapham
SW	South Western	SW5	Earls Court
SW	South Western	SW6	Fulham
SW	South Western	SW7	South Kensington
SW	South Western	SW8	South Lambeth
SW	South Western	SW9	Stockwell
SW	South Western	SW10	West Brompton
SW	Battersea	SW11	Head district
SW	Battersea	SW12	Balham
SW	Battersea	SW13	Barnes
SW	Battersea	SW14	Mortlake
SW	Battersea	SW15	Putney
SW	Battersea	SW16	Streatham
SW	Battersea	SW17	Tooting
SW	Battersea	SW18	Wandsworth
SW	Battersea	SW19	Wimbledon
SW	Battersea	SW20	West Wimbledon
W	Western	W1	Head district
W	Paddington	W2	Head district
W	Paddington	W3	Acton
W	Paddington	W4	Chiswick
W	Paddington	W5	Ealing
W	Paddington	W6	Hammersmith
W	Paddington	W7	Hanwell
W	Paddington	W8	Kensington
W	Paddington	W9	Maida Hill
W	Paddington	W10	North Kensington
W	Paddington	W11	Notting Hill
W	Paddington	W12	Shepherds Bush
W	Paddington	W13	West Ealing
W	Paddington	W14	West Kensington
WC	Western Central	WC1	Head district
WC	Western Central	WC2	Strand

== Map ==
LONDON post town map, showing postcode districts in red and the single post town in grey text for E, EC, N, NW, SE, SW, W and WC London postcode areas, with links to nearby BR, CM, CR, DA, EN, HA, IG, KT, RM, SM, TW, UB and WD postcode areas.

Detailed map of postcode districts in central London

The area covered is 241 square miles (620 km^{2}).

== London postal region ==
The E, EC, N, NW, SE, SW, W and WC postcode areas (the eight London postal districts) comprise the inner area of the London postal region and correspond to the London post town.

The BR, CM, CR, DA, EN, HA, IG, SL, TN, KT, RM, SM, TW, UB, and WD (the 15 outer London postcode areas) comprise the outer area of the London postal region.

The inner and outer areas together comprise the London postal region.
