= List of postcode areas in the United Kingdom =

This is a list of postcode areas, used by Royal Mail for the purposes of directing mail within the United Kingdom. The postcode area is the largest geographical unit used and forms the initial characters of the alphanumeric UK postcode. There are currently 121 geographic postcode areas in use in the UK and a further three often combined with these covering the Crown Dependencies of Guernsey, Jersey and Isle of Man.

== Subdivision ==
Each postcode area is further divided into post towns and postcode districts. There are on average 20 postcode districts to a postcode area, with ZE having the lowest (3) and BT the highest (81). The London post town is instead divided into several postcode areas.

== Scope ==
The single or pair of letters chosen for postcode areas are generally intended as a mnemonic for the places served. Postcode areas, post towns and postcode districts do not follow political or local authority administrative boundaries and usually serve much larger areas than the place names with which they are associated. Many post towns are former "county towns" but postcode areas rarely align with the county (or successor authority) area. For example, within the PA postcode area the PA1 and PA78 postcode districts are 140 miles (225 km) apart, and cover 5 local authority areas; and the eight postcode areas of the London post town cover only 40% of Greater London. The remainder of its area is covered by sections of twelve adjoining postcode areas: EN, IG, RM, DA, BR, TN, CR, SM, KT, TW, HA and UB.

== United Kingdom postcode areas ==
Map of postcode areas in the United Kingdom and Crown dependencies, with links to each postcode area

Postcode area	Postcode area name	Code formation	Number of postcode districts within area
AB	Aberdeen	Aberdeen	33 (highest number 56)
AL	St Albans	St Albans	10
B	Birmingham	Birmingham	79 (highest number 98)
BA	Bath	Bath	19 (highest number 22)
BB	Blackburn	Blackburn	13 (highest number 18)
BD	Bradford	Bradford	24
BH	Bournemouth	Bournemouth	26 (highest number 31)
BL	Bolton	Bolton	10 (highest number 9)
BN	Brighton	Brighton	30 (highest number 45)
BR	Bromley	Bromley	8
BS	Bristol	Bristol	37 (highest number 49)
BT	Belfast	Belfast	81 (highest number 94)
CA	Carlisle	Carlisle	28
CB	Cambridge	Cambridge	16 (highest number 25)
CF	Cardiff	Cardiff	35 (highest number 83)
CH	Chester	Chester	37 (highest number 66)
CM	Chelmsford	Chelmsford	25 (highest number 77)
CO	Colchester	Colchester	16
CR	Croydon	Croydon	9 (highest number 8)
CT	Canterbury	Canterbury	21
CV	Coventry	Coventry	24 (highest number 47)
CW	Crewe	Crewe	12
DA	Dartford	Dartford	18
DD	Dundee	Dundee	11
DE	Derby	Derby	23 (highest number 75)
DG	Dumfries	Dumfries and Galloway	15 (highest number 16)
DH	Durham	Durham	9
DL	Darlington	Darlington	17
DN	Doncaster	Doncaster	32 (highest number 41)
DT	Dorchester	Dorchester	11
DY	Dudley	Dudley	14
E	East London	East (London)	20 (includes E1W)
EC	East Central London	East Central (London)	23 (EC is split into four, with EC1, EC2 and EC4 split -A, -M, -N, -R, -V & -Y and EC3 split -A, -M, -N, -R & -V; highest number 4/4Y)
EH	Edinburgh	Edinburgh	54 (highest number 55)
EN	Enfield	Enfield	11
EX	Exeter	Exeter	33 (highest number 39)
FK	Falkirk	Falkirk	21
FY	Blackpool	The Fylde	8
G	Glasgow	Glasgow	52 (highest number 84)
GL	Gloucester	Gloucester	27 (highest number 56)
GU	Guildford	Guildford	38 (highest number 52)
HA	Harrow	Harrow	10 (highest number 9)
HD	Huddersfield	Huddersfield	9
HG	Harrogate	Harrogate	5
HP	Hemel Hempstead	Hemel Hempstead	24 (highest number 27)
HR	Hereford	Hereford	9
HS	Hebrides	Hebrides	9
HU	Hull	Hull	20
HX	Halifax	Halifax	7
IG	Ilford	Ilford and Gants Hill	11
IP	Ipswich	Ipswich	33
IV	Inverness	Inverness	52 (highest number 63)
KA	Kilmarnock	Possibly Kilmarnock, or Kilmarnock and Ayr, or Kilmarnock and Arran	30
KT	Kingston upon Thames	Kingston upon Thames	24
KW	Kirkwall	Kirkwall	16 (highest number 17)
KY	Kirkcaldy	Kirkcaldy	16
L	Liverpool	Liverpool	40
LA	Lancaster	Lancaster	23
LD	Llandrindod Wells	Llandrindod Wells	8
LE	Leicester	Leicester	21 (highest number 67)
LL	Llandudno	Llandudno	67 (highest number 78)
LN	Lincoln	Lincoln	13
LS	Leeds	Leeds	29
LU	Luton	Luton	7
M	Manchester	Manchester	43 (highest number 90)
ME	Rochester	Medway	20
MK	Milton Keynes	Milton Keynes	26 (highest number 46)
ML	Motherwell	Motherwell	12
N	North London	North (London)	23 (includes N1C, highest number 22)
NE	Newcastle upon Tyne	Newcastle upon Tyne	61 (highest number 71)
NG	Nottingham	Nottingham	29 (highest number 34)
NN	Northampton	Northampton	19 (highest number 29)
NP	Newport	Newport	18 (highest number 44)
NR	Norwich	Norwich	35
NW	North West London	North West (London)	11
OL	Oldham	Oldham	16
OX	Oxford	Oxford	27 (highest number 49)
PA	Paisley	Paisley	67 (highest number 80)
PE	Peterborough	Peterborough	38
PH	Perth	Perth	43 (highest number 50)
PL	Plymouth	Plymouth	35
PO	Portsmouth	Portsmouth	34 (highest number 41)
PR	Preston	Preston	11 (highest number 26)
RG	Reading	Reading	30 (highest number 45)
RH	Redhill	Redhill	20
RM	Romford	Romford	20
S	Sheffield	Sheffield	45 (highest number 81)
SA	Swansea	Swansea	51 (highest number 73)
SE	South East London	South East (London)	28
SG	Stevenage	Stevenage	19
SK	Stockport	Stockport	19 (highest number 23)
SL	Slough	Slough	10 (highest number 9)
SM	Sutton	Possibly Sutton and Morden, the two post towns that are within the SM area	7
SN	Swindon	Swindon	18 (highest number 26)
SO	Southampton	Southampton	23 (highest number 53)
SP	Salisbury	Salisbury Plain	11
SR	Sunderland	Sunderland	8
SS	Southend-on-Sea	Southend-on-Sea	17
ST	Stoke-on-Trent	Stoke-on-Trent	21
SW	South West London	South West (London)	27 (SW1 is split into eight, -A, -E, -H, -P, -V, -W, -X & -Y; highest number 20)
SY	Shrewsbury	Shrewsbury	25
TA	Taunton	Taunton	24
TD	Galashiels	Tweeddale	15
TF	Telford	Telford	13
TN	Tunbridge Wells	Tunbridge Wells	40
TQ	Torquay	Torquay	14
TR	Truro	Truro	27
TS	Cleveland	Teesside	29
TW	Twickenham	Twickenham	20
UB	Southall	Uxbridge	11
W	West London	West (London)	26 (W1 is split into thirteen, -A to -D, -F to -H, -J, -K, -S to -U & -W; highest number 14)
WA	Warrington	Warrington	16
WC	West Central London	West Central (London)	14 (WC1 is split into eight, -A, -B, -E, -H, -N, -R, -V & -X; WC2 is split into six, -A, -B, -E, -H, -N & -R; highest number 2R)
WD	Watford	Watford	11 (highest number 25)
WF	Wakefield	Wakefield	17
WN	Wigan	Wigan	8
WR	Worcester	Worcester	15
WS	Walsall	Walsall	15
WV	Wolverhampton	Wolverhampton	16
YO	York	York	29 (highest number 62)
ZE	Lerwick	Zetland	3

== Crown dependencies ==
The Crown dependencies (which are not officially part of the United Kingdom) did not introduce postcodes until later, but use a similar coding scheme. They are separate postal authorities.

Postcode area	Postcode area name	Code Formation	Number of postcode districts within area
GY	Guernsey	Guernsey	10
JE	Jersey	Jersey	2 (highest number 3)
IM	Isle of Man	Isle of Man	9

== Defunct postcode areas ==
=== Glasgow ===
Glasgow, like London, was divided into compass districts: C, W, NW, N, E, SE, S, SW. When postcodes were introduced, these were mapped into the new G postcode: C1 became G1, W1 became G11, N1 became G21, E1 became G31, S1 became G41, SW1 became G51, and so on. As NW and SE had never been subdivided they became G20 and G40 respectively.

=== Norwich and Croydon ===
Norwich and Croydon were used for a postcode experiment in the late 1960s, which was replaced by the current system. The format was of the form NOR or CRO followed by two numbers and a letter, e.g. NOR 07A. They were later changed to CR0 (digit '0') and NR1.

=== Dublin, Ireland ===
When Ireland was a part of the United Kingdom of Great Britain and Ireland a postal district system was introduced in 1917 by the UK government. The letter D was assigned to Dublin. Upon the establishment of the Irish Free State and later, the Republic of Ireland, the Irish government retained the designation and today it forms part of the Eircode system, a postcode format slightly different from the UK format and identifying individual addresses. Since Irish independence, D has never been reassigned as a postcode area in the UK.

== Non-geographic postcodes ==
=== Types ===
Some postcode areas do not correspond to geographical areas. They can be - (a) postcode areas with no geographic link (for use by Large Volume Receivers ("bulk mail", with delivery options determined between the LVR and Royal Mail) and these can for general mail or specific functions (e.g. parcel returns; centralised scanning of mail); (b) non-geographic postcode districts or sectors contained within geographic postcode areas (for LVRs or PO Boxes); and (c) specific purpose postcodes.

Postcode area	Purpose
BF	British Forces Post Office
BX	National Non-geographic
GIR	Girobank (no longer operating)
XM	Letters to Father Christmas ("XMas")
XX	Parcel returns to LVRs; COVID-19 samples
aa91-aa95	Business Large Volume Receivers in a postcode district (but this number range is not universally applied, and has many exceptions)
aa96-aa99	Government Large Volume Receivers in a postcode district (but this number range is not universally applied, and has many exceptions)
aanP	PO Boxes, in some London postcode districts e.g. EC1P, N1P (but is not consistently applied)

=== Numbering of non-geographic postcode districts ===
For those within geographic postcode areas, the first two numbers can be any number though they are generally larger than the numbers allocated to geographic districts. Some fall within the range 91 to 99 (e.g. S98 for payments to MNBA Ltd; NE98 for Department for Work and Pensions, Central Office, Newcastle-upon-Tyne). However, there are many exceptions to this - e.g. American Express has the postcode area BN88; in Glasgow G58 1SB is allocated to National Savings, formerly National Savings Bank, as a mnemonic (SB, and with 58 looking like SB), though it is located in the G43 postcode district; and in Glasgow G70 is allocated to HMRC which is located in G67. Some are in fact geographic e.g. EH99 1SP for the Scottish Parliament in Edinburgh.

=== BF ===
The BF postcode area was introduced in 2012 to provide optional postcodes for British Forces Post Office addresses, for consistency with the layout of other UK addresses. It uses the national non-geographic post town "BFPO" and, as of 2012, the postcode district "BF1". Each BFPO number is assigned an inward code, which are grouped as: 0 - Germany, 1 - UK, 2 - Rest of Europe, 3 - Rest of World, 4 - Ships and Naval Parties, 5 - Rest of World, Operations and Exercises, 6 - Rest of World, Operations and Exercises.

=== BX ===
The non-geographic postcode area BX has been introduced for addresses which do not include a locality; this allows large organisations long-term flexibility as to where they receive their mail. This postcode area is used by Lloyds Banking Group (BX1 1LT), HSBC (BX8 0HB) and parts of HM Revenue and Customs like VAT (BX5 5AT) and Pay As You Earn (BX9 1AS). Lloyds Bank also use BX4. After splitting from Lloyds, TSB Bank uses BX4 7SB, the latter part of which, when written, looks similar to "TSB".

=== GIR ===
GIR 0AA is a postcode created for Girobank in Bootle. It remained in use by its successors when Girobank was taken over by Alliance & Leicester and subsequently by Santander UK.

=== XM ===
XM4 5HQ is a postcode created for letters sent to Santa Claus or Father Christmas, chosen due to its visual similarity to "XMAS HQ" (XM4 5HQ).

=== XX ===
The non-geographic postcode area XX is used by online retailers for returns by Royal Mail, and was used for COVID-19 test samples.

Retailer (or other user)	XX Postcodes
Adidas	XX40 4AA
Amazon	XX10 1DD (Scottish Distribution Centre); XX10 1ZZ (Yorkshire Distribution Centre); XX30 1FF (South West Distribution Centre); XX30 1AA (South West Distribution Centre); XX40 2PP (National Distribution Centre); XX50 1DD (Scottish Distribution Centre); XX50 9SS (Scottish Distribution Centre); XX60 1XX (Princess Royal Distribution Centre)
ASOS	XX10 1AA
Boohoo.com	XX10 1BB
BT Group	XX10 1BT; XX50 5NN (Scottish Distribution Centre)
John Lewis	XX10 1EE; XX40 1EE
Marks & Spencer	XX10 1SS
Very	XX20 1DD
Hotter Returns	XX20 1HH
musicMagpie	XX10 1FF; XX20 1BF; XX20 1FF
HP / Cycleon Retail Returns	XX40 1EH; XX40 2HH (toner cartridge recycling)
Nike	XX40 2HH
Zara	XX40 1EJ
Mango	XX40 1EN
Monsoon Accessorize	XX40 1EP
Boden	XX40 1EG
H&M	XX40 1HN
Cainiao (Alibaba Group)	XX40 1RR
Oasis	XX40 1YY
Shein	XX40 3SS
Sony / Cycleon returns	XX40 3WW
Temu	XX40 1ZZ
Sky	XX40 4UU
Biocentre (COVID-19 testing)	XX40 4FL
AstraZeneca (COVID-19 testing)	XX40 8AZ
Biocentre (COVID-19 testing) Scotland	XX50 5FL

== Overseas territories ==
Certain British Overseas Territories introduced single postal codes for their territory or major sub-sections of it. These are not UK postcodes, even though many are formatted in a similar fashion:

Territory	Postcode
Anguilla	AI-2640
Saint Helena, Ascension and Tristan da Cunha: Ascension Island Saint Helena Tristan da Cunha	ASCN 1ZZ; STHL 1ZZ; TDCU 1ZZ
British Indian Ocean Territory	BBND 1ZZ
British Antarctic Territory	BIQQ 1ZZ
Falkland Islands	FIQQ 1ZZ
Gibraltar	GX11 1AA
Pitcairn Islands	PCRN 1ZZ
South Georgia and the South Sandwich Islands	SIQQ 1ZZ
Turks and Caicos Islands	TKCA 1ZZ

Other overseas territories have introduced their own more extensive postcode systems:

Overseas Territory	Further information
Bermuda	Postal codes in Bermuda
Cayman Islands	Postal codes in the Cayman Islands
British Virgin Islands	Postal codes in the British Virgin Islands
Montserrat	Postal codes in Montserrat

Civilian residential and business addresses in Akrotiri and Dhekelia are served by Cyprus Postal Services and use Cypriot postal codes.

Mail to Overseas Territories is treated as international if posted in the UK.

== See also ==
- List of postcode areas in the United Kingdom by population
- List of postcode districts in the United Kingdom
- Postcodes in the United Kingdom
- List of Eircode routing areas in Ireland
