= London E20 =

London E20 may refer to:

- E20, the postcode district in the E postcode area of London for the site of the 2012 Olympics
- London E20 (EastEnders), a fictional London postal district in EastEnders
