= WD3 =

WD3 may refer to:

- WD3, a postcode in the WD postcode area, a group of eleven postcode districts in England
- Watch Dogs: Legion, the third installment in the Watch Dogs video game franchise
