= N postcode area =

Postcode area within the United Kingdom

London N
- Postcode area
- Coordinates: 51.586°N 0.113°W
- Country: United Kingdom
- Postcode area: N
- Postcode area name: London N
- Post towns: 1
- Postcode districts: 25
- Postcode sectors: 112
- Postcodes (live): 17,429
- Postcodes (total): 29,296
- Statistics as at May 2020

The N (Northern) postcode area, also known as the London N postcode area, is the part of the London post town covering part of North London, England. It is a group of 25 postcode districts which covers around 17,429 live postcodes.

The area covers parts of the London Boroughs of Hackney, Islington, Camden, Barnet, Haringey and Enfield.

== Postal administration ==
The postcode area originated in 1857 as the N district of London. In 1917 it was subdivided into 22 numbered districts. The Northern head district was designated as N1 and the rest of the numbering followed the alphabetical order of the other districts' main names. Most districts include local areas known by their own specific names (see table below). The official post town for all N postcodes is LONDON; district names do not form an essential part of postal addresses.

In 2010, a new N1C district was formed out of the far western part of the original N1 district, to accommodate redevelopment in Kings Cross Central. The N area also includes two non-geographic postcode districts: N1P for PO boxes in N1 or N1C; and N81 for ballot mailings to Electoral Reform Services in N8.

=== List of postcode districts ===
The approximate coverage of the postcode districts, with the historic postal district names shown in italics:

Postcode district	Post town	Coverage	Local authority area(s)
N1	London	Northern head district: Angel, Barnsbury (part), Canonbury, Kings Cross, Islington, Pentonville, De Beauvoir Town, Hoxton. Shoreditch (part)	Hackney, Islington, Camden
N1C	London	Kings Cross Central	Camden
N1P	London	PO boxes in N1 and N1C	non-geographic
N2	London	East Finchley district: East Finchley, Fortis Green, Hampstead Garden Suburb (part)	Barnet, Haringey
N3	London	Finchley district: Finchley, Church End, Finchley Central	Barnet
N4	London	Finsbury Park district: Finsbury Park, Manor House, Harringay (part), Stroud Green	Haringey, Islington, Hackney
N5	London	Highbury district: Highbury, Highbury Fields	Islington, Hackney
N6	London	Highgate district: Highgate, Hampstead Heath (part)	Camden, Haringey, Islington
N7	London	Holloway district: Holloway, Barnsbury (part), Finsbury Park (part), Islington (part), Tufnell Park (part)	Islington, Camden
N8	London	Hornsey district: Hornsey, Crouch End, Harringay (part)	Haringey, Islington
N9	London	Lower Edmonton district: Lower Edmonton, Edmonton (part)	Enfield
N10	London	Muswell Hill district: Muswell Hill, Friern Barnet (part)	Haringey, Barnet
N11	London	New Southgate district: New Southgate, Friern Barnet, Bounds Green, Arnos Grove (part)	Enfield, Barnet, Haringey
N12	London	North Finchley district: North Finchley, Woodside Park, Friern Barnet (part)	Barnet
N13	London	Palmers Green district: Palmers Green, Bowes Park (part)	Enfield
N14	London	Southgate district: Southgate, Oakwood, Arnos Grove (part)	Enfield, Barnet
N15	London	South Tottenham district: South Tottenham, Harringay (part), West Green, Seven Sisters	Haringey
N16	London	Stoke Newington district: Stoke Newington, Stamford Hill (part), Shacklewell, Dalston (part), Newington Green (part)	Islington, Hackney
N17	London	Tottenham district: Tottenham	Haringey
N18	London	Upper Edmonton district: Upper Edmonton, Edmonton (part)	Enfield
N19	London	Upper Holloway district: Upper Holloway, Archway, Tufnell Park (part)	Islington, Camden
N20	London	Whetstone district: Whetstone, Totteridge, Oakleigh Park	Barnet
N21	London	Winchmore Hill district: Winchmore Hill, Bush Hill (part), Grange Park, World's End (part)	Enfield
N22	London	Wood Green district: Wood Green, Turnpike Lane, Bowes Park (part)	Haringey, Enfield
N81	London	Electoral Reform Services	non-geographic

== Boundaries ==
Postcode district N1 is the nearest of N postcode districts to central London and the N2–N22 postcode districts to its north. The postcode area is roughly bounded by the River Lea to the east and the Inner Ring Road to the south. In the west, the boundary cuts through Hampstead Heath and follows the North Circular Road and Dollis Brook for short distances. The northern boundary cuts through several open spaces and follows the A110 road for a short distance. The postcode area maps to the London Borough of Haringey, most of the London Borough of Islington, the northwestern section of the London Borough of Hackney, many parts of the London Borough of Barnet, southern sections of the London Borough of Enfield, and small parts of the London Borough of Camden.

== Map ==
N postcode area map, showing postcode districts in red and post towns in grey text, with links to nearby E, EC, EN, NW, W and WC postcode areas.

== See also ==
- Postcode Address File
- List of postcode areas in the United Kingdom
- London postal district
