= NW postcode area =

Postcode area within the United Kingdom

London NW
- Postcode area
- Location within the United Kingdom
- Coordinates: 51.556°N 0.198°W
- Sovereign state: United Kingdom
- Postcode area: NW
- Postcode area name: London NW
- Post towns: 1
- Postcode districts: 13
- Postcode sectors: 81
- Postcodes (live): 13,895
- Postcodes (total): 25,552
- Statistics as at May 2020

The NW (North Western) postcode area, also known as the London NW postcode area, is a group of 13 postcode districts covering around 13,895 live postcodes within part of northwest London, England. It is the successor of the NW sector, originally created as part of the London postal district in 1856.

== Postal administration ==
London postal arrangements were refined in 1917 when all its postcode districts (seven radial, which are large, and two innermost, which are much smaller) became publicly sub-divided; these were named after the location of the delivery office in each district. As London is one post town, district names are deprecated, in favour of the post town LONDON to be written/typed.

Within each NW postcode district, PO boxes are allocated to a unique postcode sector, except for two districts which use all available sectors for ordinary addresses and therefore have their separate non-geographic districts: NW1W for PO boxes in NW1 and NW26 for PO boxes in NW10.

=== List of postcode districts ===
The approximate coverage of the postcode districts, with the historic postal district names shown in italics:

Postcode district	Post town	Coverage	Local authority area(s)
NW1	London	North Western head district: Marylebone (part), Euston, Regent's Park, Baker Street, Camden Town, Kentish Town (part) Somers Town, Primrose Hill (part) and Lisson Grove (part)	Camden, Westminster
NW1W	London	PO boxes in NW1	non-geographic
NW2	London	Cricklewood district: Cricklewood, Dollis Hill, Childs Hill, Golders Green (part), Brent Cross (part), Willesden (north), Neasden (north)	Barnet, Brent, Camden
NW3	London	Hampstead district: Hampstead, Belsize Park, Frognal, Childs Hill (east), South Hampstead (north), Swiss Cottage (east), Primrose Hill (north), Chalk Farm (west), Gospel Oak	Camden, Barnet
NW4	London	Hendon district: Hendon, Brent Cross (part)	Barnet
NW5	London	Kentish Town district: Kentish Town, Camden Town (part), Gospel Oak (part), Dartmouth Park, Chalk Farm (east), Tufnell Park (west)	Camden, Islington
NW6	London	Kilburn district: Kilburn, Brondesbury, West Hampstead, Queen's Park, Kensal Green (part), South Hampstead (south), Swiss Cottage (west)	Brent, Camden, Westminster
NW7	London	Mill Hill district: Mill Hill, Arkley (part), Edgware (part)	Barnet
NW8	London	St John's Wood district: St John's Wood, Primrose Hill (south), Marylebone (north), Lisson Grove (north)	Westminster, Camden
NW9	London	The Hyde district: The Hyde, Colindale (part), Kingsbury, West Hendon, Wembley Park (part), Queensbury (part)	Barnet, Brent, Harrow
NW10	London	Willesden district: Willesden, Harlesden, Kensal Green, Brent Park, College Park, Stonebridge, North Acton (part), West Twyford, Neasden (south), Old Oak Common, Park Royal (north), Queen's Park (part)	Brent, Ealing, Hammersmith and Fulham, Kensington and Chelsea
NW11	London	Golders Green district: Golders Green, Temple Fortune, Hampstead Garden Suburb (west), Hendon (part), Brent Cross (part)	Barnet
NW26	London	PO boxes in NW10	non-geographic

== Boundaries ==
Postcode district NW1 is central to London, with the NW2–11 postcode districts radiating outwards to the northwest. The boundaries of the area and its numbered districts have changed over time and are the result of the working requirements of Royal Mail. They are not tied to those of the local authority areas served; consequently a locality name might describe varying areas. The postcode area contains western parts of the London Borough of Barnet, large parts of London Boroughs of Brent and Camden with parts of the City of Westminster, Islington and those of Ealing, and very small parts of Hammersmith and Fulham, Harrow and Kensington & Chelsea. The NW7 district is a projection as far as Hertfordshire's near edge, which it mirrors or emulates briefly near Scratch Wood.

== In popular culture ==
In 2008, the ska band Madness released a single called "NW5", named after the postal district of the same name.

In 2012, the British author Zadie Smith released a book called NW, named after the postal district of the same name, where the novel is set. The novel was adapted into a 2016 television film by the BBC.

== Map ==
NW postcode area map, showing postcode districts in red and post towns in grey text, with links to nearby EN, HA, N, W, WC and WD postcode areas.

The remainder of northwest Greater London is covered by the HA, UB, part of the EN and a small section of the WD postcode areas.

== See also ==
- List of postcode areas in the United Kingdom
- London postal district
- Postcode Address File
