= GY postcode area =

Postcode area for Bailiwick of Guernsey

Guernsey
- Postcode area
- Coordinates: 49.466°N 2.546°W
- Sovereign state responsible: United Kingdom
- Crown Dependency: Guernsey
- Postcode area: GY
- Postcode area name: Guernsey
- Post towns: 1
- Postcode districts: 10
- Postcode sectors: 16
- Postcodes (live): 3,344
- Postcodes (total): 3,374
- Statistics as at May 2020

The GY postcode area, also known as Guernsey postcode area, its post town, is a group of 10 consecutive postal districts covering Guernsey, Alderney, Sark, Herm and the two inhabited lesser islets in that region of the Channel Islands. It was established in 1993 as an extension of the United Kingdom postcode system.

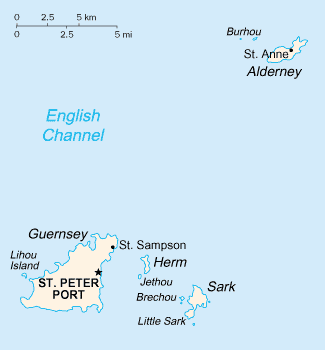
Map of the Bailiwick of Guernsey

== Coverage ==
The approximate coverage of the postal districts. The post town is GUERNSEY for all postcode districts

Postcode district	Sector(s)	Unit codes	Parish or island
GY1	1, 2, 3, 4, 6, 7		Saint Peter Port
GY1	3	HR	Herm in the above parish
GY1	4	AB	Jethou in the above parish
GY2	all		Saint Sampson
GY3	all		Vale
GY4	all		Saint Martin
GY5	all		Castel
GY6	8	AA – QZ	Vale
GY6	8	RA – ZZ	Saint Andrew
GY7	9		Saint Pierre du Bois
GY7	9		Saint Saviour
GY8	0	AA – JZ	Forest
GY8	0	KA – ZZ	Torteval
GY9	3		Alderney
GY10	1		Sark

Previously, both Alderney and Sark were covered by the GY9 district. In March 2009, Royal Mail had "agreed in principle" for the creation of the GY10 district which would cover all addresses on the island of Alderney, leaving just those of smaller Sark in GY9. This was intended to reduce the amount of mail being sent to the wrong island. The States of Alderney opposed doing it that way round, and instead Sark changed from sector GY9 0 to GY10 1 on 5 January 2011.

== See also ==
- Postcode Address File
- Guernsey Post
- List of postcode areas in the United Kingdom
- Jersey postcode area
