= EC postcode area =

Postcode area within the United Kingdom

London EC
- Postcode area
- Location within the United Kingdom
- Coordinates: 51.520°N 0.098°W
- Sovereign state: United Kingdom
- Postcode area: EC
- Postcode area name: London EC
- Post towns: 1
- Postcode districts: 30
- Postcode sectors: 140
- Postcodes (live): 3,698
- Postcodes (total): 12,546
- Statistics as at May 2020

The EC (Eastern Central) postcode area, also known as the London EC postcode area, is a group of postcode districts in central London, England. It includes almost all of the City of London and parts of the London boroughs of Islington, Camden, Hackney, Tower Hamlets and Westminster. The area covered is of very high density development. Deliveries for the EC postcode area are made from Mount Pleasant Mail Centre.

== Postal administration ==
The current postcode districts are relatively recent divisions of EC1, EC2, EC3 and EC4, which were established in 1917. When the districts are used for purposes other than the sorting of mail, such as a geographic, spoken reference and on street signs, they continue to be commonly grouped into those four 'districts'.

=== List of postcode districts ===
Postcode district	Post town	Coverage	Local authority area(s)
EC1A	London	St Bartholomew's Hospital	City of London, Islington
EC1M	London	Clerkenwell, Farringdon	Islington, Camden, City of London
EC1N	London	Hatton Garden	Camden, City of London
EC1P	London		non-geographic
EC1R	London	Finsbury, Finsbury Estate (west)	Islington, Camden
EC1V	London	Finsbury (east), Moorfields Eye Hospital	Islington, Hackney
EC1Y	London	St Luke's, Bunhill Fields Golden Lane Estate	Islington, City of London
EC2A	London	Shoreditch	Islington, Hackney, City of London
EC2M	London	Broadgate, Liverpool Street	City of London, Tower Hamlets
EC2N	London	Old Broad Street, Tower 42	City of London
EC2P	London		non-geographic
EC2R	London	Bank of England	City of London
EC2V	London	Guildhall	City of London
EC2Y	London	Barbican	City of London
EC3A	London	St Mary Axe, Aldgate	City of London
EC3M	London	Lloyd's of London, Fenchurch Street	City of London
EC3N	London	Tower Hill, Tower of London	Tower Hamlets, City of London
EC3P	London		non-geographic
EC3R	London	Monument, Billingsgate	City of London
EC3V	London	Cornhill, Gracechurch Street, Lombard Street	City of London
EC4A	London	Fetter Lane	City of London, Westminster
EC4M	London	St Paul's	City of London
EC4N	London	Mansion House	City of London
EC4P	London		non-geographic
EC4R	London	Cannon Street	City of London
EC4V	London	Blackfriars	City of London
EC4Y	London	Temple	City of London, Westminster
EC50	London		non-geographic

== Boundaries ==
=== EC1 ===
The EC1 postcode district (51.523°N 0.092°W) is roughly bounded by City Road to the northeast and east, Moorgate to the east, Chiswell Street and Newgate Street to the south, Rosebery Avenue to the northwest, and Gray's Inn Road to the west, where it borders WC postcode area. A long thin protrusion to the north east takes in all of Old Street. Taking in the districts of Clerkenwell, Finsbury and the northwestern part of the City of London from St Paul's Cathedral.

=== EC2 ===
The EC2 postcode district (51.518°N 0.084°W) is roughly bounded by Old Street to the north, Bishopsgate to the east, Cheapside, Poultry and Threadneedle Street to the south, and Aldersgate to the west. The postcode district includes Moorgate, Finsbury Circus and Liverpool Street and roughly covers the northeastern corner of the City of London from St Paul's Cathedral. To the north there are small sections in the London Borough of Islington and the London Borough of Hackney. Numbers 250-288 Bishopsgate (EC2M) fall within the London Borough of Tower Hamlets

=== EC3 ===
The EC3 postcode district (51.508°N 0.076°W) is roughly bounded by Minories and the Tower of London to the east, the River Thames to the south, London Bridge and Threadneedle Street to the west and Houndsditch to the north. It includes the Monument, Aldgate, Cornhill, Fenchurch Street, Gracechurch Street, Leadenhall Street, Lombard Street, Mincing Lane, Pudding Lane and Tower Hill and roughly covers the southeastern corner of the City of London. A small part is in the London Borough of Tower Hamlets, including the Tower of London.

=== EC4 ===
The EC4 postcode district (51.511°N 0.098°W) is roughly bounded by Cheapside to the north, London Bridge to the east, the River Thames to the south and Chancery Lane to the west. It roughly covers the southwestern corner of the City of London, including Fleet Street, Temple, Blackfriars, and St Paul's Cathedral. 6 postcodes in EC4 (2 in EC4A and 4 in EC4Y) fall within St. James's ward in Westminster.

== Map ==
EC postcode area map, showing postcode districts in red and post towns in grey text, with links to nearby E, N, SE and WC postcode areas.

== See also ==
- Postcode Address File
- List of postcode areas in the United Kingdom
- London postal district
