= RM postcode area =

Postcode area within the United Kingdom

Romford
- Postcode area
- Location within the United Kingdom
- Coordinates: 51.549°N 0.218°E
- Sovereign state: United Kingdom
- Postcode area: RM
- Postcode area name: Romford
- Post towns: 9
- Postcode districts: 21
- Postcode sectors: 71
- Postcodes (live): 9,852
- Postcodes (total): 15,144
- Statistics as at May 2020

The RM postcode area, also known as the Romford postcode area, is a group of twenty postcode districts in south-east England, within nine post towns. These cover parts of east London and southwest Essex. Inward mail for the area is sorted, along with mail for the E and IG postcode areas, at the Romford Mail Centre.

In east London, the area covers most of the London Borough of Havering (including Romford, Hornchurch, Rainham and Upminster), the eastern part of the London Borough of Barking and Dagenham (including Dagenham itself) and a small part of the London Borough of Redbridge. In Essex, the area covers most of the Thurrock unitary district (including Grays, Purfleet, South Ockendon and Tilbury), while RM4 covers small parts of the Epping Forest District and the Borough of Brentwood.

== Coverage ==
The approximate coverage of the postcode districts:

Postcode district	Post town	Coverage	Local authority area(s)
RM1	ROMFORD	Romford, Rise Park	Havering
RM2	ROMFORD	Gidea Park, Heath Park	Havering
RM3	ROMFORD	Harold Wood, Harold Hill, Noak Hill, Harold Park	Havering
RM4	ROMFORD	Havering-atte-Bower, Abridge, Stapleford Abbotts, Noak Hill, Navestock, Stapleford Tawney, Stapleford Aerodrome, Passingford Bridge	Havering, Epping Forest, Brentwood
RM5	ROMFORD	Collier Row	Havering, Redbridge
RM6	ROMFORD	Chadwell Heath, Marks Gate, Little Heath, Goodmayes (north), Hainault (South)	Barking and Dagenham, Redbridge, Havering
RM7	ROMFORD	Rush Green, Mawneys, Romford	Havering
RM8	DAGENHAM	Dagenham, Becontree, Becontree Heath, Chadwell Heath (south)	Barking and Dagenham, Redbridge
RM9	DAGENHAM	Dagenham, Becontree, Castle Green, Beam Park (west)	Barking and Dagenham, Redbridge, Havering
RM10	DAGENHAM	Dagenham, Becontree	Barking and Dagenham
RM11	HORNCHURCH	Hornchurch, Emerson Park, Ardleigh Green	Havering
RM12	HORNCHURCH	Hornchurch, Elm Park	Havering
RM13	RAINHAM	Rainham, South Hornchurch, Wennington, Hornchurch Marshes, Beam Park (east)	Havering
RM14	UPMINSTER	Upminster, Cranham, North Ockendon, Bulphan	Havering, Thurrock
RM15	SOUTH OCKENDON	South Ockendon, Aveley	Thurrock, Havering
RM16	GRAYS	Chafford Hundred, Chadwell St Mary, North Stifford, Orsett	Thurrock
RM17	GRAYS	Grays, Badgers Dene	Thurrock
RM18	TILBURY	Tilbury, East Tilbury, West Tilbury	Thurrock
RM19	PURFLEET	Purfleet	Thurrock
RM20	GRAYS	West Thurrock, South Stifford, Lakeside Shopping Centre	Thurrock

== Map ==
RM postcode area map, showing postcode districts in red and post towns in grey text, with links to nearby CM, DA, E, IG, ME, SE and SS postcode areas.

== See also ==
- Postcode Address File
- List of postcode areas in the United Kingdom
