= TW postcode area =

Postcode area within the United Kingdom

Twickenham
- Postcode area
- Location within the United Kingdom
- Coordinates: 51.447°N 0.393°W
- Sovereign state: United Kingdom
- Postcode area: TW
- Postcode area name: Twickenham
- Post towns: 13
- Postcode districts: 20
- Postcode sectors: 80
- Postcodes (live): 11,017
- Postcodes (total): 20,069
- Statistics as at May 2020

The TW postcode area, also known as the Twickenham postcode area, is a group of twenty postcode districts in south-east England, within thirteen post towns. These cover parts of south-west London and north-west Surrey, plus a very small part of Berkshire.

Mail for this area is sorted at the Jubilee Mail Centre, Hounslow, (Note: Mail was previously sorted at Rugby Road, Twickenham.) and the area served includes most of the London Boroughs of Richmond upon Thames and Hounslow, the southernmost part of the London Borough of Hillingdon (including Heathrow Airport) and very small parts of the Royal Borough of Kingston upon Thames. In Surrey it covers virtually all of the borough of Spelthorne, the northern part of the borough of Runnymede and very small parts of the borough of Elmbridge, and in Berkshire it covers the village of Wraysbury in the Royal Borough of Windsor and Maidenhead.

== Coverage ==
The coverage of the postcode districts, naming all localities (Note: In accordance with WP:UKTOWNS and WP:UKVILLAGES naming settlements with individual articles, excluding sub-neighbourhoods of estates contained in those towns.) :

Postcode district	Post town	Coverage	Local authority area(s)
TW1	TWICKENHAM	Twickenham, St. Margarets, Strawberry Hill (east)	Richmond upon Thames, Hounslow
TW2	TWICKENHAM	Twickenham (west) (Note: Twickenham Green and Heathfield, neighbourhoods of Twickenham, are in TW2.), Whitton, Strawberry Hill (west), Fulwell (north)	Richmond upon Thames
TW3	HOUNSLOW	Hounslow, Lampton, Whitton (north)	Hounslow, Richmond upon Thames
TW4	HOUNSLOW	Hounslow West, Hounslow Heath, Whitton (west), Cranford (south), Hanworth (part)	Hounslow, Richmond upon Thames
TW5	HOUNSLOW	Heston, Cranford (north), Osterley (west)	Hounslow
TW6	HOUNSLOW	Heathrow Airport	Hillingdon
TW7	ISLEWORTH	Isleworth, Osterley (east and centre), Whitton (north-east)	Hounslow, Richmond upon Thames
TW8	BRENTFORD	Brentford, Kew Bridge, Syon Park, Brentford Ait	Hounslow, Richmond upon Thames (Note: Brentford Ait, which is uninhabited, is in the London Borough of Richmond upon Thames.)
TW9	RICHMOND	Richmond, Kew, North Sheen (north)	Richmond upon Thames
TW10	RICHMOND	Ham, Petersham, Richmond Hill, North Sheen (south), Richmond Park	Richmond upon Thames, Kingston upon Thames (Note: A small part of Ham, in TW10, is in the Royal Borough of Kingston upon Thames.)
TW11	TEDDINGTON	Teddington, Fulwell (east), Bushy Park	Richmond upon Thames
TW12	HAMPTON	Hampton, Hampton Hill, Fulwell (west)	Richmond upon Thames
TW13	FELTHAM	Feltham (south of the railway line), Hanworth, Butts Farm	Hounslow
TW14	FELTHAM	Feltham (north of the railway line), North Feltham, East Bedfont, Hatton	Hounslow, Hillingdon
TW15	ASHFORD	Ashford	Spelthorne, London Borough of Hounslow.
TW16	SUNBURY-ON-THAMES	Sunbury-on-Thames	Spelthorne, Elmbridge (Note: Large residential island Wheatley's Ait, in TW16, is mostly in Elmbridge.), Hounslow (Note: A café in a layby on the A316 is in the London Borough of Hounslow.), Richmond upon Thames (Note: Ten riverside houses in TW16 are in the London Borough of Richmond upon Thames.)
TW17	SHEPPERTON	Shepperton, Upper Halliford, Charlton, Littleton	Spelthorne, Elmbridge (Note: Part of residential island Shepperton Lock Island, in TW17, is in Elmbridge.)
TW18	STAINES-UPON-THAMES	Staines-upon-Thames, Egham Hythe, Laleham	Spelthorne, Runnymede, Windsor and Maidenhead
TW19	STAINES-UPON-THAMES	Stanwell, Stanwell Moor, Wraysbury, Sunnymeads, Hythe End	Spelthorne, Windsor and Maidenhead
TW20	EGHAM	Egham, Englefield Green, Thorpe	Runnymede

== Map ==
TW postcode area map, showing postcode districts in red and post towns in grey text, with links to nearby GU, KT, SL, SW, UB and W postcode areas.

== See also ==
- Postcode Address File
- List of postcode areas in the United Kingdom
