= WC postcode area =

Postcode area within the United Kingdom

London WC
- Postcode area
- Location within the United Kingdom
- Coordinates: 51.518°N 0.122°W
- Sovereign state: United Kingdom
- Postcode area: WC
- Postcode area name: London WC
- Post towns: 1
- Postcode districts: 15
- Postcode sectors: 46
- Postcodes (live): 2,610
- Postcodes (total): 7,424
- Statistics as at May 2020

The WC (Western Central) postcode area, also known as the London WC postcode area, is a group of postcode districts in central London, England. The area covered is of high density development, and includes parts of the City of Westminster and the London Boroughs of Camden and Islington, plus a very small part of the City of London.

The WC1 and WC2 postcode districts are relatively recent, having been established in 1917. When the districts are used for purposes other than the sorting of mail, such as for geographic reference and on street signs, their subdivisions - featuring letter suffixes - are often omitted.

== Postal administration ==
WC1 and WC2 postcode districts are part of the London post town. Until created in 1917 they comprised the WC postal district. There are no postally-recognised localities used in them. No great recoding in this postcode area took place from 1990 to 2007.

Post Offices in WC1 are at Grays Inn, Marchmont Street, Southampton Row, at High Holborn and nearby parallel New Oxford Street and in the other clustered at Aldwych and Strand. The Western Central District Office was on New Oxford Street, a stop on the underground London Post Office Railway. Deliveries for the area come from Mount Pleasant Mail Centre, west of Farringdon Road.

=== List of postcode districts ===
The postcode districts are, with approximate coverage:

Postcode district	Post town	Coverage	Local authority area(s)
WC1A	London	New Oxford Street	Camden
WC1B	London	Bloomsbury, British Museum, Southampton Row	Camden
WC1E	London	Birkbeck College, University College London, SOAS	Camden
WC1H	London	St Pancras, UCL Institute of Education	Camden
WC1N	London	Russell Square, Great Ormond Street	Camden
WC1R	London	Gray's Inn	Camden
WC1V	London	High Holborn	Camden, City of London
WC1X	London	Kings Cross, Finsbury (west), Clerkenwell (north)	Camden, Islington
WC2A	London	Lincoln's Inn Fields, Royal Courts of Justice, Chancery Lane	Camden, Westminster, City of London
WC2B	London	Drury Lane, Kingsway, Aldwych	Camden, Westminster
WC2E	London	Covent Garden	Westminster
WC2H	London	Leicester Square, St. Giles	Camden, Westminster
WC2N	London	Charing Cross	Westminster
WC2R	London	Somerset House, Temple (west)	Westminster

== Boundaries ==
=== WC1 ===
The WC1 postcode district (51.514°N 0.120°W) is roughly bounded by Amwell Street, Rosebery Avenue and Gray's Inn Road to the east; New Oxford Street and High Holborn to the south (the boundary with WC2); Tottenham Court Road to the west; and Euston Road and Pentonville Road to the north, and approximately corresponds to the modern district of Bloomsbury, with parts of Holborn, King's Cross and St Pancras. It includes Russell Square, Tavistock Square and Coram's Fields. It is mostly within the London Borough of Camden, although a small part towards the east is within the London Borough of Islington. It includes the British Museum and buildings owned by the federal University of London and its constituent colleges and institutes.

=== WC2 ===
The WC2 postcode district (51.514°N 0.124°W) is roughly bounded by Chancery Lane and Essex Street to the east, High Holborn and New Oxford Street to the north (the boundary with WC1), Wardour Street and Whitcomb Street to the west and Northumberland Avenue and the River Thames to the south. It includes Leicester Square, Trafalgar Square and the Aldwych. It corresponds roughly to the former district of Strand. It is mostly within the City of Westminster with the northern section in the London Borough of Camden and some small areas in the east in the City of London. It includes Somerset House, colleges of the University of London like King's College London (Strand campus), and the National Portrait Gallery.

== Map ==
WC postcode area map, showing postcode districts in red and post towns in grey text, with links to nearby EC, N, NW, SE, SW and W postcode areas.

== See also ==
- Postcode Address File
- List of postcode areas in the United Kingdom
- London postal district
- Central London
- West End of London
