= CR postcode area =

Postcode area within the United Kingdom

Croydon
- Postcode area
- Coordinates: 51.356°N 0.099°W
- Country: United Kingdom
- Postcode area: CR
- Postcode area name: Croydon
- Post towns: 10
- Postcode districts: 11
- Postcode sectors: 66
- Postcodes (live): 7,906
- Postcodes (total): 14,632
- Statistics as at May 2020

The CR postcode area, also known as the Croydon postcode area, is a group of eight postcode districts in England, within ten post towns. These cover parts of southern Greater London and north-east Surrey.

The main sorting office is in Croydon, and the area served includes most of the London Borough of Croydon, as well as adjacent parts of Merton, Sutton and Bromley. Most of CR3 and CR6 cover the northern part of the Surrey borough of Tandridge , and a part of CR5 covers the northern part of the Surrey borough of Reigate and Banstead.

Croydon was the second town, after Norwich, to have experimental postcodes, introduced in 1966. This trialled the postcode area CRO (letter 'O'), while Norwich used NOR for its equivalent. It was decided that the outward (first) part of a postcode should be alphanumerical, so CRO became CR0 (with a zero) and NOR became NR1. The CR1 postcode has not been introduced, making CR the only postcode area with a district 0 but not a district 1.

Originally there were only the districts CR0, CR2, CR3 and CR4 - in the 1990s CR5 was split from CR2, CR6 and CR8 were split from CR3, and CR7 from CR4.

The CR0 postcode district covers the largest population in the UK.

== Coverage ==
The approximate coverage of the postcode districts:

Postcode district	Post town	Coverage	Local authority area(s)
CR0	CROYDON	Croydon, Addiscombe, Woodside (part), Selhurst, Broad Green, Spring Park, Shirley, Addington, New Addington, Coombe, Forestdale, Waddon, Beddington, Thornton Heath (part), Valley Retail and Leisure Park, Mitcham Common (part)	Croydon, Merton, Sutton
CR2	SOUTH CROYDON	South Croydon, Sanderstead, Selsdon, Forestdale, part of Addington	Croydon
CR3	CATERHAM	Caterham, Chaldon, Woldingham	Croydon, Tandridge
CR3	WHYTELEAFE	Whyteleafe	Croydon, Tandridge
CR4	MITCHAM	Mitcham, Mitcham Common, Pollards Hill (part), Eastfields (part)	Croydon, Merton, Sutton
CR5	COULSDON	Coulsdon, Old Coulsdon, Chipstead, Hooley, Netherne-on-the-Hill, part of Woodmansterne, Clockhouse, part of Little Woodcote	Croydon, Reigate and Banstead, Sutton, Tandridge
CR6	WARLINGHAM	Warlingham, parts of Chelsham and Farleigh, Hamsey Green	Bromley, Croydon, Tandridge
CR7	THORNTON HEATH	Thornton Heath, Broad Green (part), Pollards Hill (part)	Croydon, Merton
CR8	PURLEY	Purley, Russell Hill, Reedham, London	Croydon, Sutton
CR8	KENLEY	Kenley	Croydon, Tandridge
CR9	CROYDON		non-geographic
CR44	CROYDON	Jobcentre Plus	non-geographic
CR90	CROYDON		non-geographic

== Delivery offices ==
Delivery offices are located at Croydon, South Croydon, Caterham, Mitcham, Coulsdon, Thornton Heath and Purley.

== Map ==
CR postcode area map, showing postcode districts in red and post towns in grey text, with links to nearby BR, KT, RH, SE, SM, SW and TN postcode areas.

== See also ==
- List of postcode areas in the United Kingdom
- Postcode Address File
