= W postcode area =

Postcode area within the United Kingdom

London W
- Postcode area
- Coordinates: 51.511°N 0.196°W
- Country: United Kingdom
- Postcode area: W
- Postcode area name: London W
- Post towns: 1
- Postcode districts: 35
- Postcode sectors: 217
- Postcodes (live): 18,554
- Postcodes (total): 39,954
- Statistics as at May 2020

The W (Western and Paddington) postcode area, also known as the London W postcode area is a group of postcode districts covering part of central and part of West London, England. The area originates from the Western (W1) and Paddington (W2-14) districts of the London postal district. This area covers 35 postcode districts and around 18,554 live postcodes.

== Postal administration ==
The Western district consists of the single original W1 postal district. The area that it covers is high-density and so has been subdivided into a number of smaller postcode districts. When districts are used for purposes other than the sorting of mail, such as use as a geographic reference and on street signs, the W1 subdivisions continue to be classed as one 'district'. In June 2000, there was a recoding of the area, with the W1M, W1N, W1P, W1R, W1V, W1X and W1Y districts being replaced.

The mail centre for W1 is London Central, and that for W2-14 is Greenford.

Deliveries for W1 (and for WC1 and WC2) came from the Western District Office on Rathbone Place until it was decommissioned. It was a stop on the former London Post Office Railway, which has been mothballed since 2003. The Western District Office was initially on Wimpole Street, which was also a stop on the London Post Office Railway.

The Paddington district has 13 postcode districts (W2–14). Other than W2, the districts are arranged alphabetically, run from W3 (Acton) to W14 (West Kensington) and radiate westwards. The Paddington Head District Sorting Office was the western terminus of the London Post Office Railway, which ran 6.5 miles (10.5 km) to the Eastern District Office, at Whitechapel.

=== List of postcode districts ===
The approximate coverage of the postcode districts, with the historic postal district names shown in italics:

Postcode district	Post town	Coverage	Local authority area(s)
W1A	London	PO boxes & Admail codes in W1	non-geographic
W1B	London	Portland Place, Regent Street	Westminster
W1C	London	Oxford Street (west)	Westminster
W1D	London	Soho (south east); Chinatown, Soho Square	Westminster
W1F	London	Soho (north west)	Westminster
W1G	London	Harley Street	Westminster
W1H	London	Marylebone	Westminster
W1J	London	Mayfair (south), Piccadilly	Westminster
W1K	London	Mayfair (north), Grosvenor Square	Westminster
W1S	London	Mayfair (east), Hanover Square, Savile Row, Royal Academy	Westminster
W1T	London	Fitzrovia, Tottenham Court Road	Camden
W1U	London	Marylebone	Westminster
W1W	London	East Marylebone, Great Portland Street, Fitzrovia	Westminster
W2	London	Paddington head district: Paddington, Bayswater, Hyde Park, Westbourne Green, Little Venice (part), Notting Hill (part)	Westminster, Kensington and Chelsea
W3	London	Acton district: Acton, West Acton, North Acton (part), South Acton, East Acton (west), Park Royal (south), Hanger Hill Garden Estate, Gunnersbury Park	Ealing, Hounslow, Hammersmith and Fulham
W4	London	Chiswick district: Chiswick, Gunnersbury, Turnham Green, Acton Green, South Acton (part), Bedford Park	Hounslow, Ealing, Hammersmith and Fulham
W5	London	Ealing district: Ealing, South Ealing, Ealing Common, North Ealing, Northfields, (south and east), Pitshanger, Hanger Lane	Ealing, Hounslow
W6	London	Hammersmith district: Fulham, Hammersmith, Ravenscourt Park, Stamford Brook (part)	Hammersmith and Fulham, Hounslow
W7	London	Hanwell district: Hanwell, Boston Manor (part)	Ealing
W8	London	Kensington district: Kensington, Holland Park (part)	Kensington and Chelsea
W9	London	Maida Hill district: Maida Hill, Maida Vale, Queen's Park (part), West Kilburn	Westminster, Brent, Camden
W10	London	North Kensington district: Ladbroke Grove, Kensal Town, Queen's Park (part),	Kensington and Chelsea, Westminster, Hammersmith and Fulham, Brent
W11	London	Notting Hill district: Notting Hill, Ladbroke Grove (part), Holland Park (part)	Kensington and Chelsea, Westminster, Hammersmith and Fulham
W12	London	Shepherds Bush district: Shepherd's Bush, White City, Wormwood Scrubs, East Acton (east)	Hammersmith and Fulham
W13	London	West Ealing district: West Ealing, Northfields (north and west)	Ealing
W14	London	West Kensington district: West Kensington, Kensington Olympia, Holland Park	Hammersmith and Fulham, Kensington and Chelsea

== Boundaries ==
Postcode districts W1 and W2 are central to London, and W3 to W14 are mostly further west. The boundaries of the area and its numbered districts have changed over time and are the result of the working requirements of the Royal Mail. The boundaries do not coincide with the local authority areas. W1 is almost entirely in the City of Westminster, with a small part in the London Borough of Camden. W2 to W14 cover the northwestern part of the City of Westminster, the northern parts of the Royal Borough of Kensington and Chelsea and the London Borough of Hammersmith and Fulham and the eastern parts of the London Boroughs of Ealing and Hounslow, as well as very small parts of the London Boroughs of Brent and Camden.

== In popular culture ==
The TV series W1A satirises the goings-on at the BBC's Broadcasting House in Portland Place, whose memorable postcode is W1A 1AA.

AJ Tracey released the 2020 track "West Ten", which refers to the Ladbroke Grove area.

== Map ==
W postcode area map, showing postcode districts in red and post towns in grey text, with links to nearby HA, NW, SW, TW, UB and WC postcode areas.

== See also ==
- Postcode Address File
- List of postcode areas in the United Kingdom
- London postal district
