= WD postcode area =

Postcode area within the United Kingdom

Watford
- Postcode area
- Coordinates: 51.661°N 0.390°W
- Country: United Kingdom
- Postcode area: WD
- Postcode area name: Watford
- Post towns: 7
- Postcode districts: 14
- Postcode sectors: 70
- Postcodes (live): 7,344
- Postcodes (total): 15,889
- Statistics as at May 2020

The WD postcode area, also known as the Watford postcode area, is a group of eleven postcode districts in south-east England, within seven post towns. These cover south-west Hertfordshire (including Watford, Rickmansworth, Borehamwood, Kings Langley, Abbots Langley, Bushey and Radlett), plus very small parts of Buckinghamshire and Greater London.

Mail for this area is sorted at the Home Counties North Mail Centre in Hemel Hempstead, having been sorted at the Watford Mail Centre until its closure in 2011. The area covered includes all of the borough of Watford, most of the Three Rivers district, the western part of the Hertsmere district and small parts of the Dacorum and St Albans districts. WD3 also covers the village of Chenies in Buckinghamshire, plus a small protrusion of Harefield in the London Borough of Hillingdon.

== Coverage ==
The approximate coverage of the postcode districts:

Postcode district	Post town	Coverage	Local authority area(s)
WD3	RICKMANSWORTH	Rickmansworth, Chorleywood, Croxley Green, Loudwater, Mill End, Maple Cross, Sarratt, Batchworth, Chenies, Harefield (part), West Hyde, Heronsgate, Chandler's Cross	Three Rivers, Buckinghamshire, Hillingdon
WD4	KINGS LANGLEY	Kings Langley, Chipperfield, Hunton Bridge, Rucklers Lane, Bucks Hill	Dacorum, Three Rivers
WD5	ABBOTS LANGLEY	Abbots Langley, Bedmond	Three Rivers, St Albans
WD6	BOREHAMWOOD	Borehamwood, Elstree, Well End	Hertsmere
WD7	RADLETT	Radlett, Shenley	Hertsmere, St Albans
WD17	WATFORD	Watford town centre, Cassiobury, Nascot Wood	Watford
WD18	WATFORD	West Watford, Holywell	Watford
WD19	WATFORD	Oxhey, South Oxhey, Carpenders Park	Three Rivers, Watford
WD23	BUSHEY	Bushey, Bushey Heath	Hertsmere, Watford
WD24	WATFORD	North Watford	Watford
WD25	WATFORD	Garston, Leavesden, Aldenham, Letchmore Heath	Watford, Hertsmere, Three Rivers, St Albans
WD99	WATFORD	Jobcentre Plus	non-geographic

== Recoding ==
In September 2000 districts WD17-19 and WD23-25 were created from the recoding of the WD1 and WD2 districts. BUSHEY is a new post town; having previously been part of the WD2 district of WATFORD. This was due to postcode exhaustion of WD1 and WD2 Another reason for the postcode revision was the old WD2 area included Bushey with North Watford. Bushey was to all intents a section of Watford sorting office; up until 2000, all mail for WD2 was cut and tipped at Watford office. In order to change this, new codes were created to enable direct bags to be opened at Bushey delivery office.

== Map ==
WD postcode area map, showing postcode districts in red and post towns in grey text, with links to nearby AL, EN, HA, HP, NW, SL and UB postcode areas.

== See also ==
- Postcode Address File
- List of postcode areas in the United Kingdom
