= HA postcode area =

Postcode area within the United Kingdom

Harrow
- Postcode area
- Coordinates: 51.587°N 0.339°W
- Country: United Kingdom
- Postcode area: HA
- Postcode area name: Harrow
- Post towns: 7
- Postcode districts: 10
- Postcode sectors: 58
- Postcodes (live): 10,122
- Postcodes (total): 17,440
- Statistics as at May 2020

The HA postcode area, also known as the Harrow postcode area, is a group of ten postcode districts in England, within seven post towns. These cover part of northwest and west London, plus a very small part of south Hertfordshire.

The main sorting office is in Greenford (Green Park Way) and the area served includes all of the London Borough of Harrow, the northeastern part of the London Borough of Hillingdon, the western part of the London Borough of Brent and small parts of the London Boroughs of Barnet and Ealing, while the northern part of HA6 covers a small part of the Three Rivers district of Hertfordshire.

== Coverage ==
The approximate coverage of the postcode districts:

Postcode district	Post town	Coverage	Local authority area(s)
HA0	WEMBLEY	Wembley Central (west), North Wembley, Alperton, Sudbury (south)	Brent, Ealing, Harrow
HA1	HARROW	Harrow, Harrow on the Hill, North Harrow, Northwick Park, Sudbury (north), Sudbury Hill	Brent, Harrow
HA2	HARROW	North Harrow, South Harrow, West Harrow, Headstone, Rayners Lane (south)	Harrow
HA3	HARROW	Harrow Weald, Kenton, Wealdstone, Queensbury, Belmont (west and south)	Brent, Harrow
HA4	RUISLIP	Ruislip, Eastcote (west and south), South Ruislip, Ruislip Manor, Ruislip Gardens	Hillingdon
HA5	PINNER	Pinner, Eastcote (north and east), Hatch End, Rayners Lane (north), Carpenders Park (part)	Harrow, Hillingdon, Three Rivers
HA6	NORTHWOOD	Northwood, Northwood Hills, Moor Park	Hillingdon, Three Rivers
HA7	STANMORE	Stanmore, Queensbury, Belmont (north and east)	Barnet, Brent, Harrow
HA8	EDGWARE	Edgware, Burnt Oak, Canons Park, Queensbury, Colindale (part)	Barnet, Brent, Harrow
HA9	WEMBLEY	Wembley Central (east), Wembley Park, Preston, Tokyngton	Brent

== Map ==
HA postcode area map, showing postcode districts in red and post towns in grey text, with links to nearby NW, UB, W and WD postcode areas.

== See also ==
- Gore Hundred, which formed an area of about the same size, centred slightly east
- Postcode Address File
- List of postcode areas in the United Kingdom
