= UB postcode area =

Postcode area within the United Kingdom

Southall
- Postcode area
- Coordinates: 51.529°N 0.416°W
- Country: United Kingdom
- Postcode area: UB
- Postcode area name: Southall
- Post towns: 6
- Postcode districts: 12
- Postcode sectors: 41
- Postcodes (live): 7,112
- Postcodes (total): 11,514
- Statistics as at May 2020

The UB postcode area, also known as the Southall postcode area, is a group of eleven postcode districts in England, within six post towns. These cover parts of western and north-western Greater London, plus a very small part of Buckinghamshire. Despite being known as the Southall postcode area, the letters UB are an abbreviation of Uxbridge.

The main sorting office is in Greenford (Green Park Way) and the area served includes much of the London Borough of Hillingdon and the western part of the London Borough of Ealing, while the western part of UB9 covers a small part of Buckinghamshire, the southern part of UB2 covers a very small part of the London Borough of Hounslow, and a very small part of UB5 lies within the London Borough of Harrow.

== Coverage ==
The approximate coverage of the postcode districts:

Postcode district	Post town	Coverage	Local authority area(s)
UB1	SOUTHALL	Southall (north)	Ealing
UB2	SOUTHALL	Southall (south), Norwood Green	Ealing
UB3	SOUTHALL		non-geographic
UB3	HAYES	Hayes (south), Harlington	Hillingdon
UB4	HAYES	Hayes (north), Yeading	Hillingdon
UB5	GREENFORD		non-geographic
UB5	NORTHOLT	Northolt	Ealing
UB6	GREENFORD	Greenford, Perivale	Ealing
UB7	WEST DRAYTON	West Drayton, Harmondsworth, Sipson, Yiewsley, Longford	Hillingdon
UB8	WEST DRAYTON		non-geographic
UB8	UXBRIDGE	Uxbridge, Cowley, Hillingdon (part)	Hillingdon
UB9	UXBRIDGE	Denham, Harefield, Tatling End (east)	Hillingdon, Buckinghamshire
UB10	UXBRIDGE	Hillingdon, Ickenham	Hillingdon
UB11	UXBRIDGE	Stockley Park	Hillingdon
UB18	GREENFORD	Spring International	non-geographic

== Map ==
UB postcode area map, showing postcode districts in red and post towns in grey text, with links to nearby HA, SL, TW, W and WD postcode areas.

== See also ==
- Postcode Address File
- List of postcode areas in the United Kingdom
