= E postcode area =

London E
- Postcode area
- Coordinates: 51.545°N 0.014°W
- Country: United Kingdom
- Postcode area: E
- Postcode area name: London E
- Post towns: 1
- Postcode districts: 22
- Postcode sectors: 108
- Postcodes (live): 16,260
- Postcodes (total): 28,280
- Statistics as at May 2020

The E (Eastern) postcode area, also known as the London E postcode area, is the part of the London post town covering much of east London, England. It borders the N postcode area to the west, both north of the tidal reach of the River Thames. Since closure of the East London mail centre, its mail is sorted at Romford Mail Centre together with IG and RM postcode areas.

== Postal administration ==
The current E postcode area was originally formed in 1866 as a merger of the E and NE areas, which had been created in 1858. In 1917, the postal districts were numbered alphabetically by their most important parish, chapelry, topographical or built environment feature. As of 2004, the district names do not form part of the postal address. High demand caused sector nine of the E1 postcode district to be split and recoded in 1999 to create an E1W postcode district around Wapping, but the rest of the district did not gain an additional character. When districts are used for purposes other than the sorting of mail, such as use as a geographic reference and on street signs, E1 and E1W continue to be commonly classed as one 'district'. The E postcode area contains two non-geographic postcode districts for high-volume business users, E77 and E98.

The Eastern District Office is on Whitechapel Road and was the eastern terminus for the former London Post Office Railway. The railway ran 10.5 kilometres (6.5 mi) to the Paddington Head District Sorting Office.

The E20 postcode has been used fictionally in television soap-opera EastEnders since 1985. It has been a real postcode since 2011 carved from and only bordered by the E15 postcode, its buildings marketed as and often self-identifying as Olympic Park and Queen Elizabeth Park. It includes landmark sports venues built for the 2012 Summer Olympics.

=== List of postcode districts ===
The approximate coverage of the postcode districts, with the historic postal district names in italics, is as follows:

Postcode district	Post town	Coverage	Local authority area(s)
E1	London	Eastern head district: Aldgate (part), Bishopsgate (part), Whitechapel, Shoreditch (part), Spitalfields, Shadwell, Limehouse, Stepney, Mile End (part), Portsoken	Tower Hamlets, Hackney, City of London
E1W	London	Wapping district: Wapping, St Katharine Docks, Shadwell (part)	Tower Hamlets
E2	London	Bethnal Green district: Bethnal Green, Haggerston, Hoxton (part), Shoreditch (part), Cambridge Heath	Tower Hamlets, Hackney
E3	London	Bow district: Bow, Bow Common, Bromley-by-Bow, Old Ford, Mile End, Fish Island, Mill Meads (part)	Tower Hamlets, Newham
E4	London	Chingford district: Chingford, Waltham Abbey (part), Highams Park, Woodford Green (part)	Waltham Forest, Epping Forest
E5	London	Clapton district: Leyton (Part), Upper Clapton, Lower Clapton	Hackney, Waltham Forest
E6	London	East Ham district: East Ham, Beckton, Upton Park (part), Barking (part)	Newham, Barking and Dagenham
E7	London	Forest Gate district: Forest Gate, Leytonstone (Part), Stratford (part)	Newham, Waltham Forest
E8	London	Hackney district: Hackney Central, Dalston, London Fields, Haggerston (part)	Hackney, Islington
E9	London	Homerton district: Homerton, Hackney Wick, South Hackney, Hackney Marshes, Victoria Park	Hackney, Tower Hamlets
E10	London	Leyton district: Leyton, Temple Mills, Hackney Marshes (part) Upper Clapton (part), Walthamstow Marshes	Waltham Forest, Hackney
E11	London	Leytonstone district: Leytonstone, Wanstead, Aldersbrook (part), Snaresbrook, Cann Hall	Waltham Forest, Redbridge
E12	London	Manor Park district: Manor Park, Little Ilford, Aldersbrook (part)	Newham, Redbridge
E13	London	Plaistow district: Plaistow, West Ham (part), Upton Park (part)	Newham
E14	London	Poplar district: Poplar, Isle of Dogs, Limehouse, Canary Wharf, Millwall, Blackwall, Cubitt Town, South Bromley, North Greenwich, Leamouth	Tower Hamlets
E15	London	Stratford district: Stratford, West Ham (part), Maryland, Leyton (part), Leytonstone (part) Temple Mills (part), Hackney Wick (part), Bow (part)	Newham, Waltham Forest, Hackney, Tower Hamlets
E16	London	Victoria Docks and North Woolwich district: Canning Town, Silvertown, Royal Docks, North Woolwich, Beckton (part), Custom House, London City Airport	Newham
E17	London	Walthamstow district: Walthamstow, Upper Walthamstow, Leyton (part)	Waltham Forest
E18	London	Woodford and South Woodford district: Woodford, South Woodford	Redbridge
E20	London	Olympic Park district: Olympic Park, and parts of Stratford, Homerton, Leyton, Bow	Newham, Waltham Forest, Hackney, Tower Hamlets
E22	London	(new postcode district with postcodes on the Isle of Dogs)	Tower Hamlets
E77	London	Non-geographic postcode district (NatWest, delivers to E1)	Tower Hamlets
E98	London	Non-geographic postcode district (News International, delivers to E1W)	Tower Hamlets

The E17 postcode district is one of four to have a population above 100,000.

== Boundaries ==
The E postcode district is bounded by the River Thames to the south. Postcode districts E6, E14 and E16 also have river frontages in the south. The River Roding and the North Circular Road form part of the boundary in the east. The postcode area is roughly the combined area of the London Boroughs of Newham and Waltham Forest and majority of Tower Hamlets. Also, the eastern part of the London Borough of Hackney, the western sections of the London Boroughs of Redbridge (E11, E12, E18) and Barking and Dagenham (E6) and a small part of the City of London (E1) and Epping Forest District (E4), are within the postcode area.

== In popular culture ==
- The 1990s pop band East 17, formed in Walthamstow, whose postcode district is E17.
- Popular BBC TV soap EastEnders uses E20 (which did not actually exist until 2011) as the postcode district for the fictional borough of Walford.
- The track "Bow E3" by grime musician Wiley refers to the E3 postcode, which is centred on the area of Bow where Wiley grew up.
- The album E3 AF by Dizzee Rascal also refers to the E3 postcode and the Bow area, where he grew up.

== Map ==
E postcode area map, showing postcode districts in red and post towns in grey text, with links to nearby EC, EN, IG, N and SE postcode areas.

The postcode area excludes parts of East London like the following:

- Central areas covered by central London EC postcodes.
- Hoxton in Shoreditch is part of the N postcode area but is usually seen as being part of the East End.
- The eastern suburbs built after the introduction of the E postcode area are now mainly in the IG and RM postal areas.

== See also ==
- Postcode Address File
- List of postcode areas in the United Kingdom
- London postal district
- North East (London sub region)
