= Postcode Address File =

Database of addresses in the United Kingdom

The Postcode Address File (PAF) is a database that contains all known delivery points and postcodes in the United Kingdom. The PAF is a collection of over 29 million Royal Mail postal addresses and 1.8 million postcodes. It is available in a variety of formats including FTP download and compact disc, and was previously available as digital audio tape. As owner of the PAF, Royal Mail is required by section 116 of the Postal Services Act 2000 to maintain the data and make it available on reasonable terms. A charge is made for lookup services or wholesale supply of PAF data. Charges are regulated by Ofcom. It includes small user residential, small user organisation and large user organisation details. There have been requests as part of the Open Data campaign for the PAF to be released by the government free of charge.

== Usage ==
The "delivery points" held on the PAF are routing instructions used by Royal Mail staff to sort and deliver mail quickly and accurately. Elements of the address, including the post town and postcode, are occasionally subject to change, reflecting the operational structure of the postal delivery system. Each address is therefore not necessarily a geographically accurate description of where a property is located. Buildings which contain internal flats or businesses but have only one external front door will only have those internal elements recorded in PAF if the Royal Mail have direct access to them using a key or fob.

== File structure ==
Royal Mail's Programmers Guide lists the following address elements of PAF and their respective maximum field lengths:

Element	Field name	Description	Max length
Organisation	Organisation Name		60
Organisation	Department Name		60
Premises	Sub Building Name		30
Premises	Building Name		50
Premises	Building Number		4
Thoroughfare	Dependent Thoroughfare Name		60
Thoroughfare	Dependent Thoroughfare Descriptor		20
Thoroughfare	Thoroughfare Name	Street	60
Thoroughfare	Thoroughfare Descriptor		20
Locality	Double Dependent Locality	Small villages	35
Locality	Dependent Locality		35
Locality	Post town		30
Postcode	Postcode		7
PO Box	PO Box		6

Some versions of the PAF also contain the 'Delivery Point Suffix (DPS)' used in CBC (Customer Bar Code). Alternatively the DPS can be found using Royal Mail's 'Postcode Information File (PIF)'.

== Licensing ==
The PAF licence sets out what PAF can be used for. Licensing options include internal and external use and also more advanced options such as bureau services and broker groups.

An example of typical internal use is an employee of a licensed call centre who uses a PAF-based solution to look up and verify customer addresses. The PAF data is only being used within the licensed end-user and is not passed on to any other legal entity.

On the other hand, an example of external use would be a company which provides a PAF-based address look-up on their customer facing website for their own customers to use when they order goods or services.

Royal Mail provide licensing advice on their website.

== Public sector licence ==
Public sector organisations can now use PAF under the public sector licence use terms. The current public sector licence was renewed in April 2023 and runs until 31 March 2028.

The 2023-2028 public sector licence covers England, Wales and Scotland, and was procured centrally by the Geospatial Commission so that usage is free at the point of use for delivery of vital public services by the UK government, devolved administrations, local authorities, emergency services, health services, and search and rescue organisations. The contract now also incorporates Royal Mail Not Yet Built and Multiple Residence data.

The original public sector licence was implemented on 1 April 2015, having been developed by Royal Mail, the Department of Business, Innovation & Skills (BIS) and the Scottish government. The public sector licence was centrally paid for by these organisations so individual public sector organisations no longer needed to return PAF licence fees to Royal Mail.

Under the original licence, eligible public sector organisations were able to use PAF within their organisation and on their website for non-commercial purposes. In addition, licensed public sector organisations were able to share data with other licensed organisations and work collaboratively on data-led projects. The original licence was available to central government, local government, emergency services, health authorities and search and rescue organisations.

== Alias data ==
The "alias file" is a supplementary file containing additional data which are not part of official postal addresses, including details that have changed over time, or have been amended by the public and then used. This file is used to identify these elements and cross-reference with the official postal address.

The alias file holds four types of record: locality, thoroughfare, delivery point alias, and county alias:

- The locality record – old short forms, local names, and 'postally-not-required' (PNR) details.
- The thoroughfare record – contains replacement street and road names for a given locality, thoroughfare or dependent thoroughfare combination.
- The delivery point alias record – holds additional information at given addresses, such as trading names and building names.
- The county record – holds traditional, administrative and postal county information.

Royal Mail, in their guide to the data products imply that the county alias information was provided when Royal Mail removed the former postal county from the main file.

== Errors ==
Royal Mail acknowledges that the PAF contains errors, and publishes forms for submitting error reports. A very small number of addresses are not listed correctly, and others (especially new developments) may not be listed at all for a time.

== Costs and public availability ==
Between 2004 and 2006 a consultation was taken about the future management of the PAF. The proposal to release it for use at low or no cost was rejected, and the business model where it was used to raise money from profitable corporations was retained.

The accounts for the PAF for 2005/6 disclosed an income of £18 million, 8.6% of which was profit.

Following a government consultation, on 1 April 2010 Ordnance Survey released co-ordinate data for all Great Britain postcodes (but not their address elements) for re-use free of charge under an attribution-only licence, as part of OS OpenData.

== See also ==
- National Land and Property Gazetteer
- One Scotland Gazetteer
