= List of cemeteries in London =

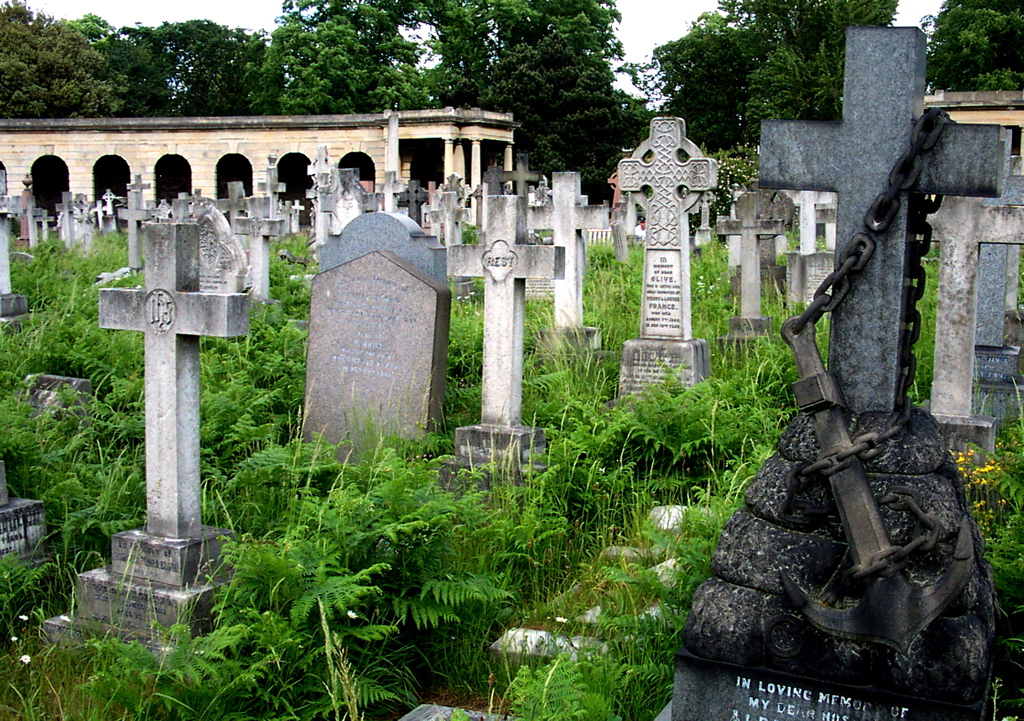
Tombs at Brompton Cemetery, one of seven large cemeteries established in London in the 1830s and 1840s

There are a number of cemeteries in Greater London. Among them are the Magnificent Seven, seven large Victorian-era cemeteries. There are also a number of crematoria. A number of cemeteries have listed buildings or structures, or have been placed on the National Register of Historic Parks and Gardens by English Heritage. Others have secured Green Heritage Site accreditation or may be on the UNESCO World Heritage List.

== "The Magnificent Seven" ==
The Magnificent Seven cemeteries were the first commercial cemeteries constructed around the outskirts of London. They are all of special historical value and are on the English Heritage lists.

Name	Date opened	London Borough	Postal area	Area acres	Graves (interments)	Closed	Remarks	"Friends"
Abney Park Cemetery	1840	London Borough of Hackney	N16	32.5	(200,000)	Yes	It became the main burial place of English nonconformists when Bunhill Fields closed	Yes
Brompton Cemetery	1840	Royal Borough of Kensington and Chelsea	SW10	38	35,000+ (205,000)	No	Owned and maintained by The Royal Parks	Yes
Highgate Cemetery	1839 (East); 1854 (West)	London Borough of Camden, Haringey and Islington	N6	38	53,000+ (170,000)	No	Divided into East and West cemeteries	Yes
Kensal Green Cemetery	1833	Royal Borough of Kensington and Chelsea	W10	70	65,000+ (250,000)	No	Also known as the General Cemetery of All Souls. The oldest of the Magnificent Seven and still in operation.	Yes
Nunhead Cemetery	1840	London Borough of Southwark	SE15	49	(270,000)	Yes	Also known as "Cemetery of all Saints"	Yes
Tower Hamlets Cemetery	1841	London Borough of Tower Hamlets	E3	33	(350,000)	Yes	Also known as Bow Cemetery. Closed in 1966	Yes
West Norwood Cemetery	1837	London Borough of Lambeth	SE27	39.5	42,000+ (200,000)	CF	Originally known as the South Metropolitan Cemetery. The first cemetery in the world designed in the Gothic Revival style	Yes

Abbreviations used in the column closed

C = Still used for cremations
F = Burial in family plots is still possible

=== Gallery ===
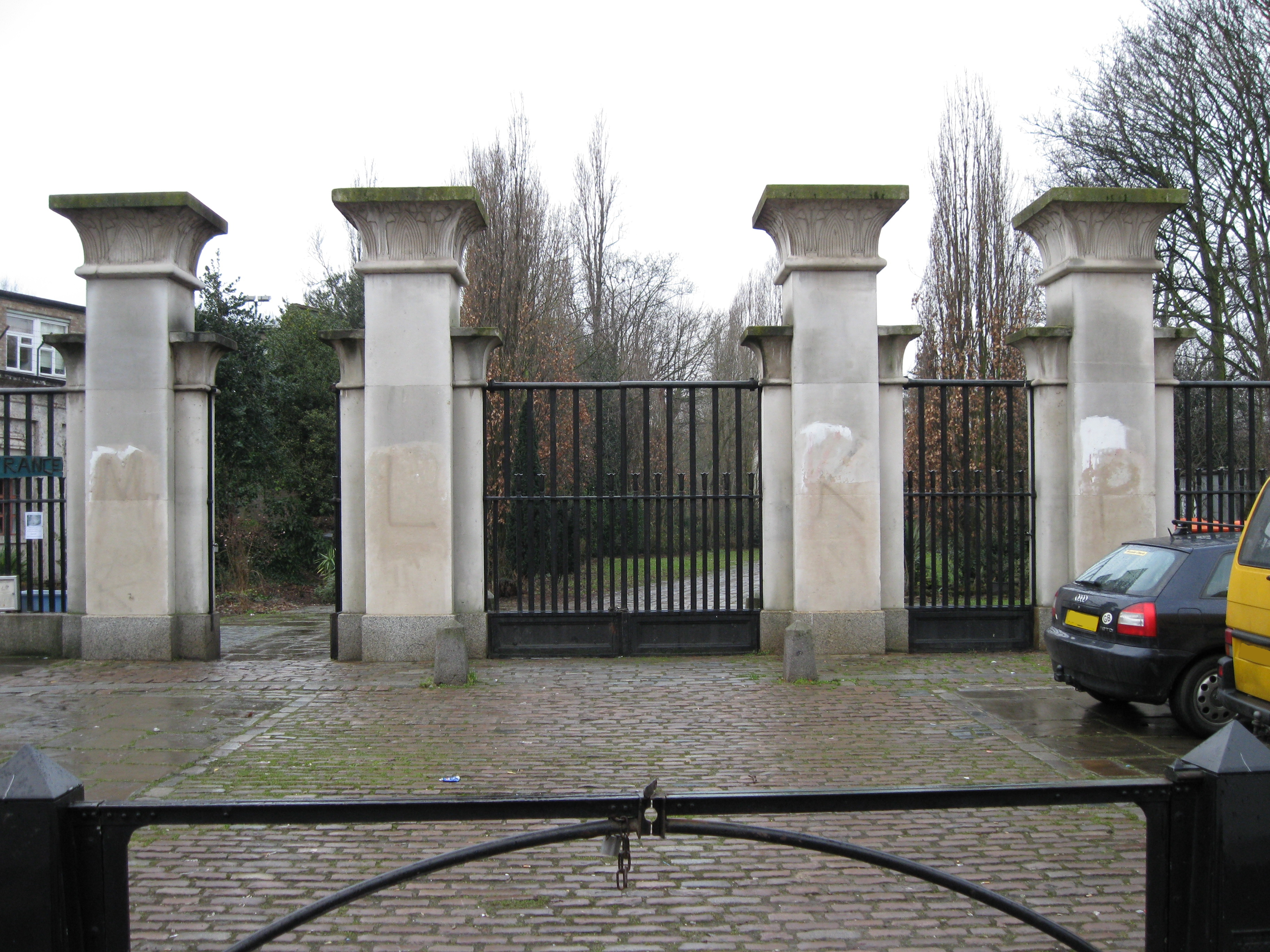
Abney Park Cemetery
Main Gate

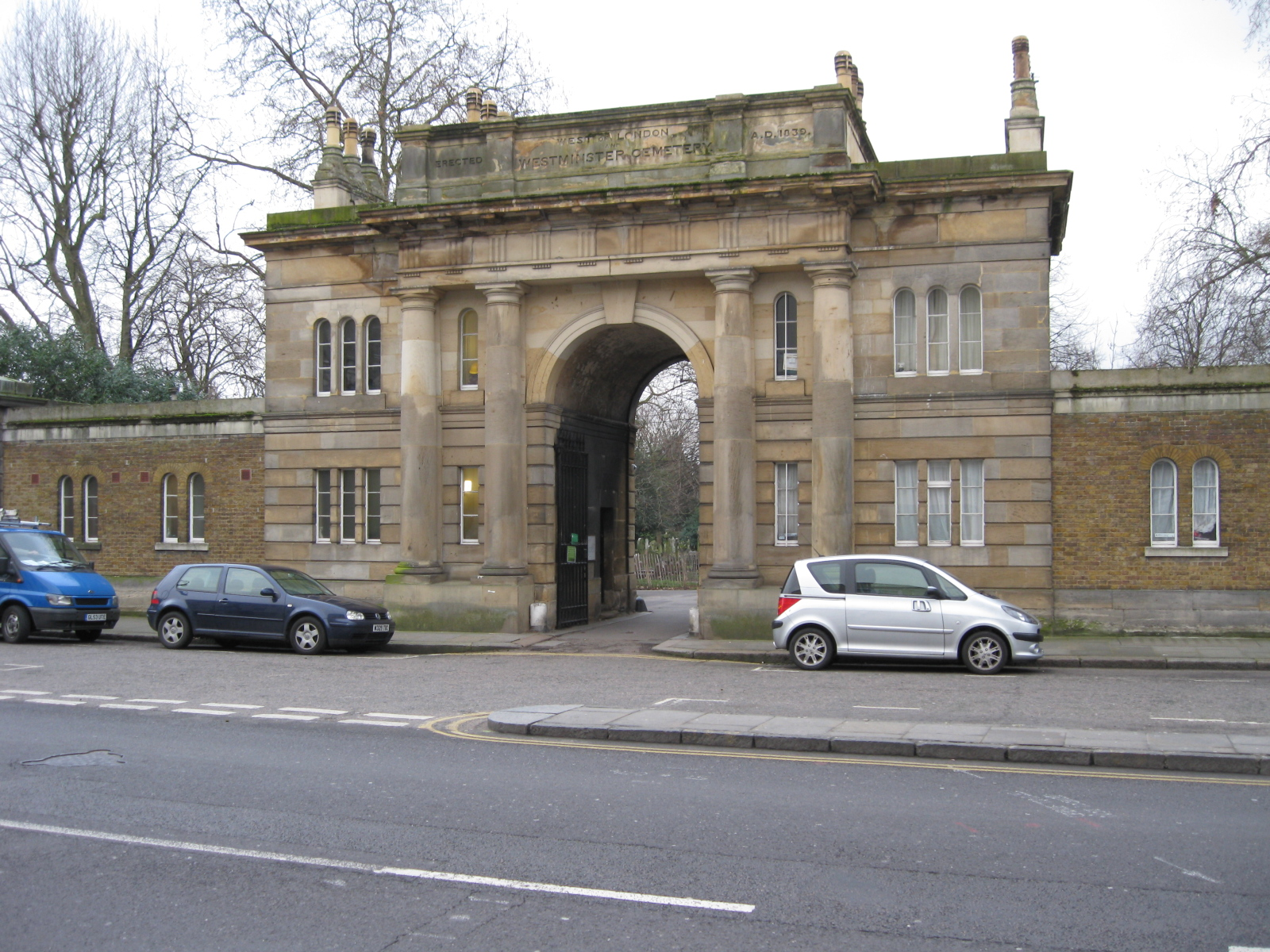
Brompton Cemetery
Main Gate

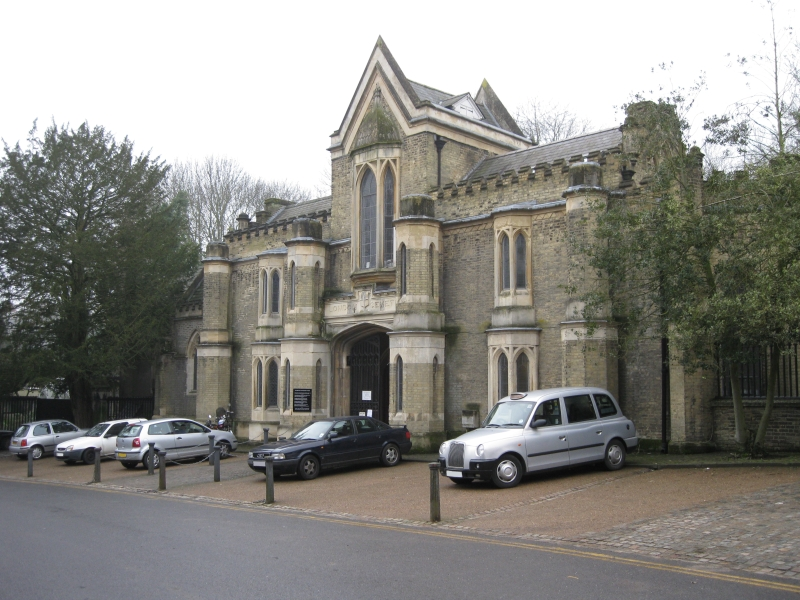
Highgate Cemetery
Main Gate

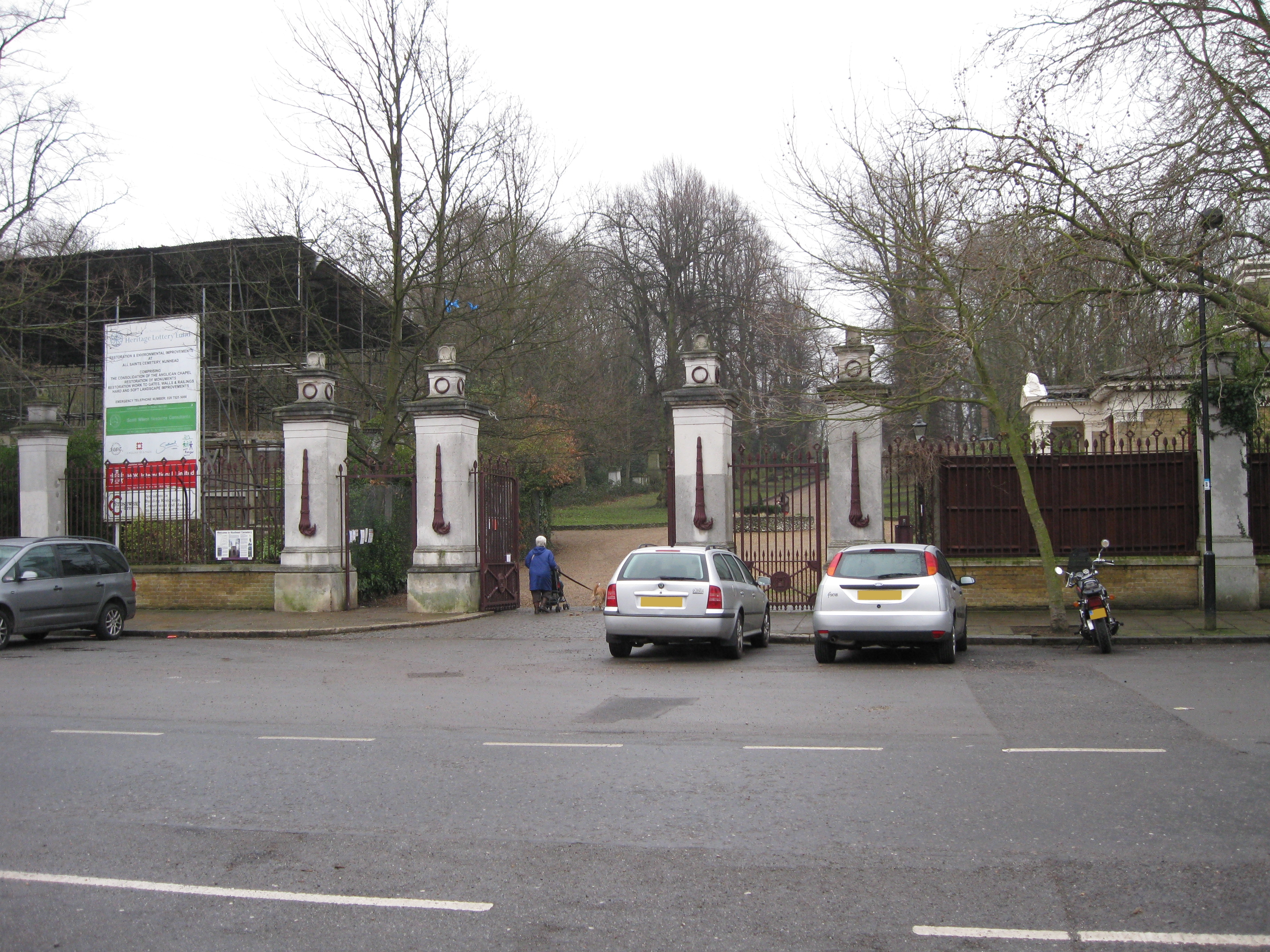
Nunhead Cemetery
Main Gate

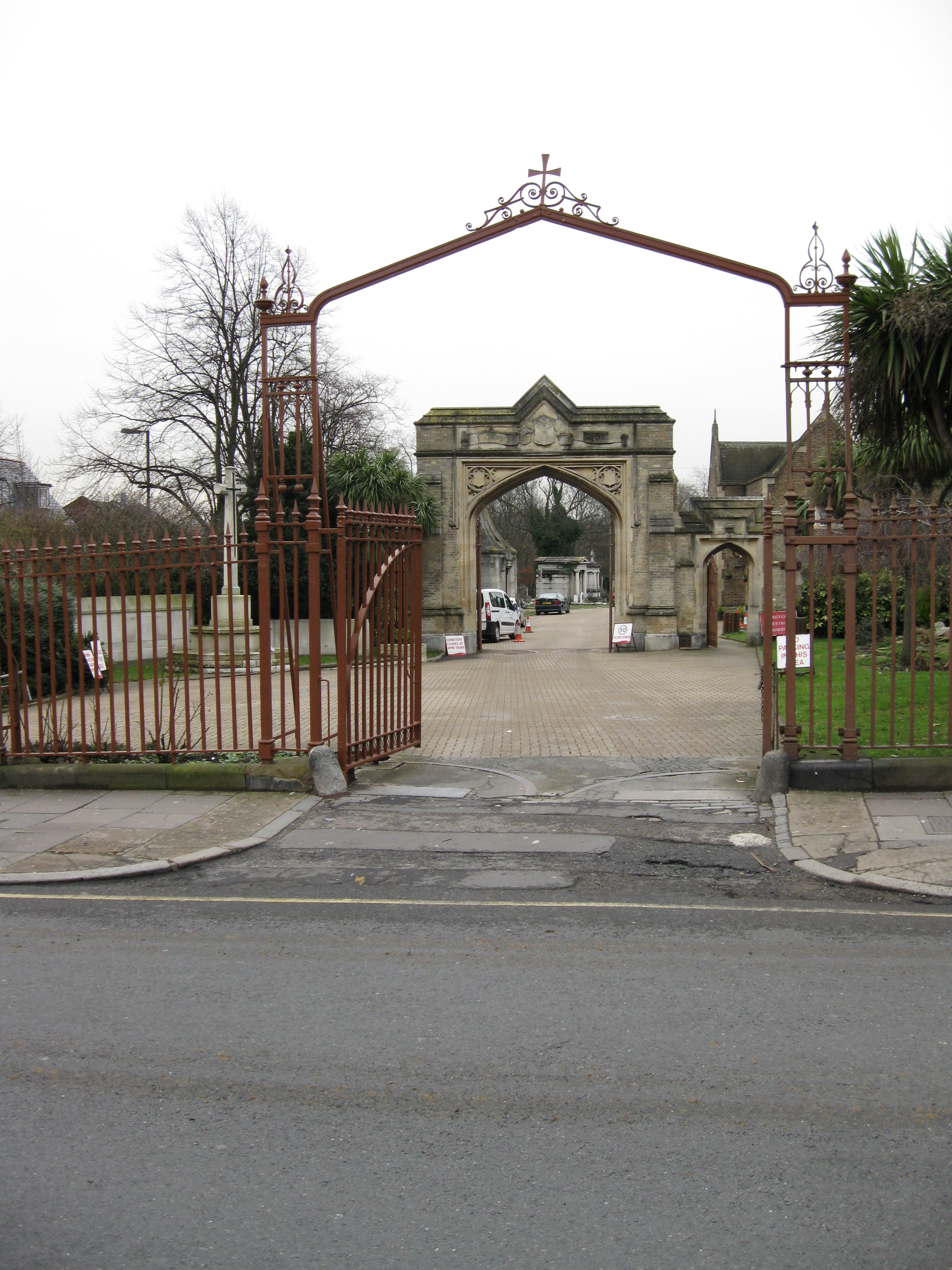
West Norwood Cemetery
Main Gate

== Jewish cemeteries ==
There are many Jewish cemeteries in London; they are not included here but some of them are listed at Jewish cemeteries in the London area.

== Roman Catholic cemeteries ==
Name	Date opened	Location	Postal area	Area acres	Closed	Notes	Website
St Mary's Roman Catholic Cemetery	1858	London Borough of Brent	NW10	30	No	Next to Kensal Green Cemetery and the West London Crematorium	Yes
St Patrick's Roman Catholic Cemetery	1861	London Borough of Waltham Forest	E11		No		–

== General cemeteries ==
Name	Date opened	Location	Postal area	Area acres	Closed	Notes	Website
Acton Cemetery	1895	London Borough of Ealing	W3	6.5 or 14.6	Yes		
Barking Cemetery	1886	London Borough of Barking and Dagenham	IG11	17	No	Usually known as Rippleside Cemetery	
Barnes Cemetery	1854	London Borough of Richmond upon Thames	SW13	16.5	Yes	Also known as Barnes Common Cemetery	–
Beckenham Cemetery	1876	London Borough of Bromley	BR3	42	No	Also known as Elmers End or Crystal Palace District Cemetery	Yes
Bell's Hill Burial Ground	1895	London Borough of Barnet	EN5		Yes	Also known as Chipping Barnet Cemetery	–
Borough Cemetery	1942	London Borough of Richmond upon Thames	TW2		No	Operated by Hounslow Borough Council	–
Brockley and Ladywell Cemeteries	1858	London Borough of Lewisham	SE4	21.5 + 15.5	No^{!}	Originally Deptford and Ladywell cemeteries. Examples of the first wave of Victorian municipal cemeteries.	Yes
Bromley Hill Cemetery	1907	London Borough of Bromley	BR1	6.4			
Bunhill Fields	1665	London Borough of Islington	EC1		Yes	Closed in 1854.	Yes
Camberwell New Cemetery	1927	London Borough of Southwark	SE23	80	No		Yes
Camberwell Old Cemetery	1855	London Borough of Southwark	SE22	44	No		Yes
Charlton Cemetery	1855	Royal Borough of Greenwich	SE7	8	No		Yes
Chingford Mount Cemetery	1884	London Borough of Waltham Forest	E4	41.5	No		
City of London Cemetery	1856	London Borough of Newham	E12	200	No^{!}		Yes
Eastern London Cemetery	2017	London Borough of Havering	RM13		No	The newest cemetery in London.	-
East Finchley Cemetery	1854	London Borough of Barnet	N2	40	No^{!}	Also known as St Marylebone Cemetery. Space is available but limited	Yes
East London Cemetery	1872	London Borough of Newham	E13	30	No		Yes
East Sheen Cemetery	1906	London Borough of Richmond upon Thames	TW10	16.5	No	Adjacent to Richmond Cemetery	Yes
Edmonton Cemetery	1886	London Borough of Enfield	N9	30.3			
Fulham Cemetery	1865	London Borough of Hammersmith and Fulham	SW6	13		Also known as Fulham Old Cemetery	
Greenwich Cemetery	1856	Royal Borough of Greenwich	SE9	22.5	No		Yes
Grove Park Cemetery	1935	London Borough of Lewisham	SE12		No	Listed by English Heritage as a landscape of special historic interest.	Yes
Gunnersbury Cemetery	1929	Royal Borough of Kensington and Chelsea	W3		No	Also known as Kensington Cemetery	Yes
Hampstead Cemetery	1876	London Borough of Camden	NW6	25	Yes	Cremated remains can still be buried	Yes
Hampton Cemetery	1879	London Borough of Richmond upon Thames	TW12	2.3	No		Yes
Hanwell Cemetery	1854	London Borough of Ealing	W7	23	No	Also known as (City of) Westminster Cemetery (not to be confused with the Kensington Hanwell Cemetery).	Yes
Hendon Park Cemetery and Crematorium	1899	London Borough of Barnet	NW7	42	No	Crematorium opened 1922	
Hertford Road Cemetery	1880	London Borough of Enfield	EN3	11			
Hither Green Cemetery	1873	London Borough of Lewisham	SE6	10.8	No	Originally began as Lee Cemetery which closed for burial 1878 the remainder of the cemetery is still open for burials	Yes
Isleworth Cemetery	1879	London Borough of Hounslow	TW7		Yes		–
Kemnal Park Cemetery & Memorial Gardens	2013	London Borough of Bromley	BR7		No		Yes
Kensington Hanwell Cemetery	1855	London Borough of Ealing	W7	17	Yes	Also known as the Old Kensington Cemetery (not to be confused with the City of Westminster Cemetery, Hanwell).	Yes
Lambeth Cemetery	1854	London Borough of Wandsworth (location); London Borough of Lambeth (owner)	SW17	41	Yes		Yes
Lavender Hill Cemetery	1872	London Borough of Enfield	EN2	28			
London Road Cemetery	1877	London Borough of Bromley	BR1	4.8			
Manor Park Cemetery	1874	London Borough of Newham	E7	45	No		
Margravine Cemetery	1869	London Borough of Hammersmith and Fulham	W6	16.5	Yes	Formerly known as Hammersmith Cemetery; Hammersmith Old Cemetery; Margravine Road Cemetery	Yes
Mill Hill Cemetery	1936	London Borough of Barnet	NW7	26	No	Formerly known as Paddington New Cemetery	Yes
Mitcham Road Cemetery	1897	London Borough of Croydon	CR0	27	No	Formerly Croydon Cemetery	Yes
Morden Cemetery	1891	London Borough of Merton	SM4	125	No		
Mortlake Cemetery	1926	London Borough of Richmond upon Thames (location); London Borough of Hammersmith and Fulham (owner)	TW9	31	No	Also known as Hammersmith New Cemetery	Yes
New Southgate Cemetery	1861	London Borough of Enfield	N11	84	No	Formerly known as Great Northern London Cemetery	Yes
North Sheen Cemetery	1909	London Borough of Richmond upon Thames (location); London Borough of Hammersmith and Fulham (owner)	TW9	31	No	Also known as Fulham New Cemetery	Yes
Northwood Cemetery	1915	London Borough of Hillingdon	HA6	23	No		Yes
Paddington Old Cemetery	1855	London Borough of Brent	NW6	25	No		Yes
Plumstead Cemetery	1890	Royal Borough of Greenwich	SE2	32.6			
Putney Old Burial Ground	1763	London Borough of Wandsworth	SW15		Yes	Upper Richmond Road. Closed 1854.	Yes
Putney Vale Cemetery	1891	London Borough of Wandsworth	SW15	58	No		Yes
Queen's Road Cemetery	1861	London Borough of Croydon	CR0	24	No		Yes
Richmond Cemetery	1839	London Borough of Richmond upon Thames	TW10	13.1	No	Next to East Sheen Cemetery	Yes
Romford Cemetery	1871	London Borough of Havering	RM7	25	No		Yes
St Mary's Cemetery	1860	London Borough of Wandsworth	SW11	8	Yes	Formerly Battersea St Mary's Cemetery; Battersea Rise Cemetery	Yes
St Pancras and Islington Cemetery	1854	London Borough of Barnet	N2	99.5 + 77	No	Also known as the Islington and St Pancras Cemetery	Yes
South Ealing Cemetery	1861	London Borough of Ealing	W5	27	Yes	Formerly Ealing and Old Brentford Cemetery. Closed to new burials	
Southgate Cemetery	1880	London Borough of Enfield	N14		No		–
Strayfield Cemetery	2013	London Borough of Enfield	EN2	12		Adjacent to Lavender Hill Cemetery	
Streatham Cemetery	1894	London Borough of Wandsworth (location); London Borough of Lambeth (owner)	SW17	23.3	Yes	Also known as Garratt Lane Cemetery	Yes
Teddington Cemetery	1879	London Borough of Richmond upon Thames	TW11		No	Typical Victorian cemetery. Listed by English Heritage as a landscape of special historic interest.	Yes
Tottenham Cemetery	1858	London Borough of Haringey	N17	56	No		
Trent Park Cemetery	1960	London Borough of Enfield	EN4		No		Yes
Twickenham Cemetery	1868	London Borough of Richmond upon Thames	TW2	8	No		
Upminster Cemetery	1902	London Borough of Havering	RM14	2	No		Yes
Vineyard Passage Burial Ground	1790	London Borough of Richmond upon Thames	TW10		Yes		Yes
Wandsworth Cemetery	1878	London Borough of Wandsworth	SW18	34.2	No	Magdalen Road. Also known as Magdalen Cemetery	Yes
West Ham Cemetery	1857	London Borough of Newham	E15	20	Yes		
West Ham Jewish Cemetery	1857	London Borough of Newham	E15	10	Yes		Yes
Willesden New Cemetery	1891	London Borough of Brent	NW10	26.8	Yes		Yes
Wimbledon Cemetery	1876	London Borough of Merton	SW19	20.5	No	Also known as Gap Road Cemetery	
Woolwich cemetery	1856	Royal Borough of Greenwich	SE18	34.2	No	First ('Old') cemetery opened in 1856; new cemetery opened in 1885	Yes

No^{!} = Cemetery is approaching capacity

== Other burial grounds ==
Name	Notes
Huguenot Burial Ground	Now a public park and no longer regarded as a cemetery. Part of the Huguenot history of Wandsworth.
Moravian Burial Ground	Not a traditional cemetery.
Royal Hospital Chelsea Burial Ground	Part of the Royal Hospital Chelsea. Many monuments for Chelsea pensioners.
Royal Hospital Greenwich Cemetery	Part of the Royal Naval Hospital; in 1847 East Greenwich Pleasaunce was opened as the hospital's graveyard, with remains being disinterred from the original Hospital graveyard in 1875 to allow for railway construction. The graveyard is now a public park.
St Paul's Cathedral	Burials and memorials are not considered a "regular" cemetery.
Westminster Abbey	As a Royal Peculiar it is not considered a "regular" cemetery.

== Crematoria ==
Name	Date opened	London Borough	Postal area	Location	Remarks
Beckenham Crematorium	1956	London Borough of Bromley		Beckenham Crematorium and Cemetery	Also known as Elmer's End Crematorium & Cemetery
City of London Crematorium: New	1971	London Borough of Newham (location); City of London Corporation (owner)		City of London Cemetery and Crematorium	
City of London Crematorium: Old	1904	London Borough of Newham (location); City of London Corporation (owner)		City of London Cemetery and Crematorium	Superseded 1971. Now only used as a chapel
Croydon Crematorium	1937	London Borough of Croydon	CR0	Mitcham Road Cemetery	
Enfield Crematorium	1938	London Borough of Enfield	EN1	London Borough of Enfield	
Golders Green Crematorium	1902	London Borough of Barnet	NW11	London Borough of Barnet	Own grounds
Honor Oak Crematorium	1939	London Borough of Southwark	SE23	Camberwell New Cemetery	
Hendon Park Crematorium	1922	London Borough of Barnet	NW7	Hendon Park Cemetery and Crematorium	
Mortlake Crematorium	1939	London Borough of Richmond upon Thames (location)	TW9	Kew	It is Grade II listed, and was the first crematorium in England to be established under its own Act of Parliament. The crematorium serves the London Borough of Ealing, the London Borough of Hammersmith & Fulham, the London Borough of Hounslow and the London Borough of Richmond upon Thames.
West Norwood Crematorium	1915	London Borough of Lambeth	SE27	West Norwood Cemetery	

== Former cemeteries ==
Many of these cemeteries were former graveyards and carry the name of the church they belonged to.

Name of the cemetery	Period in service	Location	Postal area	Remains moved to	M*	Remarks
Cross Bones Graveyard	????–1853	Redcross Way	SE1		M	Also known as the Halloween Graveyard
Enon Chapel	1823–1842	St. Clement's Lane	WC2	West Norwood Cemetery	D	Later renamed Clare Market Chapel
St Benet Gracechurch	1181–1868	Gracechurch Street	EC3M	City of London Cemetery and Crematorium	M	Also known as Grass Church
St James' Gardens	1788–1853	Euston Station	NW1 2RT	Excavated remains have been moved to multiple locations	D	Grave of Captain Matthew Flinders discovered.

M*, if a memorial or something similar was erected to commemorate the former burial ground or cemetery

? = Unknown
D = Disappeared
M = Memorial in the relocation site
P = Memorial plaque near or on the former site

== See also ==
- List of cemeteries in England
- Hyde Park pet cemetery
