= List of Jewish cemeteries in London =

There are many Jewish cemeteries in the London area; some are included in the List of cemeteries in London. This list includes those cemeteries and also some just outside the Greater London boundary. Jews are also buried at other, not specifically Jewish, cemeteries. Between 1832 and 1841 the "Magnificent Seven" private cemeteries were opened, primarily to relieve Central London's Anglican churchyards. Later, some of them also encompassed burials for people from other faiths; many Jews of international renown are buried at Highgate Cemetery. Brookwood Cemetery in Surrey, opened in 1852, designated approximately half of the original cemetery to non-Anglicans, including Jews.

== United Synagogue cemeteries ==
Name	Opened	Borough	Postcode	Closed	Notes	Website	Image
Alderney Road Jewish Cemetery	1697	London Borough of Tower Hamlets	E1	1852	Also known as The Great Synagogue Burial Ground, this is Britain's oldest Ashkenazi cemetery. It is listed Grade II by Historic England.	Yes	
Bancroft Road Jewish Cemetery	1810	London Borough of Tower Hamlets	E1	1907	The Maiden Lane Synagogue constructed this cemetery on land formerly known as Globe Fields.	Yes	
Brady Street Cemetery	1761	London Borough of Tower Hamlets	E1	1858	The cemetery, no longer used, was originally the burial ground for the New Synagogue and was subsequently used by the Great Synagogue. Several notable people are buried there.	Yes	
Bushey Jewish Cemetery	1947	Borough of Hertsmere, Hertfordshire	WD23	No	There are now two cemeteries operating at Bushey – Bushey "Old" Cemetery and Bushey "New" Cemetery, both of which are still active for funerals, stone settings and visiting. Bushey "Old" Cemetery is at Little Bushey Lane, Bushey, Hertfordshire WD23 3TP and Bushey "New" Cemetery is 400m down the road at Little Bushey Lane, Bushey, Hertfordshire WD23 3FF.	Yes	
East Ham Jewish Cemetery	1919	London Borough of Newham	E6	Yes	110 servicemen and servicewomen from both world wars are buried here.	Yes	
Lauriston Road Cemetery	1788	London Borough of Hackney	E9	1886	The cemetery originally belonged to the Hambro Synagogue.	Yes	
Plashet Jewish Cemetery	1896	London Borough of Newham	E6	Yes		Yes	
Waltham Abbey Jewish Cemetery	1960	Epping Forest District of Essex	EN9	No		Yes	
West Ham Jewish Cemetery	1856	London Borough of Newham	E15	2002	The cemetery was established by the New Synagogue on Great St Helen's, soon joined by the Great Synagogue in Duke's Place, both of them London congregations. There are a number of notable people buried here, in a graveyard visually dominated by the imposing Rothschild Mausoleum. One section contains graves removed to this burial place from the former Hoxton burial ground of the Hambro Synagogue when that site underwent urban redevelopment. The oldest legible tombstone in this section dates from 1794.	Yes	
Willesden Jewish Cemetery	1891	London Borough of Brent	NW10	Yes, but burial in existing family plots is available on request	This has been described as the "Rolls-Royce" of London's Jewish cemeteries and is designated Grade II on Historic England's Register of Historic Parks and Gardens. In 2015 it was awarded a grant from the Heritage Lottery Fund to restore some key features of the cemetery and to create a visitor centre, a permanent exhibition and a web-based education project.	Yes	

== Federation Burial Society cemeteries ==
Name	Opened	Borough	Postcode	Closed	Notes	Website	Image
Edgwarebury Lane Jewish Cemetery	2021	London Borough of Barnet	HA8	No	The cemetery, which has more than 7,000 burial plots, is the Federation's first new cemetery for almost 80 years.	Yes	
Edmonton Jewish Cemetery	1889	London Borough of Enfield	N18	No	The cemetery, which has 40,000 graves, was established in 1889, on a strip of his family's land that was presented by Lord Montagu to the Federation of Synagogues for use as a burial site: the Federation Burial Society was formally established in 1890.	Yes	
Rainham Jewish Cemetery	1938	London Borough of Havering	RM13	No	This, the Federation's second cemetery, had 106 acres originally, with room for 45,000 to 50,000 graves. In 2016, when the cemetery was at 60% of capacity, the Federation sold about 20 acres of the land.	Yes	

== Jewish Joint Burial Society cemeteries ==
Name	Opened	Borough	Postcode	Closed	Notes	Website	Image
New Southgate Cemetery and Crematorium		London Borough of Enfield	N11			Yes	
Woodland Cemetery		Borough of Broxbourne, Hertfordshire	EN7	No		Yes	

== Union of Orthodox Hebrew Congregations cemeteries ==
Name	Opened	Borough	Postcode	Closed	Notes	Website	Image
Carterhatch Lane Cemetery	1906	London Borough of Enfield	EN1	Inactive		No	
Silver Street Cemetery	Unknown	Borough of Broxbourne, Hertfordshire	EN7	No		No	

== Western Charitable Foundation cemeteries ==
Name	Opened	Borough	Postcode	Closed	Notes	Website	Image
Fulham Road Jewish Cemetery	1815	Royal Borough of Kensington and Chelsea	SW3	1884	It is also known as Fulham Cemetery and as Brompton Jewish Cemetery.	Yes	
Streatham Jewish Cemetery	1915	London Borough of Lambeth	SW16	No	This is a section of Streatham Park Cemetery. The majority of burials here are those of Ashkenazi Jews of eastern European origin who settled in the Soho area of London and worked as tailors, cabinetmakers, shopkeepers, etc. A small section of Streatham Park Cemetery is reserved for members of the South London Liberal Synagogue. This cemetery contains the Commonwealth war graves of 13 service personnel from World War II.	Yes	
Western Cemetery	1968	Borough of Broxbourne, Hertfordshire	EN7	No	First established as the cemetery of the Western (now Western Marble Arch) Synagogue, as well as the independent West End Great Synagogue, it is now run by the Western Charitable Foundation, which extends burial rights to the Jewish Joint Burial Society, Liberal Judaism and Waltham Forest Hebrew Congregation.	Yes	

== West London Synagogue cemeteries ==
Name	Opened	Borough	Postcode	Closed	Notes	Website	Image
Balls Pond Road Cemetery	1843	London Borough of Islington	N1	1951	It is also known as Jewish (West London Reform) Cemetery, Kingsbury Road Cemetery, Balls Pond Burial Ground and The Jewish Burial Ground.	No	
Golders Green Jewish Cemetery (West Side)	1895	London Borough of Barnet	NW11	No	Also known as Hoop Lane Jewish Cemetery, it is maintained by a joint burial committee representing members of the West London Synagogue and the S&P Sephardi Community (the Spanish and Portuguese Jews Congregation) who share ownership of the cemetery.	Yes	

== S&P Sephardi Community cemeteries ==
Name	Opened	Borough	Postcode	Closed	Notes	Website	Image
Brentwood Jewish Cemetery	1974	Borough of Brentwood, Essex	CM14	1974	It contains c.7500 remains removed from Nuevo Cemetery, London in 1974, according to a plaque near the entrance to a mass grave.	No	
Golders Green Jewish Cemetery (East Side)	1895	London Borough of Barnet	NW11	No	Also known as Hoop Lane Jewish Cemetery, it is maintained by a joint burial committee representing members of the West London Synagogue and the S&P Sephardi Community (the Spanish and Portuguese Jews Congregation) who share ownership of the cemetery.	Yes	
Novo Cemetery	1733	London Borough of Tower Hamlets	E1	1922	Also known as Beth Chaim Jewish Cemetery, this Sephardi cemetery is now within the campus of Queen Mary University. It is Grade II listed.	No	
Mile End Velho (Old) Jewish Cemetery	1657	London Borough of Tower Hamlets	E1	1737	This is reputed to be the oldest surviving Jewish cemetery in the United Kingdom. A tablet in the north wall of the cemetery is Grade II listed.	No	

== Other cemeteries ==
Name	Opened	Borough	Postcode	Closed	Notes	Website	Image
Edgwarebury Jewish Cemetery	1972	London Borough of Barnet	HA8	No	The cemetery is managed by the Edgwarebury Joint Burial Board (EJBB) on behalf of the S&P Sephardi Community, West London Synagogue, Liberal Judaism and the independent Belsize Square Synagogue. The ashes of Amy Winehouse and her grandmother are buried here.	Yes	
Liberal Jewish Cemetery	1914	London Borough of Brent	NW10	No	Established by the Liberal Jewish Synagogue, it was originally known as the Liberal Jewish and Belsize Square Cemetery. Several notable British Jews, including members of the Sassoon family, are buried at the cemetery, which also has a Grade II listed war memorial. It is adjacent to Willesden United Synagogue Cemetery.	Yes	

== Former cemeteries ==
Name	Opened	Borough	Postcode	Closed	Notes	Image
Hoxton Jewish Cemetery	1707	London Borough of Hackney	N1	Date unknown	The cemetery, also known as Hoxton Old Burial Ground, was destroyed in 1960, and the remains were transferred to West Ham Jewish Cemetery.	
