= Kemnal =

Kemnal may refer to:

- Kemnal Technology College, a secondary school and sixth form college located in the London Borough of Bromley, England
- The Kemnal Academies Trust, a multi-academy trust serving a family of schools mainly in Kent and West Sussex, England
- Kemnal Park Cemetery & Memorial Gardens a privately owned cemetery in the London Borough of Bromley, England.
- James Kemnal (1864 – 1927) an English engineer and industrialist
