= Fulham Cemetery =

Cemetery in London

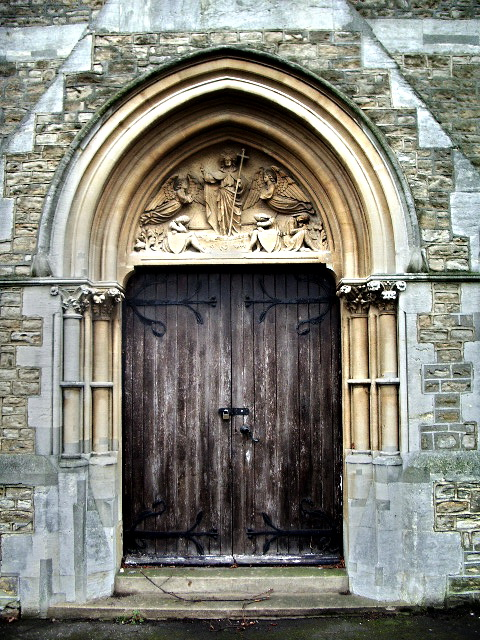
- Fulham Cemetery chapel doorway
- Interactive map of Fulham Cemetery

Details
- Established: 1 August 1865 (date of consecration)
- Location: Fulham Palace Road, London Borough of Hammersmith and Fulham
- Country: England
- Coordinates: 51°28′49″N 0°13′00″W
- Owned by: Hammersmith and Fulham Borough Council
- Size: 13 acres
- Website: Official website
- Find a Grave: Fulham Cemetery

Fulham Cemetery, also known as Fulham Old Cemetery and as Fulham Palace Road Cemetery, is in the London Borough of Hammersmith and Fulham, just off Fulham Palace Road. Designed by John Hall, it opened in 1865. The closest London Underground station is Barons Court.

== Notable burials ==
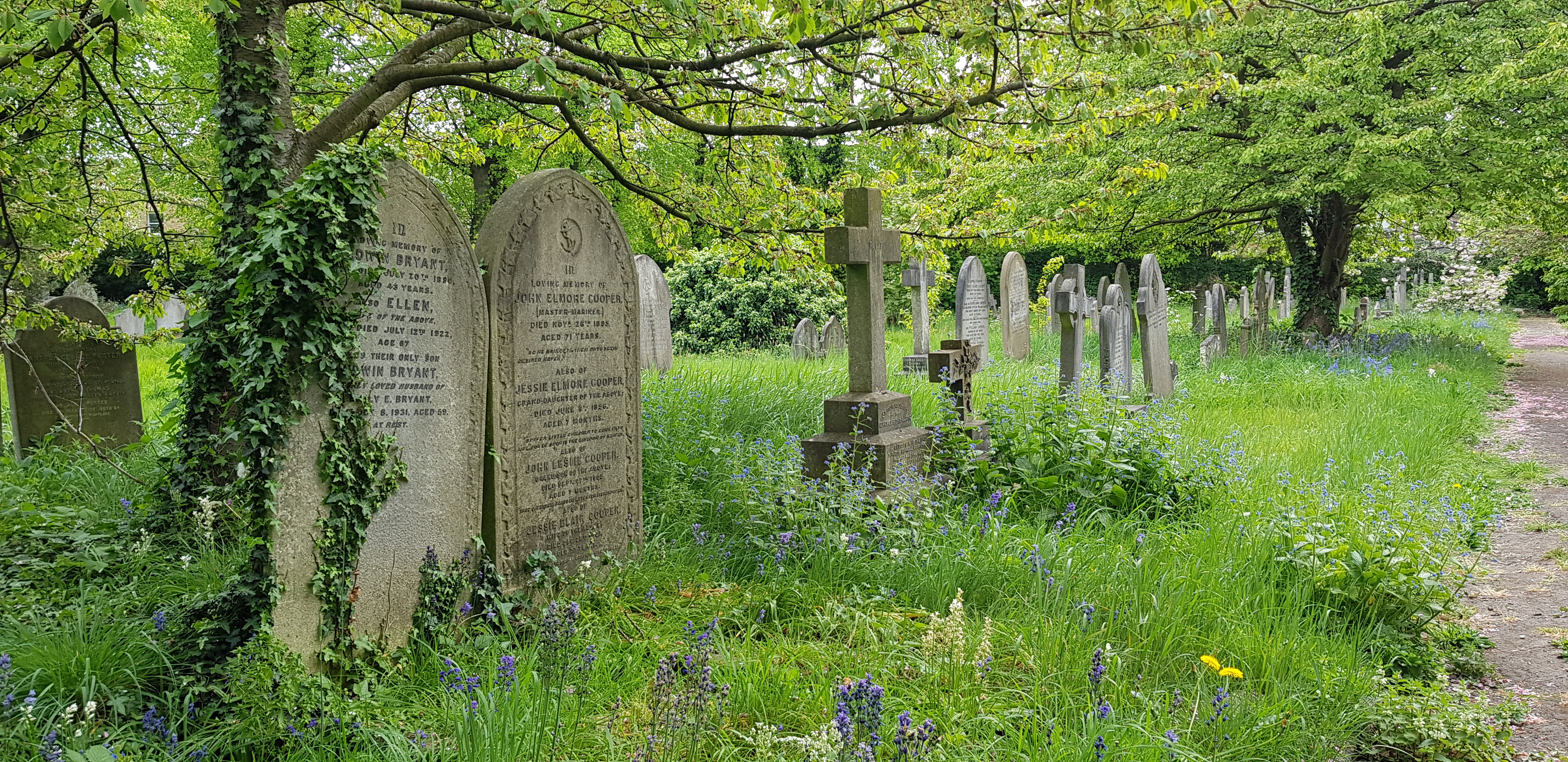
The cemetery

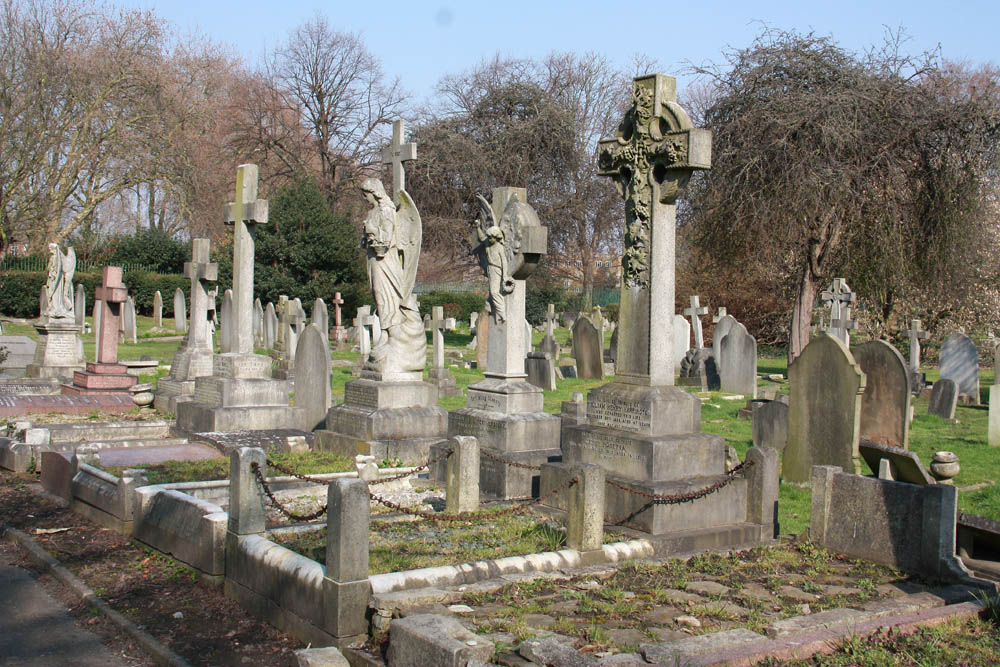
Another view of the cemetery

- Lieutenant-General Sir Burke Douglas Cuppage KCB (1794–1877), Lieutenant-Governor of Jersey 1863–68.

The cemetery contains the war graves of 238 Commonwealth service personnel, 179 from World War I of whom seven are commemorated by a special memorial headstone, and 57 from World War II. Those whose graves have no headstones are listed by name on a screen wall memorial in the main war graves plot.

== See also ==
- Fulham Road Jewish Cemetery, Jewish cemetery on Fulham Road
- North Sheen Cemetery, also known as Fulham New Cemetery, which is in Kew in the London Borough of Richmond upon Thames
