= Nunhead Cemetery =

Cemetery in Nunhead, London, England

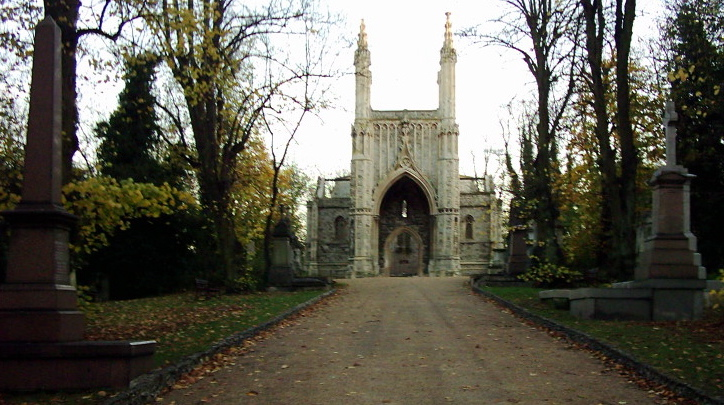
- View up The Avenue from the North Gate towards the Anglican Chapel
- Interactive map of Nunhead Cemetery

Details
- Established: 1840
- Location: Linden Grove, London
- Country: England
- Coordinates: 51.46423°N 0.05304°W
- Type: Public
- Size: 21 hectares (52 acres)
- Website: Official website

London Cemetery Company Act 1836
- Act of Parliament
- Parliament of the United Kingdom
- Long title: An Act for establishing Cemeteries for the Interment of the Dead, Northward, Southward, and Eastward of the Metropolis, by a Company to be called "The London Cemetery Company."
- Citation: 6 & 7 Will. 4. c. cxxxvi

Dates
- Royal assent: 17 August 1836

Text of statute as originally enacted

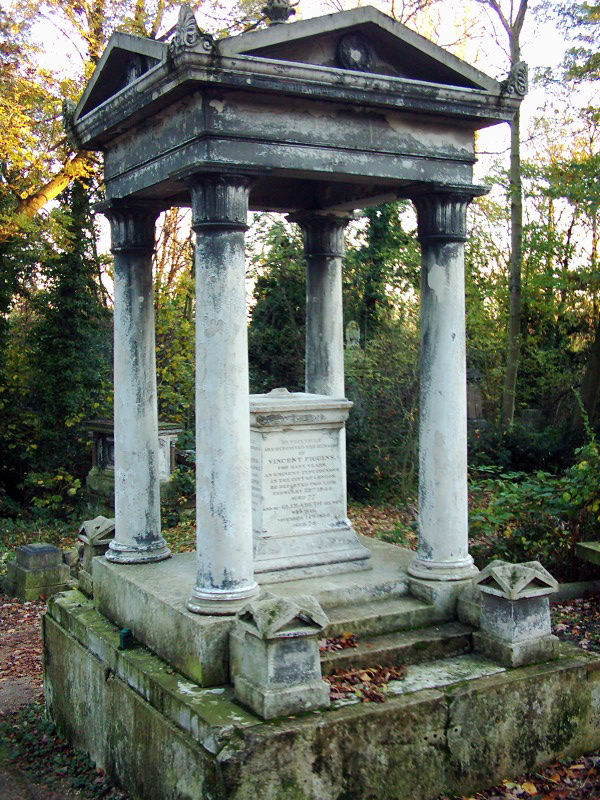
Grave of Vincent Figgins (d. 1844). Memorial designed by William Pettit Griffith.

Nunhead Cemetery is one of the Magnificent Seven cemeteries in London, England. It is perhaps the least famous and celebrated of them. The cemetery is located in Nunhead in the London Borough of Southwark and was originally known as All Saints' Cemetery. Nunhead Cemetery was consecrated in 1840 and opened by the London Cemetery Company, which had been incorporated by the London Cemetery Company Act 1836 (6 & 7 Will. 4. c. cxxxvi). It is designated a local nature reserve.

== Location ==
The Main Gate (North Gate) is located on Linden Grove (near the junction with Daniel's Road) and the South Gate is located on Limesford Road. The cemetery is in the London Borough of Southwark, SE15.

== History and description ==
The cemetery was consecrated in 1840, with an Anglican chapel designed by Thomas Little. It is one of the "Magnificent Seven" Victorian cemeteries established in a ring around what were then the outskirts of London, and is one of two located south of the River Thames (the other being West Norwood). The first burial was of Charles Abbott, a 101-year-old Ipswich grocer; the last burial was of a volunteer soldier who became a canon of Lahore Cathedral. The first grave in Nunhead was dug in October 1840. The average annual number of burials over the ten years 1868–1878 was 1685: 1350 in the consecrated, and 335 in the unconsecrated ground.

Remains from the demolished church and churchyard of St Christopher le Stocks in the City of London were reinterred at Nunhead in 1867 and 1933.

The cemetery contains examples of the imposing monuments to the most eminent citizens of the day, which contrast sharply with the small, simple headstones marking common or public burials. By the middle of the 20th century, the cemetery was nearly full, and so was abandoned in 1969 by the United Cemetery Company, which had absorbed the bankrupt London Cemetery Company in 1960. The cemetery was bought in 1975 by Southwark Council from the United Cemetery Company using powers granted by the Greater London Council (General Powers) Act 1975. With the ensuing neglect, the cemetery gradually changed from lawn to meadow and eventually to woodland. It is now a local nature reserve and Site of Metropolitan Importance for wildlife, populated with songbirds, woodpeckers and tawny owls.

A lack of care and cash surrendered the graves to the ravages of nature and vandalism, but in the early 1980s the Friends of Nunhead Cemetery was formed to renovate and protect the cemetery.

The cemetery was reopened in May 2001 after an extensive restoration project funded by Southwark Council and the Heritage Lottery Fund. Fifty memorials were restored along with the Anglican Chapel.

== Notable burials ==
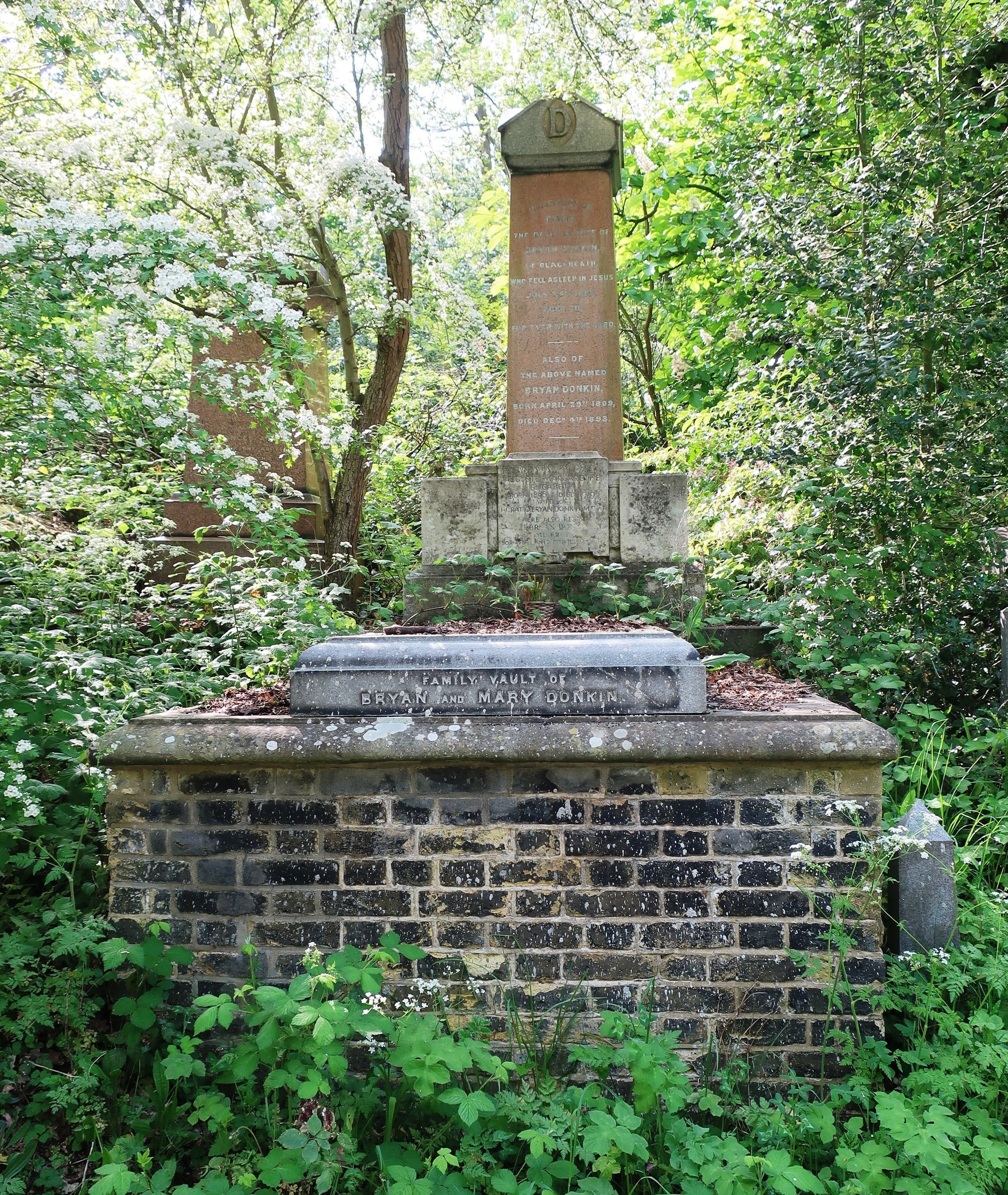
Vault of Bryan Donkin (d. 1855) and his family

- Sir Frederick Abel, 1827–1902, co-inventor of Cordite
- Robert Abel, 1857–1936, England test cricketer
- George John Bennett, 1800–1879, English Shakespearian actor
- William Brough, 1826–1870, writer and playwright
- Joseph Lemuel Chester, 1821–1882, American genealogist, poet and editor
- Bryan Donkin, 1768–1855, engineer who developed a paper-making machine and food-canning process
- Edward John Eliot, 1782–1863, Peninsular War soldier
- Vincent Figgins, 1766–1844, typefounder
- James Figgins, 1811-1884, MP, son of Vincent Figgins
- Sir Charles Fox, 1810–1874, civil and railway engineer
- Jenny Hill, 1848–1896, music hall performer
- Henry Jupp 1841-1889. England test cricketer
- Sir Polydore de Keyser, 1832–1898, lawyer and Roman Catholic Lord Mayor of London
- Sir George Livesey, 1834–1908, engineer, industrialist and philanthropist
- Cicely Nott, 1832–1900, singer and actress
- John Proctor, 1836–1914, artist, illustrator and cartoonist
- Charles Rolls, 1799–1885, engraver
- Thomas Tilling, 1825–1893, bus tycoon
- Alfred Vance, 1839–1888, English music hall performer
- Charles Frederick Williams (4 May 1838 – 9 February 1904), was a Scottish-Irish writer, journalist, and war correspondent

== Layout and other structures ==
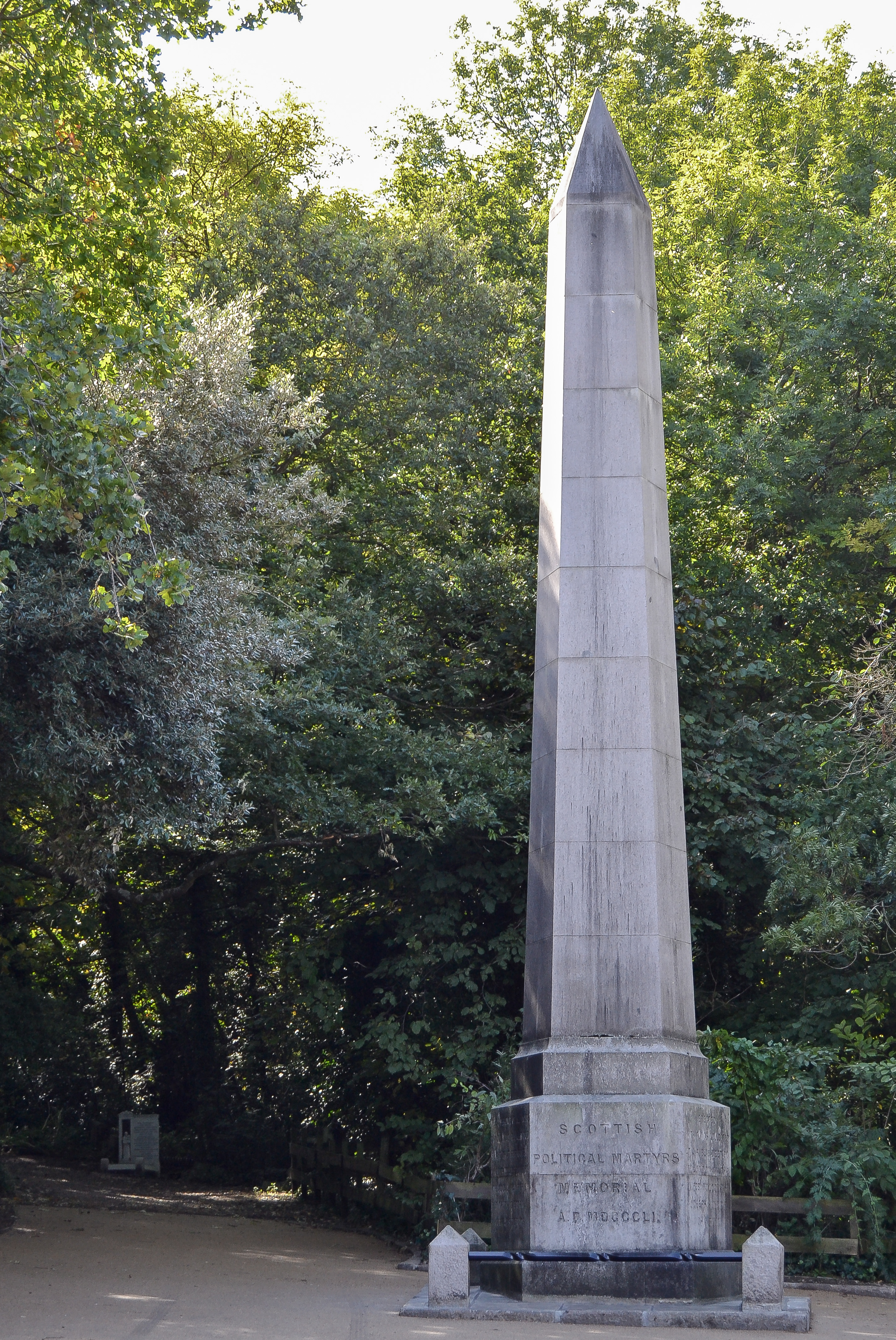
The Scottish Martyrs Memorial

At 52 acres, Nunhead is the second largest of the Magnificent Seven cemeteries. Views across London include St Paul's Cathedral.

The Victorian part of the cemetery is currently in a poor state of repair, being best described as an elegant wilderness; locals like to call it a nature reserve. Many areas of the cemetery are fairly overgrown with vines, as visible in newer tourist photos. Numerous tombstones lean to the side. Although the Friends of Nunhead Cemetery are doing their best to restore some parts of the cemetery it is badly in need of care and funding. It is about 52 acres (210,000 m^{2}) and is a popular place to walk.

The lodges and monumental entrance were designed by James Bunstone Bunning. There is an obelisk, the "Scottish Political Martyrs Memorial", the second monument (the other is in Edinburgh) dedicated to the leaders of the Friends of the People Society, popularly called the Scottish Martyrs, including Thomas Muir, Maurice Margarot, and Thomas Fyshe Palmer, who were transported to Australia in 1794. It was erected by Radical MP Joseph Hume in 1851–52. It is immediately on the right on Dissenters Road, when entering through the North Gate.

A memorial commemorates nine Sea Scouts who died in the Leysdown Tragedy off the Isle of Sheppey in 1912, including Percy Baden Powell Huxford aged 12 (named after, but not related to, Lord Baden Powell). The original memorial, designed by Sir Giles Gilbert Scott, was erected in 1914. Most of this was removed after vandalism, and only the base remains. The present replacement memorial was erected in 1992, on the initiative of the Friends of Nunhead Cemetery.

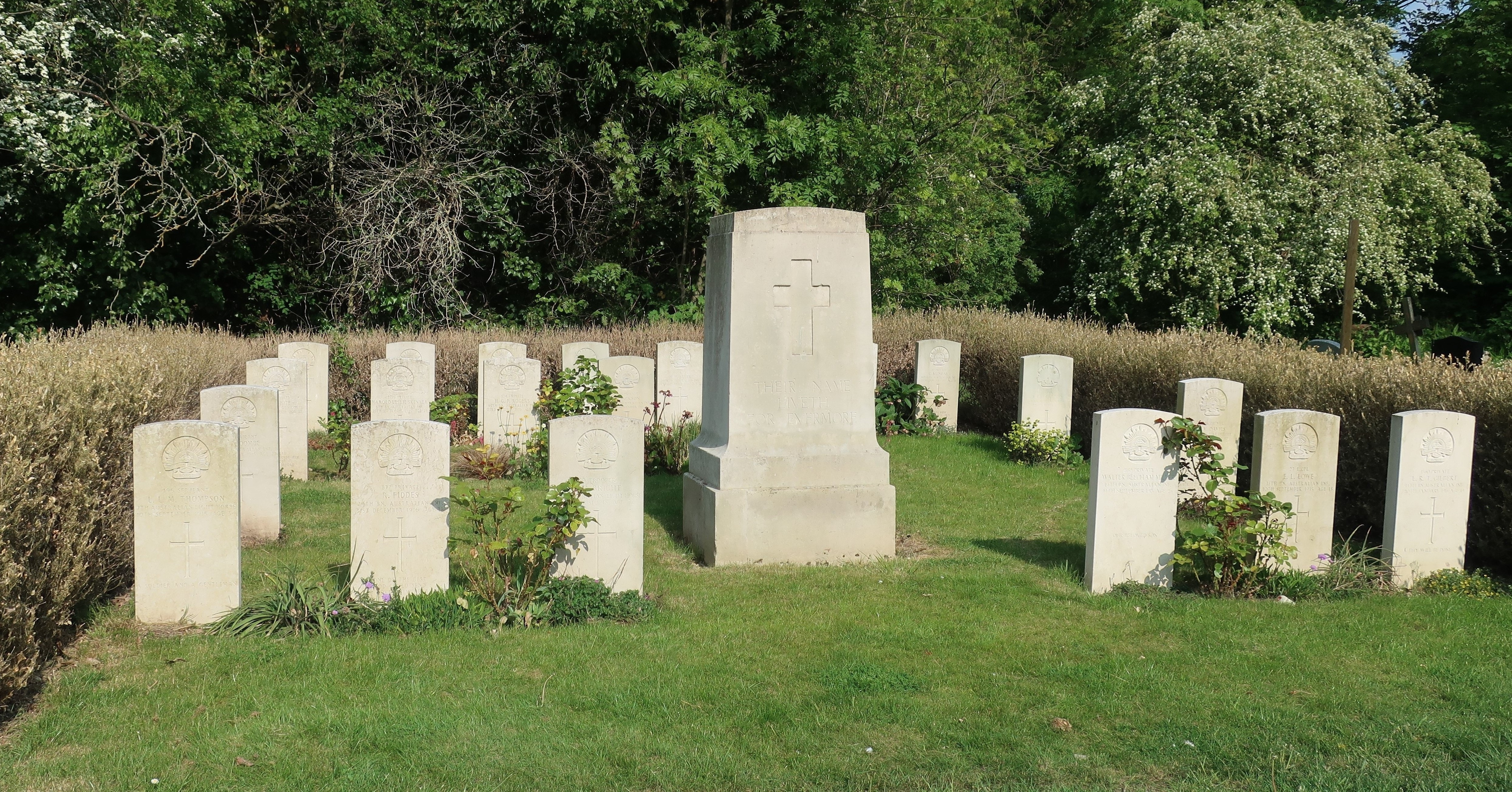
First World War CWGC Australian plot

There are a large number of First and Second World War war graves in the cemetery, the greater proportion (592 graves) being Commonwealth service burials from the former war. Most of those are concentrated between three war graves plots: the United Kingdom plot (Square 89), holding 266 graves, the Australian plot which holds 23 graves, and the Canadian plot (Square 52) which holds 36 graves, including burials of South African and New Zealand servicemen. Those buried in the UK plot and in individual graves outside the three plots are, because of not being marked by headstones, listed by name on a Screen Wall memorial inside the cemetery's main entrance. A second Screen Wall lists 110 Commonwealth service personnel of the Second World War who are buried in another war graves plot (Square 5), and elsewhere whose graves could not be marked by headstones. There is also a Belgian war grave of the First World War.

== Transport ==
The cemetery is easily reached with public transport via local buses and National Rail:

- Bus: 78, 343 and 484 all have stops nearby
- Train: Nunhead railway station is close by.

== Gallery ==
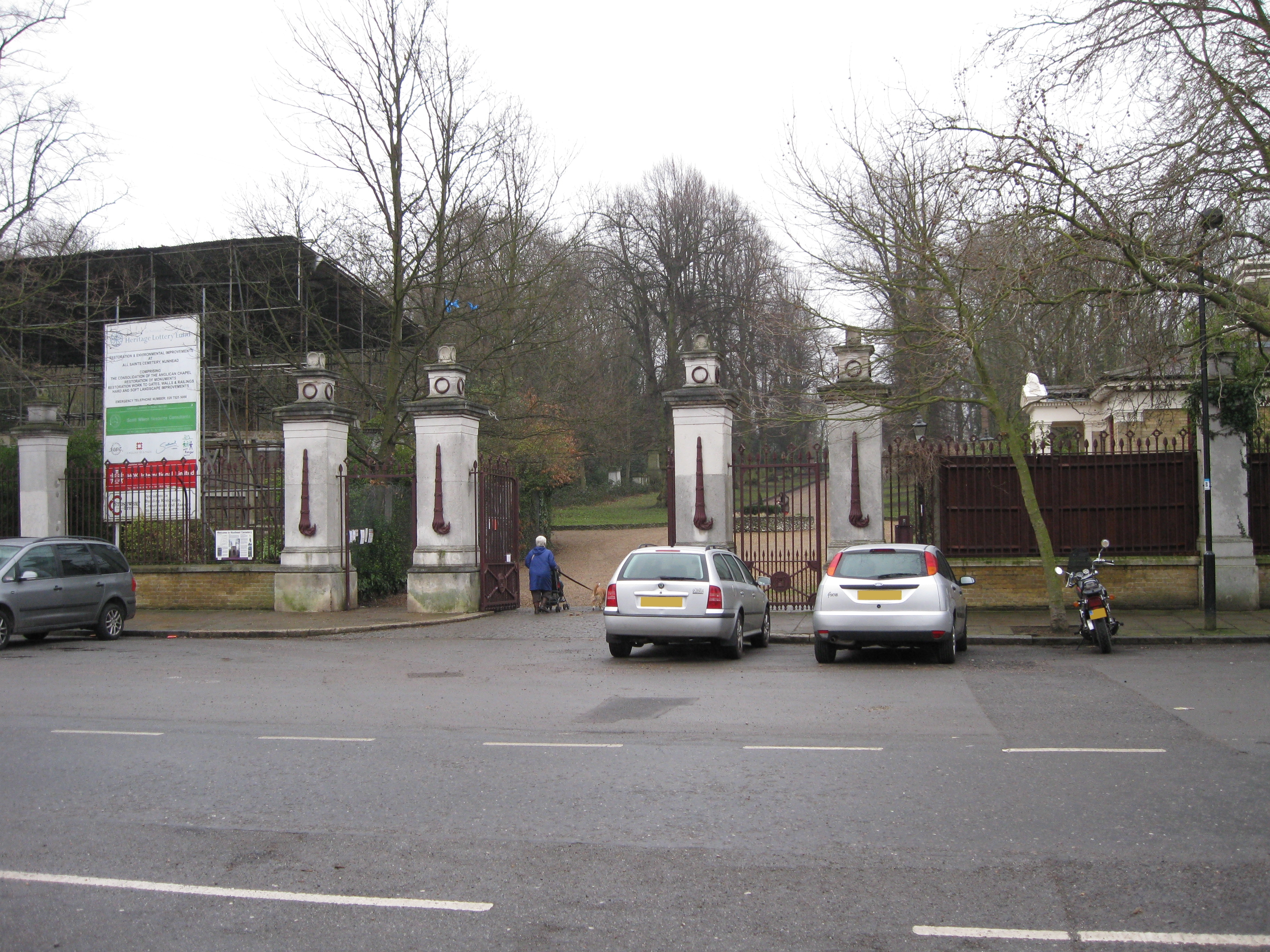
The North Gate

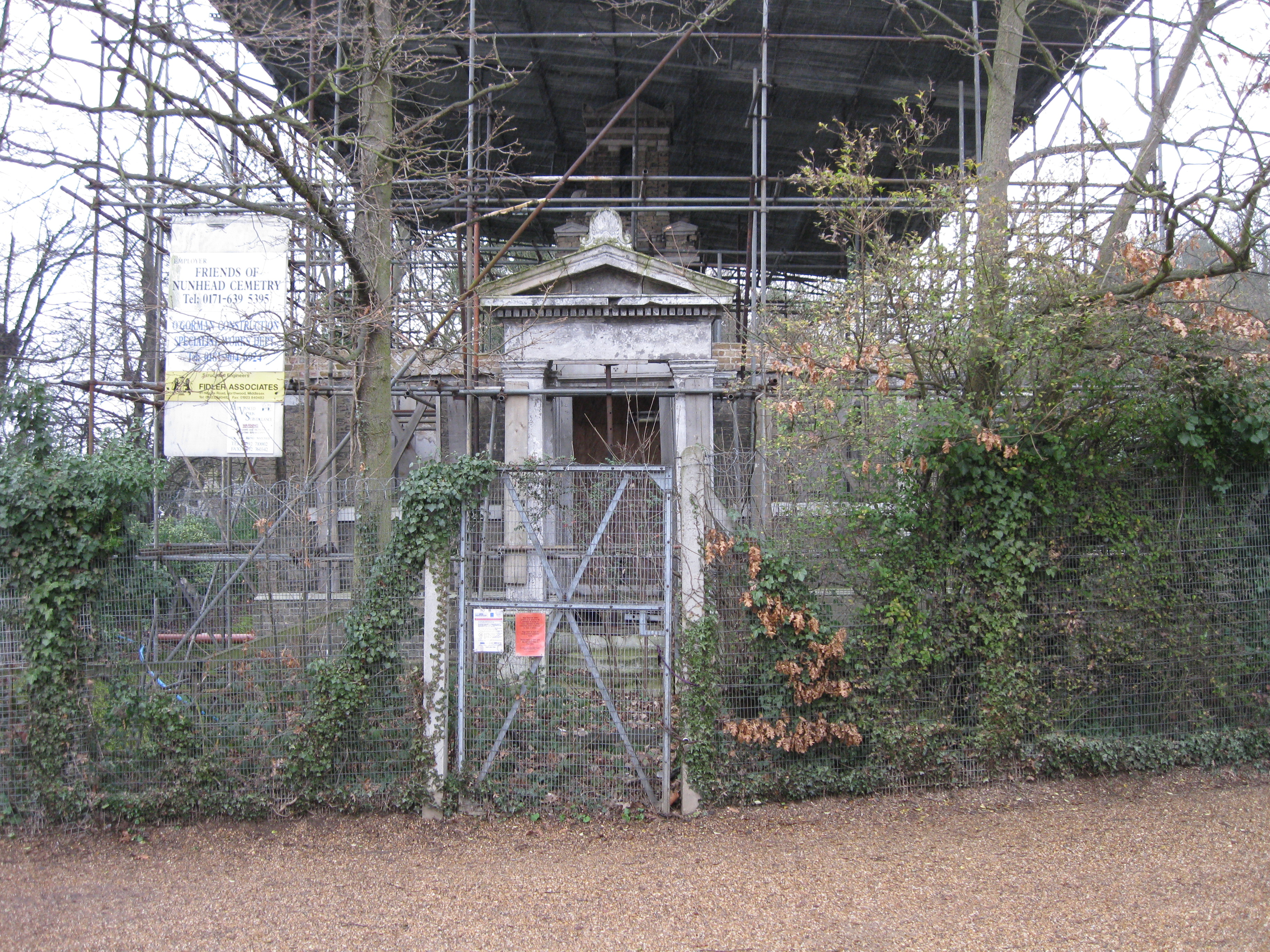
The Gate Lodge, left of the North Gate

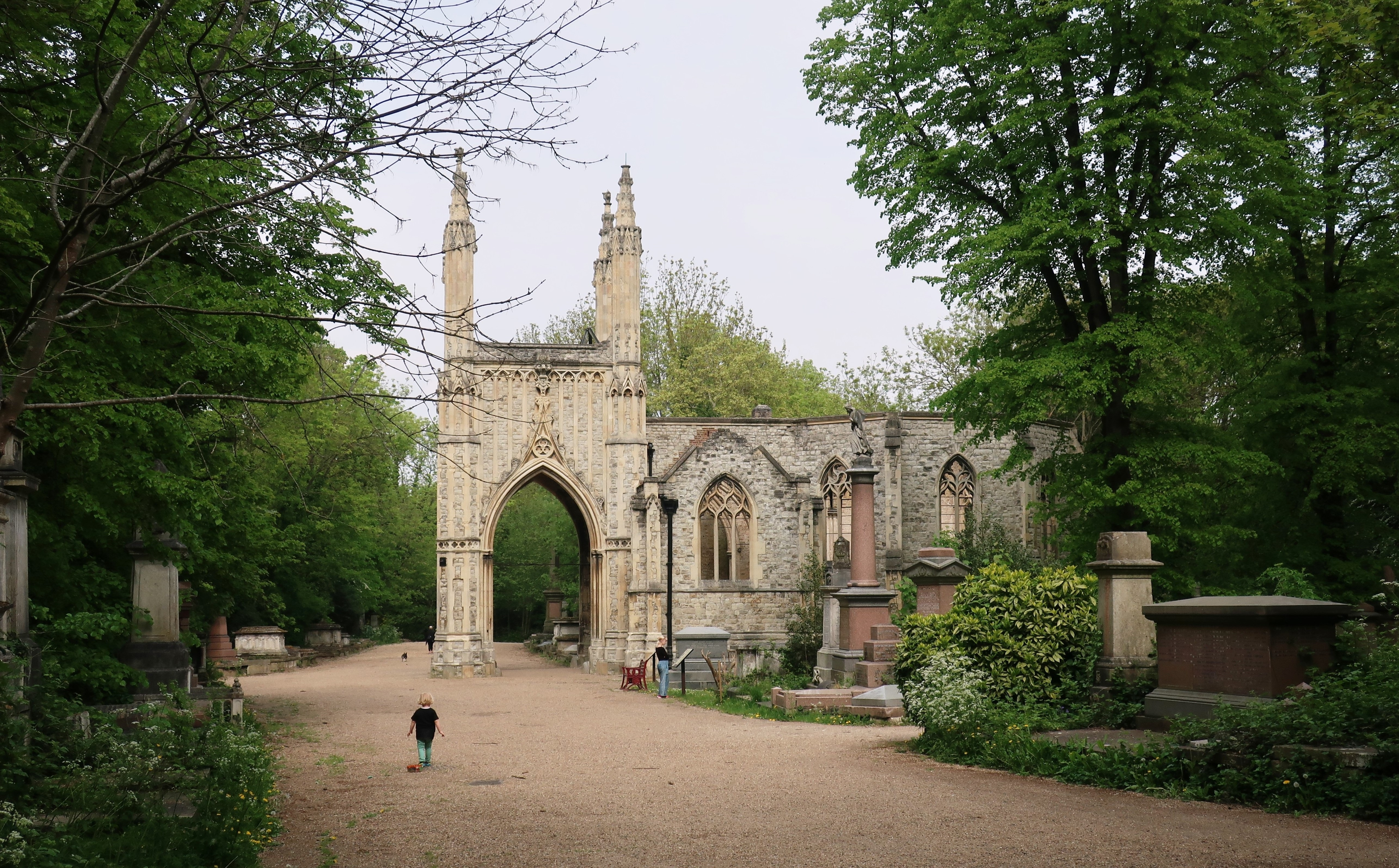
The Anglican Chapel from the west

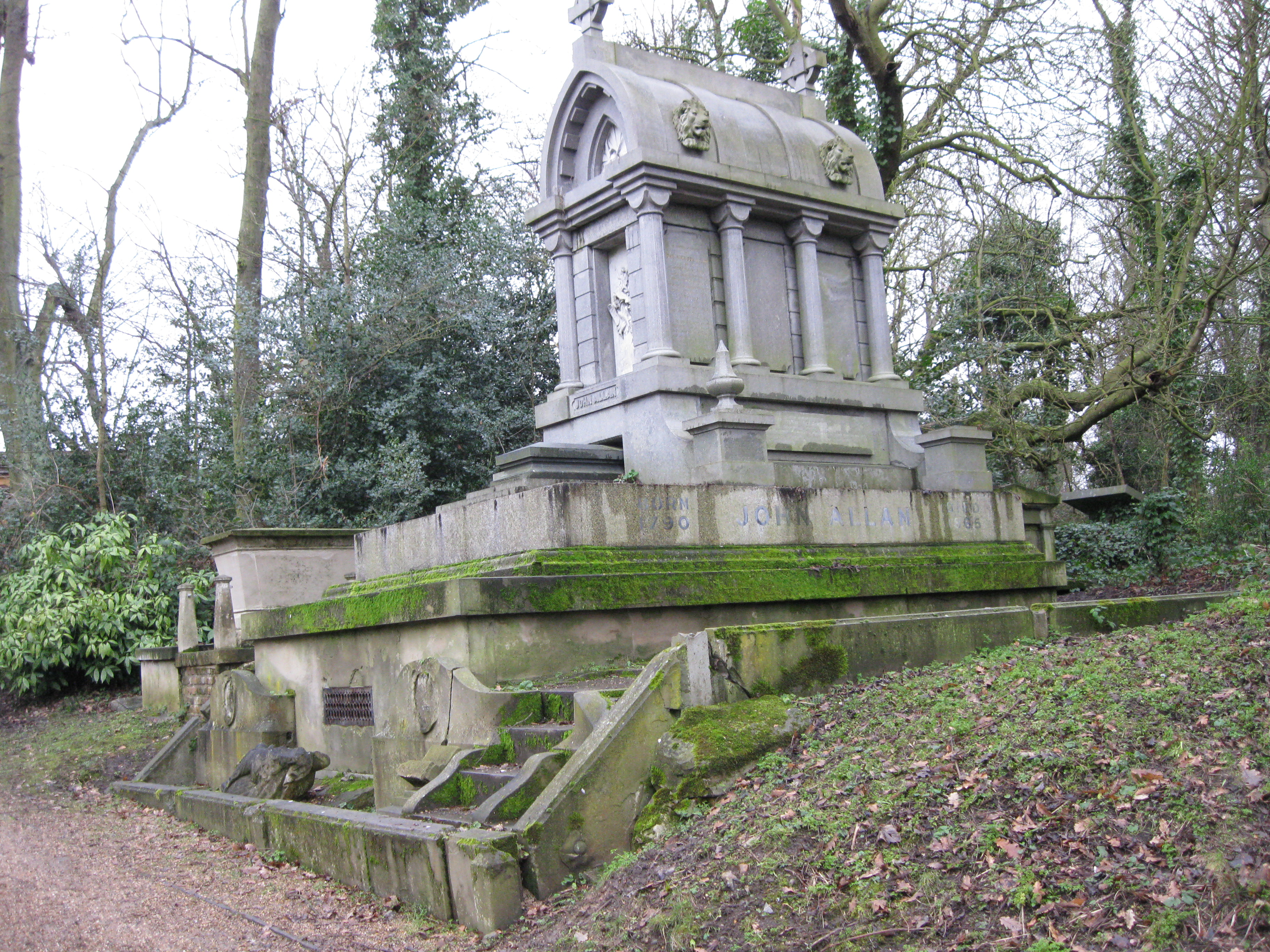
Monument to John Allan (d. 1865)

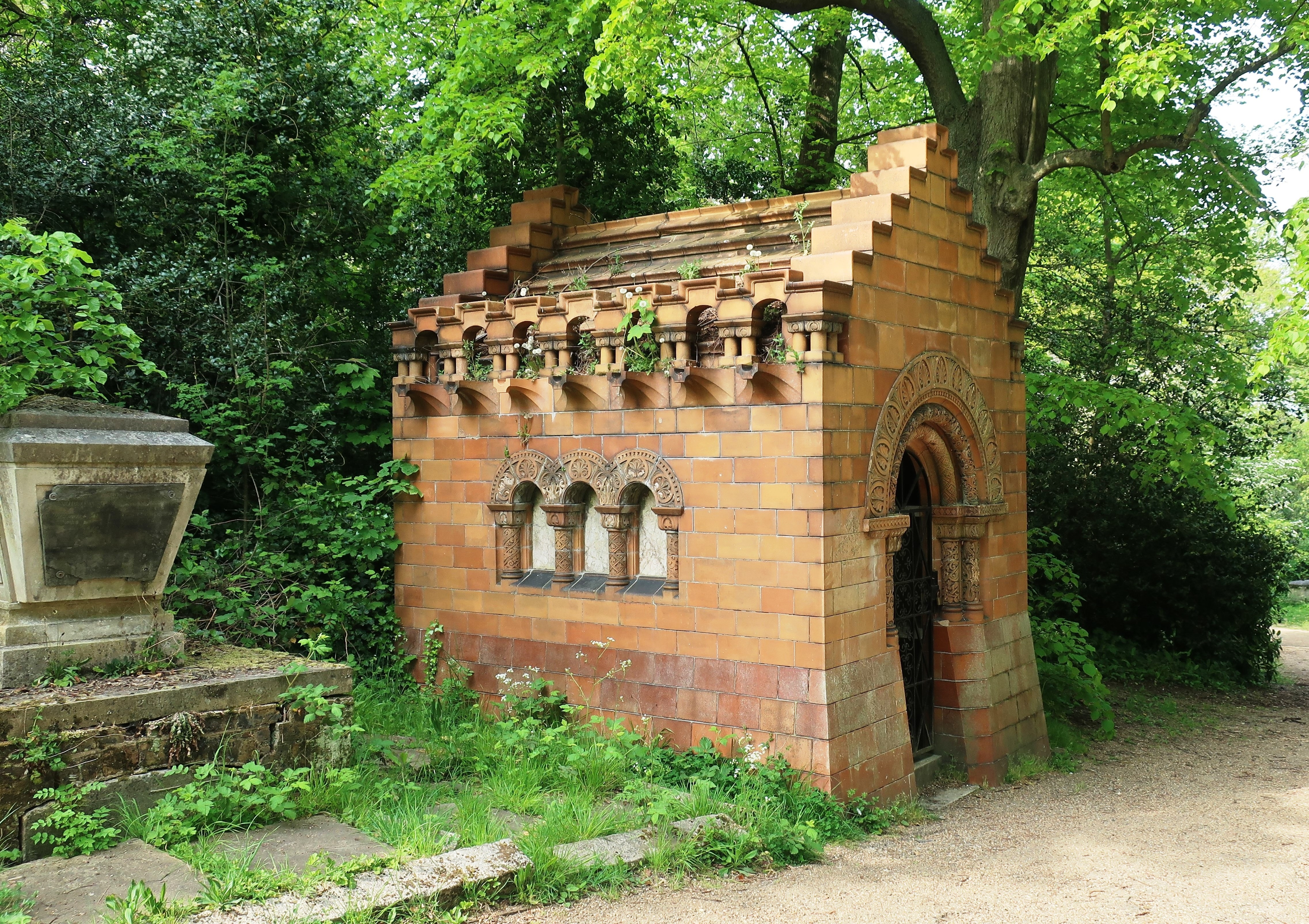
Mausoleum of Laura Stearns (d. 1900)

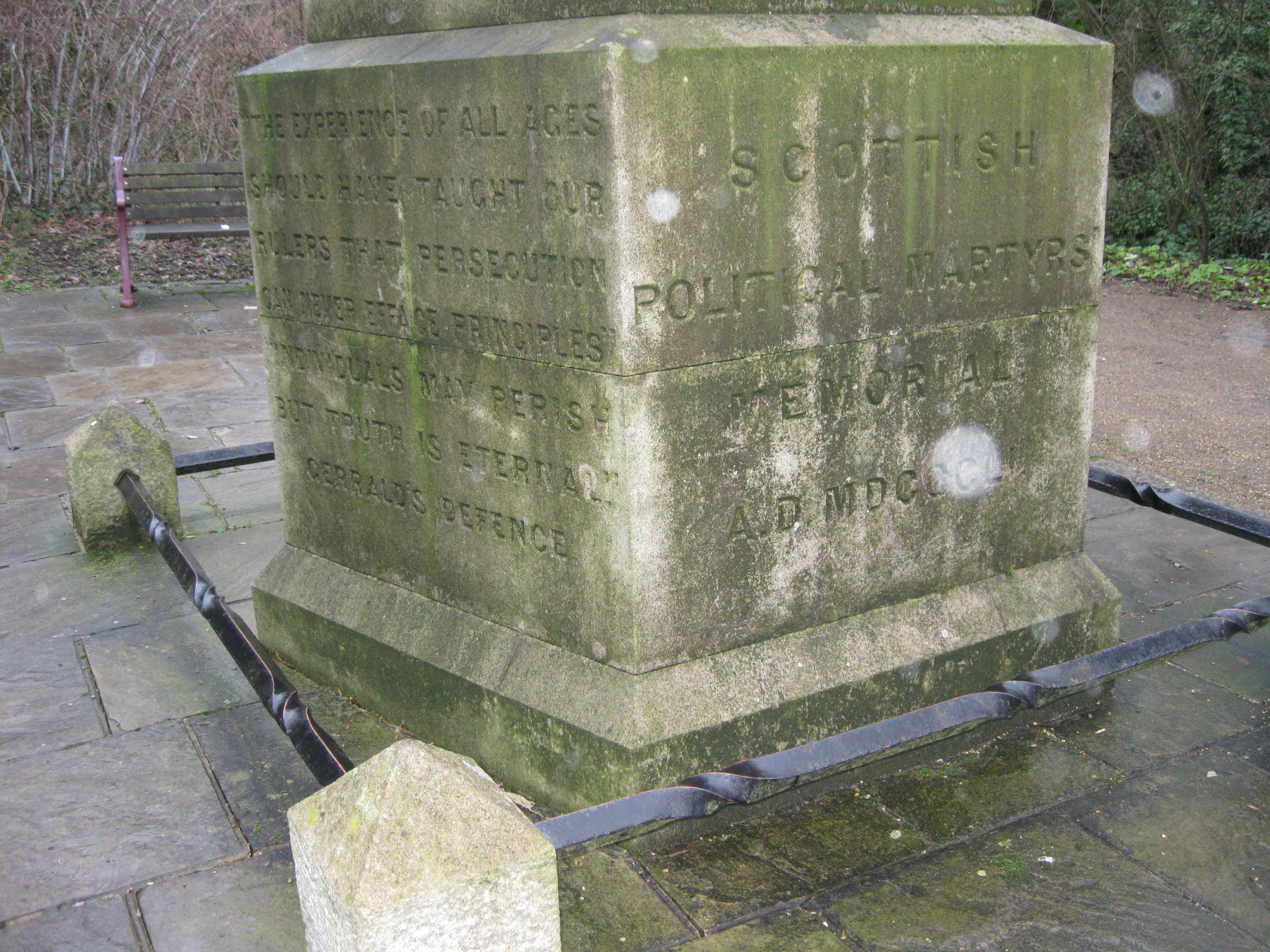
The base of the Scottish Martyrs Memorial

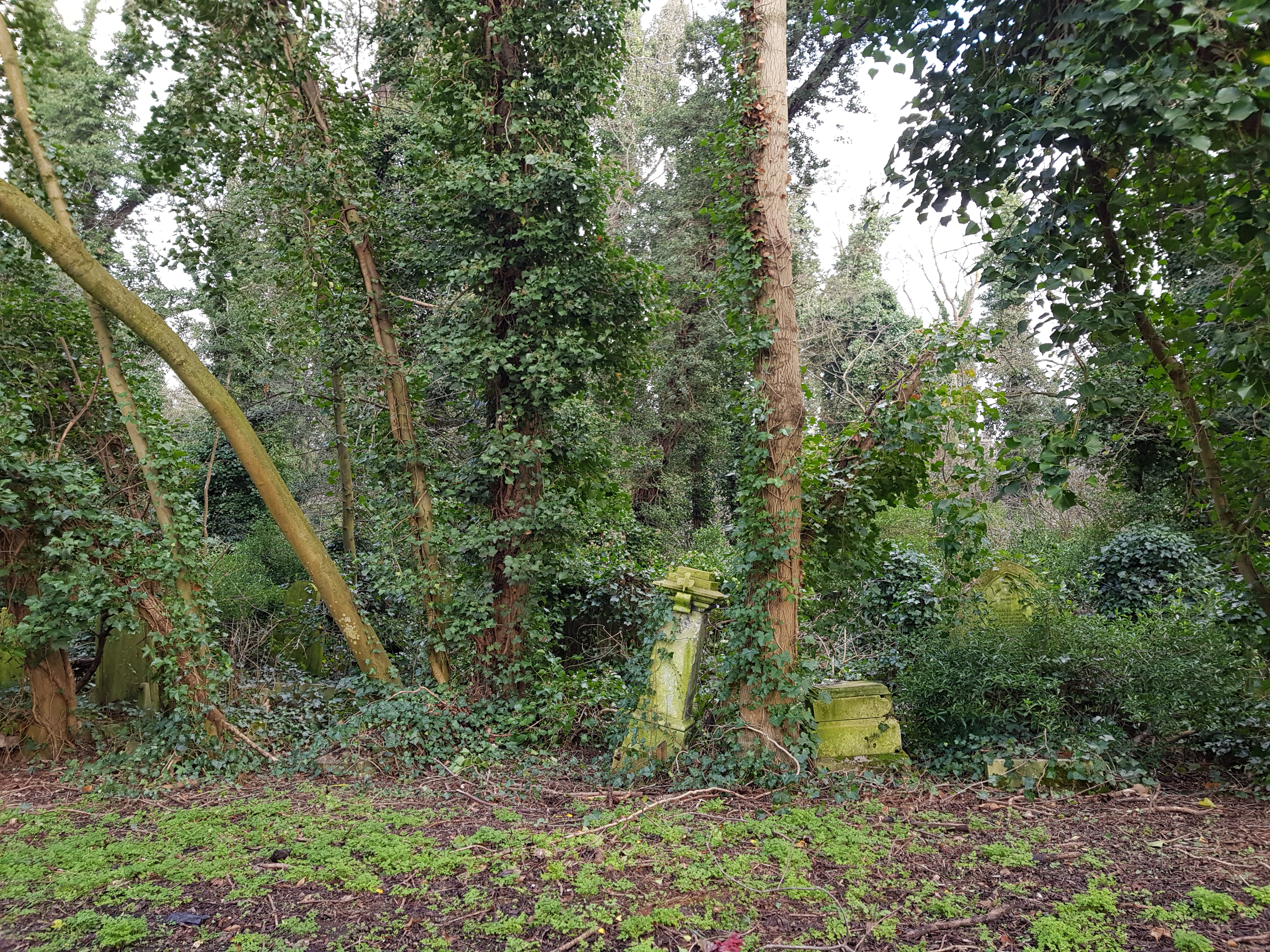
Scene in the cemetery, January 2018

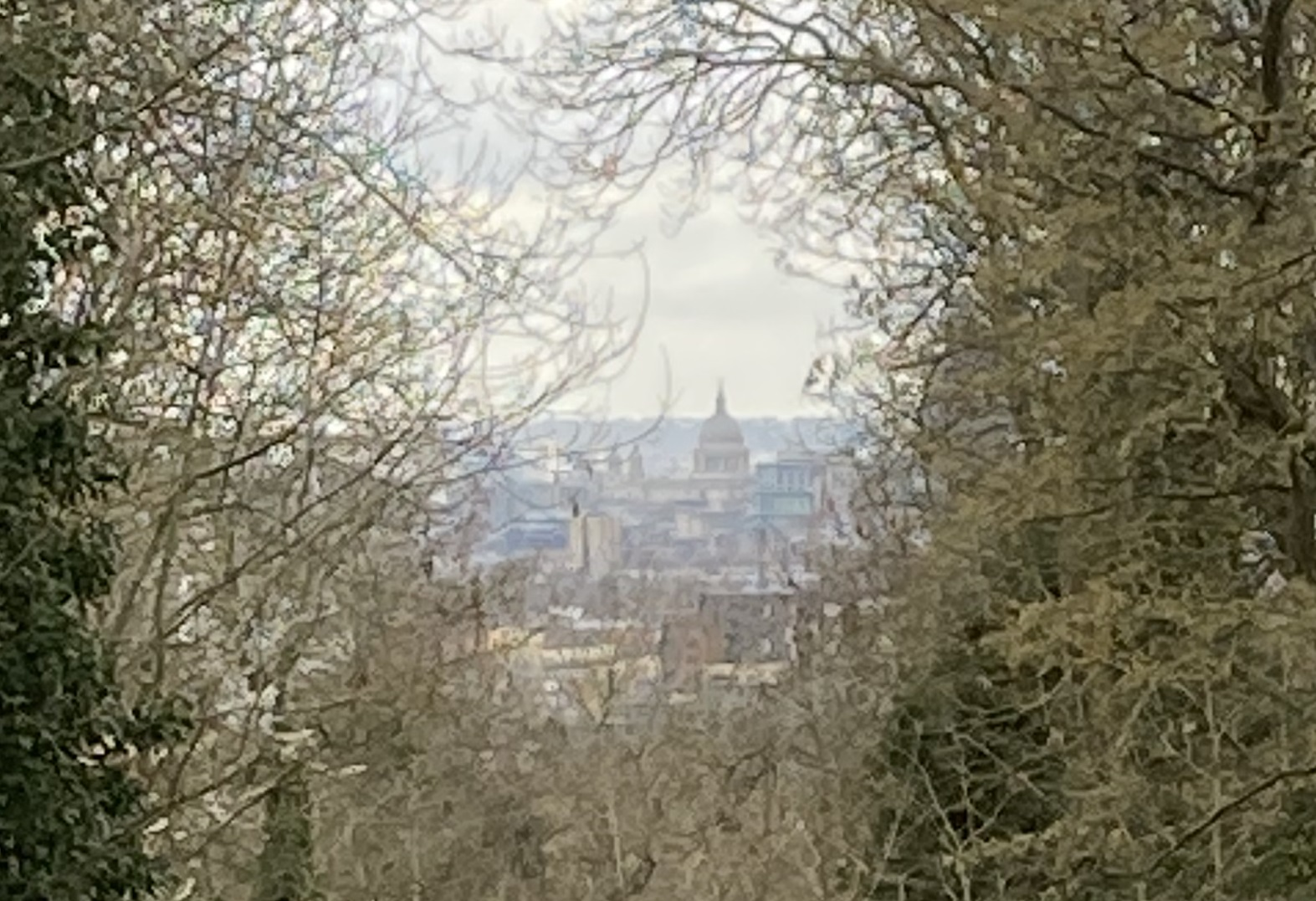
The view of St Paul's Cathedral from the upper part of the Cemetery

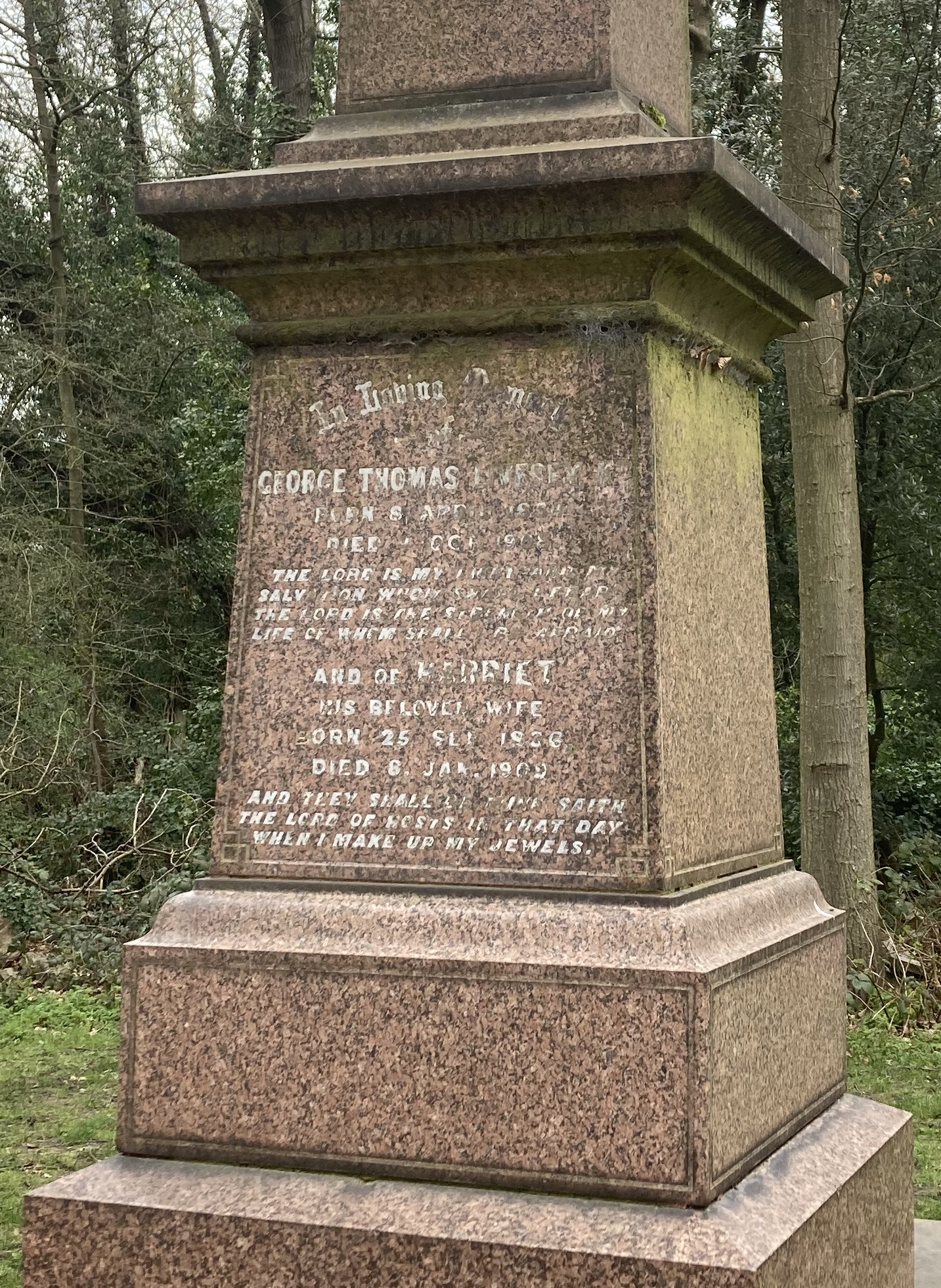
Grave of Sir George Livesey

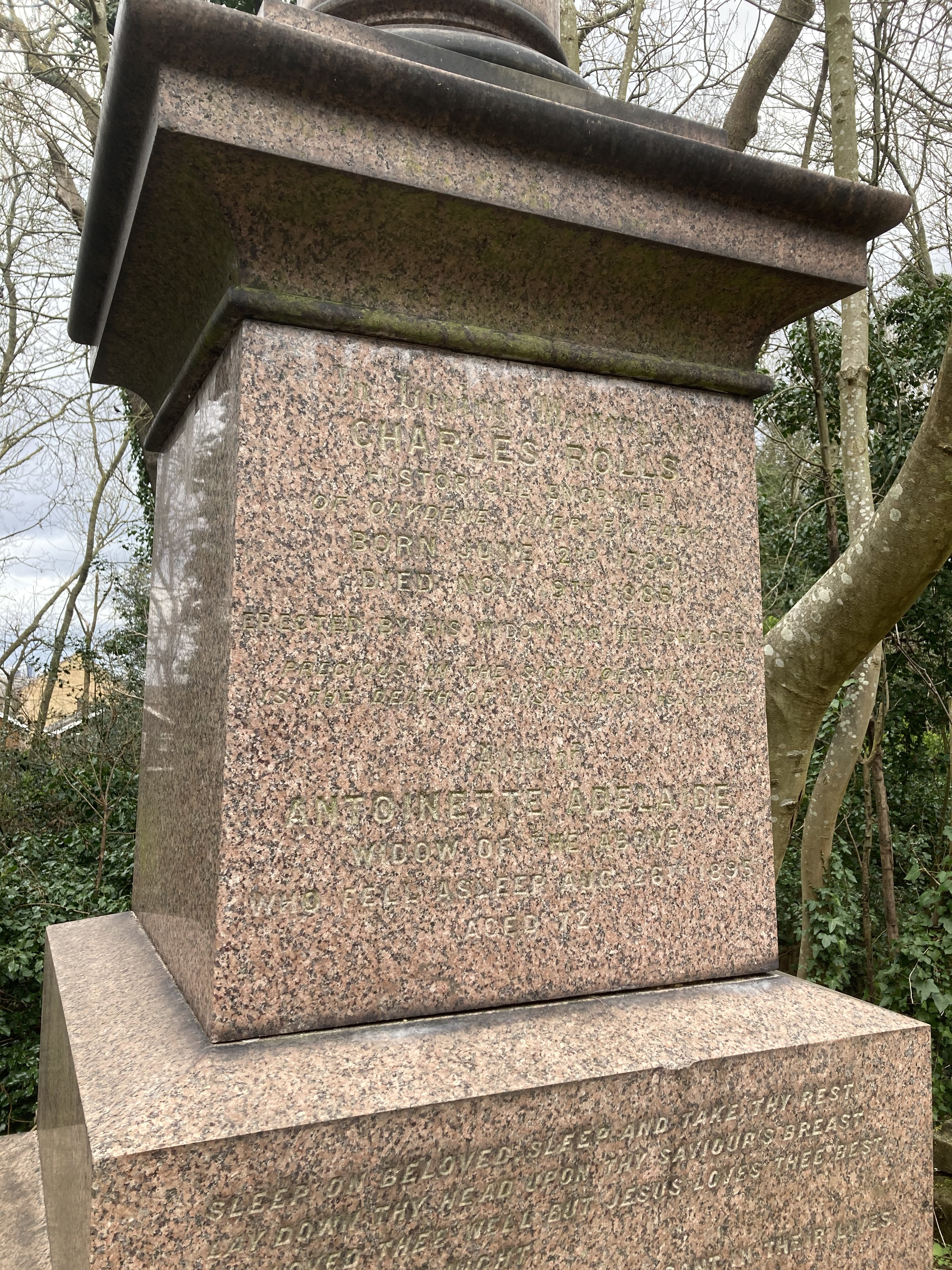
Grave of Charles Rolls
