= Fulham Road Jewish Cemetery =

Cemetery in London

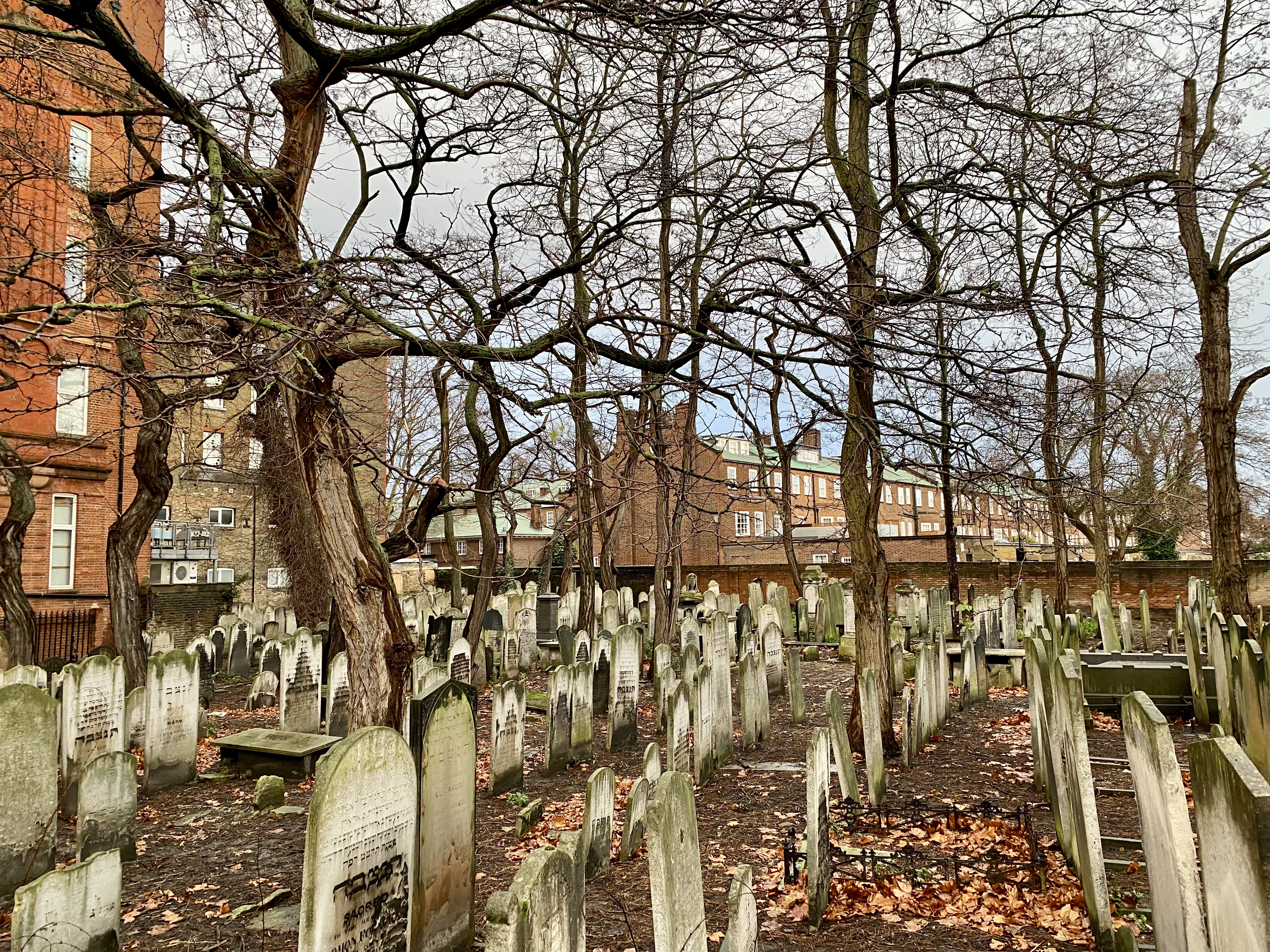
- The cemetery in 2023
- Interactive map of Fulham Road Jewish Cemetery

Details
- Established: 1815
- Location: Fulham Road (London Borough of Kensington and Chelsea), London SW3
- Country: England
- Coordinates: 51°29′22″N 0°10′30″W
- Type: Orthodox Jewish
- Owned by: Western Charitable Foundation
- Size: 1 acre (0.40 ha)
- Website: Official website
- Find a Grave: Fulham Road Jewish Cemetery

The Fulham Road Jewish Cemetery (also called Fulham Cemetery and formerly known as the Brompton Jewish Cemetery) is a Jewish cemetery on Fulham Road in the Royal Borough of Kensington and Chelsea. A locked door on the Fulham Road serves as the entrance to the cemetery, otherwise it is not visible from the street. The cemetery is overlooked by the blocks of flats that surround it.

Ash and plane trees are planted at the cemetery, which is 1 acre (0.40 ha) in size. It has been described as a "tiny" cemetery that is "totally unexpected in the Fulham Road" and creates an impression "more typical of Prague than London".

The cemetery is owned by the Western Charitable Foundation, and is open only by appointment.

== History ==
It was opened in 1815 as the burial ground for the Western Synagogue, now Western Marble Arch Synagogue. The site was purchased in December 1815 for £400. An office building and prayer hall originally stood near the entrance. The cemetery closed in 1885 although burials in reserved plots continued until 1910.

It was the first Jewish burial ground west of the City of London. It was restored in 1898 funded by a Mr Ellis Franklin, whose parents were buried here, with the maintenance of the cemetery funded by £20,000 from the estate of Adel Hopkins (née Rootstein). The Edmonton cemetery was subsequently established by the Western Synagogue in 1884.

== Notable burials ==
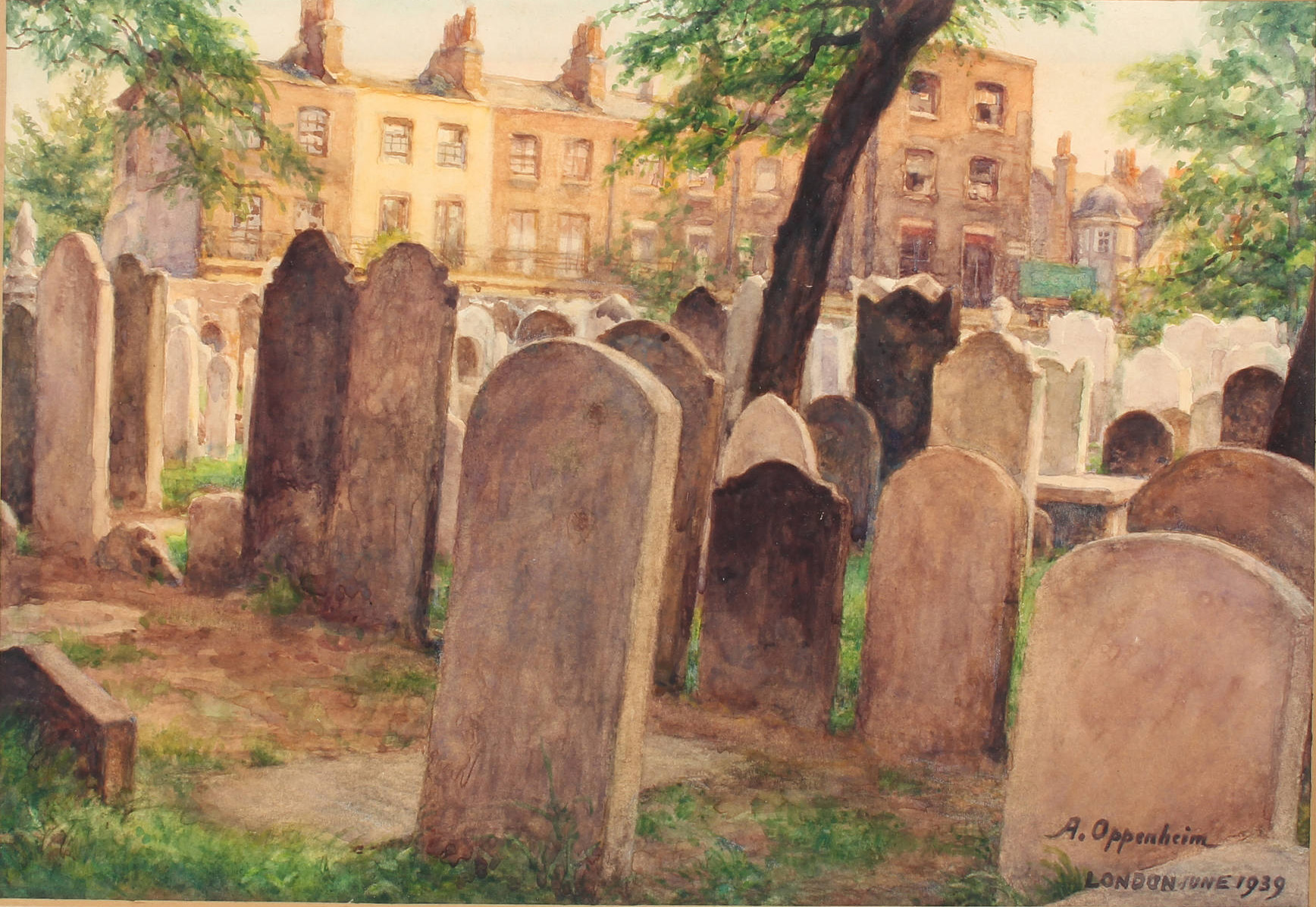
Gouache by Alfred Nathaniel Oppenheim, 1934

- Herschell Filipowski (1816–1872), Lithuanian-born Hebraist, editor, mathematician, linguist and actuary who was elected a Fellow of the Society of Antiquaries of London
- Solomon Hart (1806–1881), artist and professor of painting at the Royal Academy (RA) from 1854 to 1863. Hart was the first Jewish member of the RA
- Zadok Jessel (1792–1864), businessman and the father of the Master of the Rolls Sir George Jessel
- Joseph Waley (1818–1873), first president of the Anglo-Jewish Association and professor of political economy at London University
- Simon Waley (1827–1875), stockbroker, pianist and composer

== See also ==
- Jewish cemeteries in the London area
