= Kemnal Park Cemetery & Memorial Gardens =

Cemetery in London, England

Coordinates: 51°25′39.1″N 0°5′2.9″E

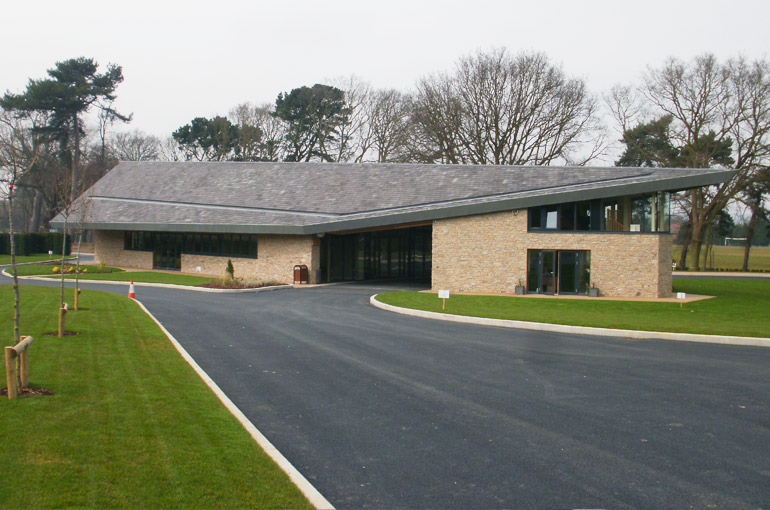
Kemnal Park Cemetery, non-denominational chapel.

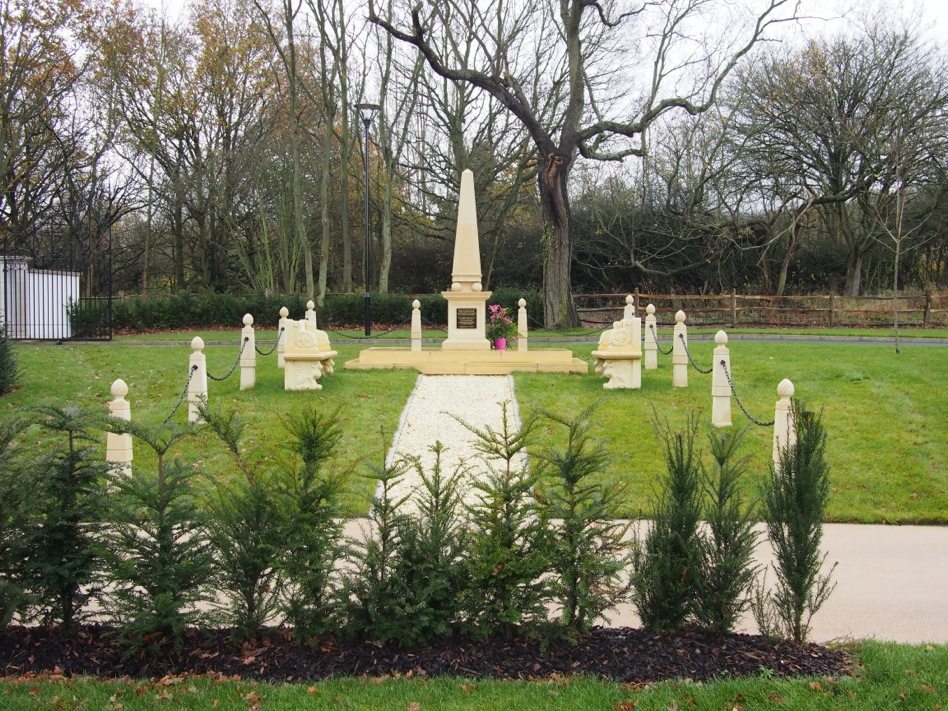
Kemnal Park Cemetery, Monument to the Unknown Parishioner of the Borough of Southwark.

Kemnal Park Cemetery & Memorial Gardens is a privately owned cemetery in London that was opened in October 2013 by the Mayor of Bromley, Cllr Ernest Noad. It comprises 55 acres in total and in addition to the available 30,000 burial plots, features a garden of remembrance, a non-denominational chapel and car parking. Near to the cemetery entrance is a monument to ‘the Unknown Parishioner of the Borough of Southwark’. This person's remains were moved to the cemetery from the former St Saviour's Almshouse burial ground during the construction of the Thameslink Programme rail project. The cemetery is also listed as a 'site of special interest' due to its ancient woodland and diverse bird life. In April 2014, Kemnal Park became the first cemetery in the UK to offer live web streaming of services.

== Location ==
The cemetery is located near Chislehurst and Foxbury, in the London Borough of Bromley and is adjacent to and accessed from the south-westerly side of the A20 Sidcup Bypass. It is approximately 5.5 miles WNW of Junction 3 of the M25 motorway.

== History ==
The cemetery is located in what was previously the Kemnal House Estate. A series of houses were built in this location, the first being mentioned in deeds in 1250 and the last being destroyed by fire in 1964. From 1964 until work on the new cemetery commenced, the site remained derelict.
