= Foxbury =

Coordinates: 51.419657°N 0.088212°E

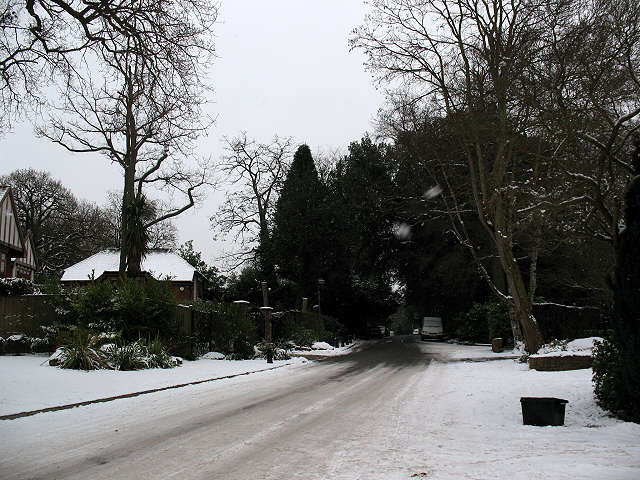
- Kemnal Road running through Foxbury, January 2010

- Location within Greater London
- OS grid reference: TQ446713
  - Charing Cross: 9 mi (14.5 km) NW
- London borough: Bromley
- Ceremonial county: Greater London
- Region: London
- Country: England
- Sovereign state: United Kingdom
- Post town: Chislehurst
- Postcode district: BR7
- Dialling code: 020
- Police: Metropolitan
- Fire: London
- Ambulance: London
- UK Parliament: Eltham and Chislehurst
- London Assembly: Bexley and Bromley

Foxbury is an area in the London Borough of Bromley, located to the east of Chislehurst. It is home to the Grade II-listed Foxbury Manor, several educational institutes and a number of sports and athletic grounds.
