= Magnificent Seven cemeteries =

Seven large cemeteries in London

Locations of the cemeteries in London

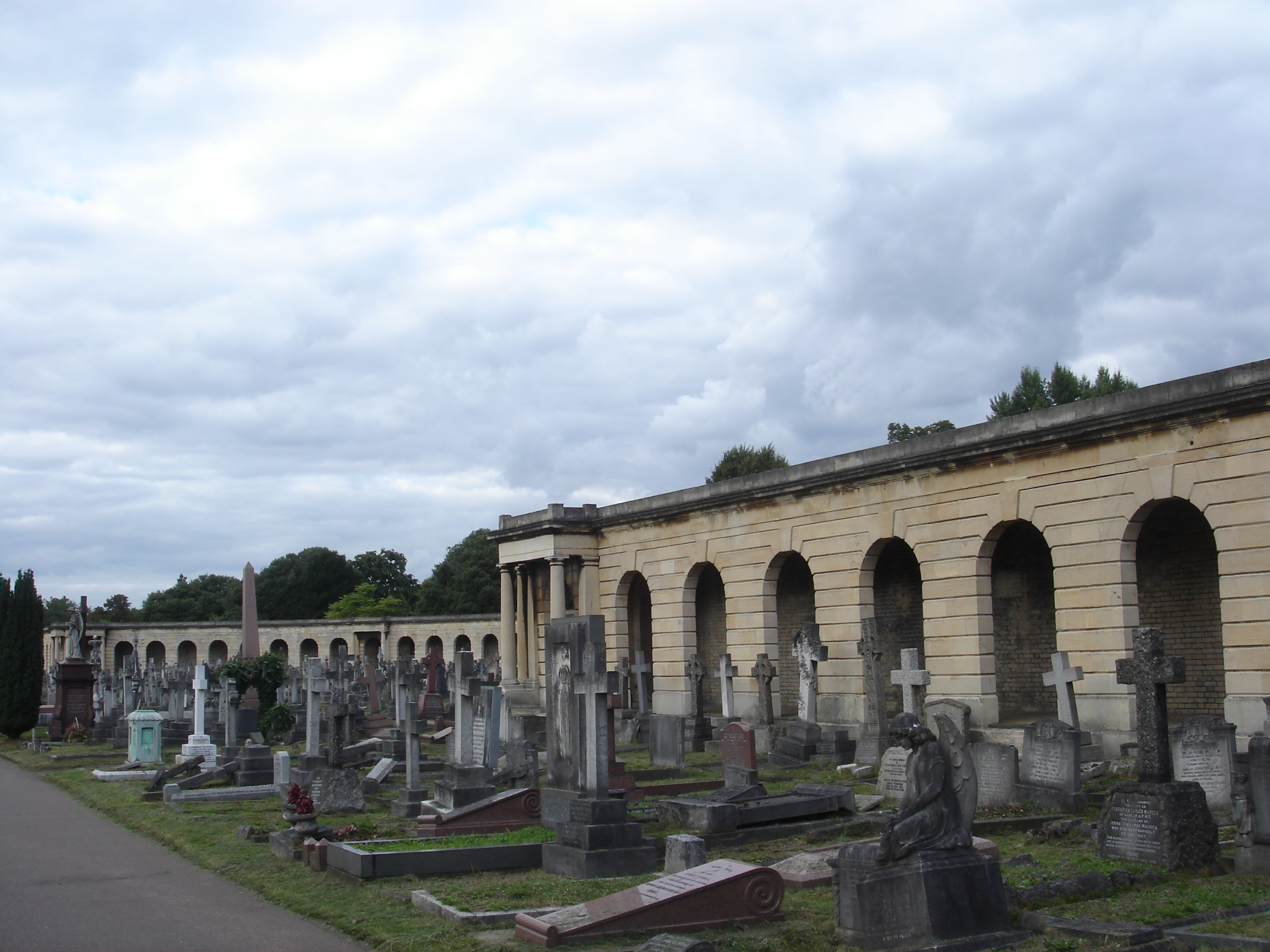
Brompton Cemetery, one of the Magnificent Seven

The Magnificent Seven is an informal term applied to seven large private garden cemeteries in London. These are Kensal Green Cemetery, West Norwood Cemetery, Highgate Cemetery, Abney Park Cemetery, Brompton Cemetery, Nunhead Cemetery, and Tower Hamlets Cemetery. They were established in the 19th century to alleviate overcrowding in existing parish burial grounds as London's population grew during the Victorian era. In 1981, the architectural historian Hugh Meller dubbed the group of cemeteries "The Magnificent Seven" after the 1960 western film of the same name.

== History ==
=== Background ===
For hundreds of years, almost all London's dead were buried in small parish churchyards, which became dangerously overcrowded. Architects such as Sir Christopher Wren and Sir John Vanbrugh deplored this practice and wished to see suburban cemeteries established. It was not until British visitors to Paris, including George Frederick Carden, were inspired by its Père Lachaise cemetery that sufficient time and money were devoted to canvass for reform, and equivalents were developed in London, firstly at Kensal Green.

In the first 50 years of the 19th century, the population of London more than doubled, from 1 million to 2.3 million. Overcrowded graveyards also led to decaying matter getting into the water supply and causing epidemics. There were incidents of graves being dug on unmarked plots that already contained bodies, and of bodies being defiled by sewer rats infiltrating the churchyards' drains from the relatively central Tyburn, Fleet, Effra and Westbourne rivers which were used as foul sewers by this date and later wholly discharged into London's outfall sewers.

=== Establishment ===
In 1832, Parliament passed an act encouraging the establishment of private cemeteries outside central London. Over the next decade seven cemeteries were established, at least four of which were consecrated by Charles James Blomfield, Bishop of London.

The Burial Act 1852 (15 & 16 Vict. c. 85) section 9 required new burial grounds in a list of urban parishes of London (the Metropolis) to be approved by the Secretary of State. Sections 1 and 44 enabled the Secretary of State to close metropolitan London churchyards to new interments and make regulations regarding proper burial. The expenses for establishing burial boards to accommodate these changes were ordered to come from the poor rates under section 19. Sections 26 and 28 of that act enabled parish Burial Boards (with vestry approval) to purchase land anywhere and to appropriate land belonging to the relevant parish, poor board or any of its charitable trusts.

For a time following the establishment of the cemeteries, it became a semi-established custom for visitors to the cemeteries to picnic among the graves; their suburban locations made them especially popular.

== List ==
| Name | Year opened | Location | London borough | Postal area | Active | Notes | "Friends" |
|---|---|---|---|---|---|---|---|
| Kensal Green Cemetery | 1833 | 51.5286°N 0.2241°W | Royal Borough of Kensington and Chelsea | W10 | Yes | Originally known as the General Cemetery of All Souls, this is the oldest of the Magnificent Seven cemeteries and it is still in operation. | Yes |
| West Norwood Cemetery | 1837 | 51.4330°N 0.0986°W | London Borough of Lambeth | SE27 | Partially (Note: Closed to new burials, but still used for cremations. Burial in family plots is still possible.) | Originally known as the South Metropolitan Cemetery, this was the first cemetery in the world to use the Gothic style. | Yes |
| Highgate Cemetery | 1839 (West); 1860 (East) | 51.567°N 0.147°W | London Borough of Camden | N6, N19 | Yes | It is divided into East and West cemeteries. | Yes |
| Abney Park Cemetery | 1840 | 51.5649°N 0.0781°W | London Borough of Hackney | N16 | Yes | It became the main burial place of English nonconformists when Bunhill Fields closed. | Yes |
| Brompton Cemetery | 1840 | 51.4849°N 0.1908°W | Royal Borough of Kensington and Chelsea | SW10 | Yes | Owned by the Crown, it is managed by The Royal Parks. | Yes |
| Nunhead Cemetery | 1840 | 51.4642°N 0.0530°W | London Borough of Southwark | SE15 | Yes | It was originally known as "All Saints' Cemetery". | Yes |
| Tower Hamlets Cemetery | 1841 | 51.5237°N 0.0304°W | London Borough of Tower Hamlets | E3 | No | Also known as Bow Cemetery, it closed to new burials in 1966, and is now a designated local nature reserve. | Yes |

== See also ==
- List of cemeteries in London
