= Lauriston Road Cemetery =

Cemetery in London

- Interactive map of Lauriston Road Cemetery

Details
- Established: 1788
- Location: Lauriston Road, South Hackney, (London Borough of Hackney), London E9
- Country: England
- Coordinates: 51°32′16″N 0°02′37″W
- Type: Orthodox Jewish
- Owned by: United Synagogue Burial Society
- Size: 2.25 acres (0.91 ha)
- Website: Lauriston Road Cemetery
- Find a Grave: Lauriston Road Cemetery

The Lauriston Road Cemetery is an historic Grade II listed Jewish cemetery on Lauriston Road in South Hackney. The cemetery opened in 1788, having been purchased by the Germans' Hambro Synagogue in 1786. It was closed to further burials from 1886.

The cemetery is open to visitors by appointment only.

The London Garden Trust notes that there are "notable plane, and other semi-mature trees in the grounds, and numerous headstones and chest tombs set in grass."

== History ==
There are records of a small Sephardic Jewish community in Hackney from the 18th century. After the first cemetery belonging to the Hambro Synagogue was closed in Hoxton Street in 1878 (and no longer exists), land east of Grove Road was bought by Leon Gompertz and other Ashkenazim acting on behalf of the synagogue. The land included a building, part of which was occupied by Sarah Tyssen (d. 1779), widow of Samuel Tyssen. When the cemetery was opened the Hackney area was largely undeveloped and the grounds served as a rural retreat with little changing until the arrival of the railways in the 1850s, allowing much faster connections to the City of London. The cemetery was extended in 1852 to the front but the grounds soon became dilapidated. In 1870 renovations of the cemetery took place, funded by Mrs Flatou to the sum of £1,200 in memory of her late husband Louis Victor Flatou.

The last funeral at Lauriston Road took place in 2003, the interment of the cemetery’s last caretaker, the long-serving Janet Samson who had lived in the lodge.

== Grave records ==
In autumn 2025 Willesden Jewish Cemetery and Caring for God's Acre ran volunteer project to preserve the heritage of the burial ground. Online training sessions and onsite activity aimed to record and photograph the gravestones to ensure that the names and stories in this important cemetery are remembered for future generations.

== Buildings and architecture ==
The lodge (designed by H H Collins), walls and gates built in 1870 remain at the entrance to the grounds.

The lodge had for many years been used as the residence of the cemetery keeper, after their passing it has been privately let with some record of it being used as a doctor's surgery as well as offices in 2021. As of 2025 the building is residential once again.

According to Hackney Council's planning department documents "The lodge building forms a group of buildings fronting onto Lauriston Road, it is attached to the adjoining property but is set back from the road to emphasise its separation from the road and link to the cemetery to the side and rear. The lodge is an ‘L’ shaped two-storey Victorian property built to mimic a Victorian villa but in a compressed form. The building is locally listed and is located within the Victoria Park Conservation Area."

In 1885, the prayer hall which stood next to the lodge was demolished despite its having been renovated only 15 years earlier.

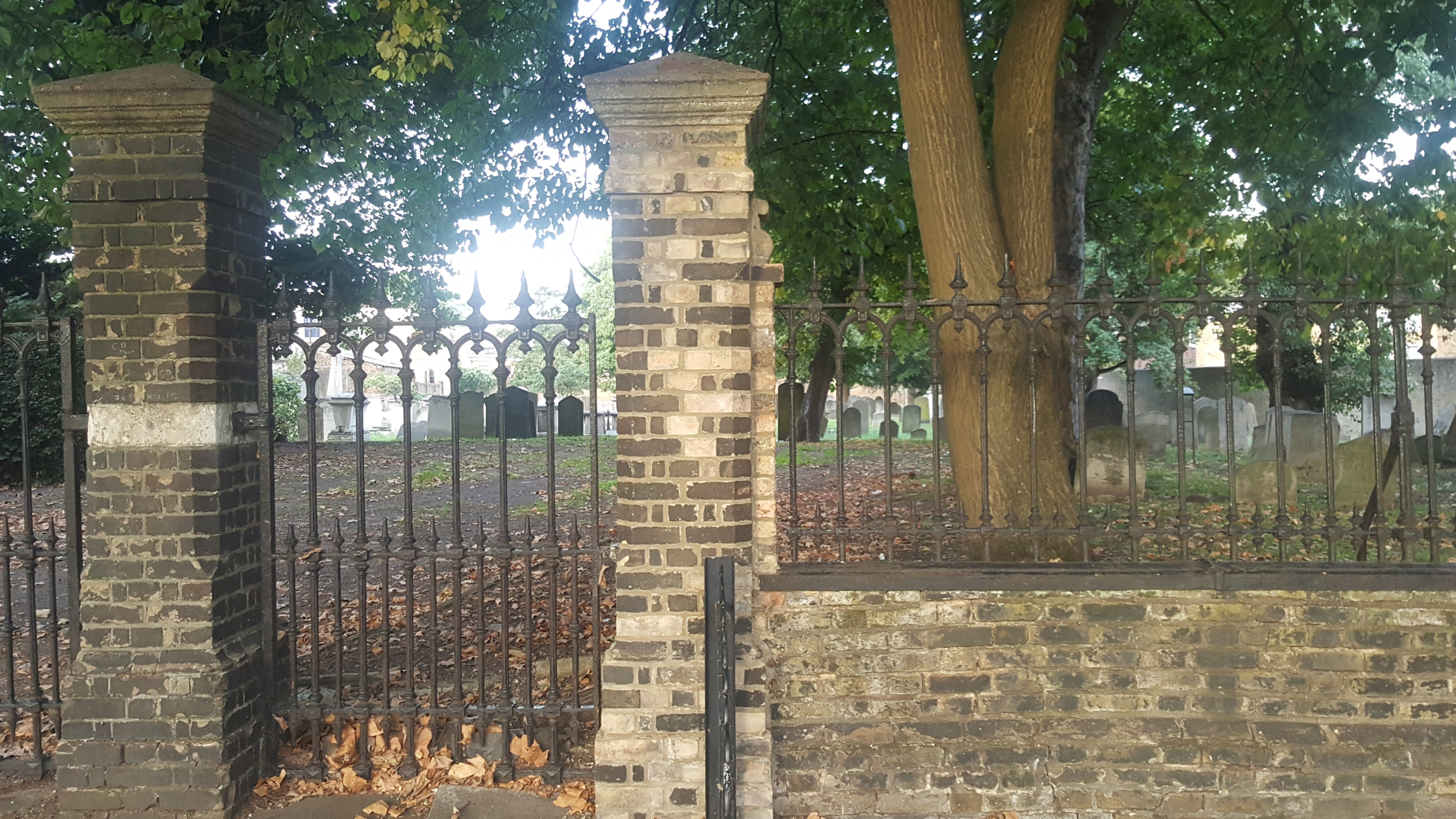
Lauriston Road Cemetery, 2023

== Heritage listing ==
The surviving lodge, gates and railings are all locally listed by Hackney Council. The cemetery site also lies at the centre of the Victoria Park Conservation Area as designated by the Council. In March 2021 Historic England listed, at Grade II, the whole of the cemetery along with "the lodge, gates and piers facing Lauriston Road and portion of the walling to the south of the graveyard".

The listing recognises the cemetery "has a lodge building, walls, railings and gates of 1870 by HH Collins" which are all well preserved and a rare survival from the period especially as a group. The listing recognises the importance of the cemetery for its architectural interest in the collection of 18th-century and 19th-century headstones and monuments along with the development of Jewish burial customs and assimilation into British society. Of historical interest is that the burial ground "was the first Jewish cemetery site in London to be laid out in a rural setting, beyond the initial cluster around Whitechapel".

== Environment ==
Hackney Council lists the burial ground as "a haven for insects, birds and small mammals" with "a number of mature trees and shrubs". The council goes on to describe the land as one of the most positive features of the conservation area, "an important private open space" and "an important refuge for small wildlife and birds".

== Future development ==
In 2018 Waugh Thistleton Architects were granted permission for the designs of a new contemporary synagogue on the site of the demolished prayer hall. The architects had been commissioned by United Synagogues to design the new multi-purpose building to "cater to the needs of the expanding local Jewish community, serving as a communal space and a forum to inspire dialogue about the Jewish religion and culture with new audiences."

The proposed new building, of engineered timber construction, was granted planning permission by Hackney Council despite opposition from local residents who objected to the potential disruption of local ecosystem and reduction in views across the cemetery from the road. The dissidents' petition, signed by 352 people, stated that local residents view the cemetery as a central part of their local neighbourhood, notwithstanding its status as a private site. The new building would be accompanied by renovation of the existing lodge and a change in its use to a community centre.
