= List of postcode districts in the United Kingdom =

Postcode areas shown with former postal counties

This is a list of postcode districts in the United Kingdom and Crown Dependencies. A group of postcode districts with the same alphabetical prefix is called a postcode area. All, or part, of one or more postcode districts are grouped into post towns.

== Overview ==
Until 1996, Royal Mail required counties to be included in addresses, except for 110 of the larger post towns. For these "special post towns", the former postal county is shown in brackets below. Since 1996, counties are not required for any address.

Postcode district codes are also known as "outward codes".

== Areas ==
Postcodes and their namesakes
Postcode	Namesake
AB	Aberdeen
AL	St Albans
B	Birmingham
BA	Bath
BB	Blackburn
BD	Bradford
BH	Bournemouth
BL	Bolton
BN	Brighton
BR	Bromley
BS	Bristol
BT	Belfast
CA	Carlisle
CB	Cambridge
CF	Cardiff
CH	Chester
CM	Chelmsford
CO	Colchester
CR	Croydon
CT	Canterbury
CV	Coventry
CW	Crewe
DA	Dartford
DD	Dundee
DE	Derby
DG	Dumfries and Galloway
DH	Durham
DL	Darlington
DN	Doncaster
DT	Dorchester
DY	Dudley
E	East London
EC	East Central London
EH	Edinburgh
EX	Exeter
FK	Falkirk
FY	Fylde
G	Glasgow
GL	Gloucester
GU	Guildford
GY	Guernsey
HA	Harrow
HD	Huddersfield
HG	Harrogate
HP	Hemel Hempstead
HR	Hereford
HS	Outer Hebrides
HU	Hull
HX	Halifax
IG	Ilford and Chigwell
IM	Isle of Man
IP	Ipswich
IV	Inverness
JE	Jersey
KA	Kilmarnock
KT	Kingston upon Thames
KW	Kirkwall
KY	Kirkcaldy
L	Liverpool
LA	Lancaster
LD	Llandrindod Wells
LE	Leicester
LL	Llandudno
LN	Lincoln
LS	Leeds
M	Manchester
ME	Medway
MK	Milton Keynes
ML	Motherwell
N	North London
NE	Newcastle
NG	Nottingham
NN	Northampton
NP	Newport
NR	Norwich
NW	North West London
OL	Oldham
OX	Oxford
PA	Paisley
PE	Peterborough
PH	Perth
PL	Plymouth
PO	Portsmouth
PR	Preston
RG	Reading
RH	Redhill
RM	Romford
S	Sheffield
SA	Swansea
SE	South East London
SG	Stevenage
SK	Stockport
SL	Slough
SN	Swindon
SO	Southampton
SP	Salisbury Plain
SR	Sunderland
SS	Southend-on-Sea
ST	Stoke-on-Trent
SW	South West London
SY	Shrewsbury
TA	Taunton
TD	Tweeddale
TF	Telford
TN	Tunbridge Wells
TQ	Torquay
TR	Truro
TS	Tees
TW	Twickenham
UB	Uxbridge
W	West London
WA	Warrington
WC	West Central London
WD	Watford
WF	Wakefield
WN	Wigan
WS	Walsall
WV	Wolverhampton
YO	York
ZE	Shetland Islands
(GX)	(Gibraltar)

Postcode area	Postcode districts	Post town	Former postal county
AB	AB10, AB11, AB12, AB15, AB16, AB21, AB22, AB23, AB24, AB25, AB99^{non-geo}	Aberdeen	Aberdeenshire
AB	AB13	Milltimber	Aberdeenshire
AB	AB14	Peterculter	Aberdeenshire
AB	AB30	Laurencekirk	Kincardineshire
AB	AB31	Banchory	Kincardineshire
AB	AB32	Westhill	Aberdeenshire
AB	AB33	Alford	Aberdeenshire
AB	AB34	Aboyne	Aberdeenshire
AB	AB35	Ballater	Aberdeenshire
AB	AB36	Strathdon	Aberdeenshire
AB	AB37	Ballindalloch	Banffshire
AB	AB38	Aberlour	Banffshire
AB	AB39	Stonehaven	Kincardineshire
AB	AB41	Ellon	Aberdeenshire
AB	AB42	Peterhead	Aberdeenshire
AB	AB43	Fraserburgh	Aberdeenshire
AB	AB44	Macduff	Banffshire
AB	AB45	Banff	Banffshire
AB	AB51	Inverurie	Aberdeenshire
AB	AB52	Insch	Aberdeenshire
AB	AB53	Turriff	Aberdeenshire
AB	AB54	Huntly	Aberdeenshire
AB	AB55	Keith	Banffshire
AB	AB56	Buckie	Banffshire
AL	AL1, AL2, AL3, AL4	St Albans	Hertfordshire
AL	AL5	Harpenden	Hertfordshire
AL	AL6, AL7^{shared}	Welwyn	Hertfordshire
AL	AL7^{shared}, AL8	Welwyn Garden City	Hertfordshire
AL	AL9, AL10	Hatfield	Hertfordshire
B	B1, B2, B3, B4, B5, B6, B7, B8, B9, B10, B11, B12, B13, B14, B15, B16, B17, B18, B19, B20, B21, B23, B24, B25, B26, B27, B28, B29, B30, B31, B32, B33, B34, B35, B36, B37, B38, B40, B42, B43, B44, B45, B46, B47, B48, B99^{non-geo}	Birmingham	West Midlands
B	B49, B50	Alcester	Warwickshire
B	B60, B61	Bromsgrove	Worcestershire
B	B62, B63	Halesowen	West Midlands
B	B64	Cradley Heath	West Midlands
B	B65	Rowley Regis	West Midlands
B	B66, B67	Smethwick	West Midlands
B	B68, B69	Oldbury	West Midlands
B	B70, B71	West Bromwich	West Midlands
B	B72, B73, B74, B75, B76	Sutton Coldfield	West Midlands
B	B77, B78, B79	Tamworth	Staffordshire
B	B80	Studley	Warwickshire
B	B90, B91, B92, B93, B94	Solihull	West Midlands
B	B95	Henley-in-Arden	Warwickshire
B	B96, B97, B98	Redditch	Worcestershire
BA	BA1, BA2	Bath	Avon
BA	BA3	Radstock	Avon
BA	BA4	Shepton Mallet	Somerset
BA	BA5	Wells	Somerset
BA	BA6	Glastonbury	Somerset
BA	BA7	Castle Cary	Somerset
BA	BA8	Templecombe	Somerset
BA	BA9^{shared}	Wincanton	Somerset
BA	BA9,^{non-geo} ^{shared} BA10	Bruton	Somerset
BA	BA11	Frome	Somerset
BA	BA12	Warminster	Wiltshire
BA	BA13	Westbury	Wiltshire
BA	BA14	Trowbridge	Wiltshire
BA	BA15	Bradford-on-Avon	Wiltshire
BA	BA16	Street	Somerset
BA	BA20, BA21, BA22	Yeovil	Somerset
BB	BB1, BB2, BB6	Blackburn	Lancashire
BB	BB3	Darwen	Lancashire
BB	BB4	Rossendale	Lancashire
BB	BB5	Accrington	Lancashire
BB	BB7	Clitheroe	Lancashire
BB	BB8	Colne	Lancashire
BB	BB9	Nelson	Lancashire
BB	BB10, BB11, BB12	Burnley	Lancashire
BB	BB18, BB94^{non-geo}	Barnoldswick	Lancashire
BD	BD1, BD2, BD3, BD4, BD5, BD6, BD7, BD8, BD9, BD10, BD11, BD12, BD13, BD14, BD15, BD98,^{non-geo} ^{shared} BD99^{non-geo}	Bradford	West Yorkshire
BD	BD16, BD97^{non-geo}	Bingley	West Yorkshire
BD	BD17, BD18, BD98^{non-geo} ^{shared}	Shipley	West Yorkshire
BD	BD19	Cleckheaton	West Yorkshire
BD	BD20, BD21, BD22	Keighley	West Yorkshire
BD	BD23, BD24^{shared}	Skipton	North Yorkshire
BD	BD24^{shared}	Settle	North Yorkshire
BF	BF1^{non-geo}	BFPO	non-geographic
BH	BH1, BH2, BH3, BH4, BH5, BH6, BH7, BH8, BH9, BH10, BH11	Bournemouth	Dorset
BH	BH12, BH13, BH14, BH15, BH16, BH17	Poole	Dorset
BH	BH18	Broadstone	Dorset
BH	BH19	Swanage	Dorset
BH	BH20	Wareham	Dorset
BH	BH21	Wimborne	Dorset
BH	BH22	Ferndown	Dorset
BH	BH23	Christchurch	Dorset
BH	BH24	Ringwood	Hampshire
BH	BH25	New Milton	Hampshire
BH	BH31	Verwood	Dorset
BL	BL0, BL8, BL9	Bury	Lancashire
BL	BL1, BL2, BL3, BL4, BL5, BL6, BL7, BL11,^{non-geo} BL78^{non-geo}	Bolton	Lancashire
BN	BN1, BN2, BN41, BN42, BN45, BN50,^{non-geo} BN51,^{non-geo} BN88^{non-geo}	Brighton	East Sussex
BN	BN3, BN52^{non-geo}	Hove	East Sussex
BN	BN5	Henfield	West Sussex
BN	BN6	Hassocks	West Sussex
BN	BN7, BN8	Lewes	East Sussex
BN	BN9	Newhaven	East Sussex
BN	BN10	Peacehaven	East Sussex
BN	BN11, BN12, BN13, BN14, BN91,^{non-geo} BN99^{non-geo} ^{shared}	Worthing	West Sussex
BN	BN15, BN99^{non-geo} ^{shared}	Lancing	West Sussex
BN	BN16, BN17	Littlehampton	West Sussex
BN	BN18	Arundel	West Sussex
BN	BN20, BN21, BN22, BN23	Eastbourne	East Sussex
BN	BN24	Pevensey	East Sussex
BN	BN25	Seaford	East Sussex
BN	BN26	Polegate	East Sussex
BN	BN27	Hailsham	East Sussex
BN	BN43	Shoreham-by-Sea	West Sussex
BN	BN44	Steyning	West Sussex
BR	BR1, BR2^{shared}	Bromley	Kent
BR	BR2^{shared}	Keston	Kent
BR	BR3	Beckenham	Kent
BR	BR4	West Wickham	Kent
BR	BR5, BR6	Orpington	Kent
BR	BR7	Chislehurst	Kent
BR	BR8	Swanley	Kent
BS	BS0,^{non-geo} BS1, BS2, BS3, BS4, BS5, BS6, BS7, BS8, BS9, BS10, BS11, BS13, BS14, BS15, BS16, BS20, BS30, BS31, BS32, BS34, BS35, BS36, BS37, BS39, BS40, BS41, BS48, BS49, BS80,^{non-geo} BS98,^{non-geo} BS99^{non-geo}	Bristol	Avon
BS	BS21	Clevedon	Avon
BS	BS22, BS23, BS24	Weston-super-Mare	Avon
BS	BS25	Winscombe	Avon
BS	BS26	Axbridge	Somerset
BS	BS27	Cheddar	Somerset
BS	BS28	Wedmore	Somerset
BS	BS29	Banwell	Avon
BT	BT1, BT2, BT3, BT4, BT5, BT6, BT7, BT8, BT9, BT10, BT11, BT12, BT13, BT14, BT15, BT16, BT17, BT29^{shared}	Belfast	County Antrim
BT	BT18	Holywood	County Down
BT	BT19, BT20	Bangor	County Down
BT	BT21	Donaghadee	County Down
BT	BT22, BT23	Newtownards	County Down
BT	BT24	Ballynahinch	County Down
BT	BT25	Dromore	County Down
BT	BT26	Hillsborough	County Down
BT	BT27, BT28	Lisburn	County Antrim
BT	BT29^{shared}	Crumlin	County Antrim
BT	BT30	Downpatrick	County Down
BT	BT31	Castlewellan	County Down
BT	BT32	Banbridge	County Down
BT	BT33	Newcastle	County Down
BT	BT34	Newry	County Down
BT	BT35	Newry	County Armagh
BT	BT36, BT37, BT58^{non-geo}	Newtownabbey	County Antrim
BT	BT38	Carrickfergus	County Antrim
BT	BT39	Ballyclare	County Antrim
BT	BT40	Larne	County Antrim
BT	BT41	Antrim	County Antrim
BT	BT42, BT43, BT44	Ballymena	County Antrim
BT	BT45	Magherafelt	County Londonderry
BT	BT46	Maghera	County Londonderry
BT	BT47, BT48	Londonderry	County Londonderry
BT	BT49	Limavady	County Londonderry
BT	BT51, BT52	Coleraine	County Londonderry
BT	BT53	Ballymoney	County Antrim
BT	BT54	Ballycastle	County Antrim
BT	BT55	Portstewart	County Londonderry
BT	BT56	Portrush	County Antrim
BT	BT57	Bushmills	County Antrim
BT	BT60, BT61	Armagh	County Armagh
BT	BT62, BT63, BT64, BT65, BT66, BT67	Craigavon	County Armagh
BT	BT68	Caledon	County Tyrone
BT	BT69	Aughnacloy	County Tyrone
BT	BT70, BT71	Dungannon	County Tyrone
BT	BT74, BT92, BT93, BT94	Enniskillen	County Fermanagh
BT	BT75	Fivemiletown	County Tyrone
BT	BT76	Clogher	County Tyrone
BT	BT77	Augher	County Tyrone
BT	BT78, BT79	Omagh	County Tyrone
BT	BT80	Cookstown	County Tyrone
BT	BT81	Castlederg	County Tyrone
BT	BT82	Strabane	County Tyrone
BX	varies^{non-geo}	not applicable	non-geographic
CA	CA1, CA2, CA3, CA4, CA5, CA6, CA99^{non-geo}	Carlisle	Cumbria
CA	CA7	Wigton	Cumbria
CA	CA8	Brampton	Cumbria
CA	CA9	Alston	Cumbria
CA	CA10, CA11	Penrith	Cumbria
CA	CA12	Keswick	Cumbria
CA	CA13	Cockermouth	Cumbria
CA	CA14, CA95^{non-geo}	Workington	Cumbria
CA	CA15	Maryport	Cumbria
CA	CA16	Appleby-in-Westmorland	Cumbria
CA	CA17	Kirkby Stephen	Cumbria
CA	CA18	Ravenglass	Cumbria
CA	CA19	Holmrook	Cumbria
CA	CA20	Seascale	Cumbria
CA	CA21	Beckermet	Cumbria
CA	CA22	Egremont	Cumbria
CA	CA23	Cleator	Cumbria
CA	CA24	Moor Row	Cumbria
CA	CA25	Cleator Moor	Cumbria
CA	CA26	Frizington	Cumbria
CA	CA27	St Bees	Cumbria
CA	CA28	Whitehaven	Cumbria
CB	CB1, CB2, CB3, CB4, CB5, CB21, CB22, CB23, CB24, CB25	Cambridge	Cambridgeshire
CB	CB6, CB7	Ely	Cambridgeshire
CB	CB8	Newmarket	Suffolk
CB	CB9	Haverhill	Suffolk
CB	CB10, CB11	Saffron Walden	Essex
CF	CF3, CF5, CF10, CF11, CF14, CF15, CF23, CF24, CF30,^{non-geo} CF91,^{non-geo} CF95,^{non-geo} CF99^{non-geo}	Cardiff	South Glamorgan
CF	CF31, CF32, CF33, CF35	Bridgend	Mid Glamorgan
CF	CF34	Maesteg	Mid Glamorgan
CF	CF36	Porthcawl	Mid Glamorgan
CF	CF37, CF38	Pontypridd	Mid Glamorgan
CF	CF39	Porth	Mid Glamorgan
CF	CF40	Tonypandy	Mid Glamorgan
CF	CF41	Pentre	Mid Glamorgan
CF	CF42	Treorchy	Mid Glamorgan
CF	CF43	Ferndale	Mid Glamorgan
CF	CF44	Aberdare	Mid Glamorgan
CF	CF45	Mountain Ash	Mid Glamorgan
CF	CF46	Treharris	Mid Glamorgan
CF	CF47, CF48	Merthyr Tydfil	Mid Glamorgan
CF	CF61, CF71^{shared}	Llantwit Major	South Glamorgan
CF	CF62, CF63	Barry	South Glamorgan
CF	CF64^{shared}	Dinas Powys	South Glamorgan
CF	CF64^{shared}	Penarth	South Glamorgan
CF	CF71^{shared}	Cowbridge	South Glamorgan
CF	CF72	Pontyclun	Mid Glamorgan
CF	CF81	Bargoed	Mid Glamorgan
CF	CF82	Hengoed	Mid Glamorgan
CF	CF83	Caerphilly	Mid Glamorgan
CH	CH1, CH2, CH3, CH4, CH70,^{non-geo} CH88,^{non-geo} CH99^{non-geo}	Chester	Cheshire
CH	CH5	Deeside	Clwyd
CH	CH6^{shared}	Bagillt	Clwyd
CH	CH6^{shared}	Flint	Clwyd
CH	CH7^{shared}	Buckley	Clwyd
CH	CH7^{shared}	Mold	Clwyd
CH	CH8	Holywell	Clwyd
CH	CH25,^{non-geo} CH41, CH42	Birkenhead	Merseyside
CH	CH26,^{non-geo} CH43	Prenton	Merseyside
CH	CH27,^{non-geo} CH44, CH45	Wallasey	Merseyside
CH	CH28,^{non-geo} CH29,^{non-geo} CH30,^{non-geo} CH31,^{non-geo} CH32,^{non-geo} CH46, CH47, CH48, CH49, CH60, CH61, CH62, CH63	Wirral	Merseyside
CH	CH33,^{non-geo} CH64	Neston	Merseyside
CH	CH34,^{non-geo} CH65, CH66	Ellesmere Port	Merseyside
CM	CM0^{shared}	Burnham-on-Crouch	Essex
CM	CM0^{shared}	Southminster	Essex
CM	CM1, CM2, CM3, CM92,^{non-geo} CM98,^{non-geo} CM99^{non-geo}	Chelmsford	Essex
CM	CM4	Ingatestone	Essex
CM	CM5	Ongar	Essex
CM	CM6, CM7 ^{shared}	Dunmow	Essex
CM	CM7,^{shared} CM77	Braintree	Essex
CM	CM8	Witham	Essex
CM	CM9	Maldon	Essex
CM	CM11, CM12	Billericay	Essex
CM	CM13, CM14, CM15	Brentwood	Essex
CM	CM16	Epping	Essex
CM	CM17, CM18, CM19, CM20	Harlow	Essex
CM	CM21	Sawbridgeworth	Hertfordshire
CM	CM22, CM23	Bishop's Stortford	Hertfordshire
CM	CM24	Stansted	Essex
CO	CO1, CO2, CO3, CO4, CO5, CO6, CO7	Colchester	Essex
CO	CO8	Bures	Suffolk
CO	CO9	Halstead	Essex
CO	CO10	Sudbury	Suffolk
CO	CO11	Manningtree	Essex
CO	CO12	Harwich	Essex
CO	CO13	Frinton-on-Sea	Essex
CO	CO14	Walton-on-the-Naze	Essex
CO	CO15, CO16	Clacton-on-Sea	Essex
CR	CR0, CR9,^{non-geo} CR44,^{non-geo} CR90^{non-geo}	Croydon	Surrey
CR	CR2	South Croydon	Surrey
CR	CR3^{shared}	Caterham	Surrey
CR	CR3^{shared}	Whyteleafe	Surrey
CR	CR4	Mitcham	Surrey
CR	CR5	Coulsdon	Surrey
CR	CR6	Warlingham	Surrey
CR	CR7	Thornton Heath	Surrey
CR	CR8^{shared}	Kenley	Surrey
CR	CR8^{shared}	Purley	Surrey
CT	CT1, CT2, CT3, CT4	Canterbury	Kent
CT	CT5	Whitstable	Kent
CT	CT6	Herne Bay	Kent
CT	CT7, CT9^{non-geo} ^{shared}	Birchington	Kent
CT	CT8	Westgate-on-Sea	Kent
CT	CT9^{shared}	Margate	Kent
CT	CT10	Broadstairs	Kent
CT	CT11, CT12	Ramsgate	Kent
CT	CT13	Sandwich	Kent
CT	CT14	Deal	Kent
CT	CT15, CT16, CT17	Dover	Kent
CT	CT18, CT19, CT20, CT50^{non-geo}	Folkestone	Kent
CT	CT21	Hythe	Kent
CV	CV1, CV2, CV3, CV4, CV5, CV6, CV7, CV8^{shared}	Coventry	West Midlands
CV	CV8^{shared}	Kenilworth	Warwickshire
CV	CV9	Atherstone	Warwickshire
CV	CV10, CV11, CV13	Nuneaton	Warwickshire
CV	CV12	Bedworth	Warwickshire
CV	CV21, CV22, CV23	Rugby	Warwickshire
CV	CV31, CV32, CV33	Leamington Spa	Warwickshire
CV	CV34, CV35	Warwick	Warwickshire
CV	CV36, CV37^{shared}	Shipston-on-Stour	Warwickshire
CV	CV37^{shared}	Stratford-upon-Avon	Warwickshire
CV	CV47	Southam	Warwickshire
CW	CW1, CW2, CW3, CW4, CW98^{non-geo}	Crewe	Cheshire
CW	CW5	Nantwich	Cheshire
CW	CW6	Tarporley	Cheshire
CW	CW7	Winsford	Cheshire
CW	CW8, CW9	Northwich	Cheshire
CW	CW10	Middlewich	Cheshire
CW	CW11	Sandbach	Cheshire
CW	CW12	Congleton	Cheshire
DA	DA1, DA2, DA4, DA10^{shared}	Dartford	Kent
DA	DA3	Longfield	Kent
DA	DA5	Bexley	Kent
DA	DA6, DA7^{shared}	Bexleyheath	Kent
DA	DA7,^{non-geo} ^{shared} DA16	Welling	Kent
DA	DA8, DA18	Erith	Kent
DA	DA9	Greenhithe	Kent
DA	DA10^{shared}	Swanscombe	Kent
DA	DA11, DA12, DA13	Gravesend	Kent
DA	DA14, DA15	Sidcup	Kent
DA	DA17	Belvedere	Kent
DD	DD1, DD2, DD3, DD4, DD5	Dundee	Angus
DD	DD6^{shared}	Newport-on-Tay	Fife
DD	DD6^{shared}	Tayport	Fife
DD	DD7	Carnoustie	Angus
DD	DD8^{shared}	Forfar	Angus
DD	DD8^{shared}	Kirriemuir	Angus
DD	DD9	Brechin	Angus
DD	DD10	Montrose	Angus
DD	DD11	Arbroath	Angus
DE	DE1, DE3, DE21, DE22, DE23, DE24, DE65, DE72, DE73, DE74, DE99^{non-geo}	Derby	Derbyshire
DE	DE4	Matlock	Derbyshire
DE	DE5	Ripley	Derbyshire
DE	DE6	Ashbourne	Derbyshire
DE	DE7	Ilkeston	Derbyshire
DE	DE11, DE12	Swadlincote	Derbyshire
DE	DE13, DE14, DE15	Burton-on-Trent	Staffordshire
DE	DE45	Bakewell	Derbyshire
DE	DE55	Alfreton	Derbyshire
DE	DE56	Belper	Derbyshire
DE	DE75	Heanor	Derbyshire
DG	DG1, DG2	Dumfries	Dumfriesshire
DG	DG3	Thornhill	Dumfriesshire
DG	DG4	Sanquhar	Dumfriesshire
DG	DG5	Dalbeattie	Kirkcudbrightshire
DG	DG6	Kirkcudbright	Kirkcudbrightshire
DG	DG7	Castle Douglas	Kirkcudbrightshire
DG	DG8	Newton Stewart	Wigtownshire
DG	DG9	Stranraer	Wigtownshire
DG	DG10	Moffat	Dumfriesshire
DG	DG11	Lockerbie	Dumfriesshire
DG	DG12	Annan	Dumfriesshire
DG	DG13	Langholm	Dumfriesshire
DG	DG14	Canonbie	Dumfriesshire
DG	DG16	Gretna	Dumfriesshire
DH	DH1, DH6, DH7, DH8,^{shared} DH97,^{non-geo} DH98,^{non-geo} DH99^{non-geo}	Durham	County Durham
DH	DH2, DH3	Chester le Street	County Durham
DH	DH4, DH5	Houghton le Spring	Tyne and Wear
DH	DH8^{shared}	Consett	County Durham
DH	DH8,^{shared} DH9	Stanley	County Durham
DL	DL1, DL2, DL3, DL98^{non-geo}	Darlington	County Durham
DL	DL4	Shildon	County Durham
DL	DL5	Newton Aycliffe	County Durham
DL	DL6, DL7	Northallerton	North Yorkshire
DL	DL8^{shared}	Bedale	North Yorkshire
DL	DL8^{shared}	Hawes	North Yorkshire
DL	DL8^{shared}	Leyburn	North Yorkshire
DL	DL9	Catterick Garrison	North Yorkshire
DL	DL10, DL11	Richmond	North Yorkshire
DL	DL12	Barnard Castle	County Durham
DL	DL13, DL14	Bishop Auckland	County Durham
DL	DL15	Crook	County Durham
DL	DL16^{shared}	Spennymoor	County Durham
DL	DL16,^{non-geo} ^{shared} DL17	Ferryhill	County Durham
DN	DN1, DN2, DN3, DN4, DN5, DN6, DN7, DN8, DN9, DN10, DN11, DN12, DN55^{non-geo}	Doncaster	South Yorkshire
DN	DN14	Goole	North Humberside
DN	DN15, DN16, DN17	Scunthorpe	South Humberside
DN	DN18	Barton-upon-Humber	South Humberside
DN	DN19	Barrow-upon-Humber	South Humberside
DN	DN20	Brigg	South Humberside
DN	DN21	Gainsborough	Lincolnshire
DN	DN22	Retford	Nottinghamshire
DN	DN31, DN32, DN33, DN34, DN36, DN37, DN41	Grimsby	South Humberside
DN	DN35	Cleethorpes	South Humberside
DN	DN38	Barnetby	South Humberside
DN	DN39	Ulceby	South Humberside
DN	DN40	Immingham	South Humberside
DT	DT1, DT2	Dorchester	Dorset
DT	DT3, DT4	Weymouth	Dorset
DT	DT5	Portland	Dorset
DT	DT6	Bridport	Dorset
DT	DT7	Lyme Regis	Dorset
DT	DT8	Beaminster	Dorset
DT	DT9	Sherborne	Dorset
DT	DT10	Sturminster Newton	Dorset
DT	DT11	Blandford Forum	Dorset
DY	DY1, DY2, DY3	Dudley	West Midlands
DY	DY4	Tipton	West Midlands
DY	DY5	Brierley Hill	West Midlands
DY	DY6	Kingswinford	West Midlands
DY	DY7, DY8, DY9	Stourbridge	West Midlands
DY	DY10, DY11, DY14	Kidderminster	Worcestershire
DY	DY12	Bewdley	Worcestershire
DY	DY13	Stourport-on-Severn	Worcestershire
E	E1, E1W, E2, E3, E4, E5, E6, E7, E8, E9, E10, E11, E12, E13, E14, E15, E16, E17, E18, E20, E77,^{non-geo} E98^{non-geo}	London	London
EC	EC1A, EC1M, EC1N, EC1P,^{non-geo} EC1R, EC1V, EC1Y, EC2A, EC2M, EC2N, EC2P,^{non-geo} EC2R, EC2V, EC2Y, EC3A, EC3M, EC3N, EC3P,^{non-geo} EC3R, EC3V, EC4A, EC4M, EC4N, EC4P,^{non-geo} EC4R, EC4V, EC4Y, EC50^{non-geo}	London	London
EH	EH1, EH2, EH3, EH4, EH5, EH6, EH7, EH8, EH9, EH10, EH11, EH12, EH13, EH14,^{shared} EH15, EH16, EH17, EH91,^{non-geo} EH95,^{non-geo} EH99^{non-geo}	Edinburgh	Midlothian
EH	EH14^{shared}	Balerno	Midlothian
EH	EH14^{shared}	Currie	Midlothian
EH	EH14^{shared}	Juniper Green	Midlothian
EH	EH18	Lasswade	Midlothian
EH	EH19	Bonnyrigg	Midlothian
EH	EH20	Loanhead	Midlothian
EH	EH21	Musselburgh	Midlothian
EH	EH22	Dalkeith	Midlothian
EH	EH23	Gorebridge	Midlothian
EH	EH24	Rosewell	Midlothian
EH	EH25	Roslin	Midlothian
EH	EH26	Penicuik	Midlothian
EH	EH27	Kirknewton	Midlothian
EH	EH28	Newbridge	Midlothian
EH	EH29	Kirkliston	West Lothian
EH	EH30	South Queensferry	West Lothian
EH	EH31	Gullane	East Lothian
EH	EH32^{shared}	Longniddry	East Lothian
EH	EH32^{shared}	Prestonpans	East Lothian
EH	EH33, EH34, EH35	Tranent	East Lothian
EH	EH36	Humbie	East Lothian
EH	EH37	Pathhead	Midlothian
EH	EH38	Heriot	Midlothian
EH	EH39	North Berwick	East Lothian
EH	EH40	East Linton	East Lothian
EH	EH41	Haddington	East Lothian
EH	EH42	Dunbar	East Lothian
EH	EH43	Walkerburn	Peeblesshire
EH	EH44	Innerleithen	Peeblesshire
EH	EH45	Peebles	Peeblesshire
EH	EH46	West Linton	Peeblesshire
EH	EH47, EH48	Bathgate	West Lothian
EH	EH49	Linlithgow	West Lothian
EH	EH51	Bo'ness	West Lothian
EH	EH52	Broxburn	West Lothian
EH	EH53, EH54	Livingston	West Lothian
EH	EH55	West Calder	West Lothian
EN	EN1, EN2, EN3	Enfield	Middlesex
EN	EN4, EN5	Barnet	Hertfordshire
EN	EN6	Potters Bar	Hertfordshire
EN	EN7, EN8, EN77^{non-geo}	Waltham Cross	Hertfordshire
EN	EN9	Waltham Abbey	Essex
EN	EN10, EN11^{non-geo} ^{shared}	Broxbourne	Hertfordshire
EN	EN11^{shared}	Hoddesdon	Hertfordshire
EX	EX1, EX2, EX3, EX4, EX5, EX6	Exeter	Devon
EX	EX7	Dawlish	Devon
EX	EX8	Exmouth	Devon
EX	EX9	Budleigh Salterton	Devon
EX	EX10	Sidmouth	Devon
EX	EX11	Ottery St Mary	Devon
EX	EX12	Seaton	Devon
EX	EX13	Axminster	Devon
EX	EX14	Honiton	Devon
EX	EX15	Cullompton	Devon
EX	EX16	Tiverton	Devon
EX	EX17	Crediton	Devon
EX	EX18	Chulmleigh	Devon
EX	EX19	Winkleigh	Devon
EX	EX20^{shared}	North Tawton	Devon
EX	EX20^{shared}	Okehampton	Devon
EX	EX21	Beaworthy	Devon
EX	EX22	Holsworthy	Devon
EX	EX23	Bude	Cornwall
EX	EX24	Colyton	Devon
EX	EX31, EX32	Barnstaple	Devon
EX	EX33	Braunton	Devon
EX	EX34^{shared}	Ilfracombe	Devon
EX	EX34^{shared}	Woolacombe	Devon
EX	EX35^{shared}	Lynmouth	Devon
EX	EX35^{shared}	Lynton	Devon
EX	EX36	South Molton	Devon
EX	EX37	Umberleigh	Devon
EX	EX38	Torrington	Devon
EX	EX39	Bideford	Devon
FK	FK1, FK2	Falkirk	Stirlingshire
FK	FK3	Grangemouth	Stirlingshire
FK	FK4	Bonnybridge	Stirlingshire
FK	FK5	Larbert	Stirlingshire
FK	FK6	Denny	Stirlingshire
FK	FK7, FK8, FK9	Stirling	Stirlingshire
FK	FK10^{shared}	Alloa	Clackmannanshire
FK	FK10^{shared}	Clackmannan	Clackmannanshire
FK	FK11	Menstrie	Clackmannanshire
FK	FK12	Alva	Clackmannanshire
FK	FK13	Tillicoultry	Clackmannanshire
FK	FK14	Dollar	Clackmannanshire
FK	FK15	Dunblane	Perthshire
FK	FK16	Doune	Perthshire
FK	FK17, FK18	Callander	Perthshire
FK	FK19	Lochearnhead	Perthshire
FK	FK20	Crianlarich	Perthshire
FK	FK21	Killin	Perthshire
FY	FY0,^{non-geo} FY1, FY2, FY3, FY4	Blackpool	Lancashire
FY	FY5	Thornton-Cleveleys	Lancashire
FY	FY6	Poulton-le-Fylde	Lancashire
FY	FY7	Fleetwood	Lancashire
FY	FY8	Lytham St Annes	Lancashire
G	G1, G2, G3, G4, G5, G9,^{non-geo} G11, G12, G13, G14, G15, G20, G21, G22, G23, G31, G32, G33, G34, G40, G41, G42, G43, G44, G45, G46, G51, G52, G53, G58,^{non-geo} G60, G61, G62, G63, G64, G65, G66, G67, G68, G69, G70,^{non-geo} G71, G72, G73, G74, G75, G76, G77, G78, G79,^{non-geo} G90^{non-geo}	Glasgow	Lanarkshire
G	G81	Clydebank	Dunbartonshire
G	G82	Dumbarton	Dunbartonshire
G	G83^{shared}	Alexandria	Dunbartonshire
G	G83^{shared}	Arrochar	Dunbartonshire
G	G84	Helensburgh	Dunbartonshire
GL	GL1, GL2, GL3, GL4, GL19	Gloucester	Gloucestershire
GL	GL5, GL6	Stroud	Gloucestershire
GL	GL7^{shared}	Cirencester	Gloucestershire
GL	GL7^{shared}	Fairford	Gloucestershire
GL	GL7^{shared}	Lechlade	Gloucestershire
GL	GL8	Tetbury	Gloucestershire
GL	GL9	Badminton	Avon
GL	GL10	Stonehouse	Gloucestershire
GL	GL11^{shared}	Dursley	Gloucestershire
GL	GL11,^{non-geo} ^{shared} GL12	Wotton-under-Edge	Gloucestershire
GL	GL13	Berkeley	Gloucestershire
GL	GL14^{shared}	Cinderford	Gloucestershire
GL	GL14^{shared}	Newnham	Gloucestershire
GL	GL14^{shared}	Westbury-on-Severn	Gloucestershire
GL	GL15^{shared}	Blakeney	Gloucestershire
GL	GL15^{shared}	Lydney	Gloucestershire
GL	GL16	Coleford	Gloucestershire
GL	GL17^{shared}	Drybrook	Gloucestershire
GL	GL17^{shared}	Longhope	Gloucestershire
GL	GL17^{shared}	Lydbrook	Gloucestershire
GL	GL17^{shared}	Mitcheldean	Gloucestershire
GL	GL17^{shared}	Ruardean	Gloucestershire
GL	GL18^{shared}	Dymock	Gloucestershire
GL	GL18^{shared}	Newent	Gloucestershire
GL	GL20	Tewkesbury	Gloucestershire
GL	GL50, GL51, GL52, GL53, GL54	Cheltenham	Gloucestershire
GL	GL55	Chipping Campden	Gloucestershire
GL	GL56	Moreton-in-Marsh	Gloucestershire
GU	GU1, GU2, GU3, GU4, GU5	Guildford	Surrey
GU	GU6	Cranleigh	Surrey
GU	GU7, GU8	Godalming	Surrey
GU	GU9, GU10	Farnham	Surrey
GU	GU11, GU12	Aldershot	Hampshire
GU	GU14, GU17	Farnborough	Hampshire
GU	GU15, GU16, GU17, GU95^{non-geo}	Camberley	Surrey
GU	GU18	Lightwater	Surrey
GU	GU19	Bagshot	Surrey
GU	GU20	Windlesham	Surrey
GU	GU21, GU22, GU23, GU24	Woking	Surrey
GU	GU25	Virginia Water	Surrey
GU	GU26, GU27^{non-geo} ^{shared}	Hindhead	Surrey
GU	GU27^{shared}	Haslemere	Surrey
GU	GU28	Petworth	West Sussex
GU	GU29	Midhurst	West Sussex
GU	GU30	Liphook	Hampshire
GU	GU31, GU32	Petersfield	Hampshire
GU	GU33	Liss	Hampshire
GU	GU34	Alton	Hampshire
GU	GU35	Bordon	Hampshire
GU	GU46	Yateley	Hampshire
GU	GU47	Sandhurst	Berkshire
GU	GU51, GU52	Fleet	Hampshire
GY	GY1, GY2, GY3, GY4, GY5, GY6, GY7, GY8, GY9, GY10	Guernsey	Channel Isles^{not}
HA	HA0, HA9	Wembley	Middlesex
HA	HA1, HA2, HA3	Harrow	Middlesex
HA	HA4	Ruislip	Middlesex
HA	HA5	Pinner	Middlesex
HA	HA6	Northwood	Middlesex
HA	HA7	Stanmore	Middlesex
HA	HA8	Edgware	Middlesex
HD	HD1, HD2, HD3, HD4, HD5, HD7, HD8	Huddersfield	West Yorkshire
HD	HD6	Brighouse	West Yorkshire
HD	HD9	Holmfirth	West Yorkshire
HG	HG1, HG2, HG3	Harrogate	North Yorkshire
HG	HG4	Ripon	North Yorkshire
HG	HG5	Knaresborough	North Yorkshire
HP	HP1, HP2, HP3	Hemel Hempstead	Hertfordshire
HP	HP4	Berkhamsted	Hertfordshire
HP	HP5	Chesham	Buckinghamshire
HP	HP6, HP7	Amersham	Buckinghamshire
HP	HP8	Chalfont St Giles	Buckinghamshire
HP	HP9	Beaconsfield	Buckinghamshire
HP	HP10, HP11, HP12, HP13, HP14, HP15	High Wycombe	Buckinghamshire
HP	HP16	Great Missenden	Buckinghamshire
HP	HP17, HP18, HP19, HP20, HP21, HP22^{shared}	Aylesbury	Buckinghamshire
HP	HP22,^{non-geo} ^{shared} HP27	Princes Risborough	Buckinghamshire
HP	HP23	Tring	Hertfordshire
HR	HR1, HR2, HR3, HR4	Hereford	Herefordshire
HR	HR5	Kington	Herefordshire
HR	HR6	Leominster	Herefordshire
HR	HR7	Bromyard	Herefordshire
HR	HR8	Ledbury	Herefordshire
HR	HR9	Ross-on-Wye	Herefordshire
HS	HS1	Stornoway	Isle of Lewis
HS	HS2	Isle of Lewis	Isle of Lewis
HS	HS3, HS5	Isle of Harris	Isle of Harris
HS	HS4	Isle of Scalpay	Isle of Scalpay
HS	HS6	Isle of North Uist	Isle of North Uist
HS	HS7	Isle of Benbecula	Isle of Benbecula
HS	HS8	Isle of South Uist	Inverness-shire
HS	HS9	Isle of Barra	Isle of Barra
HU	HU1, HU2, HU3, HU4, HU5, HU6, HU7, HU8, HU9, HU10, HU11, HU12	Hull	North Humberside
HU	HU13	Hessle	North Humberside
HU	HU14	North Ferriby	North Humberside
HU	HU15	Brough	North Humberside
HU	HU16, HU20	Cottingham	North Humberside
HU	HU17	Beverley	North Humberside
HU	HU18	Hornsea	North Humberside
HU	HU19	Withernsea	North Humberside
HX	HX1,^{shared} HX2, HX3, HX4	Halifax	West Yorkshire
HX	HX1,^{non-geo} ^{shared} HX5	Elland	West Yorkshire
HX	HX6	Sowerby Bridge	West Yorkshire
HX	HX7	Hebden Bridge	West Yorkshire
IG	IG1, IG2, IG3, IG4, IG5, IG6	Ilford	Essex
IG	IG7, IG8^{shared}	Chigwell	Essex
IG	IG8^{shared}	Woodford Green	Essex
IG	IG9	Buckhurst Hill	Essex
IG	IG10	Loughton	Essex
IG	IG11	Barking	Essex
IM	IM1, IM2, IM3, IM4, IM5, IM6, IM7, IM8, IM9, IM99^{non-geo}	Isle of Man	Isle of Man^{not}
IP	IP1, IP2, IP3, IP4, IP5, IP6, IP7, IP8, IP9, IP10	Ipswich	Suffolk
IP	IP11	Felixstowe	Suffolk
IP	IP12, IP13	Woodbridge	Suffolk
IP	IP14	Stowmarket	Suffolk
IP	IP15	Aldeburgh	Suffolk
IP	IP16	Leiston	Suffolk
IP	IP17	Saxmundham	Suffolk
IP	IP18	Southwold	Suffolk
IP	IP19	Halesworth	Suffolk
IP	IP20	Harleston	Norfolk
IP	IP21,^{shared} IP22, IP98^{non-geo}	Diss	Norfolk
IP	IP21,^{shared} IP23	Eye	Suffolk
IP	IP24, IP25, IP26	Thetford	Norfolk
IP	IP27	Brandon	Suffolk
IP	IP28, IP29, IP30, IP31, IP32, IP33	Bury St Edmunds	Suffolk
IV	IV1, IV2, IV3, IV5, IV13, IV63, IV99^{non-geo}	Inverness	Inverness-shire
IV	IV4	Beauly	Inverness-shire
IV	IV6	Muir of Ord	Ross-shire
IV	IV7, IV15, IV16	Dingwall	Ross-shire
IV	IV8	Munlochy	Ross-shire
IV	IV9	Avoch	Ross-shire
IV	IV10	Fortrose	Ross-shire
IV	IV11	Cromarty	Ross-shire
IV	IV12	Nairn	Nairnshire
IV	IV14	Strathpeffer	Ross-shire
IV	IV17	Alness	Ross-shire
IV	IV18	Invergordon	Ross-shire
IV	IV19, IV20	Tain	Ross-shire
IV	IV21	Gairloch	Ross-shire
IV	IV22	Achnasheen	Ross-shire
IV	IV23	Garve	Ross-shire
IV	IV24	Ardgay	Sutherland
IV	IV25	Dornoch	Sutherland
IV	IV26	Ullapool	Ross-shire
IV	IV27	Lairg	Sutherland
IV	IV28	Rogart	Sutherland
IV	IV30	Elgin	Morayshire
IV	IV31	Lossiemouth	Morayshire
IV	IV32	Fochabers	Morayshire
IV	IV36	Forres	Morayshire
IV	IV40	Kyle	Ross-shire
IV	IV41, IV42, IV43, IV44, IV45, IV46, IV47, IV48, IV49, IV55, IV56	Isle of Skye	Isle of Skye
IV	IV51	Portree	Isle of Skye
IV	IV52	Plockton	Ross-shire
IV	IV53	Strome Ferry	Ross-shire
IV	IV54	Strathcarron	Ross-shire
JE	JE1,^{non-geo} JE2, JE3, JE4,^{non-geo} JE5	Jersey	Channel Isles^{not}
KA	KA1, KA2, KA3	Kilmarnock	Ayrshire
KA	KA4	Galston	Ayrshire
KA	KA5	Mauchline	Ayrshire
KA	KA6, KA7, KA8	Ayr	Ayrshire
KA	KA9	Prestwick	Ayrshire
KA	KA10	Troon	Ayrshire
KA	KA11, KA12	Irvine	Ayrshire
KA	KA13	Kilwinning	Ayrshire
KA	KA14, KA15	Beith	Ayrshire
KA	KA16	Newmilns	Ayrshire
KA	KA17	Darvel	Ayrshire
KA	KA18	Cumnock	Ayrshire
KA	KA19	Maybole	Ayrshire
KA	KA20	Stevenston	Ayrshire
KA	KA21	Saltcoats	Ayrshire
KA	KA22	Ardrossan	Ayrshire
KA	KA23	West Kilbride	Ayrshire
KA	KA24	Dalry	Ayrshire
KA	KA25	Kilbirnie	Ayrshire
KA	KA26	Girvan	Ayrshire
KA	KA27	Isle of Arran	Isle of Arran
KA	KA28	Isle of Cumbrae	Isle of Cumbrae
KA	KA29, KA30	Largs	Ayrshire
KT	KT1, KT2	Kingston upon Thames	Surrey
KT	KT3	New Malden	Surrey
KT	KT4	Worcester Park	Surrey
KT	KT5, KT6	Surbiton	Surrey
KT	KT7	Thames Ditton	Surrey
KT	KT8^{shared}	East Molesey	Surrey
KT	KT8^{shared}	West Molesey	Surrey
KT	KT9	Chessington	Surrey
KT	KT10	Esher	Surrey
KT	KT11	Cobham	Surrey
KT	KT12	Walton-on-Thames	Surrey
KT	KT13	Weybridge	Surrey
KT	KT14	West Byfleet	Surrey
KT	KT15	Addlestone	Surrey
KT	KT16	Chertsey	Surrey
KT	KT17, KT18, KT19	Epsom	Surrey
KT	KT20	Tadworth	Surrey
KT	KT21	Ashtead	Surrey
KT	KT22, KT23, KT24	Leatherhead	Surrey
KW	KW1	Wick	Caithness
KW	KW2, KW3	Lybster	Caithness
KW	KW5	Latheron	Caithness
KW	KW6	Dunbeath	Caithness
KW	KW7	Berriedale	Caithness
KW	KW8	Helmsdale	Sutherland
KW	KW9	Brora	Sutherland
KW	KW10	Golspie	Sutherland
KW	KW11	Kinbrace	Sutherland
KW	KW12	Halkirk	Caithness
KW	KW13	Forsinard	Sutherland
KW	KW14	Thurso	Caithness
KW	KW15	Kirkwall	Orkney
KW	KW16	Stromness	Orkney
KW	KW17	Orkney	Orkney
KY	KY1, KY2	Kirkcaldy	Fife
KY	KY3	Burntisland	Fife
KY	KY4^{shared}	Cowdenbeath	Fife
KY	KY4^{shared}	Kelty	Fife
KY	KY5	Lochgelly	Fife
KY	KY6, KY7	Glenrothes	Fife
KY	KY8, KY9	Leven	Fife
KY	KY10	Anstruther	Fife
KY	KY11,^{shared} KY12, KY99^{non-geo}	Dunfermline	Fife
KY	KY11^{shared}	Inverkeithing	Fife
KY	KY13	Kinross	Kinross-shire
KY	KY14, KY15	Cupar	Fife
KY	KY16	St Andrews	Fife
L	L1, L2, L3, L4, L5, L6, L7, L8, L9, L10, L11, L12, L13, L14, L15, L16, L17, L18, L19, L20,^{shared} L21, L22, L23, L24, L25, L26, L27, L28, L29, L31, L32, L33, L36, L37, L38, L67,^{non-geo} L68,^{non-geo} L69,^{non-geo} ^{shared} L70,^{non-geo} L71,^{non-geo} L72,^{non-geo} L73,^{non-geo} L74,^{non-geo} L75^{non-geo}	Liverpool	Merseyside
L	L20,^{shared} L30, L69,^{non-geo} ^{shared} L80,^{non-geo} GIR^{non-geo}	Bootle	Merseyside
L	L34, L35	Prescot	Merseyside
L	L39, L40	Ormskirk	Lancashire
LA	LA1, LA2	Lancaster	Lancashire
LA	LA3, LA4	Morecambe	Lancashire
LA	LA5, LA6	Carnforth	Lancashire
LA	LA7	Milnthorpe	Cumbria
LA	LA8, LA9	Kendal	Cumbria
LA	LA10	Sedbergh	Cumbria
LA	LA11	Grange-over-Sands	Cumbria
LA	LA12	Ulverston	Cumbria
LA	LA13, LA14^{shared}	Barrow-in-Furness	Cumbria
LA	LA14,^{non-geo} ^{shared} LA15	Dalton-in-Furness	Cumbria
LA	LA16	Askam-in-Furness	Cumbria
LA	LA17	Kirkby-in-Furness	Cumbria
LA	LA18, LA19	Millom	Cumbria
LA	LA20	Broughton-in-Furness	Cumbria
LA	LA21	Coniston	Cumbria
LA	LA22	Ambleside	Cumbria
LA	LA23	Windermere	Cumbria
LD	LD1	Llandrindod Wells	Powys
LD	LD2	Builth Wells	Powys
LD	LD3	Brecon	Powys
LD	LD4	Llangammarch Wells	Powys
LD	LD5	Llanwrtyd Wells	Powys
LD	LD6	Rhayader	Powys
LD	LD7	Knighton	Powys
LD	LD8	Presteigne	Powys
LE	LE1, LE2, LE3, LE4, LE5, LE6, LE7, LE8, LE9, LE19, LE21,^{non-geo} LE41,^{non-geo} LE55,^{non-geo} LE87,^{non-geo} LE94,^{non-geo} LE95^{non-geo}	Leicester	Leicestershire
LE	LE10	Hinckley	Leicestershire
LE	LE11, LE12	Loughborough	Leicestershire
LE	LE13, LE14	Melton Mowbray	Leicestershire
LE	LE15	Oakham	Leicestershire / Rutland
LE	LE16	Market Harborough	Leicestershire
LE	LE17	Lutterworth	Leicestershire
LE	LE18	Wigston	Leicestershire
LE	LE65	Ashby-de-la-Zouch	Leicestershire
LE	LE67^{shared}	Coalville	Leicestershire
LE	LE67^{shared}	Ibstock	Leicestershire
LE	LE67^{shared}	Markfield	Leicestershire
LL	LL11, LL12, LL13, LL14	Wrexham	Clwyd
LL	LL15	Ruthin	Clwyd
LL	LL16	Denbigh	Clwyd
LL	LL17, LL18^{non-geo} ^{shared}	St Asaph	Clwyd
LL	LL18^{shared}	Rhyl	Clwyd
LL	LL19	Prestatyn	Clwyd
LL	LL20	Llangollen	Clwyd
LL	LL21	Corwen	Clwyd
LL	LL22	Abergele	Clwyd
LL	LL23	Bala	Gwynedd
LL	LL24	Betws-y-Coed	Gwynedd
LL	LL25	Dolwyddelan	Gwynedd
LL	LL26	Llanrwst	Gwynedd
LL	LL27	Trefriw	Gwynedd
LL	LL28, LL29	Colwyn Bay	Clwyd
LL	LL30	Llandudno	Gwynedd
LL	LL31,^{shared} LL32	Conwy	Gwynedd
LL	LL31^{shared}	Llandudno Junction	Gwynedd
LL	LL33	Llanfairfechan	Gwynedd
LL	LL34	Penmaenmawr	Gwynedd
LL	LL35	Aberdyfi	Gwynedd
LL	LL36	Tywyn	Gwynedd
LL	LL37	Llwyngwril	Gwynedd
LL	LL38	Fairbourne	Gwynedd
LL	LL39	Arthog	Gwynedd
LL	LL40	Dolgellau	Gwynedd
LL	LL41	Blaenau Ffestiniog	Gwynedd
LL	LL42	Barmouth	Gwynedd
LL	LL43	Talybont	Gwynedd
LL	LL44	Dyffryn Ardudwy	Gwynedd
LL	LL45	Llanbedr	Gwynedd
LL	LL46	Harlech	Gwynedd
LL	LL47	Talsarnau	Gwynedd
LL	LL48	Penrhyndeudraeth	Gwynedd
LL	LL49	Porthmadog	Gwynedd
LL	LL51	Garndolbenmaen	Gwynedd
LL	LL52	Criccieth	Gwynedd
LL	LL53	Pwllheli	Gwynedd
LL	LL54, LL55	Caernarfon	Gwynedd
LL	LL56	Y Felinheli	Gwynedd
LL	LL57	Bangor	Gwynedd
LL	LL58	Beaumaris	Gwynedd
LL	LL59	Menai Bridge	Gwynedd
LL	LL60	Gaerwen	Gwynedd
LL	LL61	Llanfairpwllgwyngyll	Gwynedd
LL	LL62	Bodorgan	Gwynedd
LL	LL63	Ty Croes	Gwynedd
LL	LL64, LL77^{non-geo} ^{shared}	Rhosneigr	Gwynedd
LL	LL65	Holyhead	Gwynedd
LL	LL66	Rhosgoch	Gwynedd
LL	LL67	Cemaes Bay	Gwynedd
LL	LL68	Amlwch	Gwynedd
LL	LL69	Penysarn	Gwynedd
LL	LL70	Dulas	Gwynedd
LL	LL71	Llanerchymedd	Gwynedd
LL	LL72	Moelfre	Gwynedd
LL	LL73	Marianglas	Gwynedd
LL	LL74	Tyn-y-Gongl	Gwynedd
LL	LL75	Pentraeth	Gwynedd
LL	LL76	Llanbedrgoch	Gwynedd
LL	LL77^{shared}	Llangefni	Gwynedd
LL	LL78	Brynteg	Gwynedd
LN	LN1, LN2, LN3, LN4, LN5, LN6	Lincoln	Lincolnshire
LN	LN7, LN8	Market Rasen	Lincolnshire
LN	LN9	Horncastle	Lincolnshire
LN	LN10	Woodhall Spa	Lincolnshire
LN	LN11	Louth	Lincolnshire
LN	LN12	Mablethorpe	Lincolnshire
LN	LN13	Alford	Lincolnshire
LS	LS1, LS2, LS3, LS4, LS5, LS6, LS7, LS8, LS9, LS10, LS11, LS12, LS13, LS14, LS15, LS16, LS17, LS18, LS19, LS20, LS25, LS26, LS27, LS88,^{non-geo} LS98,^{non-geo} LS99^{non-geo}	Leeds	West Yorkshire
LS	LS21	Otley	West Yorkshire
LS	LS22, LS23	Wetherby	West Yorkshire
LS	LS24	Tadcaster	North Yorkshire
LS	LS28	Pudsey	West Yorkshire
LS	LS29	Ilkley	West Yorkshire
LU	LU1, LU2, LU3, LU4	Luton	Bedfordshire
LU	LU5, LU6	Dunstable	Bedfordshire
LU	LU7	Leighton Buzzard	Bedfordshire
M	M1, M2, M3,^{shared} M4, M8, M9, M11, M12, M13, M14, M15, M16, M17, M18, M19, M20, M21, M22, M23, M24, M25, M26, M27, M28, M29, M30, M31, M32, M34, M35, M38, M40, M41, M43, M44, M45, M46, M60,^{non-geo} ^{shared} M61,^{non-geo} M90, M99^{non-geo}	Manchester	Lancashire
M	M3,^{shared} M5, M6, M7, M50, M60^{non-geo} ^{shared}	Salford	Lancashire
M	M33	Sale	Cheshire
ME	ME1, ME2, ME3	Rochester	Kent
ME	ME4, ME5	Chatham	Kent
ME	ME6,^{shared} ME20	Aylesford	Kent
ME	ME6^{shared}	Snodland	Kent
ME	ME6,^{shared} ME19	West Malling	Kent
ME	ME7, ME8	Gillingham	Kent
ME	ME9, ME10	Sittingbourne	Kent
ME	ME11	Queenborough	Kent
ME	ME12	Sheerness	Kent
ME	ME13	Faversham	Kent
ME	ME14, ME15, ME16, ME17, ME18, ME99^{non-geo}	Maidstone	Kent
MK	MK1, MK2, MK3, MK4, MK5, MK6, MK7, MK8, MK9, MK10, MK11, MK12, MK13, MK14, MK15, MK17, MK19, MK77^{non-geo}	Milton Keynes	Buckinghamshire
MK	MK16	Newport Pagnell	Buckinghamshire
MK	MK18	Buckingham	Buckinghamshire
MK	MK40, MK41, MK42, MK43, MK44, MK45	Bedford	Bedfordshire
MK	MK46	Olney	Buckinghamshire
ML	ML1	Motherwell	Lanarkshire
ML	ML2	Wishaw	Lanarkshire
ML	ML3	HAMILTON	Lanarkshire
ML	ML4	Bellshill	Lanarkshire
ML	ML5	Coatbridge	Lanarkshire
ML	ML6	Airdrie	Lanarkshire
ML	ML7	Shotts	Lanarkshire
ML	ML8	Carluke	Lanarkshire
ML	ML9	Larkhall	Lanarkshire
ML	ML10	Strathaven	Lanarkshire
ML	ML11	Lanark	Lanarkshire
ML	ML12	Biggar	Lanarkshire
N	N1, N1C, N1P,^{non-geo} N2, N3, N4, N5, N6, N7, N8, N9, N10, N11, N12, N13, N14, N15, N16, N17, N18, N19, N20, N21, N22, N81^{non-geo}	London	London
NE	NE1, NE2, NE3, NE4, NE5, NE6, NE7, NE12, NE13, NE15, NE16, NE17, NE18, NE19, NE20, NE27, NE82,^{non-geo} NE83,^{non-geo} NE85,^{non-geo} NE88,^{non-geo} NE98,^{non-geo} NE99^{non-geo}	Newcastle upon Tyne	Tyne and Wear
NE	NE8, NE9, NE10, NE11, NE92^{non-geo}	Gateshead	Tyne and Wear
NE	NE21	Blaydon-on-Tyne	Tyne and Wear
NE	NE22	Bedlington	Northumberland
NE	NE23	Cramlington	Northumberland
NE	NE24	Blyth	Northumberland
NE	NE25, NE26	Whitley Bay	Tyne and Wear
NE	NE28	Wallsend	Tyne and Wear
NE	NE29, NE30	North Shields	Tyne and Wear
NE	NE31	Hebburn	Tyne and Wear
NE	NE32	Jarrow	Tyne and Wear
NE	NE33, NE34	South Shields	Tyne and Wear
NE	NE35	Boldon Colliery	Tyne and Wear
NE	NE36	East Boldon	Tyne and Wear
NE	NE37, NE38	Washington	Tyne and Wear
NE	NE39	Rowlands Gill	Tyne and Wear
NE	NE40	Ryton	Tyne and Wear
NE	NE41	Wylam	Northumberland
NE	NE42	Prudhoe	Northumberland
NE	NE43	Stocksfield	Northumberland
NE	NE44	Riding Mill	Northumberland
NE	NE45	Corbridge	Northumberland
NE	NE46, NE47, NE48	Hexham	Northumberland
NE	NE49	Haltwhistle	Northumberland
NE	NE61, NE65	Morpeth	Northumberland
NE	NE62	Choppington	Northumberland
NE	NE63	Ashington	Northumberland
NE	NE64	Newbiggin-by-the-Sea	Northumberland
NE	NE66^{shared}	Alnwick	Northumberland
NE	NE66,^{non-geo} ^{shared} NE69	Bamburgh	Northumberland
NE	NE67	Chathill	Northumberland
NE	NE68	Seahouses	Northumberland
NE	NE70	Belford	Northumberland
NE	NE71	Wooler	Northumberland
NG	NG1, NG2, NG3, NG4, NG5, NG6, NG7, NG8, NG9, NG10, NG11, NG12, NG13, NG14, NG15, NG16, NG17,^{shared} NG80,^{non-geo} NG90^{non-geo}	Nottingham	Nottinghamshire
NG	NG17^{shared}	Sutton-in-Ashfield	Nottinghamshire
NG	NG18, NG19, NG20, NG21, NG70^{non-geo}	Mansfield	Nottinghamshire
NG	NG22, NG23, NG24	Newark	Nottinghamshire
NG	NG25	Southwell	Nottinghamshire
NG	NG31, NG32, NG33	Grantham	Lincolnshire
NG	NG34	Sleaford	Lincolnshire
NN	NN1, NN2, NN3, NN4, NN5, NN6, NN7	Northampton	Northamptonshire
NN	NN8, NN9, NN29	Wellingborough	Northamptonshire
NN	NN10	Rushden	Northamptonshire
NN	NN11	Daventry	Northamptonshire
NN	NN12	Towcester	Northamptonshire
NN	NN13	Brackley	Northamptonshire
NN	NN14, NN15, NN16	Kettering	Northamptonshire
NN	NN17, NN18	Corby	Northamptonshire
NP	NP4	Pontypool	Gwent
NP	NP7^{shared}	Abergavenny	Gwent
NP	NP7,^{shared} NP8	Crickhowell	Powys
NP	NP10, NP11, NP18, NP19, NP20	Newport	Gwent
NP	NP12	Blackwood	Gwent
NP	NP13	Abertillery	Gwent
NP	NP15	Usk	Gwent
NP	NP16	Chepstow	Gwent
NP	NP22	Tredegar	Gwent
NP	NP23	Ebbw Vale	Gwent
NP	NP24	New Tredegar	Gwent
NP	NP25	Monmouth	Gwent
NP	NP26	Caldicot	Gwent
NP	NP44	Cwmbran	Gwent
NR	NR1, NR2, NR3, NR4, NR5, NR6, NR7, NR8, NR9, NR10, NR11, NR12, NR13, NR14, NR15, NR16, NR18,^{non-geo} ^{shared} NR19,^{non-geo} ^{shared} NR26,^{non-geo} ^{shared} NR28,^{non-geo} ^{shared} NR99^{non-geo}	Norwich	Norfolk
NR	NR17	Attleborough	Norfolk
NR	NR18^{shared}	Wymondham	Norfolk
NR	NR19,^{shared} NR20	Dereham	Norfolk
NR	NR21	Fakenham	Norfolk
NR	NR22	Walsingham	Norfolk
NR	NR23	Wells-next-the-Sea	Norfolk
NR	NR24	Melton Constable	Norfolk
NR	NR25	Holt	Norfolk
NR	NR26^{shared}	Sheringham	Norfolk
NR	NR27	Cromer	Norfolk
NR	NR28^{shared}	North Walsham	Norfolk
NR	NR29, NR30, NR31	Great Yarmouth	Norfolk
NR	NR32, NR33	Lowestoft	Suffolk
NR	NR34	Beccles	Suffolk
NR	NR35	Bungay	Suffolk
NW	NW1, NW1W,^{non-geo} NW2, NW3, NW4, NW5, NW6, NW7, NW8, NW9, NW10, NW11, NW26^{non-geo}	London	London
OL	OL1, OL2, OL3, OL4, OL8, OL9, OL95^{non-geo}	Oldham	Lancashire
OL	OL5, OL6, OL7	Ashton-under-Lyne	Lancashire
OL	OL10	Heywood	Lancashire
OL	OL11, OL12, OL16^{shared}	Rochdale	Lancashire
OL	OL13	Bacup	Lancashire
OL	OL14	Todmorden	Lancashire
OL	OL15, OL16^{non-geo} ^{shared}	Littleborough	Lancashire
OX	OX1, OX2, OX3, OX4, OX33, OX44	Oxford	Oxfordshire
OX	OX5	Kidlington	Oxfordshire
OX	OX7	Chipping Norton	Oxfordshire
OX	OX9	Thame	Oxfordshire
OX	OX10	Wallingford	Oxfordshire
OX	OX11	Didcot	Oxfordshire
OX	OX12	Wantage	Oxfordshire
OX	OX13, OX14	Abingdon	Oxfordshire
OX	OX15, OX16, OX17	Banbury	Oxfordshire
OX	OX18^{shared}	Bampton	Oxfordshire
OX	OX18^{shared}	Burford	Oxfordshire
OX	OX18^{shared}	Carterton	Oxfordshire
OX	OX20	Woodstock	Oxfordshire
OX	OX25, OX26, OX27	Bicester	Oxfordshire
OX	OX28, OX29	Witney	Oxfordshire
OX	OX39	Chinnor	Oxfordshire
OX	OX49	Watlington	Oxfordshire
PA	PA1, PA2, PA3	Paisley	Renfrewshire
PA	PA4	Renfrew	Renfrewshire
PA	PA5, PA6, PA9, PA10	Johnstone	Renfrewshire
PA	PA7	Bishopton	Renfrewshire
PA	PA8	Erskine	Renfrewshire
PA	PA11	Bridge of Weir	Renfrewshire
PA	PA12	Lochwinnoch	Renfrewshire
PA	PA13	Kilmacolm	Renfrewshire
PA	PA14	Port Glasgow	Renfrewshire
PA	PA15, PA16	Greenock	Renfrewshire
PA	PA17	Skelmorlie	Ayrshire
PA	PA18	Wemyss Bay	Renfrewshire
PA	PA19	Gourock	Renfrewshire
PA	PA20	Isle of Bute	Isle of Bute
PA	PA21	Tighnabruaich	Argyll
PA	PA22	Colintraive	Argyll
PA	PA23	Dunoon	Argyll
PA	PA24, PA25, PA26, PA27	Cairndow	Argyll
PA	PA28	Campbeltown	Argyll
PA	PA29	Tarbert	Argyll
PA	PA30, PA31	Lochgilphead	Argyll
PA	PA32	Inveraray	Argyll
PA	PA33	Dalmally	Argyll
PA	PA34, PA37, PA80	Oban	Argyll
PA	PA35	Taynuilt	Argyll
PA	PA36	Bridge of Orchy	Argyll
PA	PA38	Appin	Argyll
PA	PA41	Isle of Gigha	Isle of Gigha
PA	PA42, PA43, PA44, PA45, PA46, PA47, PA48, PA49	Isle of Islay	Isle of Islay
PA	PA60	Isle of Jura	Isle of Jura
PA	PA61	Isle of Colonsay	Isle of Colonsay
PA	PA62, PA63, PA64, PA65, PA66, PA67, PA68, PA69, PA70, PA71, PA72, PA73, PA74, PA75	Isle of Mull	Isle of Mull
PA	PA76	Isle of Iona	Isle of Iona
PA	PA77	Isle of Tiree	Isle of Tiree
PA	PA78	Isle of Coll	Isle of Coll
PE	PE1, PE2, PE3, PE4, PE5, PE6, PE7, PE8, PE99^{non-geo}	Peterborough	Cambridgeshire
PE	PE9	Stamford	Lincolnshire
PE	PE10	Bourne	Lincolnshire
PE	PE11, PE12	Spalding	Lincolnshire
PE	PE13, PE14	Wisbech	Cambridgeshire
PE	PE15	March	Cambridgeshire
PE	PE16	Chatteris	Cambridgeshire
PE	PE19	St Neots	Cambridgeshire
PE	PE20, PE21, PE22	Boston	Lincolnshire
PE	PE23	Spilsby	Lincolnshire
PE	PE24, PE25	Skegness	Lincolnshire
PE	PE26, PE28, PE29	Huntingdon	Cambridgeshire
PE	PE27	St Ives	Cambridgeshire
PE	PE30, PE31, PE32, PE33, PE34	King's Lynn	Norfolk
PE	PE35	Sandringham	Norfolk
PE	PE36	Hunstanton	Norfolk
PE	PE37	Swaffham	Norfolk
PE	PE38	Downham Market	Norfolk
PH	PH1, PH2, PH14	Perth	Perthshire
PH	PH3, PH4	Auchterarder	Perthshire
PH	PH5, PH6, PH7	Crieff	Perthshire
PH	PH8	Dunkeld	Perthshire
PH	PH9, PH16, PH17, PH18	Pitlochry	Perthshire
PH	PH10, PH11, PH12, PH13	Blairgowrie	Perthshire
PH	PH15	Aberfeldy	Perthshire
PH	PH19	Dalwhinnie	Inverness-shire
PH	PH20	Newtonmore	Inverness-shire
PH	PH21	Kingussie	Inverness-shire
PH	PH22	Aviemore	Inverness-shire
PH	PH23	Carrbridge	Inverness-shire
PH	PH24	Boat of Garten	Inverness-shire
PH	PH25	Nethy Bridge	Inverness-shire
PH	PH26	Grantown-on-Spey	Morayshire
PH	PH30	Corrour	Inverness-shire
PH	PH31	Roy Bridge	Inverness-shire
PH	PH32	Fort Augustus	Inverness-shire
PH	PH33	Fort William	Inverness-shire
PH	PH34	Spean Bridge	Inverness-shire
PH	PH35	Invergarry	Inverness-shire
PH	PH36	Acharacle	Argyll
PH	PH37	Glenfinnan	Inverness-shire
PH	PH38	Lochailort	Inverness-shire
PH	PH39	Arisaig	Inverness-shire
PH	PH40, PH41	Mallaig	Inverness-shire
PH	PH42	Isle of Eigg	Isle of Eigg
PH	PH43	Isle of Rum	Isle of Rum
PH	PH44	Isle of Canna	Isle of Canna
PH	PH49	Ballachulish	Argyll
PH	PH50	Kinlochleven	Argyll
PL	PL1, PL2, PL3, PL4, PL5, PL6, PL7, PL8, PL9, PL95^{non-geo}	Plymouth	Devon
PL	PL10, PL11	Torpoint	Cornwall
PL	PL12	Saltash	Cornwall
PL	PL13	Looe	Cornwall
PL	PL14	Liskeard	Cornwall
PL	PL15	Launceston	Cornwall
PL	PL16	Lifton	Devon
PL	PL17	Callington	Cornwall
PL	PL18^{shared}	Calstock	Cornwall
PL	PL18^{shared}	Gunnislake	Cornwall
PL	PL19	Tavistock	Devon
PL	PL20	Yelverton	Devon
PL	PL21	Ivybridge	Devon
PL	PL22	Lostwithiel	Cornwall
PL	PL23	Fowey	Cornwall
PL	PL24	Par	Cornwall
PL	PL25, PL26	St Austell	Cornwall
PL	PL27	Wadebridge	Cornwall
PL	PL28	Padstow	Cornwall
PL	PL29	Port Isaac	Cornwall
PL	PL30, PL31	Bodmin	Cornwall
PL	PL32	Camelford	Cornwall
PL	PL33	Delabole	Cornwall
PL	PL34	Tintagel	Cornwall
PL	PL35	Boscastle	Cornwall
PO	PO1, PO2, PO3, PO6	Portsmouth	Hampshire
PO	PO4, PO5	Southsea	Hampshire
PO	PO7, PO8	Waterlooville	Hampshire
PO	PO9^{shared}	Havant	Hampshire
PO	PO9^{shared}	Rowland's Castle	Hampshire
PO	PO10	Emsworth	Hampshire
PO	PO11	Hayling Island	Hampshire
PO	PO12,^{shared} PO13^{shared}	Gosport	Hampshire
PO	PO12,^{non-geo} ^{shared} PO13^{shared}	Lee-on-the-Solent	Hampshire
PO	PO14, PO15, PO16, PO17	Fareham	Hampshire
PO	PO18, PO19, PO20	Chichester	West Sussex
PO	PO21, PO22	Bognor Regis	West Sussex
PO	PO30^{shared}	Newport	Isle of Wight
PO	PO30,^{non-geo} ^{shared} PO41	Yarmouth	Isle of Wight
PO	PO31	Cowes	Isle of Wight
PO	PO32	East Cowes	Isle of Wight
PO	PO33	Ryde	Isle of Wight
PO	PO34	Seaview	Isle of Wight
PO	PO35	Bembridge	Isle of Wight
PO	PO36^{shared}	Sandown	Isle of Wight
PO	PO36,^{non-geo} ^{shared} PO37	Shanklin	Isle of Wight
PO	PO38	Ventnor	Isle of Wight
PO	PO39	Totland Bay	Isle of Wight
PO	PO40	Freshwater	Isle of Wight
PR	PR0,^{non-geo} PR1, PR2, PR3, PR4, PR5, PR11^{non-geo}	Preston	Lancashire
PR	PR6, PR7	Chorley	Lancashire
PR	PR8, PR9	Southport	Merseyside
PR	PR25, PR26	Leyland	Lancashire
RG	RG1, RG2, RG4, RG5, RG6, RG7, RG8, RG10, RG19,^{shared} RG30, RG31	Reading	Berkshire
RG	RG9	Henley-on-Thames	Oxfordshire
RG	RG12, RG42	Bracknell	Berkshire
RG	RG14, RG20	Newbury	Berkshire
RG	RG17	Hungerford	Berkshire
RG	RG18, RG19^{shared}	Thatcham	Berkshire
RG	RG21, RG22, RG23, RG24, RG25, RG28^{shared}	Basingstoke	Hampshire
RG	RG26	Tadley	Hampshire
RG	RG27, RG29	Hook	Hampshire
RG	RG28^{shared}	Whitchurch	Hampshire
RG	RG40, RG41	Wokingham	Berkshire
RG	RG45	Crowthorne	Berkshire
RH	RH1	Redhill	Surrey
RH	RH2	Reigate	Surrey
RH	RH3, RH4^{shared}	Betchworth	Surrey
RH	RH4,^{shared} RH5	Dorking	Surrey
RH	RH6^{shared}	Gatwick	West Sussex
RH	RH6^{shared}	Horley	Surrey
RH	RH7	Lingfield	Surrey
RH	RH8	Oxted	Surrey
RH	RH9	Godstone	Surrey
RH	RH10, RH11, RH77^{non-geo}	Crawley	West Sussex
RH	RH12, RH13	Horsham	West Sussex
RH	RH14	Billingshurst	West Sussex
RH	RH15	Burgess Hill	West Sussex
RH	RH16, RH17	Haywards Heath	West Sussex
RH	RH18	Forest Row	East Sussex
RH	RH19	East Grinstead	West Sussex
RH	RH20	Pulborough	West Sussex
RM	RM1, RM2, RM3, RM4, RM5, RM6, RM7	Romford	Essex
RM	RM8, RM9, RM10	Dagenham	Essex
RM	RM11, RM12	Hornchurch	Essex
RM	RM13	Rainham	Essex
RM	RM14	Upminster	Essex
RM	RM15	South Ockendon	Essex
RM	RM16, RM17, RM20	Grays	Essex
RM	RM18	Tilbury	Essex
RM	RM19	Purfleet	Essex
S	S1, S2, S3, S4, S5, S6, S7, S8, S9, S10, S11, S12, S13, S14, S17, S20, S21, S25, S26, S35, S36, S95,^{non-geo} S96,^{non-geo} S97,^{non-geo} ^{shared} S98,^{non-geo} S99^{non-geo}	Sheffield	South Yorkshire
S	S18	Dronfield	Derbyshire
S	S32, S33	Hope Valley	Derbyshire
S	S40, S41, S42, S43, S44, S45, S49^{non-geo}	Chesterfield	Derbyshire
S	S60, S61, S62, S63, S65, S66, S97^{non-geo} ^{shared}	Rotherham	South Yorkshire
S	S64	Mexborough	South Yorkshire
S	S70, S71, S72, S73, S74, S75	Barnsley	South Yorkshire
S	S80, S81	Worksop	Nottinghamshire
SA	SA1, SA2, SA3, SA4, SA5, SA6, SA7, SA8, SA9, SA80,^{non-geo} SA99^{non-geo}	Swansea	West Glamorgan
SA	SA10, SA11	Neath	West Glamorgan
SA	SA12, SA13	Port Talbot	West Glamorgan
SA	SA14, SA15	Llanelli	Dyfed
SA	SA16	Burry Port	Dyfed
SA	SA17^{shared}	Ferryside	Dyfed
SA	SA17^{shared}	Kidwelly	Dyfed
SA	SA18	Ammanford	Dyfed
SA	SA19^{shared}	Llandeilo	Dyfed
SA	SA19^{shared}	Llangadog	Dyfed
SA	SA19^{shared}	Llanwrda	Dyfed
SA	SA20	Llandovery	Dyfed
SA	SA31, SA32, SA33	Carmarthen	Dyfed
SA	SA34	Whitland	Dyfed
SA	SA35	Llanfyrnach	Dyfed
SA	SA36	Glogue	Dyfed
SA	SA37	Boncath	Dyfed
SA	SA38	Newcastle Emlyn	Dyfed
SA	SA39	Pencader	Dyfed
SA	SA40	Llanybydder	Dyfed
SA	SA41	Crymych	Dyfed
SA	SA42	Newport	Dyfed
SA	SA43	Cardigan	Dyfed
SA	SA44	Llandysul	Dyfed
SA	SA45	New Quay	Dyfed
SA	SA46, SA48^{non-geo} ^{shared}	Aberaeron	Dyfed
SA	SA47	Llanarth	Dyfed
SA	SA48^{shared}	Lampeter	Dyfed
SA	SA61, SA62	Haverfordwest	Dyfed
SA	SA63	Clarbeston Road	Dyfed
SA	SA64	Goodwick	Dyfed
SA	SA65	Fishguard	Dyfed
SA	SA66	Clynderwen	Dyfed
SA	SA67	Narberth	Dyfed
SA	SA68	Kilgetty	Dyfed
SA	SA69	Saundersfoot	Dyfed
SA	SA70	Tenby	Dyfed
SA	SA71, SA72^{non-geo} ^{shared}	Pembroke	Dyfed
SA	SA72^{shared}	Pembroke Dock	Dyfed
SA	SA73	Milford Haven	Dyfed
SE	SE1, SE1P,^{non-geo} SE2, SE3, SE4, SE5, SE6, SE7, SE8, SE9, SE10, SE11, SE12, SE13, SE14, SE15, SE16, SE17, SE18, SE19, SE20, SE21, SE22, SE23, SE24, SE25, SE26, SE27, SE28	London	London
SG	SG1, SG2	Stevenage	Hertfordshire
SG	SG3	Knebworth	Hertfordshire
SG	SG4, SG5, SG6^{non-geo} ^{shared}	Hitchin	Hertfordshire
SG	SG6^{shared}	Letchworth Garden City	Hertfordshire
SG	SG7	Baldock	Hertfordshire
SG	SG8	Royston	Hertfordshire
SG	SG9	Buntingford	Hertfordshire
SG	SG10	Much Hadham	Hertfordshire
SG	SG11, SG12	Ware	Hertfordshire
SG	SG13, SG14	Hertford	Hertfordshire
SG	SG15	Arlesey	Bedfordshire
SG	SG16	Henlow	Bedfordshire
SG	SG17	Shefford	Bedfordshire
SG	SG18	Biggleswade	Bedfordshire
SG	SG19	Sandy	Bedfordshire
SK	SK1, SK2, SK3, SK4, SK5, SK6, SK7, SK12	Stockport	Cheshire
SK	SK8	Cheadle	Cheshire
SK	SK9^{shared}	Alderley Edge	Cheshire
SK	SK9^{shared}	Wilmslow	Cheshire
SK	SK10, SK11	Macclesfield	Cheshire
SK	SK13	Glossop	Derbyshire
SK	SK14	Hyde	Cheshire
SK	SK15	Stalybridge	Cheshire
SK	SK16	Dukinfield	Cheshire
SK	SK17	Buxton	Derbyshire
SK	SK22, SK23	High Peak	Derbyshire
SL	SL0	Iver	Buckinghamshire
SL	SL1, SL2, SL3, SL95^{non-geo}	Slough	Berkshire
SL	SL4	Windsor	Berkshire
SL	SL5	Ascot	Berkshire
SL	SL6, SL60^{non-geo}	Maidenhead	Berkshire
SL	SL7	Marlow	Buckinghamshire
SL	SL8	Bourne End	Buckinghamshire
SL	SL9	Gerrards Cross	Buckinghamshire
SM	SM1, SM2, SM3	Sutton	Surrey
SM	SM4	Morden	Surrey
SM	SM5	Carshalton	Surrey
SM	SM6	Wallington	Surrey
SM	SM7	Banstead	Surrey
SN	SN1, SN2, SN3, SN4, SN5, SN6, SN25, SN26, SN38,^{non-geo} SN99^{non-geo}	Swindon	Wiltshire
SN	SN7	Faringdon	Oxfordshire
SN	SN8	Marlborough	Wiltshire
SN	SN9	Pewsey	Wiltshire
SN	SN10	Devizes	Wiltshire
SN	SN11	Calne	Wiltshire
SN	SN12	Melksham	Wiltshire
SN	SN13, SN15^{non-geo} ^{shared}	Corsham	Wiltshire
SN	SN14, SN15^{shared}	Chippenham	Wiltshire
SN	SN16	Malmesbury	Wiltshire
SO	SO14, SO15, SO16, SO17, SO18, SO19, SO30, SO31, SO32, SO40,^{shared} SO45, SO52, SO97^{non-geo}	Southampton	Hampshire
SO	SO20	Stockbridge	Hampshire
SO	SO21, SO22, SO23, SO25^{non-geo}	Winchester	Hampshire
SO	SO24	Alresford	Hampshire
SO	SO40,^{shared} SO43	Lyndhurst	Hampshire
SO	SO41	Lymington	Hampshire
SO	SO42	Brockenhurst	Hampshire
SO	SO50, SO53	Eastleigh	Hampshire
SO	SO51	Romsey	Hampshire
SP	SP1, SP2, SP3, SP4, SP5	Salisbury	Wiltshire
SP	SP6	Fordingbridge	Hampshire
SP	SP7	Shaftesbury	Dorset
SP	SP8	Gillingham	Dorset
SP	SP9	Tidworth	Wiltshire
SP	SP10, SP11	Andover	Hampshire
SR	SR1, SR2, SR3, SR4, SR5, SR6, SR9^{non-geo}	Sunderland	Tyne and Wear
SR	SR7	Seaham	County Durham
SR	SR8	Peterlee	County Durham
SS	SS0, SS1^{shared}	Westcliff-on-Sea	Essex
SS	SS1,^{shared} SS2, SS3, SS22,^{non-geo} SS99^{non-geo}	Southend-on-Sea	Essex
SS	SS4	Rochford	Essex
SS	SS5	Hockley	Essex
SS	SS6	Rayleigh	Essex
SS	SS7	Benfleet	Essex
SS	SS8	Canvey Island	Essex
SS	SS9	Leigh-on-Sea	Essex
SS	SS11, SS12	Wickford	Essex
SS	SS13, SS14, SS15, SS16	Basildon	Essex
SS	SS17	Stanford-le-Hope	Essex
ST	ST1, ST2, ST3, ST4, ST6, ST7, ST8, ST9, ST10, ST11, ST12	Stoke-on-Trent	Staffordshire
ST	ST5, ST55^{non-geo}	Newcastle	Staffordshire
ST	ST13	Leek	Staffordshire
ST	ST14	Uttoxeter	Staffordshire
ST	ST15	Stone	Staffordshire
ST	ST16, ST17, ST18, ST19, ST20, ST21	Stafford	Staffordshire
SW	SW1A, SW1E, SW1H, SW1P, SW1V, SW1W, SW1X, SW1Y, SW2, SW3, SW4, SW5, SW6, SW7, SW8, SW9, SW10, SW11, SW12, SW13, SW14, SW15, SW16, SW17, SW18, SW19, SW20, SW95^{non-geo}	London	London
SY	SY1, SY2, SY3, SY4, SY5, SY99^{non-geo}	Shrewsbury	Shropshire
SY	SY6	Church Stretton	Shropshire
SY	SY7^{shared}	Bucknell	Shropshire
SY	SY7^{shared}	Craven Arms	Shropshire
SY	SY7^{shared}	Lydbury North	Shropshire
SY	SY8	Ludlow	Shropshire
SY	SY9	Bishops Castle	Shropshire
SY	SY10, SY11	Oswestry	Shropshire
SY	SY12	Ellesmere	Shropshire
SY	SY13	Whitchurch	Shropshire
SY	SY14	Malpas	Cheshire
SY	SY15	Montgomery	Powys
SY	SY16	Newtown	Powys
SY	SY17^{shared}	Caersws	Powys
SY	SY17^{shared}	Llandinam	Powys
SY	SY18	Llanidloes	Powys
SY	SY19	Llanbrynmair	Powys
SY	SY20	Machynlleth	Powys
SY	SY21	Welshpool	Powys
SY	SY22^{shared}	Llanfechain	Powys
SY	SY22^{shared}	Llanfyllin	Powys
SY	SY22^{shared}	Llansantffraid	Powys
SY	SY22^{shared}	Llanymynech	Powys
SY	SY22^{shared}	Meifod	Powys
SY	SY23^{shared}	Aberystwyth	Dyfed
SY	SY23^{shared}	Llanon	Dyfed
SY	SY23^{shared}	Llanrhystud	Dyfed
SY	SY24^{shared}	Borth	Dyfed
SY	SY24^{shared}	Bow Street	Dyfed
SY	SY24^{shared}	Talybont	Dyfed
SY	SY25^{shared}	Tregaron	Dyfed
SY	SY25^{shared}	Ystrad Meurig	Dyfed
TA	TA1, TA2, TA3, TA4	Taunton	Somerset
TA	TA5, TA6, TA7	Bridgwater	Somerset
TA	TA8	Burnham-on-Sea	Somerset
TA	TA9	Highbridge	Somerset
TA	TA10	Langport	Somerset
TA	TA11	Somerton	Somerset
TA	TA12	Martock	Somerset
TA	TA13	South Petherton	Somerset
TA	TA14	Stoke-sub-Hamdon	Somerset
TA	TA15	Montacute	Somerset
TA	TA16	Merriott	Somerset
TA	TA17	Hinton St George	Somerset
TA	TA18	Crewkerne	Somerset
TA	TA19	Ilminster	Somerset
TA	TA20	Chard	Somerset
TA	TA21	Wellington	Somerset
TA	TA22	Dulverton	Somerset
TA	TA23	Watchet	Somerset
TA	TA24	Minehead	Somerset
TD	TD1	Galashiels	Selkirkshire
TD	TD2	Lauder	Berwickshire
TD	TD3	Gordon	Berwickshire
TD	TD4	Earlston	Berwickshire
TD	TD5	Kelso	Roxburghshire
TD	TD6	Melrose	Roxburghshire
TD	TD7	Selkirk	Selkirkshire
TD	TD8	Jedburgh	Roxburghshire
TD	TD9^{shared}	Hawick	Roxburghshire
TD	TD9^{shared}	Newcastleton	Roxburghshire
TD	TD10, TD11	Duns	Berwickshire
TD	TD12^{shared}	Coldstream	Berwickshire
TD	TD12^{shared}	Cornhill-on-Tweed	Northumberland
TD	TD12^{shared}	Mindrum	Northumberland
TD	TD13	Cockburnspath	Berwickshire
TD	TD14	Eyemouth	Berwickshire
TD	TD15	Berwick-upon-Tweed	Northumberland
TF	TF1, TF2, TF3, TF4, TF5, TF6, TF7, TF8	Telford	Shropshire
TF	TF9	Market Drayton	Shropshire
TF	TF10	Newport	Shropshire
TF	TF11	Shifnal	Shropshire
TF	TF12	Broseley	Shropshire
TF	TF13	Much Wenlock	Shropshire
TN	TN1, TN2,^{shared} TN3, TN4	Tunbridge Wells	Kent
TN	TN2,^{non-geo} ^{shared} TN5	Wadhurst	East Sussex
TN	TN6	Crowborough	East Sussex
TN	TN7	Hartfield	East Sussex
TN	TN8	Edenbridge	Kent
TN	TN9, TN10, TN11, TN12	Tonbridge	Kent
TN	TN13, TN14, TN15	Sevenoaks	Kent
TN	TN16	Westerham	Kent
TN	TN17, TN18	Cranbrook	Kent
TN	TN19	Etchingham	East Sussex
TN	TN20	Mayfield	East Sussex
TN	TN21	Heathfield	East Sussex
TN	TN22	Uckfield	East Sussex
TN	TN23, TN24, TN25, TN26, TN27	Ashford	Kent
TN	TN28	New Romney	Kent
TN	TN29	Romney Marsh	Kent
TN	TN30	Tenterden	Kent
TN	TN31	Rye	East Sussex
TN	TN32	Robertsbridge	East Sussex
TN	TN33	Battle	East Sussex
TN	TN34, TN35	Hastings	East Sussex
TN	TN36	Winchelsea	East Sussex
TN	TN37, TN38	St Leonards-on-Sea	East Sussex
TN	TN39, TN40	Bexhill-on-Sea	East Sussex
TQ	TQ1, TQ2	Torquay	Devon
TQ	TQ3, TQ4	Paignton	Devon
TQ	TQ5	Brixham	Devon
TQ	TQ6	Dartmouth	Devon
TQ	TQ7	Kingsbridge	Devon
TQ	TQ8	Salcombe	Devon
TQ	TQ9^{shared}	Totnes	Devon
TQ	TQ9,^{non-geo} ^{shared} TQ10	South Brent	Devon
TQ	TQ11	Buckfastleigh	Devon
TQ	TQ12, TQ13	Newton Abbot	Devon
TQ	TQ14	Teignmouth	Devon
TR	TR1, TR2, TR3, TR4	Truro	Cornwall
TR	TR5	St Agnes	Cornwall
TR	TR6	Perranporth	Cornwall
TR	TR7, TR8	Newquay	Cornwall
TR	TR9	St Columb	Cornwall
TR	TR10	Penryn	Cornwall
TR	TR11	Falmouth	Cornwall
TR	TR12, TR13	Helston	Cornwall
TR	TR14	Camborne	Cornwall
TR	TR15, TR16	Redruth	Cornwall
TR	TR17	Marazion	Cornwall
TR	TR18, TR19, TR20	Penzance	Cornwall
TR	TR21, TR22, TR23, TR24, TR25	Isles of Scilly	Isles of Scilly
TR	TR26	St Ives	Cornwall
TR	TR27	Hayle	Cornwall
TS	TS1, TS2, TS3, TS4, TS5, TS6, TS7, TS8, TS9	Middlesbrough	Cleveland
TS	TS10, TS11	Redcar	Cleveland
TS	TS12, TS13	Saltburn-by-the-Sea	Cleveland
TS	TS14	Guisborough	Cleveland
TS	TS15	Yarm	Cleveland
TS	TS16, TS17, TS18, TS19, TS20, TS21	Stockton-on-Tees	Cleveland
TS	TS22, TS23	Billingham	Cleveland
TS	TS24, TS25, TS26, TS27	Hartlepool	Cleveland
TS	TS28	Wingate	County Durham
TS	TS29	Trimdon Station	County Durham
TW	TW1, TW2	Twickenham	Middlesex
TW	TW3, TW4, TW5, TW6	Hounslow	Middlesex
TW	TW7	Isleworth	Middlesex
TW	TW8	Brentford	Middlesex
TW	TW9, TW10	Richmond	Surrey
TW	TW11	Teddington	Middlesex
TW	TW12	Hampton	Middlesex
TW	TW13, TW14	Feltham	Middlesex
TW	TW15	Ashford	Middlesex
TW	TW16	Sunbury-on-Thames	Middlesex
TW	TW17	Shepperton	Middlesex
TW	TW18, TW19	Staines-upon-Thames	Middlesex
TW	TW20	Egham	Surrey
UB	UB1, UB2, UB3^{non-geo} ^{shared}	Southall	Middlesex
UB	UB3,^{shared} UB4	Hayes	Middlesex
UB	UB5^{shared}	Northolt	Middlesex
UB	UB5,^{non-geo} ^{shared} UB6, UB18^{non-geo}	Greenford	Middlesex
UB	UB7, UB8^{non-geo} ^{shared}	West Drayton	Middlesex
UB	UB8,^{shared} UB9, UB10, UB11	Uxbridge	Middlesex
W	W1A,^{non-geo} W1B, W1C, W1D, W1F, W1G, W1H, W1J, W1K, W1S, W1T, W1U, W1W, W2, W3, W4, W5, W6, W7, W8, W9, W10, W11, W12, W13, W14	London	London
WA	WA1, WA2, WA3, WA4, WA5, WA55^{non-geo}	Warrington	Cheshire
WA	WA6	Frodsham	Cheshire
WA	WA7	Runcorn	Cheshire
WA	WA8, WA88^{non-geo}	Widnes	Cheshire
WA	WA9, WA10, WA11	St Helens	Merseyside
WA	WA12	Newton-le-Willows	Merseyside
WA	WA13	Lymm	Cheshire
WA	WA14, WA15	Altrincham	Cheshire
WA	WA16	Knutsford	Cheshire
WC	WC1A, WC1B, WC1E, WC1H, WC1N, WC1R, WC1V, WC1X, WC2A, WC2B, WC2E, WC2H, WC2N, WC2R	London	London
WD	WD3	Rickmansworth	Hertfordshire
WD	WD4, WD18^{non-geo} ^{shared}	Kings Langley	Hertfordshire
WD	WD5	Abbots Langley	Hertfordshire
WD	WD6	Borehamwood	Hertfordshire
WD	WD7	Radlett	Hertfordshire
WD	WD17, WD18,^{shared} WD19, WD24, WD25, WD99^{non-geo}	Watford	Hertfordshire
WD	WD23	Bushey	Hertfordshire
WF	WF1, WF2, WF3, WF4, WF90^{non-geo}	Wakefield	West Yorkshire
WF	WF5	Ossett	West Yorkshire
WF	WF6, WF10^{shared}	Normanton	West Yorkshire
WF	WF7, WF8, WF9	Pontefract	West Yorkshire
WF	WF10^{shared}	Castleford	West Yorkshire
WF	WF11	Knottingley	West Yorkshire
WF	WF12, WF13	Dewsbury	West Yorkshire
WF	WF14	Mirfield	West Yorkshire
WF	WF15, WF16^{non-geo} ^{shared}	Liversedge	West Yorkshire
WF	WF16^{shared}	Heckmondwike	West Yorkshire
WF	WF17	Batley	West Yorkshire
WN	WN1, WN2, WN3, WN4, WN5, WN6, WN8^{shared}	Wigan	Lancashire
WN	WN7	Leigh	Lancashire
WN	WN8^{shared}	Skelmersdale	Lancashire
WR	WR1, WR2, WR3, WR4, WR5, WR6, WR7, WR8, WR78,^{non-geo} WR99^{non-geo}	Worcester	Worcestershire
WR	WR9	Droitwich	Worcestershire
WR	WR10	Pershore	Worcestershire
WR	WR11^{shared}	Evesham	Worcestershire
WR	WR11,^{non-geo} ^{shared} WR12	Broadway	Worcestershire
WR	WR13, WR14	Malvern	Worcestershire
WR	WR15	Tenbury Wells	Worcestershire
WS	WS1, WS2, WS3, WS4, WS5, WS6, WS8, WS9	Walsall	West Midlands
WS	WS7	Burntwood	Staffordshire
WS	WS10	Wednesbury	West Midlands
WS	WS11, WS12	Cannock	Staffordshire
WS	WS13, WS14	Lichfield	Staffordshire
WS	WS15	Rugeley	Staffordshire
WV	WV1,^{shared} WV2, WV3, WV4, WV5, WV6, WV7, WV8, WV9, WV10, WV11, WV98^{non-geo}	Wolverhampton	West Midlands
WV	WV1,^{non-geo} ^{shared} WV12, WV13	Willenhall	West Midlands
WV	WV14	Bilston	West Midlands
WV	WV15, WV16	Bridgnorth	Shropshire
YO	YO1, YO10, YO19, YO23, YO24, YO26, YO30, YO31, YO32, YO41, YO42, YO43, YO51, YO60, YO61, YO62, YO90,^{non-geo} YO91^{non-geo}	York	North Yorkshire
YO	YO7	Thirsk	North Yorkshire
YO	YO8	Selby	North Yorkshire
YO	YO11, YO12, YO13	Scarborough	North Yorkshire
YO	YO14	Filey	North Yorkshire
YO	YO15, YO16	Bridlington	North Humberside
YO	YO17	Malton	North Yorkshire
YO	YO18	Pickering	North Yorkshire
YO	YO21, YO22	Whitby	North Yorkshire
YO	YO25	Driffield	North Humberside
ZE	ZE1, ZE2, ZE3	Shetland	Shetland Islands

== Notes ==
- ^non-geo Non-geographic postcode district
- ^shared Postcode district shared between post towns
- ^not Not part of the United Kingdom and separate postal authorities

== See also ==
- List of postcode areas in the United Kingdom
