= Humberside (disambiguation) =

Humberside is a former non-metropolitan county in England. It also may refer to:

- Humberside Airport
- Humberside Collegiate Institute
- Humberside County Council
- Humberside Fire and Rescue Service
- Humberside Police
- BBC Radio Humberside
- North Humberside
- South Humberside
