= St Mary's Church, Pitstone =

Coordinates: 51.8251°N 0.6341°W

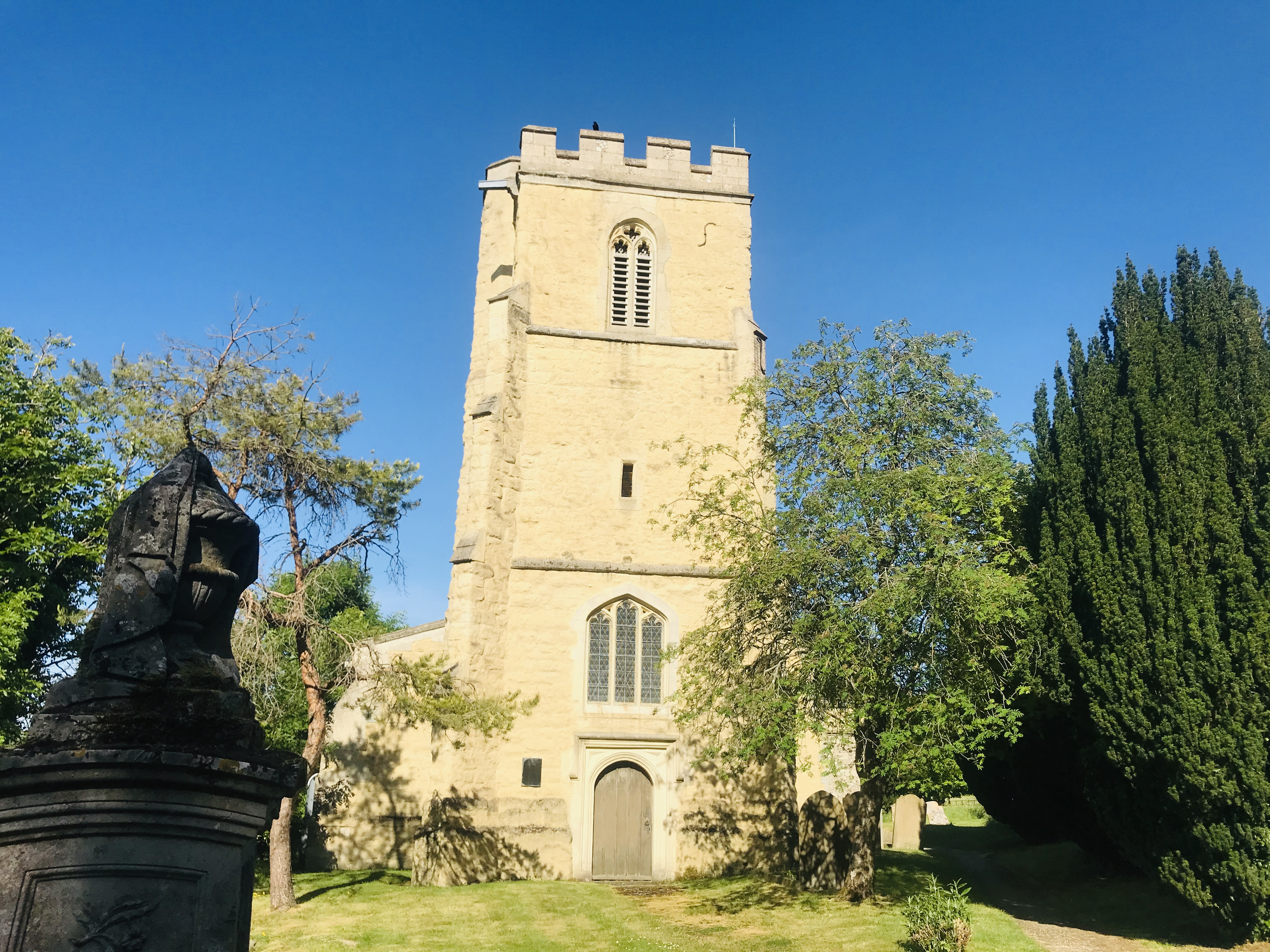
- St Mary's Church, Pitstone, from the west

- Location in Buckinghamshire
- OS grid reference: SP 942 150
- Location: Pitstone, Buckinghamshire
- Country: England
- Denomination: Church of England
- Website: Churches Conservation Trust

History
- Founded: c.1250
- Dedication: St Mary the Virgin

Architecture
- Functional status: Redundant
- Heritage designation: Grade I
- Designated: 18 October 1966
- Architectural type: Church
- Style: Gothic

Specifications
- Materials: Limestone and flint with some brick

St Mary's Church is a redundant Anglican church in the village of Pitstone, Buckinghamshire, England. It is recorded in the National Heritage List for England as a designated Grade I listed building, and is under the care of the Churches Conservation Trust. The church stands to the southeast of the village, some 9 miles (14 km) east of Aylesbury.

== History ==
The earliest parts of the church are chancel and north chapel which date from about 1250. Some carved fragments of stone dating from the 12th century indicate that an earlier church stood on the site. The north and south aisles were added in the later part of the 13th century. During the 15th century the chancel was lengthened, the north vestry and the tower were added, the nave arcades were demolished and the north arcade was rebuilt. The church was restored in 1893. A further restoration took place during the 20th century. The church was declared redundant on 23 January 1973, and was vested in the Churches Conservation Trust on 28 June 1974. It is cared for by a group known as the Friends of Pitstone Church. The church is open to visitors on Sunday afternoons in the summer. Events and occasional services are held in the church.

== Architecture ==
=== Exterior ===
The church is constructed in limestone and flint. The upper part of the nave walls and the north aisle are roughcast. Brick repairs have been carried out to the chancel, and the roofs are covered in lead. The plan consists of a wide nave, incorporating the former south aisle, a north aisle, a south porch, a chancel with a chapel and a vestry to the north, and a west tower. The axis of the chancel is inclined to the north. The tower is in three stages, and has diagonal buttresses, an octagonal southeast stair turret, and an embattled parapet. In the bottom stage is a west doorway, above which is a three-light window. In the middle stage on the north, west and south sides is a slit window. On the south side of the top stage are two lancet bell openings; on the other sides the bell openings have two lights. The south wall of the nave has a plain parapet, two three-light windows, and a projection at the east for a stairway to the rood loft. The south porch also has a plain parapet. Along the wall of the north aisle are buttresses, two lancet windows, and a doorway. The north chapel has a plain parapet, and two Perpendicular style windows. At the east end of the vestry is a lancet window. The chancel is in Decorated style, with a battlemented brick parapet with a stone coping, a three-light east window, and three two-light windows in the south wall.

=== Interior ===
In the south wall of the nave near the door is a stoup, and to its east is the entry to the rood loft stairs. In the east wall is a squint. The north arcade has three bays with octagonal piers. In the north chapel is a piscina with a crocketted gable, a recess in the north wall, and a 19th-century grate in the northeast corner. The chancel is floored with tiles from the 14th and 15th centuries. The font dates from the 12th century and has a fluted bowl and stem. The 17th-century pulpit is hexagonal and has a sounding board. The triangular reading desk is dated 1685. The altar table and the pews also date from the 17th century; two of the pews are box pews. The 18th-century communion rails have twisted balusters. The east window contains stained glass from the 19th century. Also in the church is a small brass dating from the 14th century depicting a female figure. Over the chancel arch is a painting of royal arms dated 1733, flanked by painted panels containing the Ten Commandments and the Lord's Prayer. The single-manual organ was built in 1858 by A. W. Bryant. There is a ring of three bells, although they are no longer ringable. The oldest bell was cast in 1652 by Anthony Chandler, and the other two in 1786 by Robert Patrick.

== See also ==
- List of churches preserved by the Churches Conservation Trust in South East England
