= Postal counties of the United Kingdom =

Subdivisions of the United Kingdom

Postal counties
- Also known as: Former postal counties
- Category: Postal geography
- Location: United Kingdom
- Created: Derived from historic counties; Major revision 1974
- Abolished: 1996
- Number: 116 (as of 1996)
- Possible types: England (48); Northern Ireland (6); Scotland (54); Wales (8)
- Subdivisions: Post town

The postal counties of the United Kingdom, now known as former postal counties, were postal subdivisions in routine use by the Royal Mail until 1996. The purpose of the postal county – as opposed to any other kind of county – was to aid the sorting of mail by differentiating between similar post towns. Since 1996 this has been done by using the outward code (first half) of the postcode instead. For operational reasons, the former postal counties, although broadly based on the counties of the United Kingdom, did not match up with their boundaries; in some cases there were significant differences. The boundaries changed over time as post towns were created or amended.

According to the Royal Mail, the former postal county data no longer forms part of postal addresses. It was removed from the Postcode Address File database in 2000 and does not form part of its code of practice for changing addresses. Despite this, county data is routinely sold to companies, ostensibly to let them cleanse their own address data. As the former postal county data was the last to be in routine use, some organisations have continued to use this obsolete data as part of postal addresses. In 2009, the Royal Mail code of practice consultation included discussion of the possible replacement of the currently supplied "alias data" with an up-to-date county information data field. In 2010, the regulator advised Royal Mail to cease supply of county data altogether, and a timetable was put in place for this to occur between 2013 and 2016.

== Origins ==
In the 19th century and early 20th centuries, the Post Office required the name of the post town to be included in addresses, but advised against including the name of the county. The exception was if a post town's name was not unique, in which case the county name was to be included in the address in order to distinguish between post towns of the same name.

Sometime between 1920 and 1934 the Post Office changed its advice on counties. It recommended instead that the name of the county in which the post town lay should be included in most cases, with the exception of certain large towns and cities and those which gave their name to the county.

== Differences ==
As the name of the county to be used in the postal address was derived from the post town, there were various scenarios where there were differences between the postal county and the geographic or administrative counties:

=== Places part of a post town in another county ===
First, many of the approximately 1,500 post towns straddled county boundaries, and the postal addresses of all places in such areas included the postal county of the post town, regardless of their actual location. In a written answer in the House of Lords in 1963, Lord Chesham, Parliamentary Secretary at the Ministry of Transport estimated that about 7% of towns and villages with a post office lay in a postal county different from their geographical county. He went to explain that:

Postal addresses are in effect routing instructions for Post Office sorters and, in settling what they should be, the main concern is to ensure a quick and efficient service at reasonable cost. The general aim is to align postal boundaries with those of the counties and where this has not been done it is usually because road and rail communications are such that mail can be got more quickly and efficiently to and from certain villages, et cetera, via a neighbouring county than via the county in which they are situated. Alignment of postal and county boundaries in these instances would mean either a poorer postal service for the villages, et cetera, in question or prohibitively heavy additional costs.

— John Cavendish, 5th Baron Chesham, Parliamentary Secretary at the Ministry of Transport written answer to Parliamentary question

Examples, usually consisting of small villages near to county boundaries, included:

Geographic locality	Geographic county	Post town	Former postal county
Chenies	Buckinghamshire	RICKMANSWORTH	Hertfordshire
Chirbury	Shropshire (England)	MONTGOMERY	Powys (Wales)
Hinwick and Podington	Bedfordshire	WELLINGBOROUGH	Northamptonshire
Melbourn	Cambridgeshire	ROYSTON	Hertfordshire
Pitstone	Buckinghamshire	LEIGHTON BUZZARD	Bedfordshire
Shirebrook	Derbyshire	MANSFIELD	Nottinghamshire
Tatsfield	Surrey	WESTERHAM	Kent
Ugley and Molehill Green	Essex	BISHOP'S STORTFORD	Hertfordshire
Woodcote and Sonning Common	Oxfordshire	READING	Berkshire (Note: Because the post town was a special post town, the postal county was not required.)

There were additional examples resulting from the 1974 reorganisation of local government:

Geographic locality	Ceremonial county	Post town	Former postal county
Birtley	Tyne and Wear	CHESTER LE STREET	County Durham
Coleshill and Water Orton	Warwickshire	BIRMINGHAM	West Midlands
Seaton Delaval	Northumberland	WHITLEY BAY	Tyne and Wear (Note: The postal county was Northumberland before 1974.)
Sedgefield	County Durham	STOCKTON-ON-TEES	Cleveland
Stokesley and Great Ayton	North Yorkshire	MIDDLESBROUGH	Cleveland

The postal counties were subject to change over time as post towns near to county boundaries were amended. For example, Chinley in Derbyshire had a postal address of "Stockport, Cheshire" which was later updated to "High Peak, Derbyshire" when a new post town was created.

=== London ===
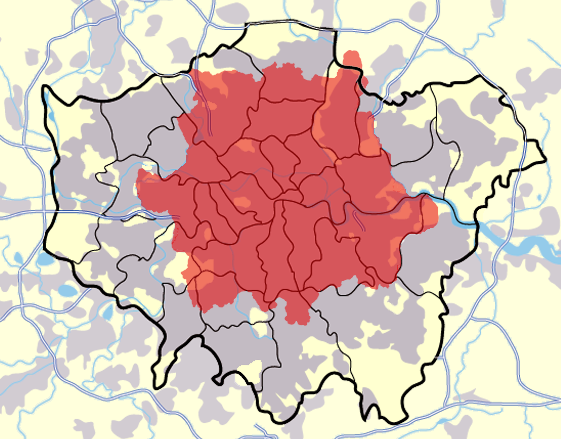
London postal district shown (in red) against the Greater London boundary

Middlesex former postal county

Second, the London postal district, which formed a special post town, did not conform to any administrative boundaries. The postal district was created in 1858 and has periodically been revised. However, at no point has its boundary coincided with either the metropolis (later County of London) of 1855–1965, which was somewhat smaller, or the Greater London area created in 1965, which was much bigger. Addresses in the London post town, an area of 241 square miles (620 km^{2}) (or 40% of Greater London), did not include a county; however, the rest of Greater London (60% of its area) formed parts of other post towns in the postal counties of Surrey, Kent, Essex, Middlesex and Hertfordshire. For example, Wembley Stadium had a postal address of Wembley, Middlesex rather than London. Some London boroughs were split between multiple postal counties: for example Barnet had sections in the London postal district (e.g. Golders Green) and in the Middlesex and Hertfordshire postal counties (e.g. Edgware and East Barnet); with the NW7 postcode district touching the Greater London boundary to divide the three sections. Sewardstone, in the Epping Forest district of Essex, is the only locality outside Greater London to be included in the London postal district (E4).

=== Changes to administrative county boundaries ===
Third, the Royal Mail adopted some, but not all, of the local government reforms of 1965 and 1974/5. This caused postal counties in some areas to reflect boundary changes, while in other areas they did not. Although the Post Office did not follow the changes of the London Government Act 1963 with respect to the outer London suburbs, it did reflect the move of Potters Bar from Middlesex to Hertfordshire. In contrast, Middlesex remained part of the postal address for Staines, Sunbury and Ashford, which had transferred to Surrey. The 1960s saw an increase in the number of addresses the Post Office delivered to, but a decrease in the volume of mail sent, which caused a significant drop in revenue and a proportionate increase in operational costs. Furthermore, retaining the existing postal county boundaries was explained as largely due to cost reasons. The Times pointed out that this might cause confusion, noting that in future "children will no doubt wonder why their address should refer to a county in which they have never lived", but that "some people […] want the name of Middlesex preserved because of its historical associations".

The Local Government Act 1972 redrew the administrative county map of England and Wales outside Greater London. The Post Office was considering its policy in January 1973, and in November 1973 noted that "Greater Manchester" would be unlikely to be adopted because of confusion of the Manchester post town, but that Avon was likely to be introduced. When the local government changes came into force, the Post Office announced that the new counties would form part of postal addresses from 1 July 1974, and should be used as "soon as possible". Old counties could, however, still be used until 1 July 1975. It was stated that the rule applied to: "...addresses throughout England and Wales outside Greater London with the exception of Greater Manchester and Hereford and Worcester where addresses remain unchanged. In Humberside it is necessary to show whether an address is in North Humberside or South Humberside. Addresses in certain post-towns have not, in the past, included a county name; these addresses are unchanged, but the postcode should be shown. Addresses in Greater London are also unchanged as are addresses in any place where the new county bears the same name as the former one." The postal counties listed in 1961 that did not continue after the reforms were Cumberland, Rutland, Sussex, Westmorland and Yorkshire.

In Scotland, counties were entirely abolished for local government purposes in May 1975. The matter of postal counties was raised in the House of Lords in April 1975. Lord Beswick, Minister of State at the Department of Industry, stated that "the Post Office is consulting its customers in Scotland about the possible use of new postal addresses for Scotland based on the new local government Regions and Island Areas". In the event, the postal counties were not changed. Thus Alva, despite being in the Central Region after 1975, was still postally in Clackmannanshire. Gordon Oakes, Parliamentary Under Secretary of State at the Department of the Environment, explained the policy in a written answer to a question in parliament, shortly after the changes were brought in:

Postal addresses are routing instructions, not geographical descriptions, and the extent to which the new county names are being adopted for mail has been the subject of advice issued by the Post Office.

=== Special post towns ===
The postal county was omitted for addresses within 125 post towns. These were mainly either larger towns and cities or places where the county name was derived from the post town. These post towns were:

- ABERDEEN
- ANTRIM
- ARMAGH
- AYR
- BANFF
- BATH
- BEDFORD
- BELFAST
- BERWICK-UPON-TWEED
- BIRMINGHAM
- BLACKBURN
- BLACKPOOL
- BOLTON
- BOURNEMOUTH
- BRIGHTON
- BRISTOL
- BROMLEY
- BUCKINGHAM
- CAMBRIDGE
- CARDIFF
- CARLISLE
- CHELMSFORD
- CHESTER
- CLACKMANNAN
- CLACTON-ON-SEA
- COLCHESTER
- COVENTRY
- CREWE
- CROYDON
- DARTFORD
- DERBY
- DUMBARTON
- DUMFRIES
- DUNDEE
- DURHAM
- EDINBURGH
- EXETER
- FALKIRK
- GLASGOW
- GLOUCESTER
- HEREFORD
- HERTFORD
- HOUNSLOW
- HUDDERSFIELD
- HULL
- INVERNESS
- IPSWICH
- ISLE OF ARRAN
- ISLE OF BARRA
- ISLE OF BENBECULA
- ISLE OF BUTE
- ISLE OF CANNA
- ISLE OF COLL
- ISLE OF COLONSAY
- ISLE OF CUMBRAE
- ISLE OF EIGG
- ISLE OF GIGHA
- ISLE OF HARRIS
- ISLE OF IONA
- ISLE OF ISLAY
- ISLE OF JURA
- ISLE OF LEWIS
- ISLE OF MULL
- ISLE OF NORTH UIST
- ISLE OF RUM
- ISLE OF SCALPAY
- ISLE OF SKYE
- ISLE OF SOUTH UIST
- ISLE OF TIREE
- ISLES OF SCILLY
- KINROSS
- KIRKCUDBRIGHT
- LANARK
- LANCASTER
- LEEDS
- LEICESTER
- LINCOLN
- LIVERPOOL
- LONDON
- LONDONDERRY
- LUTON
- MANCHESTER
- MILTON KEYNES
- NAIRN
- NEWCASTLE UPON TYNE
- NORTHAMPTON
- NORWICH
- NOTTINGHAM
- OLDHAM
- ORKNEY
- OXFORD
- PEEBLES
- PERTH
- PETERBOROUGH
- PLYMOUTH
- PORTSMOUTH
- PRESTON
- READING
- REDHILL
- RENFREW
- ROMFORD
- SALFORD
- SALISBURY
- SELKIRK
- SHEFFIELD
- SHETLAND
- SHREWSBURY
- SLOUGH
- SOUTHAMPTON
- SOUTHEND-ON-SEA
- STAFFORD
- STIRLING
- STOKE-ON-TRENT
- SUNDERLAND
- SWANSEA
- SWINDON
- TORQUAY
- TWICKENHAM
- WALSALL
- WARRINGTON
- WARWICK
- WATFORD
- WOLVERHAMPTON
- WORCESTER
- YORK

The post towns of BRECON, CAERNARVON, CARDIGAN, CARMARTHEN, DENBIGH, FLINT, HUNTINGDON, MONMOUTH, MONTGOMERY and PEMBROKE also qualified as special post towns until 1974 as the name of the county was derived from the town. Following the Local Government Act 1972, addresses in these post towns required the new postal county.

== Postal counties in operation from 1974 to 1996 ==
listed with official abbreviations, if any

=== England ===
Postal counties broadly matched the county boundaries established in 1974, unless noted otherwise under "geographic coverage".

Former postal county	Abbreviation	Geographic coverage	Map ref
Avon			1
Bedfordshire	Beds		2
Berkshire	Berks		3
Buckinghamshire	Bucks		4
Cambridgeshire	Cambs		5
Cheshire		Significant differences from the county boundaries established in 1974; also extended into Greater Manchester	6
Cleveland			7
Cornwall			8
County Durham	Co Durham		9
Cumbria		Also extended into Northumberland and Dumfries & Galloway	10
Derbyshire			11
Devon			12
Dorset			13
East Sussex	E Sussex		14
Essex		Significant differences from the county boundaries established in 1974; also extended into Greater London; Stansted post town (CM24 postcode) is an exclave of the Essex postal county wholly within the Hertfordshire postal county	15
Gloucestershire	Glos		16
Hampshire	Hants		17
Herefordshire		Covered part of Hereford and Worcester; also extended into Powys.	18
Hertfordshire	Herts	Significant differences from the county boundaries established in 1974; also extended into Greater London	19
Isle of Wight			20
Kent		Also extended into Greater London	21
Lancashire	Lancs	Significant differences from the county boundaries established in 1974; also extended into Cumbria, Greater Manchester, North Yorkshire and West Yorkshire	22
Leicestershire	Leics		23
Lincolnshire	Lincs		24
London		Not a postal county, but the London postal district corresponded to the London post town	25
Merseyside			26
Middlesex	Middx	Covered parts of Greater London and Surrey; Enfield post town was an exclave, separated from the rest by the London postal district and Hertfordshire	27
Norfolk			28
North Humberside	N Humberside	Covered part of Humberside	29
North Yorkshire	N Yorkshire		30
Northamptonshire	Northants		31
Northumberland	Northd	Significant differences from the county boundaries established in 1974; consisted of two unconnected areas divided by Tyne & Wear (NE19 postcode)	32
Nottinghamshire	Notts		33
Oxfordshire	Oxon		34
Shropshire	Salop		35
Somerset			36
South Humberside	S Humberside	Covered part of Humberside	37
South Yorkshire	S Yorkshire		38
Staffordshire	Staffs		39
Suffolk			40
Surrey		Significant differences from the county boundaries established in 1974; also extended into Greater London and did not include Spelthorne (included in Middlesex)	41
Tyne and Wear	Tyne & Wear	Significant differences from the county boundaries established in 1974; long salient into Northumberland all the way to the Scottish border (NE19 postcode)	42
Warwickshire	Warks	Significant differences from the county boundaries established in 1974; consisted of two unconnected areas divided by West Midlands (i.e. the easterly salient of the Coventry post town)	43
West Midlands	W Midlands	Significant differences from the county boundaries established in 1974; extended into Warwickshire all the way to the Leicestershire border (CV7 postcode)	44
West Sussex	W Sussex		45
West Yorkshire	W Yorkshire		46
Wiltshire	Wilts		47
Worcestershire	Worcs	Covered part of Hereford and Worcester	48

=== Scotland ===
The postal counties of Scotland broadly followed the boundaries of the civil counties on the mainland. Offshore islands, however, were regarded as distinct counties for postal purposes. There was no postal county of Buteshire, which was instead divided between the Isles of Arran, Bute and Cumbrae.

Former postal county	Geographic coverage	Map ref
Aberdeenshire	Approximated to 1890–1975 county, plus the former 1890-1975 counties of Banffshire and Kincardineshire; and less Aberdeen post town	49
Angus	Approximated to 1890–1975 county less areas in Dundee post town	50
Argyll	Approximated to 1890–1975 county less islands	51
Ayrshire	Approximated to 1890–1975 county	52
Banffshire	Approximated to 1890–1975 county	53
Berwickshire	Approximated to 1890–1975 county	54
Caithness	Approximated to 1890–1975 county	55
Clackmannanshire	Approximated to 1890–1975 county	56
Dumfriesshire	Approximated to 1890–1975 county	57
Dunbartonshire	Approximated to 1890–1975 county, comprising two separate areas	58
East Lothian	Approximated to 1890–1975 county	59
Fife	Approximated to 1890–1975 county	60
Inverness-shire	Approximated to 1890–1975 county less islands	61
Isle of Arran		62
Isle of Barra		63
Isle of Benbecula		64
Isle of Bute		65
Isle of Canna		66
Isle of Coll		67
Isle of Colonsay		68
Isle of Cumbrae		69
Isle of Eigg		70
Isle of Gigha		71
Isle of Harris		72
Isle of Iona		73
Isle of Islay		74
Isle of Jura		75

Former postal county	Geographic coverage	Map ref
Isle of Lewis		76
Isle of Mull		77
Isle of North Uist		78
Isle of Rum		79
Isle of Scalpay		80
Isle of Skye		81
Isle of South Uist		82
Isle of Tiree		83
Kincardineshire	Approximated to 1890–1975 county	84
Kinross-shire	Approximated to 1890–1975 county	85
Kirkcudbrightshire	Approximated to 1890–1975 county	86
Lanarkshire	Approximated to 1890–1975 county less areas in Glasgow post town	87
Midlothian	Approximated to 1890–1975 county less Edinburgh post town	88
Morayshire	Approximated to 1890–1975 county less areas now in Aberdeenshire	89
Nairnshire	Approximated to 1890–1975 county	90
Orkney	Covered 1890–1975 county and modern islands area	91
Peeblesshire	Approximated to 1890–1975 county	92
Perthshire	Approximated to 1890–1975 county less areas in Dundee post town and Dunblane, Doune, Callendar, Trossachs, Loch Earn, Killin, Crianlarich & Tyndrum areas now in Stirling District and later renamed as Stirling Council Area (though this is mistakenly referred to as "Stirlingshire")	93
Renfrewshire	Approximated to 1890–1975 county	94
Ross-shire	Approximated to 1890–1975 county of Ross and Cromarty less islands	95
Roxburghshire	Approximated to 1890–1975 county	96
Selkirkshire	Approximated to 1890–1975 county	97
Shetland	Covered 1890–1975 county of Zetland and modern islands area of Shetland	98
Stirlingshire	Approximated to 1890–1975 county; plus Dunblane, Doune, Callendar, Trossachs, Loch Earn, Killin, Crianlarich and Tyndrum areas transferred to Stirling District and later named Stirling Council Area.	99
Sutherland	Approximated to 1890–1975 county	100
West Lothian	Approximated to 1890–1975 county less Queensferry, Dalmeny, Ratho and Kirkliston areas now in the City of Edinburgh	101
Wigtownshire	Approximated to 1890–1975 county	102

=== Wales ===
Former postal county	Abbreviation	Geographic coverage	Map ref
Clwyd		Broadly matched the 1974–1996 counties	103
Dyfed		Broadly matched the 1974–1996 counties	104
Gwent		Broadly matched the 1974–1996 counties	105
Gwynedd		Broadly matched the 1974–1996 counties	106
Mid Glamorgan	M Glam	Broadly matched the 1974–1996 counties	107
South Glamorgan	S Glam	Broadly matched the 1974–1996 counties	108
Powys		Broadly matched the 1974–1996 counties	109
West Glamorgan	W Glam	Broadly matched the 1974–1996 counties	110

=== Northern Ireland ===
Former postal county	Abbreviation	Map ref
County Antrim	Co Antrim	111
County Armagh	Co Armagh	112
County Down	Co Down	113
County Fermanagh	Co Fermanagh	114
County Londonderry	Co Londonderry	115
County Tyrone	Co Tyrone	116

Normally, counties in Northern Ireland are named with the word 'County', and not simply the county name, perhaps to avoid confusion with the towns of the same name.

== After 1996 ==
=== Postcode defined circulation ===
The Royal Mail ceased to use postal counties as a means of sorting mail following the modernisation of their optical character recognition equipment in 1996. Instead, using postcode defined circulation, the outward code (first half) of the postcode is used to differentiate between like-sounding post towns. In 2000 the postal county data was removed from the Postcode Address File database and was added to the Alias File, which is used to cleanse data of local, colloquial and "postally-not-required" details that have been added to addresses. According to Royal Mail policy the field is not updated and where new post towns are created they will not be assigned to a former postal county. In guidance to customers it is required that the correct post town and postcode must be included in addresses and a county is not required. As part of a "flexible addressing policy" customers can add a county, which will be ignored in the sorting process.

=== 1990s local government reform ===
During the 1990s a reform of local government in England caused further changes to the locations in which the former postal counties did not match up to the geographic counties. Avon, Cleveland and Humberside were abolished as geographic counties and Rutland was reconstituted. This had the following effects on the relationship between the geographic and postal counties:

Former postal county	Coverage
Avon	Bristol, Somerset (part), Gloucestershire (part)
Cleveland	County Durham (part), North Yorkshire (part)
North Humberside	East Riding of Yorkshire
South Humberside	Lincolnshire (part)
Leicestershire (part)	Rutland

Hereford and Worcester was abolished and reconstituted as two separate counties once more, broadly matching the former postal counties. Greater London and Greater Manchester remained unaffected by the reform. Local government was also reorganised in 1996 in both Scotland (Local Government etc. (Scotland) Act 1994) and Wales (Local Government (Wales) Act 1994), such that in some places counties reverted to the historic names once again (e.g. Pembrokeshire), but in others the post-1974 names were retained (e.g. Powys and Gwynedd). As the Royal Mail had also declared postal counties redundant in 1996, the former postal county data was not updated to reflect these changes.

=== Extended usage ===
Despite Royal Mail stipulating that counties no longer form part of addresses, many organisations have continued routinely to include them as part of postal addressing, often simply combining Postcode Address File data with the data from the Alias File. Some organisations using software which requires a county to be included as part of a postal address have extended the use of counties to addresses in special post towns, which never needed them.

This continued use has caused customers in areas where there is discrepancy between the postal and geographic counties to complain to Royal Mail. Until 2007 the Royal Mail position was that under their current code of practice, changes to county data will not be considered. However, after a lengthy and well-organised campaign, the Royal Mail agreed to create a postal county of Rutland in 2007. This was achieved in January 2008 by amending the former postal county for all of the Oakham (LE15) post town and part of the Market Harborough (LE16) post town. In contrast, Seaton Delaval residents had unsuccessfully campaigned in 2004 to be removed from the former postal county of Tyne and Wear.

In 2009 the Royal Mail code of practice came up for renewal, and the regulator Postcomm held a public consultation on its future. Consultation guidance from the regulator indicated that although the former postal county data is obsolete, it was the last available data set to be in routine use and was therefore the most likely to be used by corporate customers for their address databases. It was also recognised that residential customers in some areas were not happy with this situation. The Royal Mail reconfirmed its preference for eliminating counties altogether from addressing, but also invited comments on providing a new and updated county data field, reflecting boundary changes. Postcomm found that many respondents objected to the use of obsolete counties. In May 2010 Postcomm decided to advise Royal Mail to "discontinue provision of such information at the earliest opportunity". However, because some existing software included the use of counties, Royal Mail was advised not to implement the change before 2013. The timetable announced by Royal Mail in July 2010 indicated that this was likely to happen between 2013 and 2016.

In 2013 Felicity MacFarlane stated the Royal Mail position:

As we have stressed for a number of years, Royal Mail's Postcode Address File does not contain county names as they are not required for postal purposes. However, we do make a list of historical county names available to customers to reference if they wish though we don't encourage external organisations to use or rely on the county information.

Between November and December 2013 a further consultation on the issue was conducted by the PAF Advisory Board that sought opinions on removing some or all of the county data from the Alias File and the results were published in January 2014.
