= Pitstone Hill =

Hill in England

Coordinates: 51.8215°N 0.622343°W

- Site of Special Scientific Interest
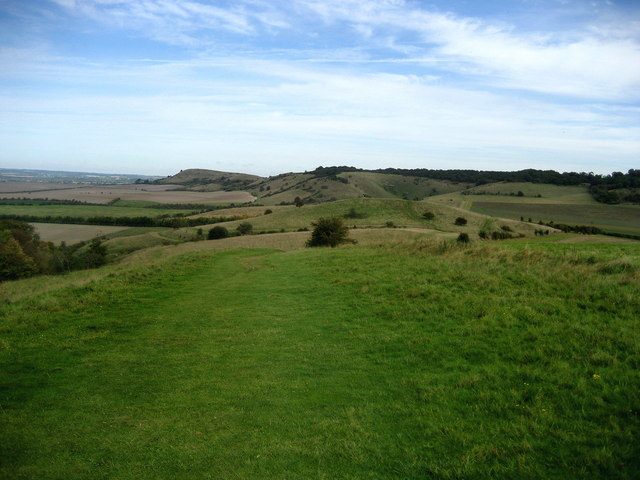
- Location of Pitstone Hill.
- Area of search: Buckinghamshire
- Grid reference: SP950145
- Interest: Biological
- Area: 22.9 ha (57 acres)
- Notification date: 1984
- Location map: Magic Map

Pitstone Hill is a 22.9-hectare (57-acre) biological Site of Special Scientific Importance east of Pitstone in Buckinghamshire. It is in the Chilterns Area of Outstanding Natural Beauty, and is crossed by the Ridgeway National Trail.

The site is chalk grassland on a steeply sloping hill, with small areas of woodland and scrub. The richest areas botanically are the lower and steeper slopes, with plants including the nationally scarce pasque flower and field fleawort. Twenty-six species of butterfly have been recorded, and breeding birds include skylarks, meadow pipits and willow warblers.

There is access from Stocks Road.
