= Pitstone Quarry =

Coordinates: 51.820887°N 0.647028°W

- Site of Special Scientific Interest
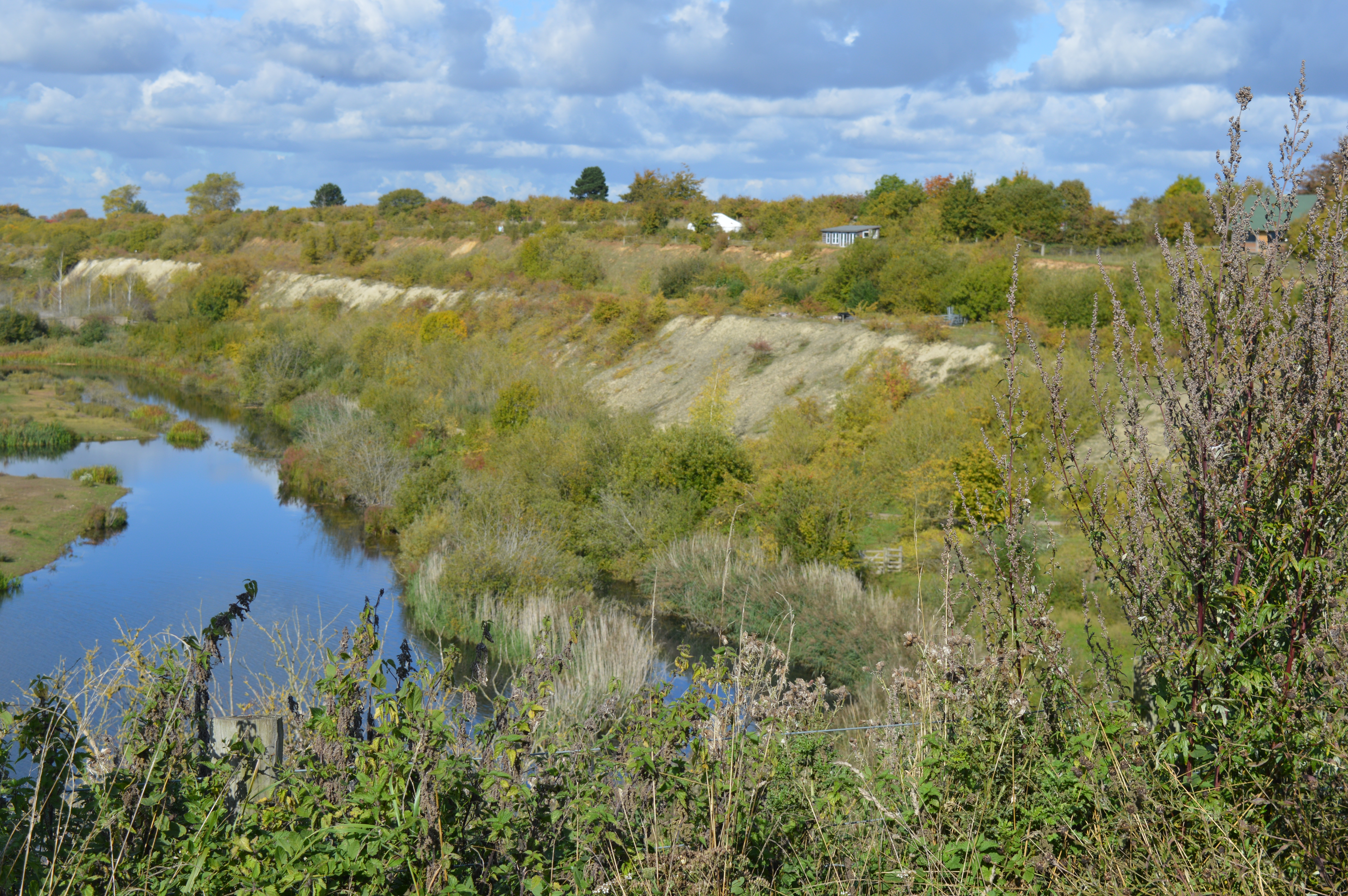
- Location of Pitstone Quarry.
- Area of search: Buckinghamshire
- Grid reference: TQ013842
- Interest: Geological
- Area: 10.3 ha (25 acres)
- Notification date: 1988
- Location map: Magic Map

Pitstone Quarry is a 10.3-hectare (25-acre) geological Site of Special Scientific Interest in Pitstone, Buckinghamshire. It is the area between the lake and the railway line in College Lake nature reserve.

The site exposes deposits of the Middle and Late Pleistocene, during the last half-million years. Most sediments are the result of solifluction, repeated slippage during ice ages, with channels in the slopes filled with sediments. The most recent warm period, the Ipswichian around 125,000 years ago, contains hippopotamus fossils. According to Natural England evaluation continues and "the results are eagerly awaited".

There is access to College Lake from Upper Icknield Way, but the most important exposure is in an area closed to the public.

== In popular culture ==
Parts of the MCU film Deadpool & Wolverine were filmed at the quarry in summer 2023.
