= College Lake nature reserve =

Local nature reserve in Buckinghamshire, England

Coordinates: 51.8201°N 0.6501°W

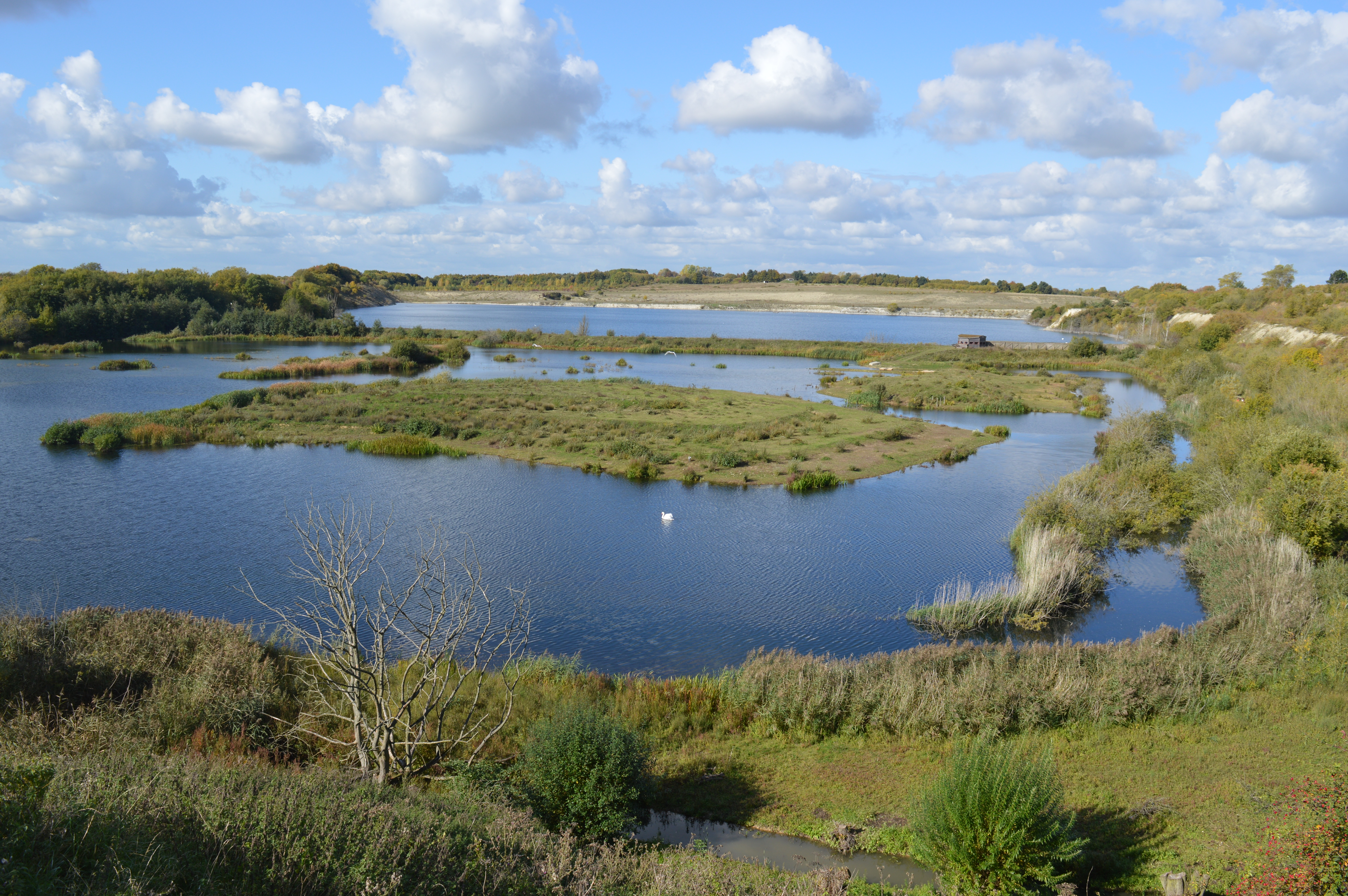

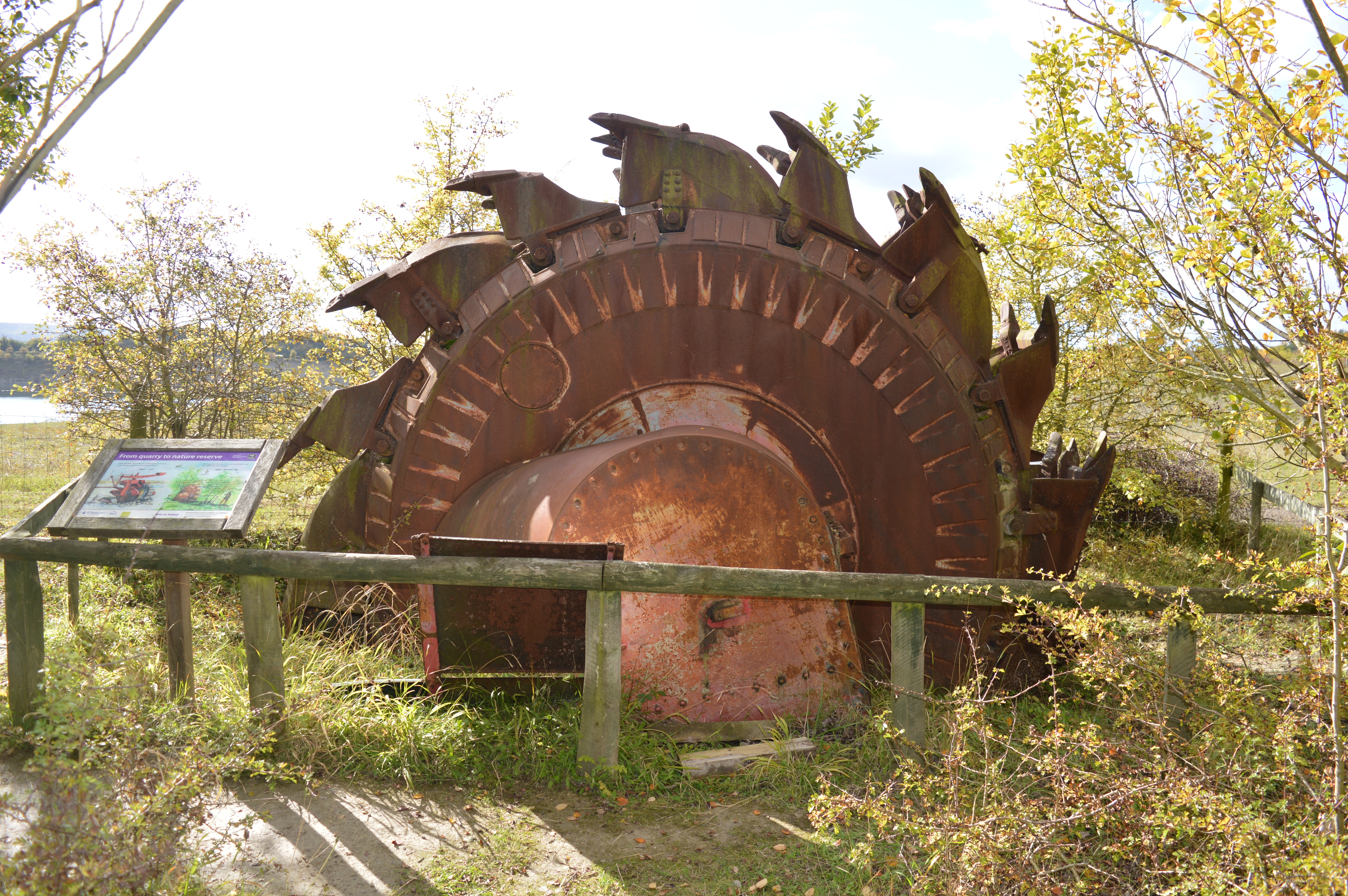
A chalk cutting machine preserved from the site's days as a chalk quarry

College Lake is a 65 hectare nature reserve in a former chalk quarry in Pitstone in the Aylesbury Vale district of Buckinghamshire. It is one of the flagship reserves of the Berkshire, Buckinghamshire and Oxfordshire Wildlife Trust, and it has an information centre, education facilities, a café, toilets and a shop. It is in the Chilterns Area of Outstanding Natural Beauty. The area east of the lake is a geological Site of Special Scientific Interest called Pitstone Quarry.

The site has more than a thousand species of wildlife on the lake, marshland and grassland. Rare species include Lapwings, which nest on islands in the lake, and redwing. The marshes are an important habitat for breeding waders. The grassland has a variety of flowers, which support a variety of insects, birds and mammals.

The visitor centre opened to the public in 2010.

During the late 20th century College Lake was a working quarry and the chalk was excavated and made into cement for use in building construction. Many fossils, including ammonites and sea urchins, were uncovered during the excavations and fossils from the site are on display in the visitor centre .

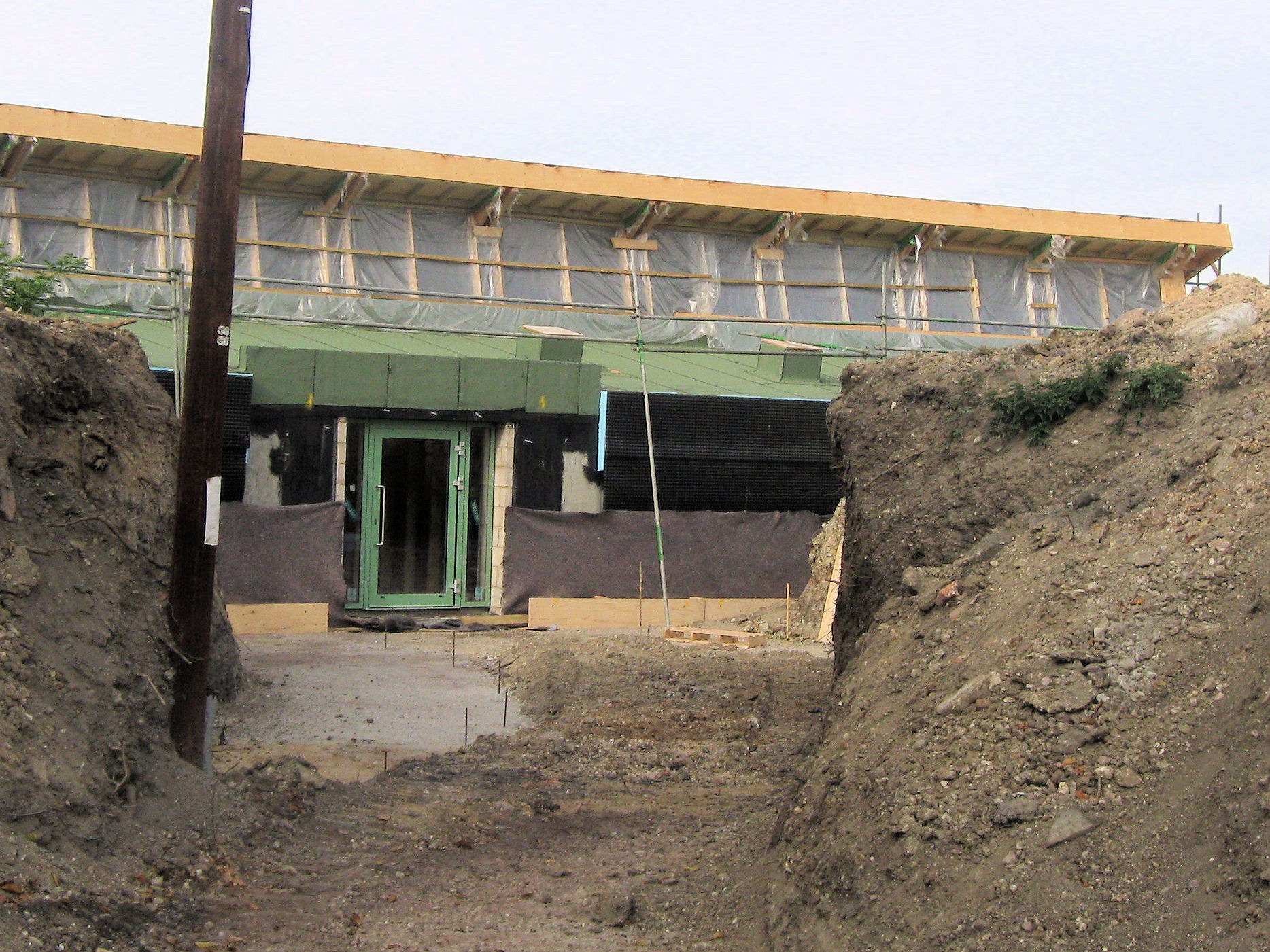
Entrance to the visitor centre, under construction in 2009

There is access from the Upper Icknield Way.

The site takes its name from College farm that existed here before quarrying started in the twentieth century. The farm buildings were located on the rising ground on the north side of the present lake. The farm in turn took its name from Trinity College Cambridge which owned the land.
