= Pitstone =

Village in Buckinghamshire, England

Coordinates: 51.82564°N 0.63020°W

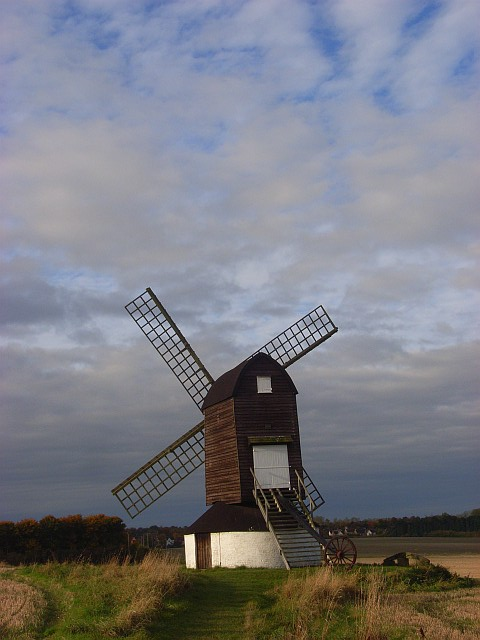
- Pitstone Windmill

- Location within Buckinghamshire
- Area: 6.65 km^{2} (2.57 sq mi)
- Population: 2,952 (2011)
  - Density: 444/km^{2} (1,150/sq mi)
- OS grid reference: SP943150
- Civil parish: Pitstone
- Unitary authority: Buckinghamshire
- Ceremonial county: Buckinghamshire
- Region: South East
- Country: England
- Sovereign state: United Kingdom
- Post town: LEIGHTON BUZZARD
- Postcode district: LU7
- Dialling code: 01296
- Police: Thames Valley
- Fire: Buckinghamshire
- Ambulance: South Central
- UK Parliament: Aylesbury

Pitstone (formerly Pightelsthorn, with possible variation Pychelesthorn in 1399) is a village and civil parish in east Buckinghamshire, England. It is at the foot of the central range of the Chiltern Hills, centred 6 miles (10 km) east of Aylesbury and 5 miles (8 km) south of Leighton Buzzard. It directly adjoins the village of Ivinghoe, and the two villages share some facilities. Being close to the Hertfordshire border Pitstone shares many amenities such as doctors, dentists etc with the close by market town of Tring.

== History ==
The village name is Anglo-Saxon in origin, and means 'Picel's thorn tree'. It was recorded in the Domesday Book of 1086 as Pincelestorne.

Pitstone was given to the abbey at Ashridge by the Earl of Cornwall in 1283. In 1290 King Edward I spent Christmas in Pitstone at the estate that had been given to the abbey, and stayed for five weeks, during which time he held parliament in Ashridge. His stay caused great inconvenience to the local inhabitants of the village who were legally obliged to keep the king and his court.

It was described in a Victorian gazetteer by John Marius Wilson as "7 miles in length and 1 in breadth. Post-town, Tring. Acres, 2,836 [2,836 acres (11.48 km^{2})] Real property, £3,692. Pop., 581. Houses, 109. The property is divided among a few.". Its area dropped between 1851 and 1891 from the said number acres to 1,644. The number of houses rose most steeply in the 1950s, from 169 to 252.

== Landmarks and neighbourhoods ==
Its Castlemead area of housing and business units was named after Castle Cement Company which was the last owner of the Pitstone cement works, which operated from 1937 to 1991.

The area around St Mary's Church is known as Church End.

A notable building is Pitstone Windmill, which is owned by the National Trust. The windmill was formerly capable of rotating to face the prevailing wind, as evidenced by the wheel protruding from one side of the structure. Although it no longer can do so, the wheel remains and its pivot point is clearly visible.

Pitstone Green Museum provides working insights into agricultural history and various supporting trades. The museum is to the south of the village proper on a farm.

Pitstone Hill, above the village, is a Site of Special Scientific Interest (SSSI), designated for its botanical interest. The hill is crossed by the Ridgeway National Trail. A former chalk quarry has been converted to College Lake nature reserve, a flagship reserve of the Berkshire, Buckinghamshire and Oxfordshire Wildlife Trust, and the area east of the lake within the nature reserve is a geological SSSI, Pitstone Quarry.

== Geography ==
The elongated civil parish is semi-urban in the extreme west north-west (WNW) and is otherwise rural and elevated, rising to the opposite direction. Approximately following the north-west border is the Grand Union Canal. Its population rose in the ten years to 1961 from 544 to 766.

== Sport and leisure ==
Pitstone has a Non-League football team Pitstone & Ivinghoe United F.C. who play at The Recreation Ground on Vicarage Road. The village also has a cricket team, Ivinghoe & Pitstone United Cricket Club who play in the Cherwell Cricket League on Saturdays at the Recreation Ground; they also play friendly matches on Sundays and mid-week evening knock-outs. There are records of cricket being played at the Pitstone Recreation Ground since 1856, when the village took on (and beat) Luton.[Bucks Advertiser, 12 July 1856, p. 8 ‘Cricket: Pitstone v Luton’]

Pitstone is the home of cyclist Nick Clarke, who holds the RRA Pembroke to Great Yarmouth "Side to Side" record.

== See also ==
- St Mary's Church, Pitstone
