= North Humberside =

Coordinates: 53.927°N 0.471°W

North Humberside is a former postal county of England. It was introduced by the Royal Mail on 1 July 1974, when some addresses were altered in response to the changes in administration brought about under the Local Government Act 1972.

North Humberside former postal county

The postal county corresponded approximately to the part of the new non-metropolitan county of Humberside north of the Humber estuary (including Goole, which is south of the Humber). All of the post towns included in the North Humberside had formerly been part of the Yorkshire postal county. A changeover period of one year was allowed by the postal authorities, with the new county compulsory from 1 July 1975. It included the following post towns (in the following postcode areas):

- BEVERLEY (HU)
- BRIDLINGTON (YO)
- BROUGH (HU)
- COTTINGHAM (HU)
- DRIFFIELD (YO)
- GOOLE (DN)
- HESSLE (HU)
- HORNSEA (HU)
- HULL (HU)
- NORTH FERRIBY (HU)
- WITHERNSEA (HU)

Hull was a special post town, and letters addressed to Hull did not require a postal county. The postal county of South Humberside was also created at the same time, from areas previously postally in Lincolnshire.

== Abolition ==
In 1996 the Royal Mail ceased to use counties as part of the routing instructions for mail. North Humberside is now a "former postal county". Coincidentally, Humberside was abolished for local government purposes in the same year, with the area north of the Humber becoming two unitary authority areas: East Riding of Yorkshire and Kingston-upon-Hull.

Although counties are no longer used for sorting mail, under the Royal Mail's flexible addressing policy users can choose to add a county to an address as long as the post town and postcode are included. The policy allows for the use of either the "former postal" (N. Humberside), "traditional" (Yorkshire) or "administrative" (East Riding of Yorkshire) county.
