= South Humberside =

Coordinates: 53.6°N 0.5°W

South Humberside former postal county

South Humberside is a former postal county of England. It was introduced by the Royal Mail on 1 July 1974, when some addresses were altered in response to the changes in administration brought about under the Local Government Act 1972.

The postal county corresponded approximately to the part of the new non-metropolitan county of Humberside south of the Humber Estuary (excluding Goole, which was placed in North Humberside). All of the post towns included in South Humberside had formerly been part of the Lincolnshire postal county. A changeover period of one year was allowed by the postal authorities, with the new county compulsory from 1 July 1975.

It included the following post towns, all with DN postcodes:

- BARNETBY
- BARROW-UPON-HUMBER
- BARTON-UPON-HUMBER
- BRIGG
- CLEETHORPES
- GRIMSBY
- IMMINGHAM
- SCUNTHORPE
- ULCEBY

== Abolition ==
In 1996 the Royal Mail ceased to use counties as part of the routing instructions for mail. South Humberside is now a "former postal county". Coincidentally, Humberside was abolished for local government purposes in the same year, with the area south of the Humber becoming two unitary authority areas: North Lincolnshire and North East Lincolnshire.

Although counties are no longer used for sorting mail, under the Royal Mail's flexible addressing policy users can choose to add a county to an address as long as the post town and postcode are included. The policy allows for the use of either the "former postal" (S. Humberside), "traditional" (Lincs.) or "administrative" (North Lincolnshire / North East Lincolnshire) county.
