= Pure =

Pure may refer to:

== Computing ==
- Pure function
- PureSystems, a family of computer systems introduced by IBM in 2012
- Pure Software, a company founded in 1991 by Reed Hastings to support the Purify tool
- Pure-FTPd, FTP server software
- Pure (programming language), functional programming language based on term rewriting
- Pure Storage, a company that makes datacenter storage solutions

== Companies and products ==
- Pure (app), dating app
- Pure (company), a British consumer electronics company specialising in digital radios
- Pure (restaurant chain), a British fast food chain
- Pure Insurance, Privilege Underwriters Reciprocal Exchange
- Pure Trading, a Canadian electronic communication network operated by CNQ
- Pure Oil, a U.S. chain of gas stations
- Propulsion Universelle et Récuperation d'Énergie (PURE), a motorsport engineering company

== Literature ==
- Pure (magazine), a magazine created by Peter Sotos
- Pure (Miller novel), a 2011 novel by Andrew Miller
- Pure (Baggott novel), a 2012 novel by Julianna Baggott
- PURE, 2016 play about chocolate manufacture, commissioned by Mikron Theatre Company

== Radio stations ==
- Pure (Belgian radio station), a former Belgian radio station
- Pure FM (Portsmouth), a university radio station based in Portsmouth, UK
- Pure Radio (Scotland), a former Scottish radio station

== Video games ==
- Pure (video game), an off-road racing video game for Microsoft Windows, Xbox 360 and PlayStation 3

== Establishments ==
- Pure Nightclub, a nightclub in Las Vegas, Nevada

== Music ==
- Pure (Canadian band), a Canadian rock band till 2000

=== Albums ===
- Pure (3 Colours Red album), 1997
- Pure (Godflesh album), 1992
- Pure (Gary Numan album), 2000
- Pure (Hayley Westenra album), 2003
- Pure (In the Woods... album), 2016
- Pure (No Angels album), 2003
- Pure (The Lightning Seeds album), 1996
- Pure (Maksim Mrvica album), 2007
- Pure II, Maksim Mrvica, 2008
- Pure (The Primitives album), 1989
- Pure (The Jesus Lizard album), 1989
- Pure (Lara Fabian album), 1997
- Pure (Pendragon album), 2008
- Pure (Boney James album), 2004
- Pure (Chris Potter album), 1994

=== Songs ===
- "Pure" (song), by The Lightning Seeds, 1989
- "Pure", a song and single by 3 Colours Red from Pure, 1997
- "Pure", a song by Cigarettes After Sex from Cry, 2019
- "Pure", a song by Dream
- "Pure", a song by Endless Shame
- "Pure", a song by Orgy from their 2005 album Punk Statik Paranoia
- "Pure", a song by Paris Angels B-side to "Perfume (Loved Up)", 1991

== Film and television ==
- Pure (2002 film), a 2002 British film
- Pure (2005 film), a 2005 Canadian film
- Pure (2010 film), a 2010 Swedish film
- Pure (Canadian TV series), a 2017 Canadian TV series
- Pure (British TV series), a 2019 UK TV series
- "Pure" (Law & Order: Special Victims Unit), an episode of Law & Order: Special Victims Unit
- "Pure" (Into the Dark), an episode of the first season of Into the Dark

== Places ==
- Pure, Ardennes

== See also ==
- Cleanliness
- Impurity (disambiguation)
- Pure land
- PureGym, a chain of health clubs in the United Kingdom
- Puritans
- Purity (disambiguation)
- Unclean (disambiguation)
