= Halfblood (disambiguation) =

Halfblood often refers to Harry Potter and the Half-Blood Prince.

Halfblood, half-blood or half blood (with whatever capitalization) may also refer to:

- Camp Half-Blood Chronicles, by Rick Riordan
- The Halfblood Chronicles, by Andre Norton and Mercedes Lackey
- Half-blood (Harry Potter), wizards in the Harry Potter universe who have both magical and Muggle ancestors
- Half Blood (mixtape), by Slayr.

== See also ==
- Harry Potter and the Half-Blood Prince (disambiguation)
- Half-breed (disambiguation)
- Blood purity (disambiguation)
- Racial purity
