= IBM North Harbour =

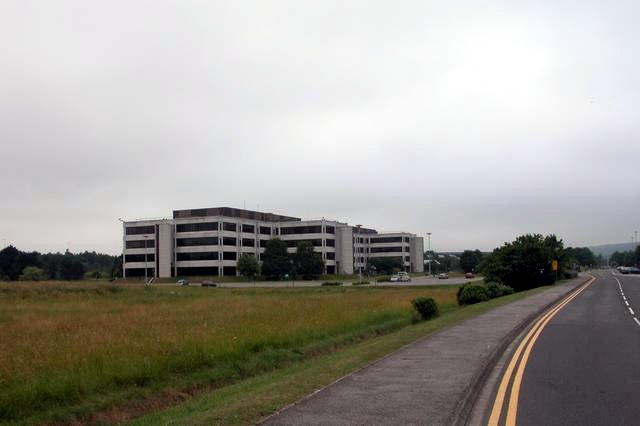
- Seen in July 2005

- Location within Hampshire

General information
- Status: Closed
- Type: Computer company headquarters
- Architectural style: Concrete
- Location: PO6 3AU
- Coordinates: 50.843°N 1.085°W
- Elevation: 10 m (33 ft)
- Current tenants: IBM
- Completed: 1976
- Inaugurated: 3 December 1976
- Closed: 31 October 2024
- Cost: £17.2m
- Client: IBM

Dimensions
- Other dimensions: 125 acres

Technical details
- Floor count: 4
- Floor area: 360,000 sq ft

Design and construction
- Architect: Arup Associates
- Structural engineer: Arup Associates
- Main contractor: Taylor Woodrow Construction

IBM North Harbour is the former headquarters of IBM in the UK. The site is now a larger business park, Lakeside North Harbour, and IBM is no longer present at the site.

== History ==
IBM arrived in Hampshire in 1958, opening a factory at Milbrook in Southampton in 1966, which later moved. The previous headquarters was at 389 Chiswick High Road. It was decided to move in June 1970.

IBM sold the main building in 2005. In November 2015 IBM sold two more buildings. In October 2024 IBM left the North Harbour site and moved its Headquarters to IBM Hursley.

=== Construction ===
The site was chosen in 1969, and drained during 1971 under direction of Grontmij N.V. of the Netherlands. 450 acres of land were reclaimed.

In 1972 construction of the lake took place, directly bounded to the south by the construction of the M27 embankment. The foundations were built in 1973, with 30 m-deep piles. The building was formed with pre-cast concrete sections, built on the piles.

Structural engineering and architecture was by Arup Associates. It was built by Taylor Woodrow Construction. It cost £17.2m.

=== Opening ===
Prince Philip, Duke of Edinburgh opened the site on Friday 3 December 1976. The Prince had flown by aircraft, being met by William Harris, 6th Earl of Malmesbury, the Lord Lieutenant of Hampshire.

IBM also had ten acres at Interchange Park, a nearby manufacturing plant, which opened in 1967.

The local NatWest branch was upgraded to have more foreign transaction capabilities. Baltic House in Portsmouth, at the end of the motorway, was taken over in 1978.

=== Visits ===
- Prince Philip attended a dinner at the site at 5pm on Friday 10 April 1992, representing the National Playing Fields Association

== Structure ==
The site is accessed via the A27, at the terminus of M27. Cosham railway station is within walking distance, to the east. It is next to junction 12 of the M27.

A Porsche retail centre opened nearby in 2012, on the site. In 2012 three acres near Porsche were sold for a 124-bed hotel, occupied by Village Hotel Club

=== Tenants ===
- Checkatrade
- Southern Co-operative

=== IBM UK ===
In early the 1990s, IBM employed 14,000 people in the UK

Chief executives of IBM UK are

- 1986 Sir Tony Cleaver
- 1992 Nick Temple
- 1997 Khalil Barsoum (Canadian)
- 2000 Kevin Loosemore
- June 2001 Larry Hirst
- April 2008 Brendon Riley (Australian)
- January 2010 Stephen Leonard
- 2012 David Stokes (Australian)
- May 2017 Bill Kelleher
- January 2023 Nicola Hodson (born 17 December 1966)

== Popular culture ==
- It featured in the 1985 Doctor Who story Revelation of the Daleks, filmed on 9 January 1985

== See also ==
- Business in Hampshire
- Mountbatten House, a listed building in north Hampshire, the former headquarters of Wiggins Teape, bought by IBM in 1987
- Solent Business Park
