= Southern Co-operative =

English consumer co-operative

The Southern Co-operative Limited

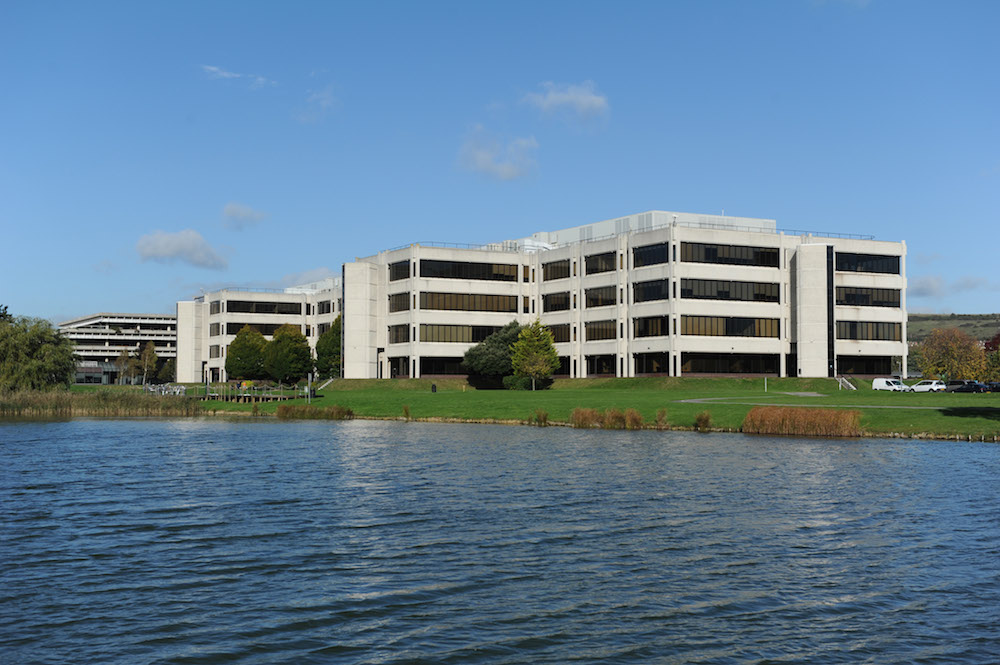
- Southern Co-op's headquarters at the 1000 Lakeside office complex, Portsmouth
- Formerly: Portsea Island Mutual Co-operative Society Limited (1873–1998); Southern Co-operatives Limited (1998–2013)
- Type: Consumer Co-operative
- Industry: Retail
- Founded: 24 March 1873; 153 years ago
- Defunct: July 26, 2026
- Headquarters: 1000 Lakeside North Harbour, Western Road, Portsmouth, Hampshire PO6 3FE
- Area served: Hampshire, the Isle of Wight, Sussex, Berkshire, Somerset, Surrey, Devon, Bristol, Kent and parts of Dorset and Wiltshire.
- Key people: Ben Stimson, Chief Executive
- Products: Grocer, Funeral director, Foodservice
- Revenue: ▼£531.4 million (25/26)
- Operating income: ▼ -£38.7 million (25/26)
- Net income: ▼ -£35,1 million (25/26)
- Members: ▲313,703 (25/26)
- Number of employees: ▼4,507 (25/26)
- Website: southern.coop

The Southern Co-operative Limited, trading as Southern Co-op, was a regional consumer co-operative in the United Kingdom. The principal activities of the Society are food retailing, funeral homes, and cafes. It operates more than 170 convenience stores, funeral homes, and Starbucks coffee shops across the southern English counties of Berkshire, Bristol, Buckinghamshire, Cornwall, Devon, Dorset, Hampshire, Isle of Wight, Kent, London, Somerset, Surrey, Sussex, and Wiltshire. Southern Co-op Society is owned by over 340,000 members who share in the business's profits and democratically control its operations. It was previously registered as an Industrial and Provident Society, but its status is now as a mutual society under the Co-operative and Community Benefit Societies Act 2014.

The business of Southern Co-op includes burial grounds in West Sussex, Dorset, and Cheshire, and a crematorium in Hampshire and Devon. Additionally, Southern Co-op supports franchisee stores that are members of Southern's Welcome convenience brand.

== History ==
Portsea Island Mutual Co-operative Society was formed on 24 March 1873 by dockyard workers who had transferred from Woolwich docks in east London to the Portsmouth dockyard. The workers had previously set up a successful Co-operative Society in Woolwich. When they arrived in Portsmouth, they decided to replicate a similar set-up there.

In December 1872, 30 people attended a public meeting and unanimously agreed to pay one shilling (12 old pence) for the establishment of a local Co-operative. The Society's first shop opened in Charles Street on 9 May 1873.

The head office was previously located at Fareham in Hampshire until July 2011, when it moved to 1000 Lakeside, a business park in North Harbour, Portsmouth.

In April 2026, it was announced by the boards of Southern Co-operative and The Co-operative Group that the two societies intended to merge; on 21 May 2026, members voted in favour.

Southern co-op has debts of an estimated £20 million - Financial report has now been released.

https://southern.coop/who-we-are/annual-review-2025-26

== Operations ==
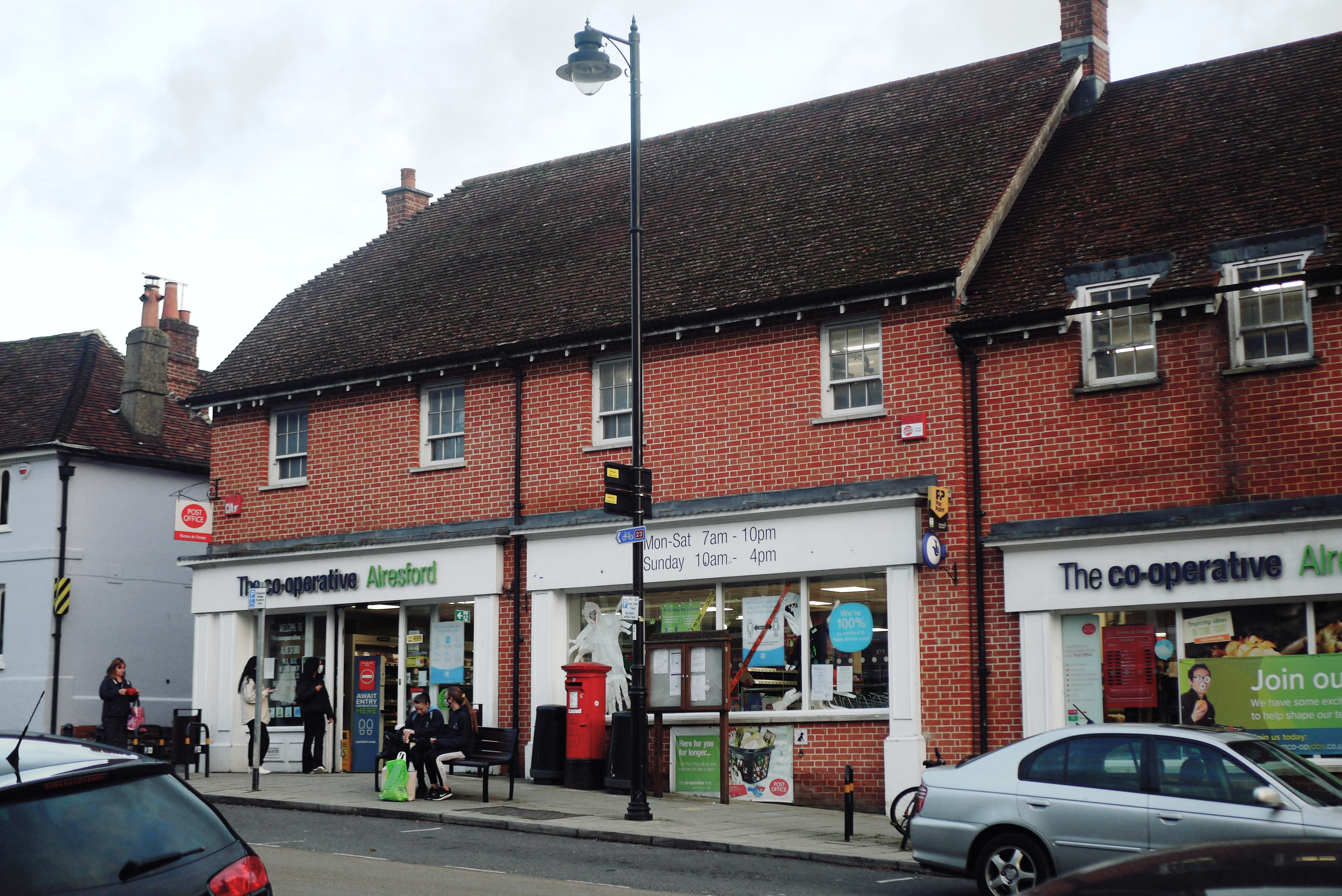
Southern Co-operative branch in New Alresford, Hampshire in 2020.

As of the 26 July 2026 Southern Co-op ceased trading as a legal entity, after 153 years of trading.

As the merger was approved by its members to join Co-op Group, the Southern Co-op was transferred into Siena Co-operative Limited, a subsidiary of Co-op Group. While the Competition and Markets Authority (CMA) process is ongoing, the entity continues to trade as Southern Co-op in name only.

At the time of the merger, Southern Co-op had the following:

- 173 food stores
- 83 Starbucks coffeehouses
- 69 funeral homes
- 3 crematoria
- 4 burial grounds
- 77 Welcome franchise stores
- 330,000 members

== See also ==
- British co-operative movement
- Credit unions in the United Kingdom
