= Public image of Yulia Tymoshenko =

Image of Ukrainian politician

Yulia Tymoshenko, Ukraine's first female prime minister, who spent two terms on that post in 2005 and 2007–2010, is known as a voluble public performer, whose fiery rhetoric has made her an icon of the country's politics. During the Orange Revolution, some Western media publications compared her with Joan of Arc. According to Tamara Hundorova, Tymoshenko's owes much of her success to her gender image, which broke the previously accepted convention in Ukrainian politics by underlining her specifically feminine qualities as opposed to the male-dominated political establishment.

== Public persona ==
=== Visual appearance ===
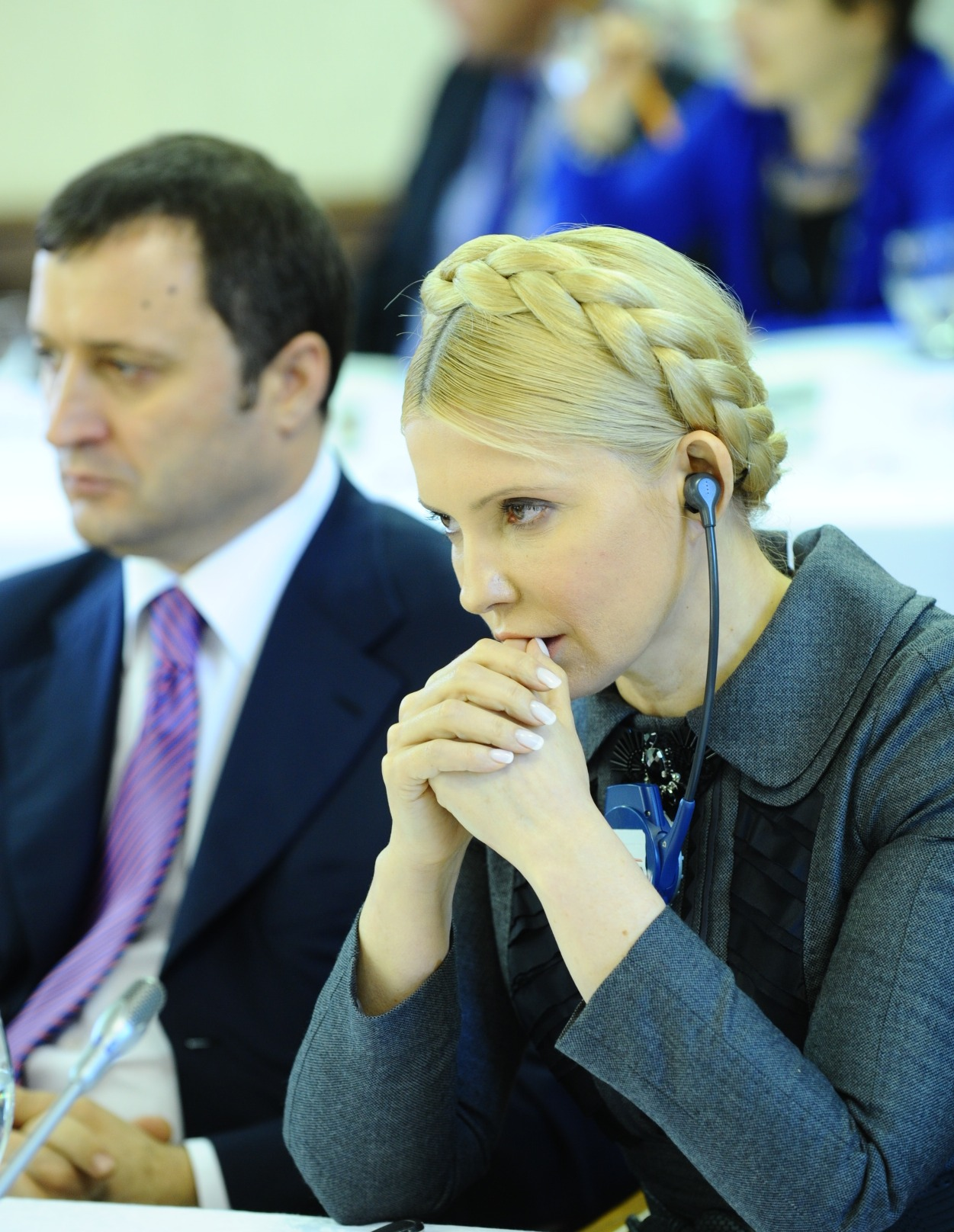
Tymoshenko wearing her trademark hairstyle at the 2011 European People's Party summit

Tymoshenko's notorious braid, which, according to one of her political consultants, had been inspired by the hairstyle of Ukrainian poetess Lesya Ukrainka, gave her the looks of a "simple village teacher" close to the common folk, and her use of white colour and a pointedly feminine silhouette brought associations with popular figures such as Barbie, Snow White and Madonna, hinting at her supposed purity. Tymoshenko herself has repeatedly underlined her authenticity as a woman and claimed to refrain the from use of nail extensions, wigs and makeup in favour of natural looks. According to Korrespondent.net, "probably no supermodel or Hollywood actress has yet learned to produce such a great furore by changing her hairstyle like Ukraine's prime minister".

In what can be seen as sexualization of politics, Tymoshenko resorted to appearing in photoshoots, posing for Elle magazine, and in June 2005 the Polish edition of Playboy named her "person of the month" and published her photo with the trademark braid. Gender scholar Oksana Kis described Tymoshenko's strategy as "imitation of femininity" with the aim of achieving success in the field of politics, which had traditionally been unaccessible to women. This can be seen as part of emancipationist trends in post-Soviet Ukraine, where women have achieved more prominence in business, politics and science, and traditional gender characteristics eroded. In these circumstances Tymoshenko's image served to normalize the participation of women in Ukrainian politics. In some newspapers and television programs, Tymoshenko has been referred to as Lady Yu (Ukrainian: Ледi Ю, Russian: Леди Ю).

=== Allegations of criminal ties and corruption ===
Tymoshenko's critics have suggested that, as an oligarch, she gained her fortune improperly. Her former business partner, former Ukrainian prime minister Pavlo Lazarenko, was convicted in the United States on charges of money laundering, corruption and fraud, the magnitude of which was in the billions of dollars. However, on 7 May 2004, Judge Martin Jenkins of the US District Court for the Northern District of California dismissed the allegations of Tymoshenko's involvement in Lazarenko's murky business. Her transition from oligarch to reformer was believed by many voters to be both genuine and effective. Discrepancies between her declared income and her luxurious designer outfits, have been pointed out in the Ukrainian tabloids.

=== Language question ===
When Tymoshenko joined the Yushchenko government, she did not speak Ukrainian. According to fellow Ukrainian politician Borys Tarasyuk, in 2002 Tymoshenko "only spoke Russian even when I spoke to her in Ukrainian", but since then she has made the transition to speaking only Ukrainian.

=== Opinions of fellow politicians ===
Russian prime minister Vladimir Putin has stated (in November 2009) he found it comfortable to work with his (then) Ukrainian counterpart Yulia Tymoshenko and also praised her for strengthening Ukrainian sovereignty and building stable ties with Moscow and called the second Tymoshenko Government "efficient and a force for stability". It has been suggested by Reuters that the Russian government, after seeing her opposition to Viktor Yushchenko, supported her since late 2008, although Putin denied it.

Former ally and President of Ukraine Yushchenko stated in November 2009, "I am sure that every week spent by Yulia Tymoshenko in the post of prime minister leads the country to a catastrophe. Because of Yulia Tymoshenko, it is a crisis, a crisis in everything". Yushchenko has repeatedly accused his former ally turned rival Tymoshenko of acting in the interests of Russia, although she firmly denied the allegations. On 31 May 2010, Yushchenko stated that Tymoshenko was his "worst mistake", "The most serious mistake was to give the power to her twice". Expert in Ukrainian politics Dr. Taras Kuzio believes that he has always prioritized personal revenge against Tymoshenko over Ukraine's national interests. In her turn, Tymoshenko has blamed President Viktor Yushchenko for obstructing the government-proposed anti-crisis measures and efforts to form a broad coalition to battle the crisis. "The president is using flashy words today to deprive the nation, first of all its government, of the opportunity to counter the crisis, and to leave the nation without a government it logically needs" she said. "Viktor Yushchenko has no right to any criticism. He is the incumbent president. He only has the right to work and to serve Ukraine. He will have the right to criticize when he joins the opposition. Now he must work and answer for his moves".

Former Ukrainian Minister of Finance of Ukraine Viktor Pynzenyk has called Tymoshenko's decisions "normally guided by 'adventurous populism'", which she saw as a tool to "consolidate power in her own hands" and believed Tymoshenko should have "taken advantage of the opportunity presented by the 2008–2009 Ukrainian financial crisis to reform".

Party of Regions Deputy Head Borys Kolesnykov stated on 11 February 2010, "Tymoshenko was the most effective politician during the entire period of Ukraine's recent history". Former European High Representative for Common Foreign and Security Policy Javier Solana has called Tymoshenko "a patriot regardless of the position in which you have found yourself". Yanukovych stated about Tymoshenko on 13 May 2010, "She likes to create a sensation. We have grown used to this extravagant woman".

== Public opinion ==
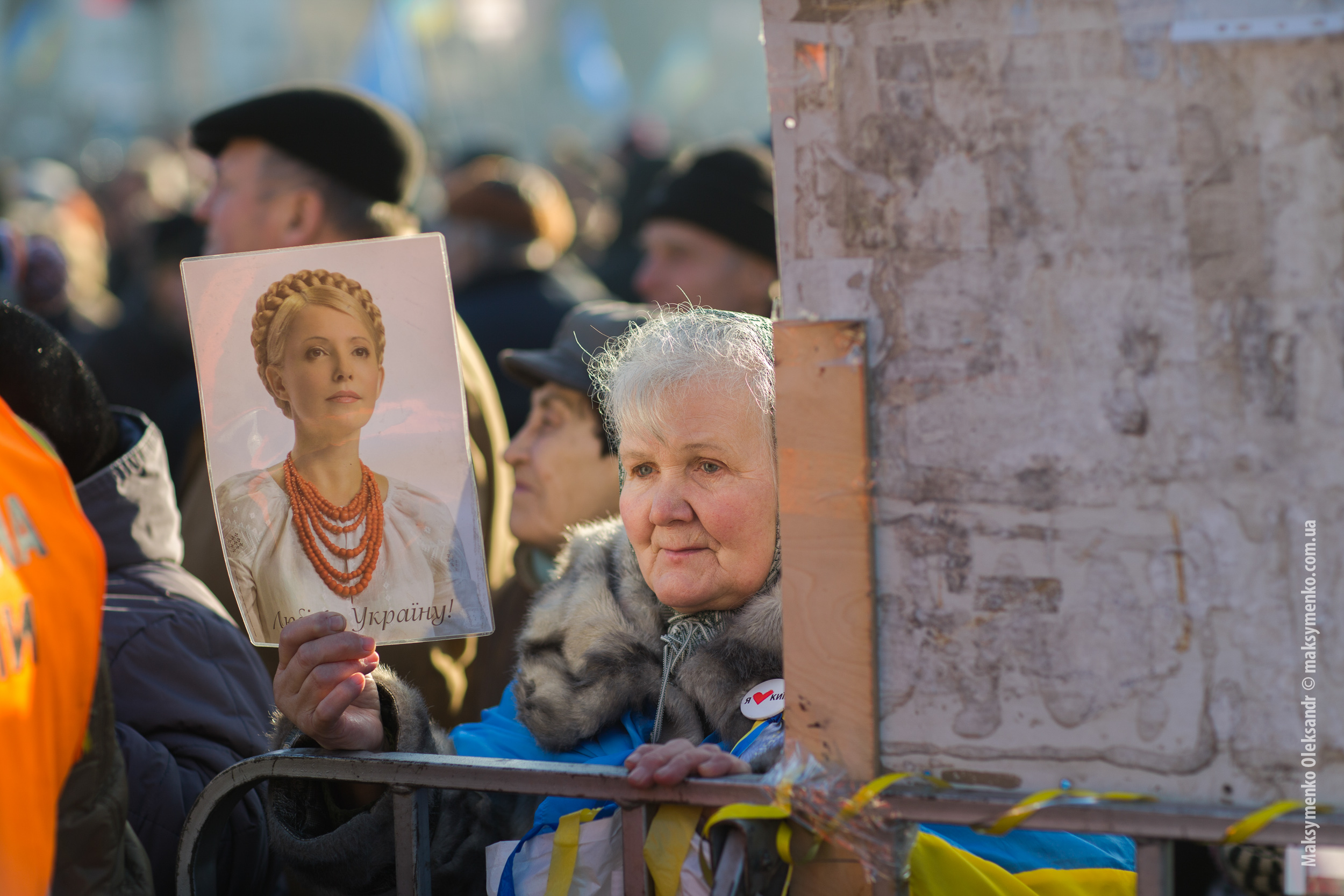
A supporter of Tymoshenko at the Euromaidan protests in 2013

=== Polls ===
During her second stint as prime-minister her ratings in opinion polls fell. In early 2008, in opinion polls for the 2009 Ukrainian presidential election, she stood at 30% but by late April 2009 that had shrunk to 15% According to a poll carried out between 29 January and 5 February 2009 by the Kyiv International Institute of Sociology, just over 43% of the Ukrainian voters believed Tymoshenko should leave her post, whereas just over 45% believed she should stay. According to an opinion poll carried out between 3 and 12 February 2009 by the "Sofia" Center for Social Studies, some 59.1% of those polled believed that the activities of (then) Prime Minister Yulia Tymoshenko were aimed at the defense of her own interests and that of her entourage, some 4.2% said her activities were aimed at the defense of interests of foreign states, and some 23.9% believed that Tymoshenko worked for the sake of national interests. 77.7% of the respondents were unsatisfied with the economic policy of the second Tymoshenko Government. Some 71.8% believed that this government was not able to lead the Ukrainian economy out of the 2008–2009 Ukrainian financial crisis or even change the situation in Ukraine to better; 18.1% of respondents did think that the government could do that. Despite the neck-to-neck 2010 presidential race, many experts believed that Tymoshenko would win the vote due to her ability to "hike her popularity just before the voting day". JP Morgan Securities Inc. experts said that Tymoshenko's victory in presidential election would "bring stability in 2010, with budget consolidation, better terms of crediting and higher influx of capital. As a result, the economy will have better prospects of growing in the second half of 2010 and 2011".

=== Rankings ===
==== International ====
Tymoshenko has been ranked three times by Forbes magazine among the most powerful women in the world. During her first term in 2005, she was ranked third (behind Condoleezza Rice and Wu Yi), in 2008 she was number 17 and in 2009 at number 47.

==== Domestic ====
In 2004, Korrespondent magazine named Yulia Tymoshenko "Revolutionary of the Year".

In 2006 Korrespondent magazine ranked Tymoshenko as its 2005 "Personality of the Year", naming her in the TOP 100 most influential politicians of Ukraine, 2nd place (Women with nimbus), Person of the year.

2007 Yulia Tymoshenko, Focus magazine, the most influential women of Ukraine, 1st place. Yulia Tymoshenko, Korrespondent magazine, TOP 100 the most influential politics of Ukraine, 4th place (Woman-brand), Person of the year. Yulia Tymoshenko, Focus magazine, 200 the most influential Ukrainians, 2nd place.

2009 Yulia Tymoshenko, Korrespondent magazine, TOP 100 the most influential Ukrainians, 1st place (Dream women). Yulia Tymoshenko, Focus magazine, the most influential women of Ukraine, 1st place. Yulia Tymoshenko, Focus magazine, TOP 200 the most influential politicians of Ukraine, 1st place.

According to the Ukrainian magazine Focus, Tymoshenko placed first in an annual ranking of the most influential women in Ukraine in 2006–2010 (five years).

Between 2007 and 2013 in Ukraine, Tymoshenko was the most popular politician on the Internet, in blogs and social networks. As of 2010, Yulia Tymoshenko was the most popular foreign politician in the Russian media.

In 2012 the national rating (28 December 2012) by the Razumkov Center and the "Foundation for Democratic Initiatives" recognised Yulia Tymoshenko as the best prime minister of Ukraine – 19.5%, compared with Viktor Yanukovych – 11.4%, Mykola Azarov – 8.6%, Leonid Kuchma – 5.6%, Viktor Yushchenko – 3.9%, Pavlo Lazarenko – 2.2%.

According to the sociological group "Rating" Yulia Tymoshenko was ranked as third most trusted politician in early April 2021, behind President Volodymyr Zelenskyy and then-Chairman of the Verkhovna Rada Dmytro Razumkov.

Since 2022, Tymoshenko's trust ratings have declined sharply. In May 2025, a KIIS poll showed Tymoshenko had the second-highest net distrust rating (14% trust, 80% distrust) among Ukrainian politician, second to Oleksii Arestovych. A July 2025 survey by "Rating" ranked her as public figure with the highest net distrust (14% trust, 83% distrust).

== In popular culture ==
=== Documentaries ===
- 2009 — Julia by the American film studio Coppola Productions.
- 2011 — documentary (25 minutes) shown to delegates to the NATO Parliamentary Assembly, 8 October 2011.

=== Plays ===
- "Yulia Tymoshenko", a play by Adriana Altaras and Maksim Kurochkin in the Hans Otto Theater in Potsdam, Germany. (September 2006)
- The play "Who Wants to Kill Yulia Tymoshenko?", first performed at the opening night of the 2013 Edinburgh Festival Fringe, portrayed the political fight of Yulia Tymoshenko and her imprisonment. (August 2013)
- The play "Ride the Cyclone" mentioned Tymoshenko in passing during Mischa Bachinski's Talia monologue

=== Publications ===
- On 4 October 2014 in Milan, Italy, Yulia Tymoshenko's daughter Eugenia Tymoshenko presented the book "Ukraine, Gas and Handcuffs: The Trial of Yulia Tymoshenko" (Italian: «Ucraina, gas e manette: il processo a Yulia Tymoshenko»). The title, "Ukraine, Gas and Handcuffs: The Trial of Yulia Tymoshenko", demonstrates a clear understanding that energy is the key source of Ukraine's dependence. The author, Matteo Cazzulani, draws a clear parallel between Ukraine and the fate of Yulia Tymoshenko, denied her freedom because of her fight against corruption, the oligarchy and the dependence of the Ukrainian energy-sector on Russian energy.
