= Purewal =

Purewal or Pureval is an Indian surname. Notable people with the surname include:

- Aftab Pureval (born 1982), American politician
- Garry Purewal, Canadian politician
- Harpal Singh Purewal, English footballer
- Pal Singh Purewal (1931/32–2022), Canadian engineer
- Tarsem Singh Purewal (1934–1995), Indian journalist

== See also ==
- Pure (disambiguation)
- Wal (disambiguation)
- Purewell
