= Unclean =

Unclean may refer to:

- Unclean animals, those whose consumption or handling is labeled a taboo
- Unclean food, in Jewish dietary custom
- Ritually impure, in various religions
- Unclean hands, a term in contract law
- Unclean (album), a 1998 album by Rorschach Test
- "Unclean" (song), from 1984
- Unclean spirit, in Christianity
- Unclean vocals, a term for the harsh vocals in metal or punk music

== See also ==
- Clean and Unclean (disambiguation)
- Impurity (disambiguation)
- Aśuddhatā, in Hindu religion
- Dirty
- Menstrual taboo
