= Impurity (disambiguation) =

An impurity is a substance inside a confined amount of liquid, gas, or solid, which differs from the chemical composition of the material or compound.

Impurity may also refer to:

- Impurity (Fleshcrawl album), 1994
- Impurity (New Model Army album), 1990
- Gini impurity, in decision tree learning
- "Impurities," a song by Le Sserafim from Antifragile (EP), 2022

== See also ==
- Purity
- Ritual impurity
- Aśuddhatā, in Hindu religion
- Dirty
- Unclean (disambiguation)
- Vice
