= Hampshire =

County of England

- Non-metropolitan and ceremonial county
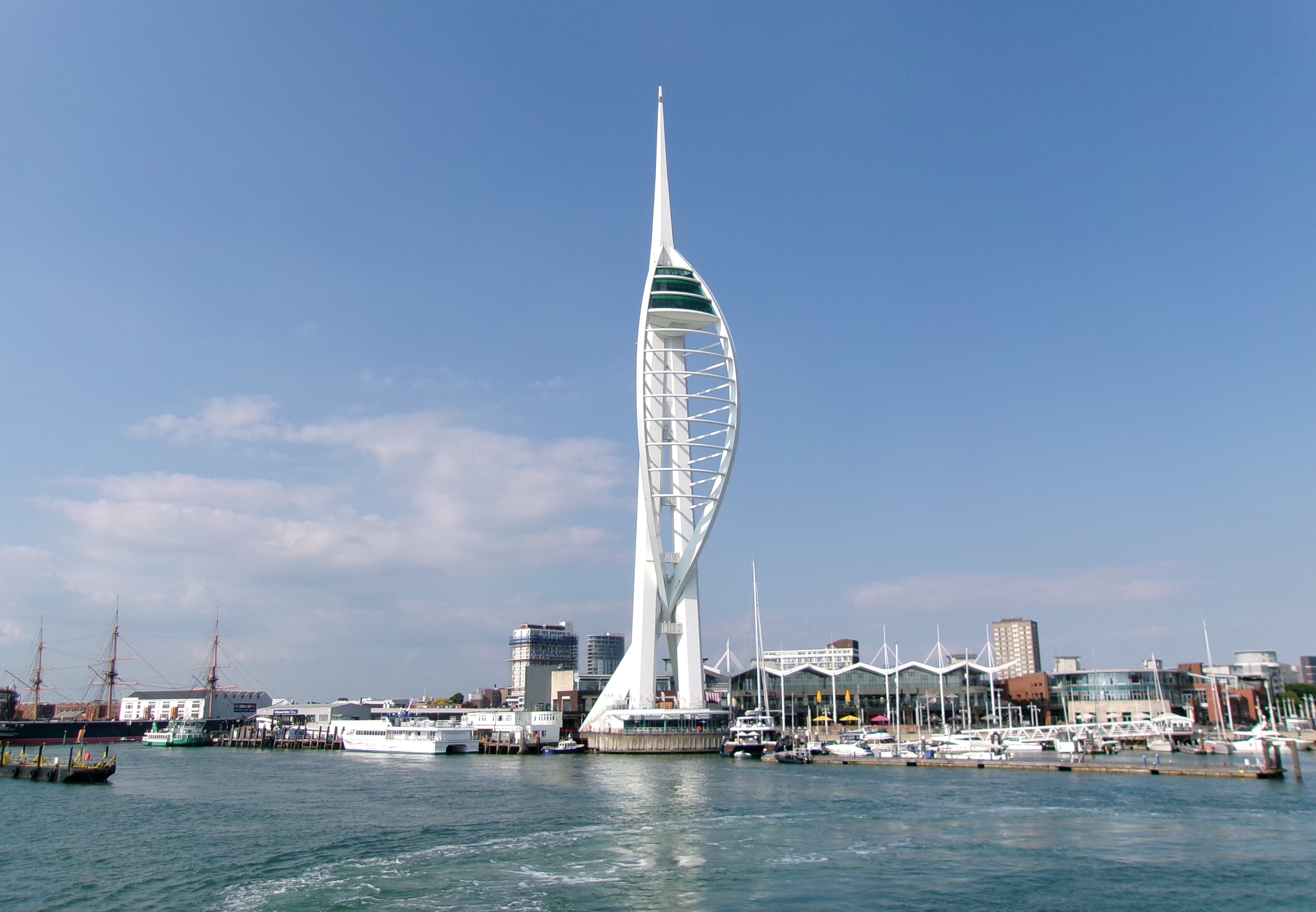
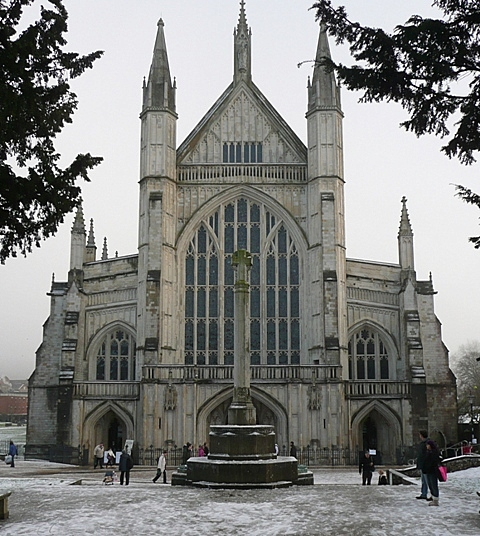
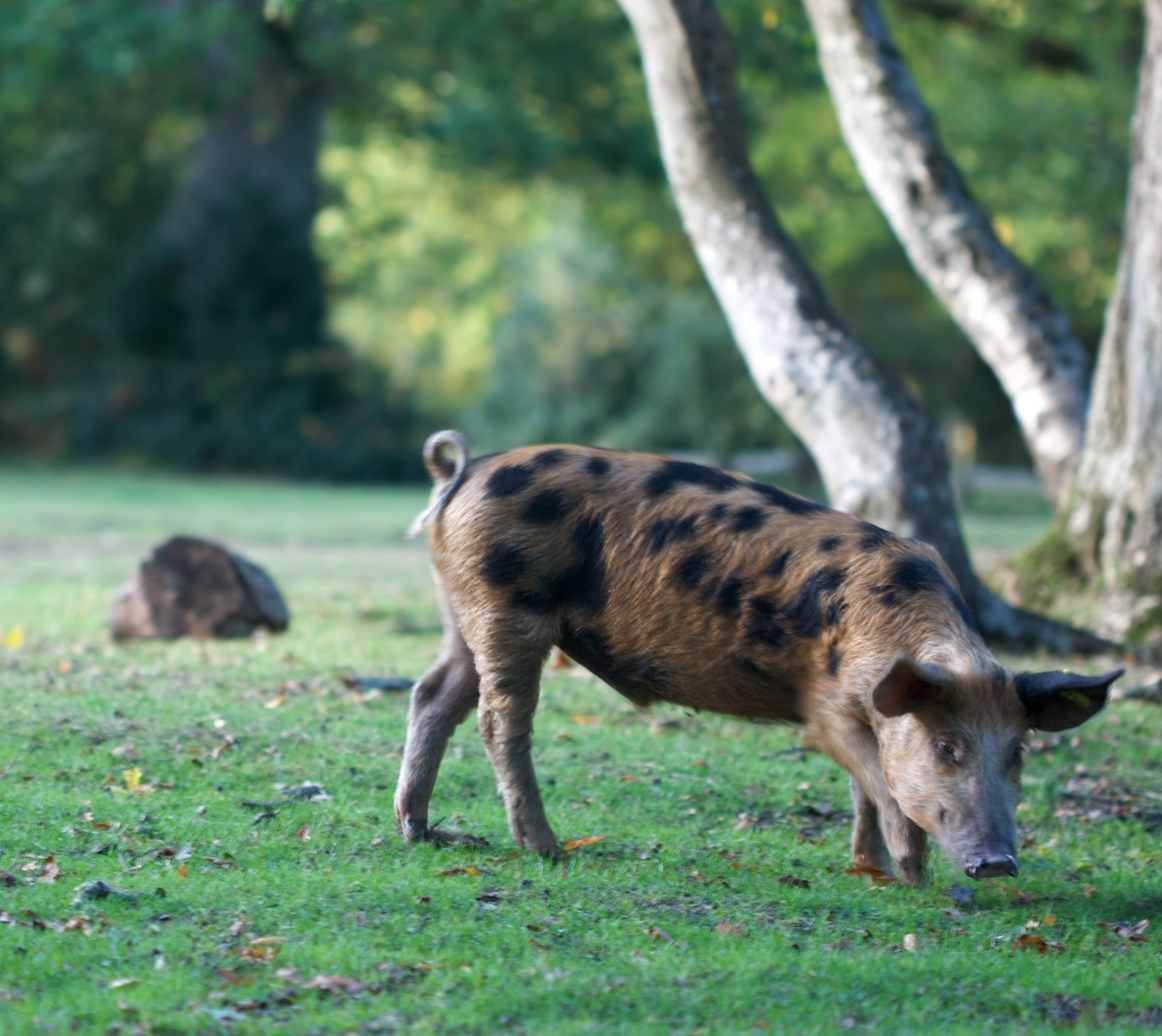
- Spinnaker Tower and Portsmouth Harbour (top), Winchester Cathedral (bottom left), and pannage in the New Forest (bottom right)

- Ceremonial Hampshire within England Historic Hampshire in England
- Coordinates: 51°03′27″N 1°18′27″W
- Sovereign state: United Kingdom
- Constituent country: England
- Region: South East
- Established: Ancient
- Time zone: UTC+0 (GMT)
  - Summer (DST): UTC+1 (BST)
- UK Parliament: List of MPs
- Police: Hampshire and Isle of Wight Constabulary
- Ceremonial county
- Lord Lieutenant: Nigel Atkinson
- High Sheriff: William John Maltby
- Area: 3,769 km^{2} (1,455 sq mi)
  - Rank: 9th of 48
- Population (2024): 1,920,959
  - Rank: 7th of 48
  - Density: 510/km^{2} (1,300/sq mi)
- Non-metropolitan county
- County council: Hampshire County Council
- Control: No overall control
- Admin HQ: Winchester
- Area: 3,678 km^{2} (1,420 sq mi)
  - Rank: 5th of 21
- Population (2025): 1,451,703
  - Rank: 3rd of 21
  - Density: 395/km^{2} (1,020/sq mi)
- ISO 3166-2: GB-HAM
- GSS code: E10000014
- ITL: UKJ33
- Website: hants.gov.uk
- Unitary authorities
- Councils: Southampton; Portsmouth
- Districts
- Districts of Hampshire; Unitary County council area
- Districts: List: Test Valley; Basingstoke and Deane; Hart; Rushmoor; Winchester; East Hampshire; New Forest; Southampton; Eastleigh; Fareham; Gosport; Portsmouth; Havant

Hampshire (/ˈhæmpʃər/, /-ʃɪər/; abbreviated to Hants.) (Note: Archaically known as the County of Southampton, and less commonly as Southamptonshire) is a ceremonial county in South East England. It is bordered by Berkshire to the north, Surrey and West Sussex to the east, the Solent to the south, Dorset to the west, and Wiltshire to the north-west. The city of Southampton is the largest settlement.

The county has an area of 3,769 km^{2} (1,455 sq mi) and had an estimated population of 1,920,959 in 2024. Southampton is in the south of the county and the city of Portsmouth in the south-east; both are part of a larger conurbation. A second conurbation in the north-east includes Farnborough and Aldershot and extends into Berkshire and Surrey. The remainder of the county is rural, and its principal settlements include Basingstoke in the north, Andover in the north-west, and the city of Winchester in the centre. For local government purposes Hampshire comprises a non-metropolitan county, with eleven districts, and two unitary authority areas: Portsmouth and Southampton. The county historically contained the towns of Bournemouth and Christchurch, which are now in Dorset, and the Isle of Wight.

Undulating hills characterise much of the county. A belt of chalk crosses the county from north-west, where it forms the Hampshire Downs, to south-east, where it is part of the South Downs. The county's major rivers rise in these hills; the Loddon and Wey drain north, into the Thames, and the Itchen and Test flow south into Southampton Water, a large estuary. In the south-east are Portsmouth Harbour, Langstone Harbour, and the western edge of Chichester Harbour, three large rias. The south-west contains the New Forest, which includes pasture, heath, and forest and is one of the largest expanses of ancient woodland remaining in England.

Settled about 14,000 years ago, Hampshire's recorded history dates to Roman Britain, when its chief town was Venta Belgarum (now Winchester). The county was recorded in Domesday Book as divided into 44 hundreds. From the 12th century, the ports settlements grew due to increasing trade with the European mainland resulting from the wool and cloth, fishing, and shipbuilding industries. This meant by the 16th century, Southampton had become more populous than Winchester. In 20th century conflicts, including World War One and Two, Hampshire played a crucial military role due to its ports.

== Toponymy ==
The Saxon settlement at Southampton was known as Hamtun, while the surrounding area or scīr was called Hamtunscīr. The old name was recorded in the Domesday Book as Hantescire, and it is from this spelling that the modern abbreviation "Hants" derives. From 1889 until 1959, the administrative county was named the County of Southampton. It has also been called Southamptonshire.

Hampshire was a departure point for several groups of colonists who left England to settle on the east coast of North America during the 17th century, and many inhabitants of Hampshire settled there, naming the land New Hampshire in honour of their original homeland.

== History ==
=== Before the Roman Conquest ===
The region is believed to have been continuously occupied since the end of the last Ice Age about 12,000 BCE. At that time sea levels were lower and Britain was still attached by a land bridge to the European continent and predominantly covered with deciduous woodland. The first inhabitants were Mesolithic hunter-gatherers. The majority of the population would have been concentrated around the river valleys. Over several thousand years the climate became progressively warmer and sea levels rose; the English Channel, which started out as a river, was a major inlet by 8000 BCE, although Britain was still connected to Europe by a land bridge across the North Sea until 6500 BCE. Notable sites from this period include Bouldnor Cliff.

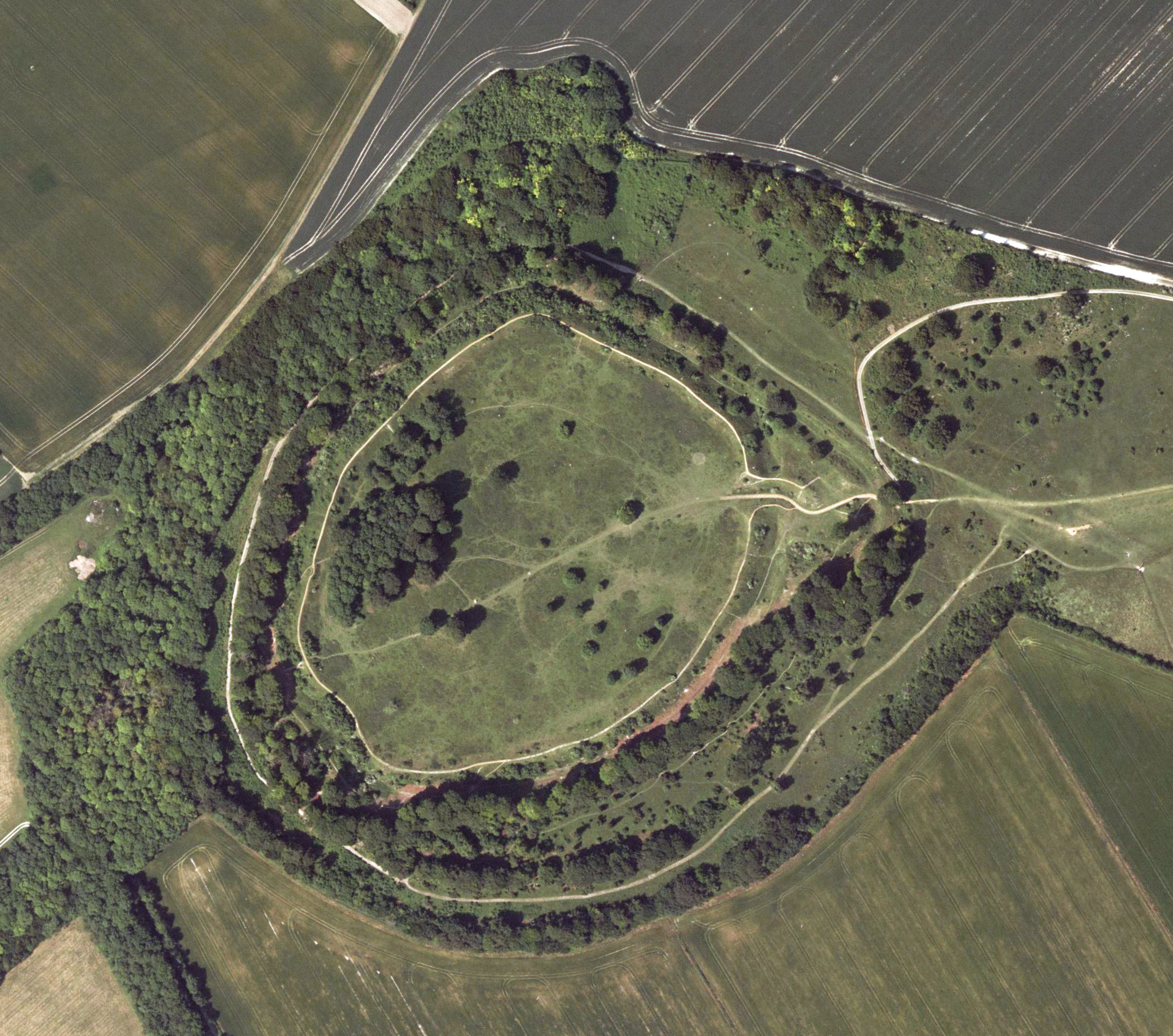
Danebury Fort – aerial image

Agriculture was being practised in southern Britain by 4000 BCE and with it a Neolithic culture. Some deforestation took place at that time, although during the Bronze Age, beginning in 2200 BCE, it became more widespread and systematic. Hampshire has few monuments to show from those early periods, although nearby Stonehenge was built in several phases at some time between 3100 and 2200 BCE. In the very late Bronze Age fortified hilltop settlements known as hillforts began to appear in large numbers in many parts of Britain including Hampshire, and they became more and more important in the early and middle Iron Age; many of them are still visible in the landscape today and can be visited, notably Danebury Rings, the subject of a major study by archaeologist Barry Cunliffe. By that period the people of Britain predominantly spoke a Celtic language, and their culture shared much in common with the Celts described by classical writers. The town of Bitterne (Byterne in a reference from the late 11th century.) shares the same root as the River Erne, suggesting the name refers to the Iverni.

Hillforts largely declined in importance in the second half of the second century BCE, with many being abandoned. Probably around that period the first recorded invasion of Britain took place, as southern Britain was largely conquered by warrior-elites from Belgic tribes of northeastern Gaul, but whether those two events were linked to the decline of hillforts is unknown. By the time of the Roman conquest the oppidum at Venta Belgarum, modern-day Winchester, was the de facto regional administrative centre; Winchester was, however, of secondary importance to the Roman-style town of Calleva Atrebatum, modern Silchester, built further north by a dominant Belgic polity known as the Atrebates in the 50s BCE. Julius Caesar invaded south-eastern England briefly in 55 and again in 54 BCE, but he never reached Hampshire. Notable sites from this period include Hengistbury Head (now in Dorset), which was a major port.

=== The Roman Era ===
The Romans invaded Britain again in 43 CE and Hampshire was incorporated into the Roman province of Britannia very quickly. It is generally believed their political leaders allowed themselves to be incorporated peacefully. Venta became the capital of the administrative polity of the Belgae, which included most of Hampshire and Wiltshire and reached as far as Bath. Whether the people of Hampshire played any role in Boudicca's rebellion of 60–61 is not recorded, but evidence of burning is seen in Winchester dated to around that period. For most of the next three centuries southern Britain enjoyed relative peace. During the later part of the Roman period most towns built defensive walls; a pottery industry based in the New Forest exported items widely across southern Britain. A fortification near Southampton was called Clausentum, part of the Saxon Shore forts, traditionally seen as either defences against maritime raids by Germanic tribes, or as a settlement area of Germanic tribes, which receives support from archaeological finds. Artefacts of a Germanic style have been found in burials, while there is also evidence of the presence of early Saxon settlement in southern England and the northern coasts of Gaul around Boulogne-sur-Mer and Bayeux. This, in turn, could mirror a well documented practice of deliberately settling Germanic tribes to strengthen Roman defences.

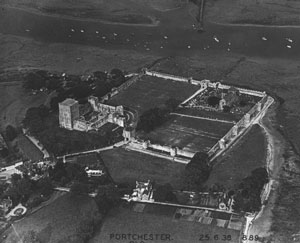
Portchester Castle, June 1938

Portus Adurni was a Roman fort situated at the north end of Portsmouth Harbour. It was part of the Saxon Shore, and is the best-preserved Roman fort north of the Alps. Around an eighth of the fort has been excavated. A Norman keep was added in the Middle Ages, now known as Portchester Castle. The Romans withdrew from Britain in 410.

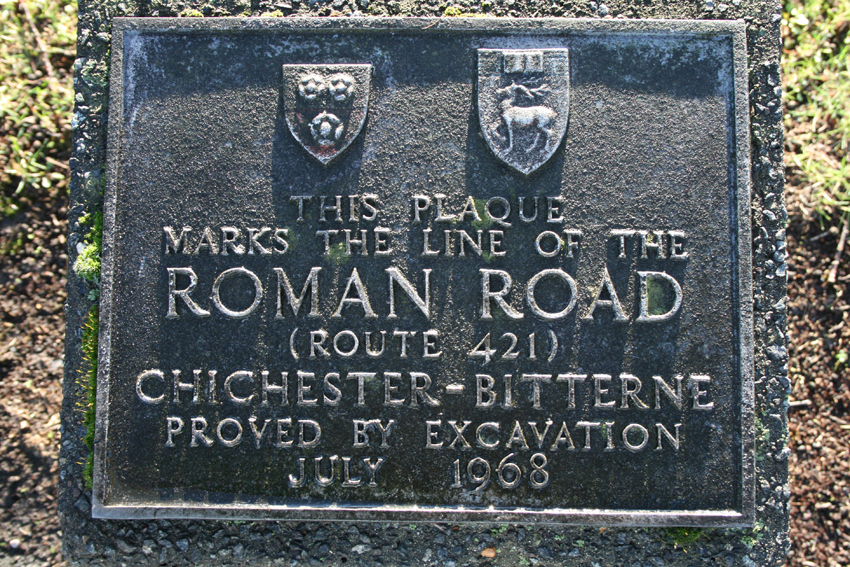
Plaque on Freemantle Common marking the route of the Roman Road from Chichester to Bitterne

Two major Roman roads, Ermin Way and Port Way, cross the north of the county connecting Calleva Atrebatum with Corinium Dobunnorum, modern Cirencester, and Old Sarum respectively. Other roads connected Venta Belgarum with Old Sarum, Wickham and Clausentum. A road presumed to diverge from the Chichester to Silchester Way at Wickham connected Noviomagus Reginorum, modern Chichester, with Clausentum.

=== The Jutes ===
Records are sparse for the next 300 years, but later chroniclers speak of an influx of Jutes – an amalgam of Cimbri, Teutons, Gutones and Charudes called Eudoses, Eotenas, Iutae or Euthiones in other sources - and recorded by Bede in his Ecclesiastical History of the English People in the early eighth century:

Those who came over were of the three most powerful nations of Germany—Saxons, Angles, and Jutes. From the Jutes are descended the people of Kent, and of the Isle of Wight, and those also in the province of the West Saxons who are to this day called Jutes, seated opposite to the Isle of Wight.

— Bede (1910)

They initially settled Hampshire under Visigothic authority sometime after 476 AD, forming several distinct folklands organized around a central geographical feature. Various place-names identify locations as Jutish, including Bishopstoke (Ytingstoc), the River Itchen (Ytene) and the Meon Valley (Ytedene). There in fact appear to be at least two Jutish folklands in Hampshire: one established along the River Itchen and one along the River Meon. Evidence of an early Germanic settlement has been found at Clausentum, dated to the fifth century and likely the Visigothic center of power in the area, either independently or in conjunction with powerful Romano-British trading ports. Nevertheless, Visigothic authority waned after 517 CE and the settlements were gradually encroached upon by South Saxons.

=== The Saxons ===
The West Saxons moved south in the late seventh century and incorporated Hampshire into their kingdom. (Note: Ytene is the genitive plural of Yte meaning "Jute", i.e. "of the Jutes". Florence of Worcester talks about how William Rufus was slain in the New Forest and that in the English tongue (Nova Foresta que lingua Anglorum) the term for the New Forest was Ytene.) Around this period, the administrative region of "Hampshire" seems to appear - the name is attested as Hamwic and "Hamtunscir" in 755 AD - and suggests that control over the Solent was the motivating factor for establishment of the settlement.

Wessex, with its capital at Winchester, gradually expanded westwards into Brythonic Dorset and Somerset. A statue in Winchester celebrates the powerful King Alfred the Great, who repulsed the Vikings and stabilised the region in the 9th century. A scholar as well as a soldier, the Anglo-Saxon Chronicle, a powerful tool in the development of the English identity, was commissioned in his reign. King Alfred proclaimed himself "King of England" in 886 AD; but Athelstan of Wessex did not officially control the whole of England until 927 AD.

=== Middle Ages onwards ===
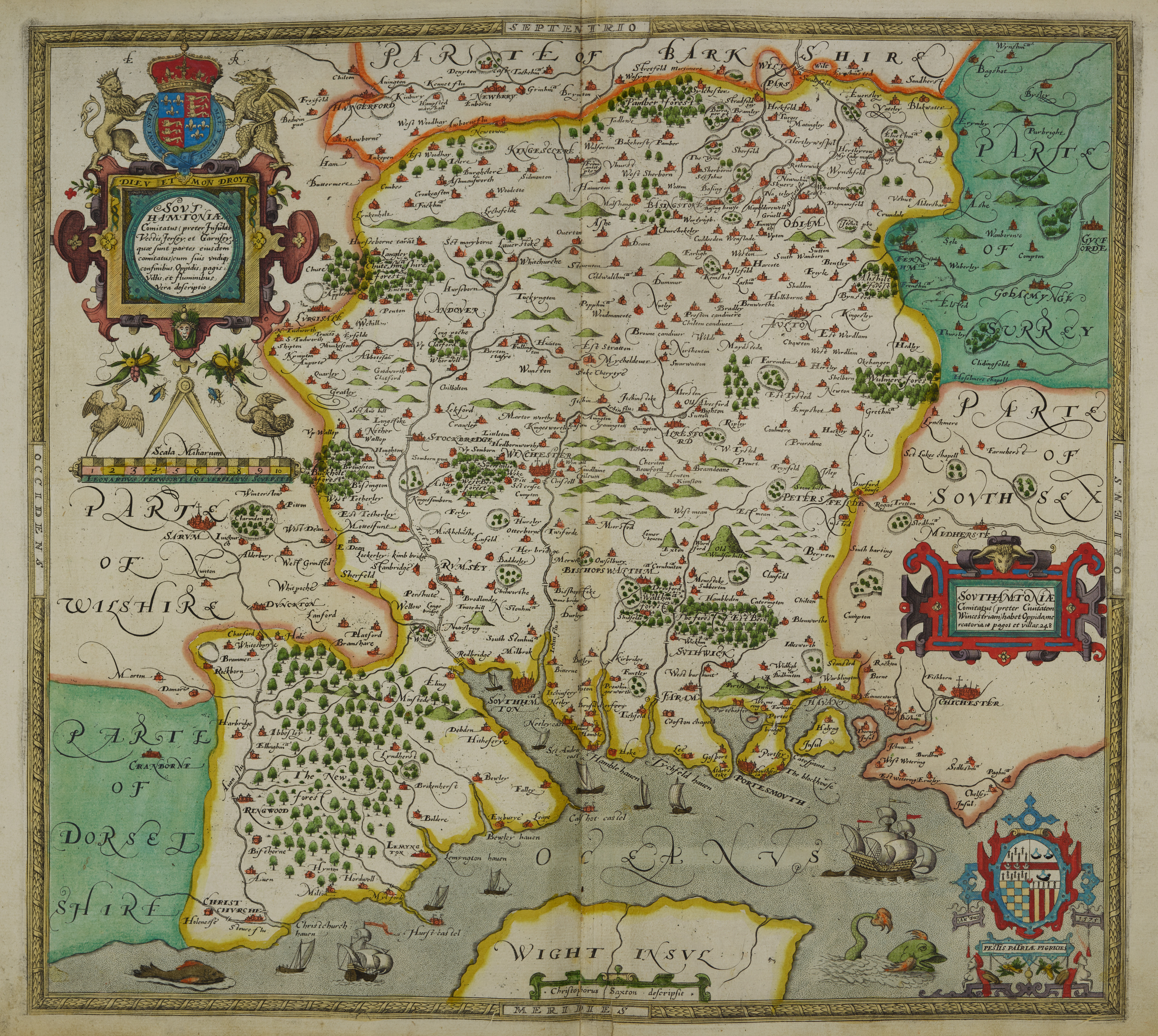
Hand-drawn map of Hampshire by Christopher Saxton from 1577

By the Norman Conquest, London had overtaken Winchester as the largest city in England and after the Norman Conquest, King William I made London his capital. While the centre of political power moved away from Hampshire, Winchester remained an important city; the proximity of the New Forest to Winchester made it a prized royal hunting forest; King William Rufus was killed while hunting there in 1100. There were 44 hundreds, covering 483 named places, recorded in the Domesday Book of 1086 which are in present-day Hampshire and part of Sussex. From the 12th century, the ports grew in importance, fuelled by trade with the continent, wool and cloth manufacture in the county, and the fishing industry, and a shipbuilding industry was established. By 1523 at the latest, the population of Southampton had outstripped that of Winchester.

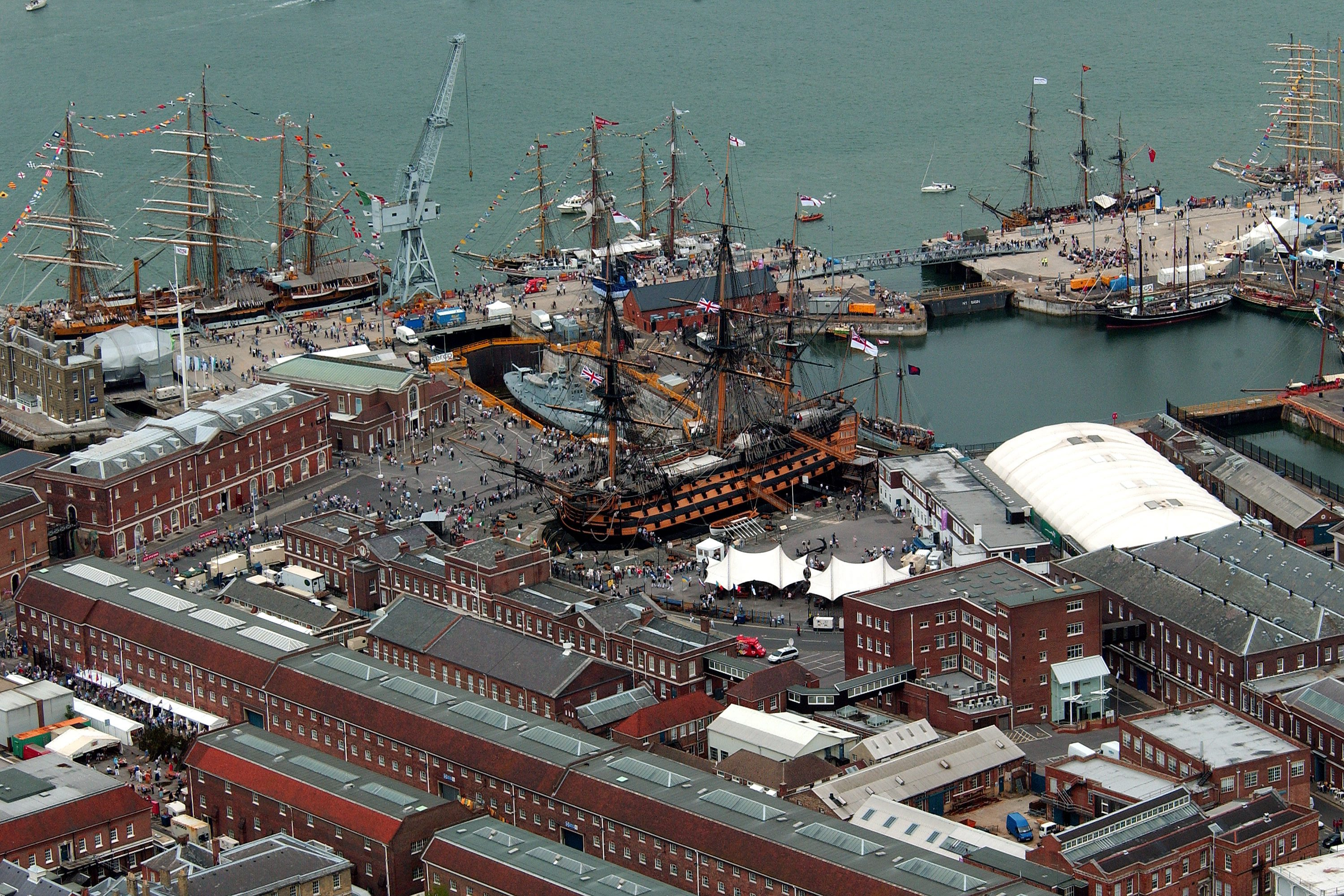
Portsmouth historic dockyard, 2005

Over several centuries, a series of castles and forts was constructed along the coast of the Solent to defend the harbours at Southampton and Portsmouth. These include the Roman Portchester Castle which overlooks Portsmouth Harbour, and a series of forts built by Henry VIII including Hurst Castle, situated on a sand spit at the mouth of the Solent, Calshot Castle on another spit at the mouth of Southampton Water, and Netley Castle. Southampton and Portsmouth remained important harbours when rivals, such as Poole and Bristol, declined, as they are amongst the few locations that combine shelter with deep water. Mayflower and Speedwell set sail for America from Southampton in 1620.

During the English Civil War (1642–1651) there were several skirmishes in Hampshire between the Royalist and Parliamentarian forces. Principal engagements were the Siege of Basing House between 1643 and 1645, and the Battle of Cheriton in 1644; both were significant Parliamentarian victories. Other clashes included the Battle of Alton in 1643, where the commander of the Royalist forces was killed in the pulpit of the parish church, and the Siege of Portsmouth in 1642.

By the mid-19th century, with the county's population at 219,210 (double that at the beginning of the century) in more than 86,000 dwellings, agriculture was the principal industry (10 per cent of the county was still forest) with cereals, peas, hops, honey, sheep and hogs important. Due to Hampshire's long association with pigs and boars, natives of the county have been known as Hampshire hogs since the 18th century. In the eastern part of the county the principal port was Portsmouth (with its naval base, population 95,000), while several ports (including Southampton, with its steam docks, population 47,000) in the western part were significant. In 1868, the number of people employed in manufacture exceeded those in agriculture, engaged in silk, paper, sugar and lace industries, ship building and salt works. Coastal towns engaged in fishing and exporting agricultural produce. Several places were popular for seasonal sea bathing. The ports employed large numbers of workers, both land-based and seagoing; Titanic, lost on her maiden voyage in 1912, was crewed largely by residents of Southampton.

On 16 October 1908, Samuel Franklin Cody made the first powered flight of 400 yd (370 m) in the United Kingdom at Farnborough, then home to the Army Balloon Factory.

=== Modern era ===
Hampshire played a crucial role in both World Wars due to the large Royal Navy naval base at Portsmouth, the army camp at Aldershot, and the military Netley Hospital on Southampton Water, as well as its proximity to the army training ranges on Salisbury Plain and the Isle of Purbeck. Supermarine, the designers of the Spitfire and other military aircraft, were based in Southampton, which led to severe bombing of the city in World War II. Aldershot remains one of the British Army's main permanent camps. Farnborough is a major centre for the aviation industry.

During World War II, the Beaulieu estate of Lord Montagu in the New Forest was the site of several group B finishing schools for agents operated by the Special Operations Executive (SOE) between 1941 and 1945. (One of the trainers was Kim Philby who was later found to be part of a spy ring passing information to the Soviets.) In 2005, a special exhibition was established at the estate, with a video showing photographs from that era as well as voice recordings of former SOE trainers and agents.

Although the Isle of Wight has at times been part of Hampshire, it has been administratively independent for over a century, obtaining a county council of its own in 1890. The Isle of Wight became a full ceremonial county in 1974. Apart from a shared police force, no formal administrative links now exist between the Isle of Wight and Hampshire, though many organisations still combine Hampshire and the Isle of Wight.

In the 1970s, local government reorganisation led to a reduction in Hampshire's size; in 1974, the towns of Bournemouth and Christchurch were transferred to Dorset.

== Geography ==
Hampshire is bordered by Dorset to the west, Wiltshire to the north-west, Berkshire to the north, Surrey to the north-east, and West Sussex to the east. The southern boundary is the coastline of the English Channel and the Solent, facing the Isle of Wight. It is the largest county in South East England and remains the third largest shire county in the United Kingdom despite losing more land than any other English county in all contemporary boundary changes. At its greatest size in 1890, Hampshire was the fifth-largest county in England. It now has an overall area of 3,700 km^{2} (1,400 sq mi), and measures about 86 km (53 mi) east–west and 76 km (47 mi) north–south.

=== Geology ===
Hampshire's geology falls into two categories. The north and centre are the county's downlands: a gently folded succession of sedimentary rocks dating from the Cretaceous and Palaeogene periods. The lower (early) Cretaceous rocks are sandstones and mudstones whilst those of the upper (late) Cretaceous are the various formations that comprise the Chalk Group. Overlying these rocks in some areas are less consolidated Palaeogene clays, sands, gravels and silts of the Lambeth, Thames and Bracklesham Groups.

In the south, along the coast is the "Hampshire Basin", an area of relatively non-resistant Eocene and Oligocene clays and gravels which are protected from sea erosion by the Isle of Purbeck, Dorset, and the Isle of Wight. These low, flat lands support heathland and woodland habitats, a large area of which forms part of the New Forest. The New Forest has a mosaic of heathland, grassland, coniferous and deciduous woodland habitats that host diverse wildlife. The forest is protected as a national park, limiting development and agricultural use to protect the landscape and wildlife. Large areas of the New Forest are open common lands kept as a grassland plagioclimax by grazing animals, including domesticated cattle, pigs and horses, and several wild deer species. Erosion of the weak rock and sea level change flooding the low land has carved several large estuaries and rias, notably the 16 km (9.9 mi) long Southampton Water and the large convoluted Portsmouth Harbour. The Isle of Wight lies off the coast of Hampshire where the non-resistant rock has been eroded away, forming the Solent.

A 2014 study found that Hampshire shares significant reserves of shale oil with other neighbouring counties, totalling 4.4 billion barrels of oil, which then Business and Energy Minister Michael Fallon said "will bring jobs and business opportunities" and significantly help with UK energy self-sufficiency. Fracking in the area is required to achieve these objectives, which has been opposed by environmental groups.

=== Natural regions ===
Natural England identifies a number of national character areas that lie wholly or partially in Hampshire: the Hampshire Downs, New Forest, South Hampshire Lowlands, South Coast Plain, South Downs, Low Weald and Thames Basin Heaths

=== Green belt ===
South West Hampshire and South East Dorset green belt (shown in green)

Hampshire contains all its green belt in the New Forest district, in the southwest of the county, from the boundary with Dorset along the coastline to Lymington and northwards to Ringwood. Its boundary is contiguous with the New Forest National Park. The Hampshire portion was first created in 1958. Its function is to control expansion in the South East Dorset conurbation and outlying towns and villages.

=== Hills ===
The highest point in Hampshire is Pilot Hill at 286 m (938 ft), in the northwest corner of the county, bordering Berkshire, and there are some 20 other hills exceeding 200 m (660 ft). Butser Hill, at 271 m (889 ft), where the A3 crosses the South Downs, is probably the best known. In the north and centre of the county the substrate is the rocks of the Chalk Group, which form the Hampshire Downs and the South Downs. These are high hills with steep slopes where they border the clays to the south. The hills dip steeply forming a scarp onto the Thames valley to the north, and dip gently to the south. The highest village in Hampshire at about 240 m (790 ft) above sea level is Ashmansworth, located between Andover and Newbury.

=== Rivers ===
The Itchen and Test are trout rivers that flow from the chalk through wooded valleys into Southampton Water. Other important watercourses are the Hamble, Meon, Beaulieu and Lymington rivers. The Hampshire Avon, which links Stonehenge to the sea, passes through Fordingbridge and Ringwood and then forms the modern border between Hampshire and Dorset. The northern branch of the River Wey has its source near Alton and flows east past Bentley. The River Loddon rises at West Ham Farm and flows north through Basingstoke.

=== Wildlife ===
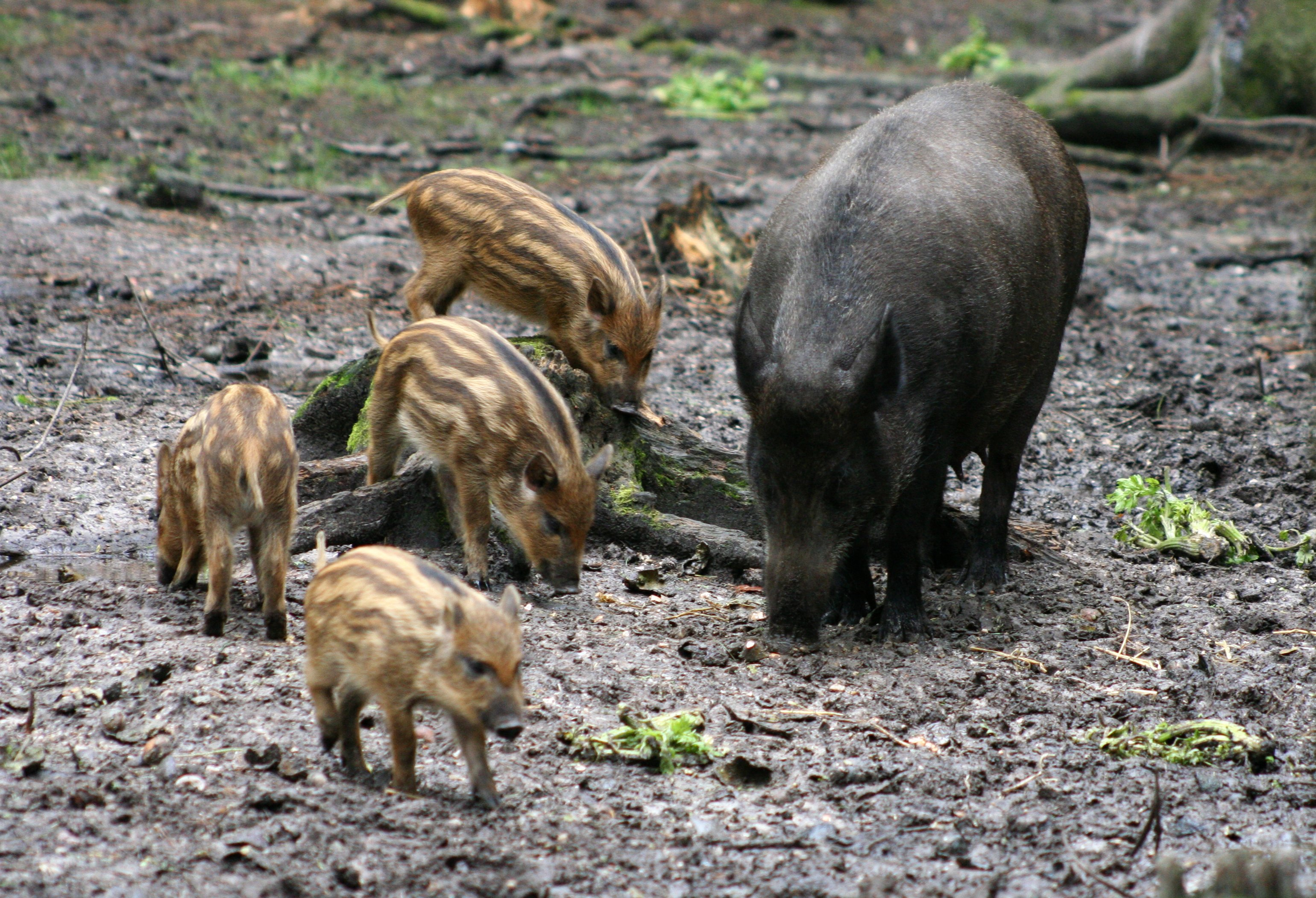
Wild boar at the New Forest Wildlife Park

Hampshire's downland supports a calcareous grassland habitat, important for wild flowers and insects. A large area of the downs is now protected from further agricultural damage by the East Hampshire Area of Outstanding Natural Beauty. The River Test has a growing number of otters as, increasingly, does the Itchen, although other areas of the county have quite low numbers. There are wild boar kept for meat in the New Forest, which is known for its ponies and herds of fallow deer, red deer, roe deer, and sika deer as well as a small number of muntjac deer. The deer had been hunted for some 900 years until 1997. An unwelcome relative newcomer is the mink population, descended from animals that escaped or were deliberately released from fur farms since the 1950s, which cause havoc amongst native wildlife.

Farlington Marshes, 125 ha (310 acres) of flower-rich grazing marsh and saline lagoon at the north end of Langstone Harbour, is a nature reserve and an internationally important overwintering site for wildfowl. In a valley on the downs is Selborne; the countryside surrounding the village was the location of Gilbert White's pioneering observations on natural history. Hampshire's county flower is the Dog Rose.

Hampshire contains two national parks; the New Forest is wholly within the county, and the South Downs National Park embraces parts of Hampshire, West Sussex and East Sussex; they are each overseen by a national park authority.

=== Climate ===
Hampshire has a milder climate than most areas of the British Isles, being in the far south with the climate stabilising effect of the sea, but protected against the more extreme weather of the Atlantic coast. Hampshire has a higher average annual temperature than the UK average at 9.8 to 12 °C (49.6 to 53.6 °F), average rainfall at 640–1,060 mm (25–42 in) per year, and holds higher than average sunshine totals of around 1,750 hours of sunshine per year.

Climate data for Southampton, elevation 3 m, 1981–2010
Month	Jan	Feb	Mar	Apr	May	Jun	Jul	Aug	Sep	Oct	Nov	Dec	Year
Mean daily maximum °C (°F)	8.4 (47.1)	8.6 (47.5)	11.1 (52.0)	14.0 (57.2)	17.5 (63.5)	20.2 (68.4)	22.4 (72.3)	22.3 (72.1)	19.8 (67.6)	15.6 (60.1)	11.7 (53.1)	8.9 (48.0)	15.1 (59.2)
Mean daily minimum °C (°F)	2.9 (37.2)	2.6 (36.7)	4.1 (39.4)	5.7 (42.3)	9.0 (48.2)	11.7 (53.1)	13.7 (56.7)	13.7 (56.7)	11.4 (52.5)	8.9 (48.0)	5.4 (41.7)	3.2 (37.8)	7.7 (45.9)
Average rainfall mm (inches)	81.4 (3.20)	58.3 (2.30)	60.0 (2.36)	50.7 (2.00)	49.0 (1.93)	50.4 (1.98)	42.0 (1.65)	50.4 (1.98)	60.4 (2.38)	93.8 (3.69)	94.0 (3.70)	89.2 (3.51)	779.4 (30.69)
Average rainy days (≥ 1.0 mm)	12.2	9.2	10.1	8.8	8.2	7.7	7.4	7.7	8.7	11.5	11.5	11.8	114.7
Mean monthly sunshine hours	63.3	84.4	118.3	179.8	212.1	211.2	221.8	207.7	148.1	113.0	76.6	52.9	1,689.3
Source 1: Met Office (normals) and Met Office
Source 2: Calculated from Met Office Data

Climate data for Southsea, Portsmouth 1976–2006
Month	Jan	Feb	Mar	Apr	May	Jun	Jul	Aug	Sep	Oct	Nov	Dec	Year
Mean daily maximum °C (°F)	9.6 (49.3)	8.8 (47.8)	10.6 (51.1)	13.4 (56.1)	16.8 (62.2)	19.4 (66.9)	21.8 (71.2)	21.8 (71.2)	19.3 (66.7)	15.8 (60.4)	12.0 (53.6)	10.0 (50.0)	14.9 (58.9)
Mean daily minimum °C (°F)	5.1 (41.2)	4.3 (39.7)	5.4 (41.7)	6.4 (43.5)	9.6 (49.3)	12.3 (54.1)	15.0 (59.0)	15.0 (59.0)	12.8 (55.0)	10.9 (51.6)	7.5 (45.5)	5.9 (42.6)	9.2 (48.5)
Average precipitation mm (inches)	65 (2.6)	50 (2.0)	52 (2.0)	42 (1.7)	28 (1.1)	40 (1.6)	32 (1.3)	43 (1.7)	62 (2.4)	81 (3.2)	72 (2.8)	80 (3.1)	647 (25.5)
Average rainy days	11.2	9.5	8.3	7.6	6.5	7.4	5.4	6.6	8.5	10.9	10.3	11.2	103.4
Mean monthly sunshine hours	67.9	89.6	132.7	200.5	240.8	247.6	261.8	240.7	172.9	121.8	82.3	60.5	1,919.1
Percentage possible sunshine	26	31	36	49	51	51	54	54	46	38	31	25	41
Source: Met Office

Climate data for Leckford, Andover elevation 117m, 1971–2000, extremes 1960–2007
Month	Jan	Feb	Mar	Apr	May	Jun	Jul	Aug	Sep	Oct	Nov	Dec	Year
Record high °C (°F)	13.5 (56.3)	15.4 (59.7)	20.0 (68.0)	25.3 (77.5)	27.2 (81.0)	33.5 (92.3)	33.8 (92.8)	34.7 (94.5)	28.9 (84.0)	24.0 (75.2)	17.0 (62.6)	14.9 (58.8)	34.7 (94.5)
Mean daily maximum °C (°F)	7.0 (44.6)	7.3 (45.1)	9.9 (49.8)	12.6 (54.7)	16.3 (61.3)	18.9 (66.0)	21.8 (71.2)	21.8 (71.2)	18.3 (64.9)	14.0 (57.2)	9.9 (49.8)	7.8 (46.0)	13.8 (56.8)
Mean daily minimum °C (°F)	1.2 (34.2)	1.0 (33.8)	2.6 (36.7)	3.7 (38.7)	6.5 (43.7)	9.1 (48.4)	11.3 (52.3)	11.4 (52.5)	9.5 (49.1)	6.9 (44.4)	3.7 (38.7)	2.2 (36.0)	5.8 (42.4)
Record low °C (°F)	−13.9 (7.0)	−10.5 (13.1)	−8.3 (17.1)	−5.6 (21.9)	−2.2 (28.0)	0.6 (33.1)	3.3 (37.9)	4.4 (39.9)	1.0 (33.8)	−3.1 (26.4)	−7.5 (18.5)	−15.6 (3.9)	−15.6 (3.9)
Average precipitation mm (inches)	88.07 (3.47)	58.81 (2.32)	63.31 (2.49)	51.93 (2.04)	50.85 (2.00)	59.27 (2.33)	42.57 (1.68)	59.22 (2.33)	69.60 (2.74)	84.06 (3.31)	82.12 (3.23)	94.9 (3.74)	804.71 (31.68)
Source: KNMI

Climate data for Solent MRSC 1981–2010
Month	Jan	Feb	Mar	Apr	May	Jun	Jul	Aug	Sep	Oct	Nov	Dec	Year
Mean daily maximum °C (°F)	8.2 (46.8)	8.2 (46.8)	10.5 (50.9)	13.2 (55.8)	16.7 (62.1)	19.2 (66.6)	21.4 (70.5)	21.4 (70.5)	19.0 (66.2)	15.5 (59.9)	11.5 (52.7)	8.7 (47.7)	14.5 (58.0)
Mean daily minimum °C (°F)	3.4 (38.1)	2.8 (37.0)	4.5 (40.1)	6.1 (43.0)	9.2 (48.6)	12.1 (53.8)	14.2 (57.6)	14.3 (57.7)	12.2 (54.0)	9.6 (49.3)	6.2 (43.2)	3.8 (38.8)	8.2 (46.8)
Average precipitation mm (inches)	68.8 (2.71)	49.3 (1.94)	51.6 (2.03)	42.4 (1.67)	43.4 (1.71)	42.0 (1.65)	44.5 (1.75)	50.0 (1.97)	53.7 (2.11)	86.2 (3.39)	83.2 (3.28)	83.9 (3.30)	699 (27.51)
Source: UK Met Office

Climate data for Farnborough, Hampshire, UK 1981-2010
Month	Jan	Feb	Mar	Apr	May	Jun	Jul	Aug	Sep	Oct	Nov	Dec	Year
Mean daily maximum °C (°F)	7.7 (45.9)	8.0 (46.4)	10.9 (51.6)	13.8 (56.8)	17.3 (63.1)	20.3 (68.5)	22.7 (72.9)	22.3 (72.1)	19.2 (66.6)	15.0 (59.0)	10.7 (51.3)	7.9 (46.2)	14.7 (58.4)
Mean daily minimum °C (°F)	1.3 (34.3)	1.0 (33.8)	2.7 (36.9)	4.1 (39.4)	7.3 (45.1)	10.3 (50.5)	12.4 (54.3)	12.1 (53.8)	9.7 (49.5)	7.1 (44.8)	3.6 (38.5)	1.6 (34.9)	6.1 (43.0)
Average precipitation mm (inches)	67.8 (2.67)	49.0 (1.93)	50.3 (1.98)	48.5 (1.91)	52.4 (2.06)	45.6 (1.80)	45.0 (1.77)	52.8 (2.08)	57.0 (2.24)	79.2 (3.12)	74.4 (2.93)	69.2 (2.72)	691.2 (27.21)
Average rainy days	11.6	9.4	10.4	9.2	8.9	7.9	7.5	8.1	8.3	11.4	11.6	11.1	115.4
Mean monthly sunshine hours	53.2	75.2	112.2	166.5	193.3	185.0	212.0	201.0	142.9	112.4	67.5	50.6	1,571.8
Source: UK Met Office

== Settlements ==
Some of the larger settlements of Hampshire in red. Five settlements currently undergoing significant planned expansion in green.

For the complete list of settlements see List of places in Hampshire and List of settlements in Hampshire by population.

Hampshire's county town is Winchester, a historic city that was once the capital of the ancient kingdom of Wessex and of England until the Norman Conquest of England. The port cities of Southampton and Portsmouth were split off as independent unitary authorities in 1997, although they are still included in Hampshire for ceremonial purposes. Fareham, Gosport and Havant have grown into a conurbation that stretches along the coast between the two main cities. The three cities are all university cities, Southampton being home to the University of Southampton and Southampton Solent University (formerly Southampton Institute), Portsmouth to the University of Portsmouth, and Winchester to the University of Winchester (formerly known as University College Winchester; King Alfred's College). The northeast of the county houses the Blackwater Valley conurbation, which includes the towns of Farnborough, Aldershot, Blackwater and Yateley and borders both Berkshire and Surrey.

Hampshire lies outside the green belt area of restricted development around London, but has good railway and motorway links to the capital, and in common with the rest of the south-east has seen the growth of dormitory towns since the 1960s. Basingstoke, in the northern part of the county, has grown from a country town into a business and financial centre. Aldershot, Portsmouth, and Farnborough have strong military associations with the Army, Royal Navy, and Royal Air Force respectively. The county also includes several market towns: Alresford, Alton, Andover, Bishop's Waltham, Lymington, New Milton, Petersfield, Ringwood, Romsey and Whitchurch.

== Demographics ==
=== Population ===
At the 2001 census the ceremonial county recorded a population of 1,644,249, of which 1,240,103 were in the administrative county, 217,445 were in the unitary authority of Southampton, and 186,701 were in Portsmouth. The population of the administrative county grew 5.6 per cent from the 1991 census and Southampton grew 6.2 per cent (Portsmouth remained unchanged), compared with 2.6 per cent for England and Wales as a whole. Eastleigh and Winchester grew fastest at 9 per cent each.

Southampton and Portsmouth are the main settlements within the South Hampshire conurbation, which is home to about half of the ceremonial county's population. The larger South Hampshire metropolitan area has a population of 1,547,000.

Cities and towns by population size: (2001 census)

- Southampton – 244,224
- Portsmouth – 207,100
- Basingstoke – 90,171 (town), 152,573 (borough)
- Gosport – 69,348 (town), 77,000 (borough)
- Andover – 64,000
- Waterlooville – 63,558
- Aldershot – 58,120
- Farnborough – 57,147
- Fareham/Portchester – 56,010 (town), 109,619 (borough)
- Eastleigh – 52,894 (town), 116,177 (borough)
- Havant – 45,435 (town), 115,300 (borough)
- Winchester – 41,420 (city), 116,600 (district)
- Fleet – 32,726
- Petersfield-14,974 (town)

The table below shows the population change up to the 2011 census, contrasting the previous census. It also shows the proportion of residents in each district reliant upon lowest income and/or joblessness benefits, the national average proportion of which was 4.5 per cent (August 2012). The most populous district of Hampshire is New Forest District.

Population from census to census. Claimants of JSA or Income Support (DWP)
Unit	JSA or Inc. Supp. claimants (August 2012) % of 2011 population	JSA and Income Support claimants (August 2001) % of 2001 population	Population (April 2011)	Population (April 2001)
Hampshire	2.4%	4.3%	1,317,788	1,240,103
Ranked by district
Borough of Havant	4.1%	7.2%	120,684	116,849
Borough of Gosport	3.7%	5.7%	82,622	76,415
Borough of Rushmoor	2.9%	4.1%	93,807	90,987
Borough of Basingstoke and Deane	2.6%	3.8%	167,799	152,573
Borough of Eastleigh	2.3%	4.0%	125,199	116,169
New Forest District	2.2%	4.7%	176,462	169,331
Borough of Fareham	2.0%	3.7%	111,581	107,977
Borough of Test Valley	2.0%	3.8%	116,398	109,801
East Hampshire District	1.8%	4.0%	115,608	109,274
Winchester District	1.7%	3.6%	116,595	107,222
Hart District	1.3%	2.3%	91,033	83,505

=== Ethnicity and religion ===
At the 2011 census, about 89 per cent of residents were white British, falling to 85.87 per cent in Southampton. The significant ethnic minorities were Asian at 2.6 per cent and mixed race at 1.4 per cent; 10 per cent of residents were born outside the UK. 59.7 per cent stated their religion as Christian and 29.5 per cent as not religious. Significant minority religions were Islam (1.46 per cent) and Hinduism (0.73 per cent).

The Church of England Diocese of Winchester was founded in 676AD and covers about two thirds of Hampshire and extends into Dorset. Smaller parts of Hampshire are covered by the dioceses of Portsmouth, Guildford and Oxford.

The Roman Catholic Diocese of Portsmouth covers Hampshire as well as the Isle of Wight and the Channel Islands.

== Politics ==
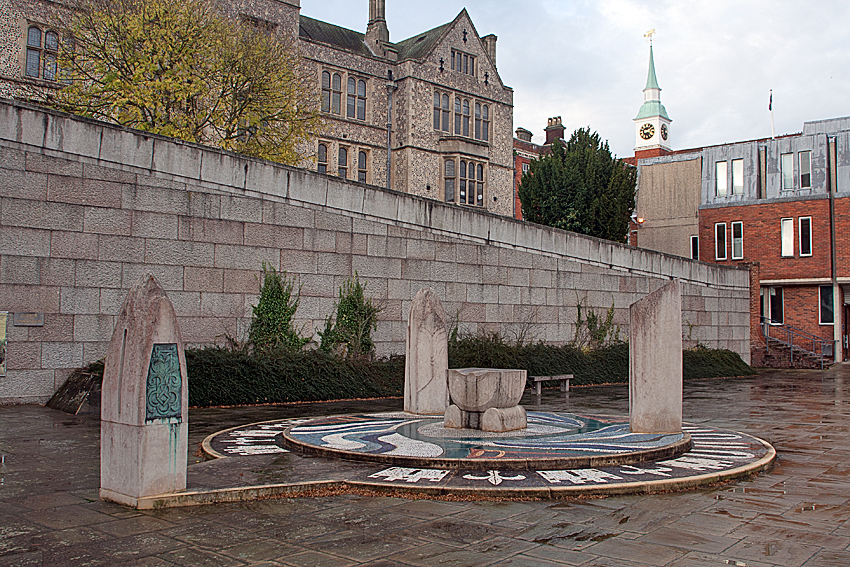
Hampshire County Council offices and Jubilee Fountain

The coat of arms of Hampshire County Council

With the exceptions of the unitary authorities of Portsmouth and Southampton, Hampshire is governed by Hampshire County Council based at Castle Hill in Winchester, with eleven non-metropolitan districts beneath it and, for the majority of the county, parish councils or town councils at the local level.

In the 2016 United Kingdom European Union membership referendum, nearly 55% of Hampshire (including the Isle of Wight) voted in favour of Brexit. Gosport was the area that voted to Leave with the highest majority (64%), while Winchester was the area that voted to Remain with the highest majority (59%). Hart and East Hampshire also voted to Remain.

In June 2026, the Hampshire and the Solent Combined County Authority was created, comprising Hampshire County Council, Isle of Wight Council, Portsmouth City Council and Southampton City Council. It is planned that the authority will be led by a directly elected mayor from 2028.

In March 2026, the government announced local government reorganisation plans, which would have seen the county council abolished in 2028 and local government across Hampshire (including Southampton and Portsmouth) reorganised into four unitary authorities. These proposals were withdrawn in September 2026.

=== Parliament ===
As of the 2024 General Election, Hampshire elects 19 Members of Parliament, 9 MPs are Conservative, 6 MPs are Labour, and 3 are Liberal Democrats. Suella Braverman was elected as a conservative but later defected to the Reform party.

In the 2019 General Election there were no seat changes, with the 16 Conservative constituencies and 2 Labour constituencies holding on to the same seats won or held in 2017. This is despite the Liberal Democrats gaining 57,876 more votes (an increase of 50.4%) compared to 2017, and Labour losing 72,278 votes (29.9%) compared to 2017.

At the 2017 General Election, the Conservatives won 16 seats, continuing their dominance in the county. Labour took two seats, Southampton Test and Portsmouth South.

In the 2015 general election, every Hampshire seat except Southampton Test (Labour) was won by the Conservatives. In 2010, 14 constituencies were represented by Conservative Members of Parliament (MPs), two by the Liberal Democrats, and two by Labour. Labour represented the largest urban centre, holding both Southampton constituencies (Test and Itchen). The Liberal Democrats held Portsmouth South and Eastleigh.

The Conservatives represent a mix of rural and urban areas: Aldershot, Basingstoke, East Hampshire, Fareham, Gosport, Havant, Meon Valley, North East Hampshire, North West Hampshire, New Forest East, New Forest West, Portsmouth North, Romsey and Southampton North and Winchester.

At the 2013 local elections for Hampshire County Council, the Conservative Party had a 37.51 per cent share of the votes, the Liberal Democrats 21.71 per cent, the UK Independence Party 24.61 per cent and Labour 10 per cent. As a result, 45 Conservatives, 17 Liberal Democrats, 10 UKIP, four Labour and one Community Campaign councillor sit on the County Council. Southampton City Council, which is a separate Unitary Authority, has 28 Labour, 16 Conservative, 2 Councillors Against the Cuts and 2 Liberal Democrat councillors. Portsmouth City Council, also a UA, has 25 Liberal Democrat, 12 Conservative and 5 Labour councillors.

Hampshire has its own County Youth Council (HCYC) and is an independent youth-run organisation. It meets once a month around Hampshire and aims to give the young people of Hampshire a voice. It also has numerous district and borough youth councils including Basingstoke's "Basingstoke & Deane Youth Council".

== Emergency services ==
- Hampshire and Isle of Wight Fire and Rescue Service
- South Central Ambulance Service
- South East Coast Ambulance Service
- Hampshire & Isle of Wight Air Ambulance
- Hampshire Constabulary
- British Transport Police
- HM Coastguard

== Economy ==
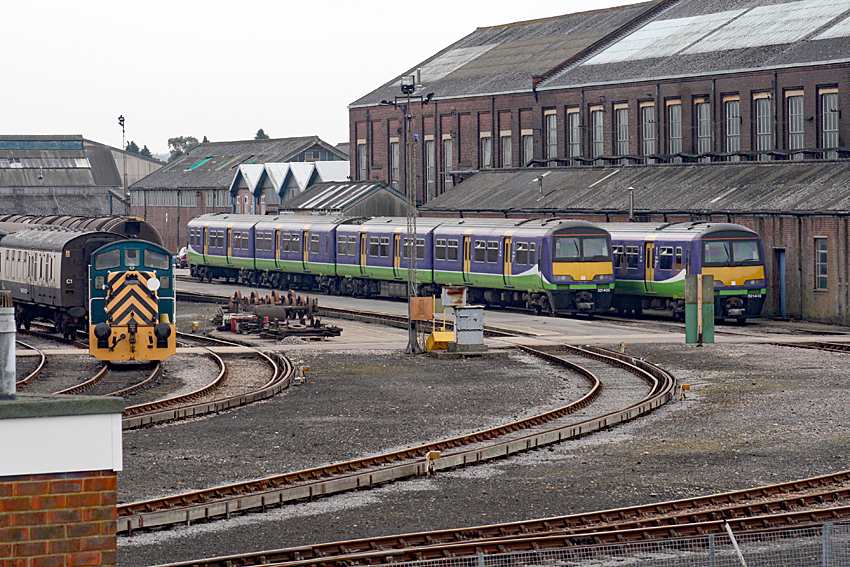
Eastleigh railway works

Hampshire is one of the most affluent counties in the country, with a gross domestic product (GDP) of £29 billion, excluding Southampton and Portsmouth. In 2018, Hampshire had a GDP per capita of £22,100, comparable with the UK as a whole.

Portsmouth and Winchester have the highest job densities in the county; 38 per cent of workplace workers in Portsmouth commuted into the city in 2011. Southampton has the highest number of total jobs and commuting both into and out of the city is high. The county has a lower level of unemployment than the national average, at 1.3 per cent when the national rate is 2.1 per cent, as of February 2018. About one third are employed by large firms. Hampshire has a considerably higher than national average employment in high-tech industries, but average levels in knowledge-based industry. About 25 per cent of the population work in the public sector. Tourism accounts for some 60,000 jobs in the county, around 9 per cent of the total.

One of the principal companies in the high tech sector is IBM which has its research and development laboratories at Hursley and its UK headquarters at Cosham.

Many rural areas of Hampshire have traditionally been reliant on agriculture, particularly dairy farming, although the significance of agriculture as a rural employer and rural wealth creator has declined since the first half of the 20th century and agriculture currently employs 1.32 per cent of the rural population.

The extractive industries deal principally with sand, gravel, clay and hydrocarbons. There are three active oilfields in Hampshire with one being also used as a natural gas store. These are in the west of the county in the Wessex Basin. The Weald Basin to the east has potential as a source of shale oil but is not currently exploited.

The New Forest area is a national park, and tourism is a significant economic segment in this area, with 7.5 million visitors in 1992. The South Downs and the cities of Portsmouth, Southampton, and Winchester also attract tourists to the county. Southampton Boat Show is one of the biggest annual events held in the county, and attracts visitors from throughout the country. In 2003, the county had a total of 31 million day visits, and 4.2 million longer stays.

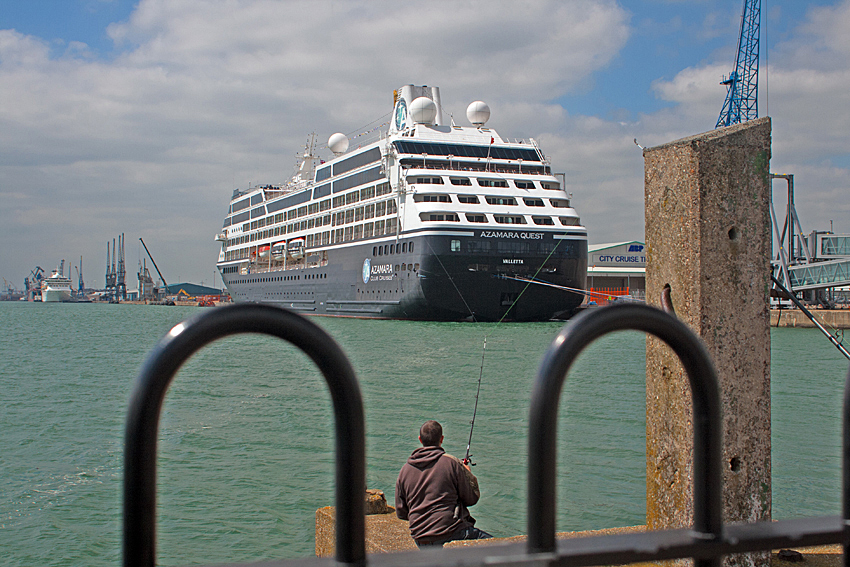
Southampton Docks

The cities of Southampton and Portsmouth are both significant ports, with Southampton Docks handling a large proportion of the national container freight traffic as well as being a major base for cruise liners, and Portsmouth Harbour accommodating one of the Royal Navy's main bases and a terminal for cross-channel ferries to France and Spain. The docks have traditionally been large employers in these cities, though mechanisation of cargo handling has led to a reduction in manpower needed.

The Marine Accident Investigation Branch has its principal offices in Southampton, while the Air Accidents Investigation Branch has its head office in Farnborough in Rushmoor District . The Rail Accident Investigation Branch has one of its two offices at Farnborough.

== Transport ==
=== Air ===
Southampton Airport, with an accompanying main line railway station, is an international airport situated in the Borough of Eastleigh, close to Swaythling in the city of Southampton. The Farnborough International Airshow is a week-long event that combines a major trade exhibition for the aerospace and defence industries with a public airshow. The event is held in mid-July in even-numbered years at Farnborough Airport. The first five days (Monday to Friday) are dedicated to trade, with the final two days open to the public.

=== Sea ===
Cross-channel and cross-Solent ferries from Southampton, Portsmouth and Lymington link the county to the Isle of Wight, the Channel Islands and continental Europe.

=== Rail ===
The South West Main Line, (operated by South Western Railway) from London Waterloo to Weymouth, runs through Winchester and Southampton, and the Wessex Main Line from Bristol Temple Meads to Portsmouth Harbour also runs through the county, as does the Portsmouth Direct Line and the West of England line.

=== Road ===
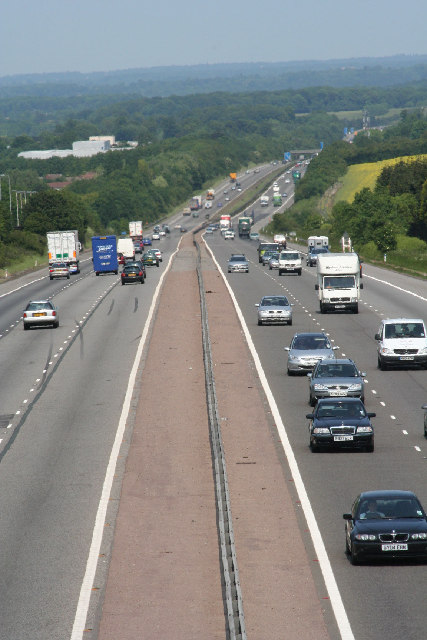
The M3 near Basingstoke

The M3 motorway bisects the county from the southwest, at the edge of the New Forest near Southampton, to the northeast, on its way to connect with the M25 London orbital motorway. At its southern end it links with the M27 south coast motorway. The construction of the Twyford Down cutting near Winchester caused major controversy by cutting through a series of ancient trackways and other features of archaeological significance. The M27 serves as a bypass for the major conurbations and as a link to other settlements on the south coast. Other important roads include the A27, A3, A31, A34, A36 and A303.

The county has a high level of car ownership, with only 15.7 per cent having no access to a private car compared with 26.8 per cent for England and Wales. The county has a lower than average use of trains (3.2 compared with 4.1 per cent for commuting) and buses (3.2 to 7.4 per cent), but a higher than average use of bicycles (3.5 to 2.7 per cent) and cars (63.5 to 55.3 per cent).

=== Inland waterways ===
Hampshire formerly had several canals, but most of these have been abandoned and their routes built over. The Basingstoke Canal has been extensively restored, and is now navigable for most of its route, but the Salisbury and Southampton Canal, Andover Canal and Portsmouth and Arundel Canal have all disappeared. Restoration of the Itchen Navigation, linking Southampton and Winchester, primarily as a wildlife corridor, began in 2008.

== Education ==
The school system in Hampshire (including Southampton and Portsmouth) is comprehensive. Geographically inside the Hampshire LEA are 24 independent schools, Southampton has three and Portsmouth has four. Few Hampshire schools have sixth forms, which varies by district council. There are 14 further education colleges within the Hampshire LEA, including six graded as 'outstanding' by Ofsted: Alton College, Barton Peveril Sixth Form College, Brockenhurst College, Farnborough College of Technology, Farnborough Sixth Form College, Peter Symonds College, Queen Mary's College, and South Downs College.

Notable independent schools in the county include Winchester College, allegedly England's oldest public school, founded in 1382, and the pioneering co-educational Bedales School, founded in 1893.

The four universities are the University of Southampton, Solent University, the University of Portsmouth, and the University of Winchester (which also had a small campus in Basingstoke until 2011). Farnborough College of Technology awards University of Surrey-accredited degrees.

== Health ==
There are major NHS hospitals in each of the cities, and smaller hospitals in several towns, as well as a number of private hospitals. Southern Health NHS Foundation Trust coordinates public health services, while Hampshire Hospitals NHS Foundation Trust coordinates hospital services.

== Culture, arts and sport ==
=== Flag ===
The flag of the historic county of Hampshire

The Flag of Hampshire was officially added to the Flag Institute's registry of flags on 12 March 2019 after receiving support from Hampshire County Council, the Lord Lieutenant of Hampshire, and many local organisations. The county day and flag day is 15 July, St Swithun's Day; St Swithun was an Anglo-Saxon bishop of Winchester.

=== Music ===
Hampshire is the home of many orchestras, bands, and groups. Musician Laura Marling hails originally from Hampshire. The Hampshire County Youth Choir is based in Winchester, and has had successful tours of Canada and Italy in recent years. The Hampshire County Youth Orchestra (with its associated chamber orchestra and string orchestra) is based at Thornden Hall.

=== Museums ===
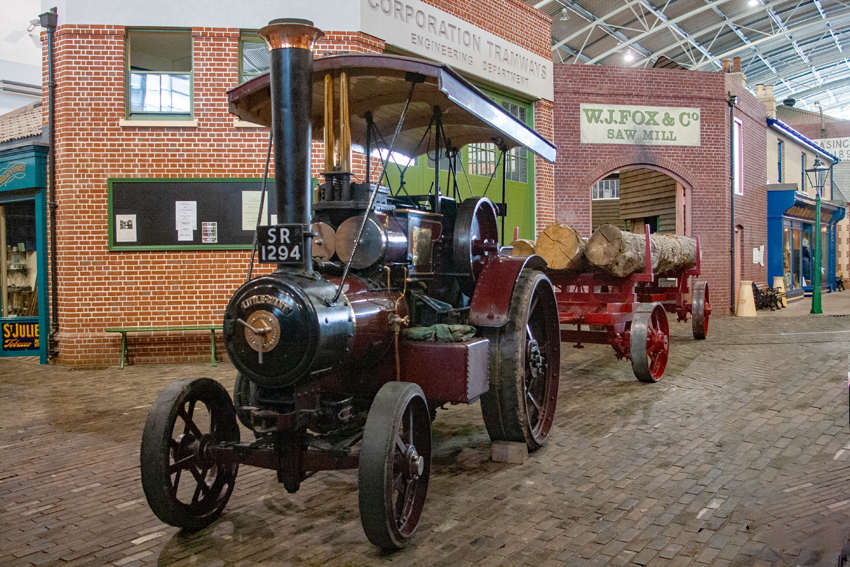
Milestones Museum, Basingstoke

There are a number of local museums, such as the City Museum in Winchester, which covers the Iron Age and Roman periods, the Middle Ages, and the Victorian period over three floors. A "Museum of the Iron Age" is in Andover. Solent Sky Museum depicts the story of aviation in Hampshire and the Solent region, with more than 20 airframes from the golden age. Southampton's Sea City Museum is primarily focused on the city's links with the Titanic. Basingstoke's Milestones Museum records the county's industrial heritage. There are also a number of national museums in Hampshire. The National Motor Museum is located in the New Forest at Beaulieu. The Royal Navy Museum is part of Portsmouth Historic Dockyard. Other military museums include The Submarine Museum at Gosport, the Royal Marines Museum, originally in Southsea but was due to transfer to the Dockyard in 2019, the Aldershot Military Museum, the D-Day Story by Southsea Castle and the Museum of Army Flying at Middle Wallop. Several museums and historic buildings in Hampshire are the responsibility of the Hampshire Cultural Trust. Specialist museums include the Gilbert White museum in his old home in Selborne, which also includes The Oates Collection, dedicated to the explorer Lawrence Oates.

=== Annual events ===
The New Forest and Hampshire County Show takes place annually at the end of July; 2020 will mark its centenary. The largest gathering of Muslims in Western Europe, Jalsa Salana, takes place near Alton, with 37,000 visitors in 2017. The ancient festival of Beltain takes place at Butser Ancient Farm in the spring.

=== Buildings and protected monuments ===
There are 187 Grade I listed buildings in the county, ranging from statues to farm buildings and churches to castles, 511 buildings listed Grade II*, and many more listed in the Grade II category. National Heritage's figures include the Isle of Wight, listing 208 Grade I buildings, 578 Grade II*and 10,372 Grade II, 731 scheduled monuments, two wrecks, 91 parks and gardens, and a battlefield: the Battle of Cheriton, which took place in 1644, near Winchester.

=== Sport ===
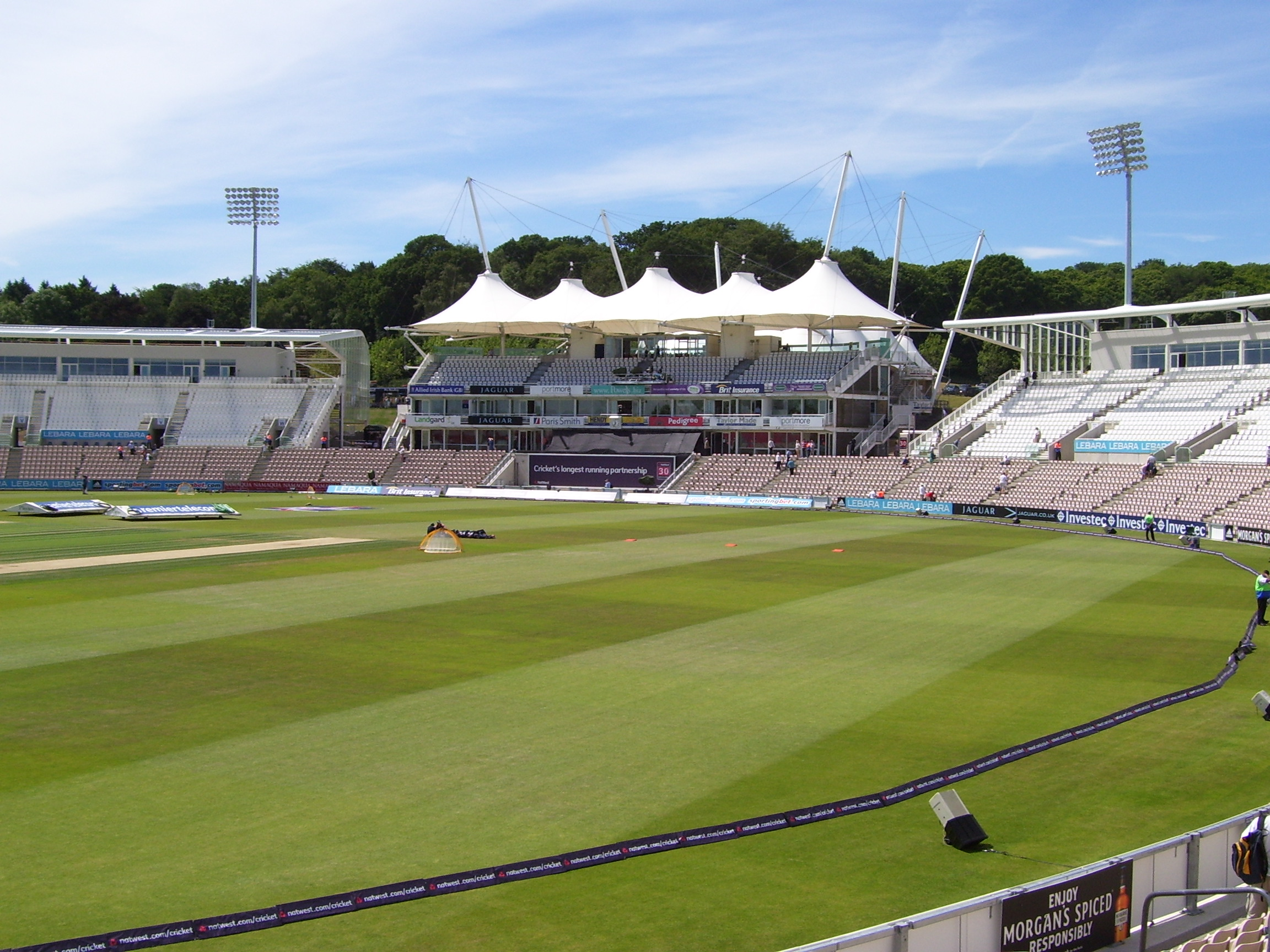
Rose Bowl cricket ground in 2010

The game of cricket was largely developed in south-east England, with one of the first teams forming at Hambledon in 1750, with the Hambledon Club creating many of cricket's early laws. Hampshire County Cricket Club is a first-class team. The main county ground is the Rose Bowl (cricket ground), currently sponsored by Utilita; located in West End, it has hosted one day internationals and, following redevelopment, hosted its first test match in 2011.

The world's oldest surviving bowling green is the Southampton Old Bowling Green, which was first used in 1299.

Hampshire's relatively safe waters have allowed the county to develop as one of the busiest sailing areas in the country, with many yacht clubs and several manufacturers on the Solent. The Hamble, Beaulieu and Lymington rivers are major centres for both competitive and recreational sailing, along with Hythe and Ocean Village marinas. The sport of windsurfing was invented at Hayling Island in the south east of the county.

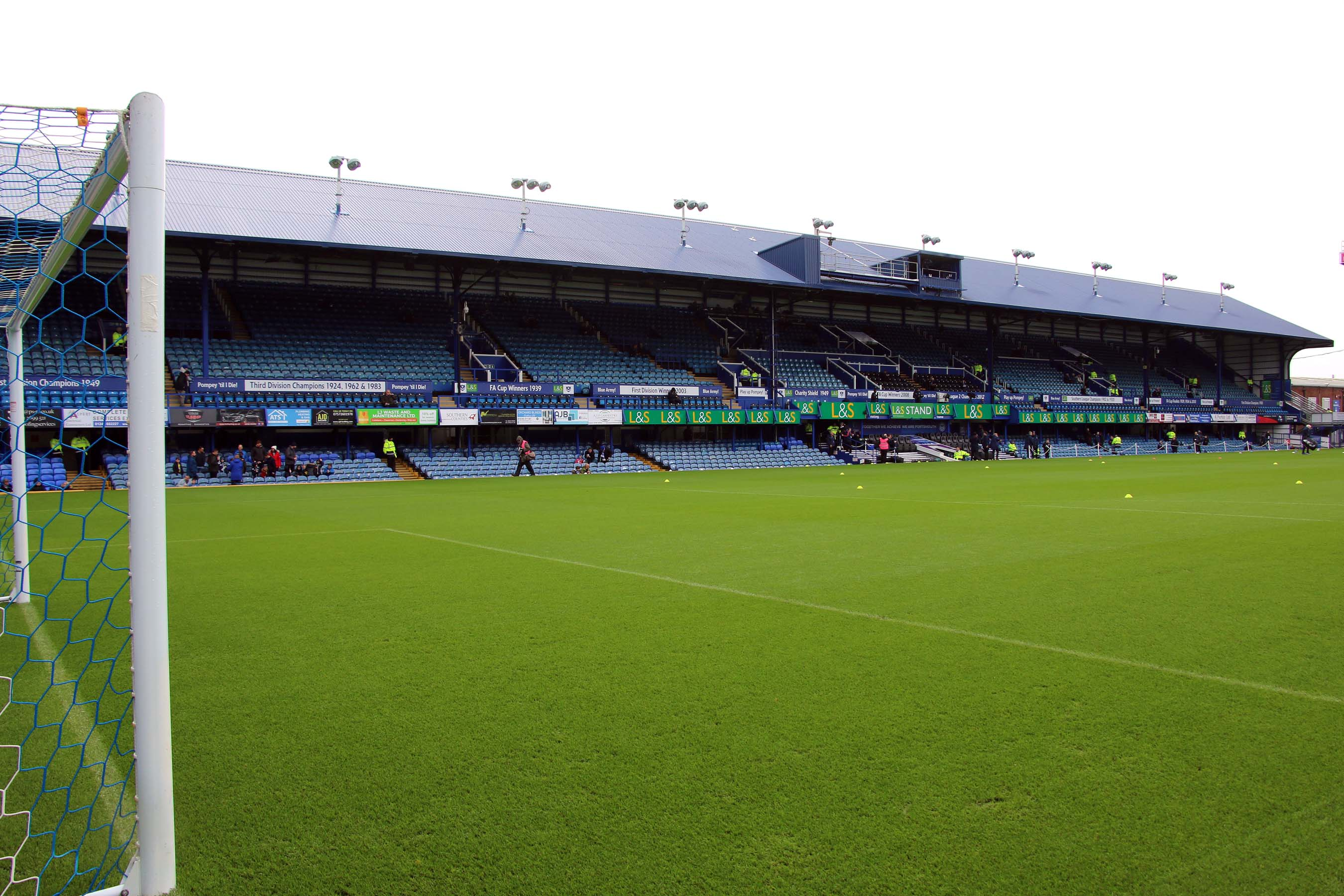
Fratton Park football ground, Portsmouth, South Stand, 2019

Hampshire has several association football teams, including EFL Championship sides Portsmouth and Southampton, and National League sides Aldershot Town, Eastleigh and Havant & Waterlooville. Portsmouth and Southampton have traditionally been fierce rivals. Portsmouth won the FA Cup in 1939 and 2008 and the Football League title in 1949 and 1950. Southampton won the FA Cup in 1976 and reached the final in 1900, 1902, and 2003, as well as finishing second in the Football League in 1984. Aldershot were members of the Football League from 1932 until they folded in 1992. They were succeeded by Aldershot Town, who in 2008 were crowned the Conference Premier champions and promoted to the Football League but were relegated back to the Conference at the end of the 2012–13 season. Hampshire has a number of Non League football teams. Bashley, Gosport Borough and AFC Totton play in the Southern Football League Premier Division, and Sholing and Winchester City play in the Southern Football League Division One South and West.

Thruxton Circuit, in the north of the county, is Hampshire's premier motor racing circuit, with a karting circuit; there are other karting circuits at Southampton and Gosport. The other main circuit was the Ringwood Raceway at Matchams.

Lasham Airfield, near Alton, is a major centre for gliding, hosting both regional and national annual competitions.

=== Media ===
==== Television ====
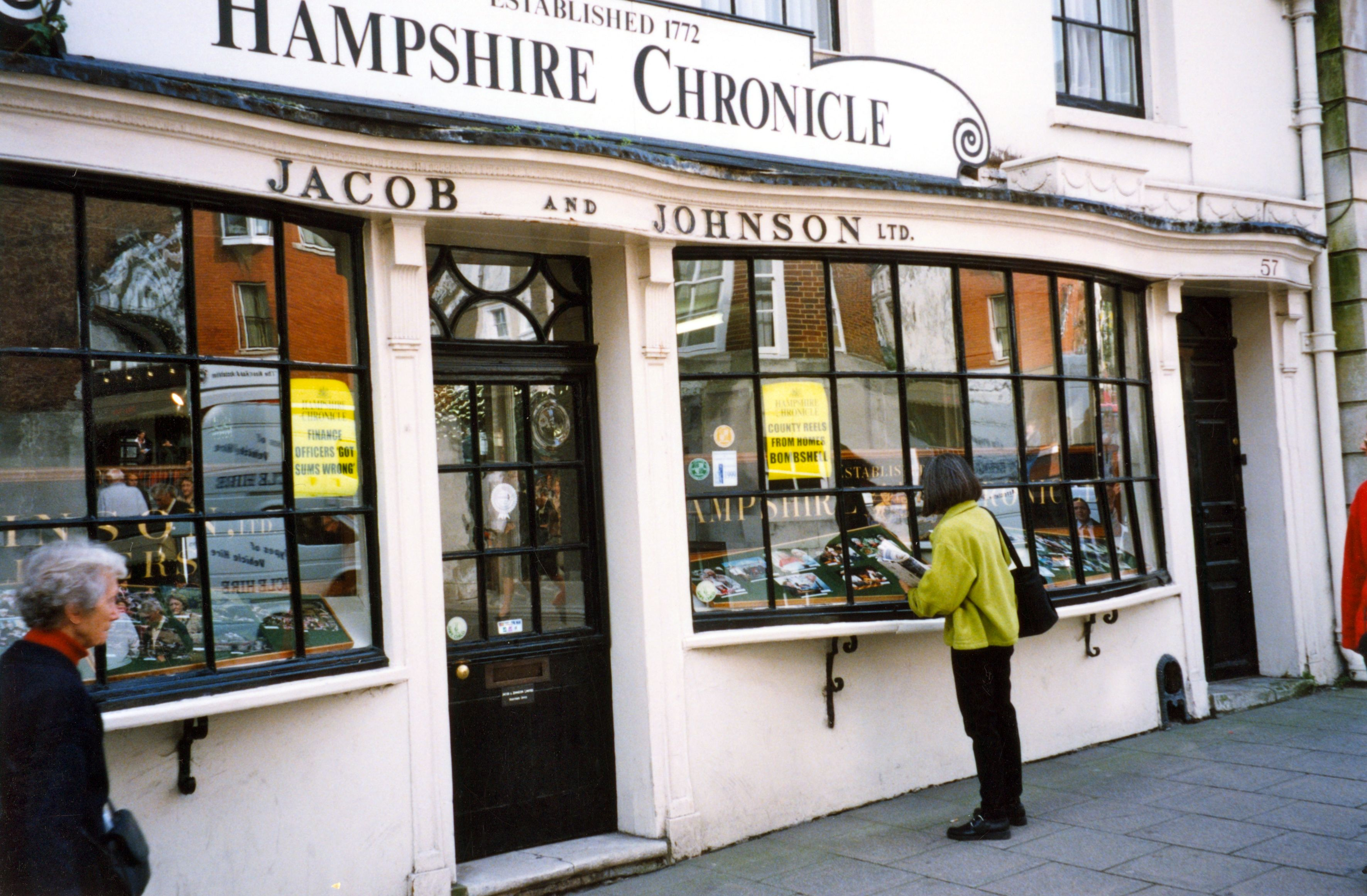
Former Hampshire Chronicle office in Winchester, c. 1999

The county's television news is covered by BBC South Today from its studios in Southampton and ITV Meridian from a studio in Whiteley, though both BBC London and ITV London can be received in northern and eastern parts of the county. A local independent television station, That's Hampshire, started transmitting in May 2017.

==== Radio ====
BBC Local Radio for the county is provided by BBC Radio Solent, BBC Radio Berkshire (covering Basingstoke and Andover) and BBC Radio Surrey (covering Aldershot, Farnborough and Fleet). County-wide commercial radio stations include Heart South, Capital South, Easy Radio South Coast, Nation Radio South Coast and Greatest Hits Radio South. There are many community radio stations for local communities across the county, such as Unity 101, Voice FM 103.9, and Andover Radio. The University of Southampton and the University of Portsmouth have campus-based student radio stations Surge Radio and Pure FM respectively, with students at Winchester's Peter Symonds College creating programming for Outreach Radio through the enrichment society of Symonds Radio.

==== Press ====
Southampton and Portsmouth support daily newspapers; the Southern Daily Echo and The News respectively. The Basingstoke Gazette is published three times a week. Weekly papers include the Hampshire Chronicle, which is one of the oldest newspapers in the country.

== Notable people ==
Possibly the most notable resident was the Duke of Wellington, who lived at Stratfield Saye House in the north of the county from 1817. An eminent Victorian, who made her mark and "came home" to Hampshire for burial at East Wellow was Florence Nightingale.

Hampshire's literary connections include the birthplace of authors Jane Austen, Wilbert Awdry and Charles Dickens, and the residence of others, such as Charles Kingsley and Mrs Gaskell. Austen lived most of her life in Hampshire, where her father was rector of Steventon, and wrote all of her novels in the county. Alice Liddell, also known as Alice Hargreaves, the inspiration for Alice in Lewis Carroll's 1865 novel Alice's Adventures in Wonderland, lived in and around Lyndhurst, Hampshire after her marriage to Reginald Hargreaves, and is buried in the graveyard of St Michael and All Angels Church in the town.

Hampshire also has many visual art connections, claiming the painter John Everett Millais as a native, and the cities and countryside have been the subject of paintings by L. S. Lowry and J. M. W. Turner. Selborne was the home of naturalist Gilbert White. Journalist and social critic Christopher Hitchens was born into a naval family in Portsmouth. Broadcasters Philippa Forrester, Amanda Lamb and Scott Mills also are from the county. American actor and gameshow host, Richard Dawson, was born and raised here. Richard St. Barbe Baker, founder of the International Tree Foundation and responsible for the planting of over two billion trees was born in West End.

== See also ==
- Business in Hampshire
- Custos Rotulorum of Hampshire—Keepers of the Rolls
- Hampshire (UK Parliament constituency)—Historical list of MPs for Hampshire constituency
- List of High Sheriffs of Hampshire
- List of churches in Hampshire
- List of English and Welsh endowed schools (19th century)#County of Southampton
- Places of interest in Hampshire
- Recreational walks in Hampshire
