= Half-Breed =

Half-Breed may refer to:

- Half-breed, a derogatory term for a person of mixed race
- Half-Breed (album), a 1973 album by Cher
  - "Half-Breed" (song), the title track
- "Half-Breed" (short story), a science fiction story by Isaac Asimov
- Halfbreed (album), a 1968 album by the Keef Hartley Band
- Half Breed (film), a 1913 Swedish film
- The Half-Breed (1916 film), directed by Allan Dwan and starring Douglas Fairbanks
- The Half Breed (1922 film), an American silent film directed by Charles A. Taylor
- The Half-Breed (1952 film), an American film starring Robert Young
- Half-Breed (politics), member of the moderate wing of the United States Republican Party in the late 19th century
- Halfbreed (book), a memoir by Maria Campbell

== See also ==
- Half-caste
- Halfblood (disambiguation)
