= List of settlements in Hampshire by population =

Some of the larger settlements of the county of Hampshire, with cities in bold, and district centres in yellow. Lyndhurst, district HQ for New Forest also shown.

This is a list of settlements in Hampshire by population based on the results of the 2011 census. In 2011, there were 42 built-up area subdivisions with 5,000 or more inhabitants in Hampshire, shown in the table below.

== Population ranking ==
#	Settlement	Borough/District	Population (2001)	Population (2011)
1	Southampton	Southampton	234,280	253,651
2	Portsmouth	Portsmouth	219,700	238,137
3	Basingstoke	Basingstoke and Deane	93,970	107,355
4	Eastleigh	Eastleigh	72,400	78,716
5	Gosport	Gosport	69,270	71,529
6	Farnborough	Rushmoor	64,980	65,034
7	Winchester	Winchester	61,420	63,184
8	Aldershot	Rushmoor	55,470	57,211
9	Andover	Test Valley	52,000	55,758
10	Alton	East Hampshire	50,410	52,261
11	Fleet	Hart	43,700	50,726
12	Havant	Havant	42,880	45,125
13	Locks Heath/Warsash/Whiteley	Fareham	39,200	43,359
14	Fareham	Fareham	40,972	42,210
15	Totton	New Forest	27,680	28,676
16	Hedge End	Eastleigh	23,130	25,117
17	Stubbington	Fareham	21,710	24,644
18	Hythe	New Forest	19,600	20,201
19	New Milton	New Forest	18,440	19,969
20	Emsworth	Havant	18,139	18,777
21	Romsey	Test Valley	17,039	16,998
22	Bordon	East Hampshire	16,180	16,035
23	Lyndhurst	New Forest	16,180	16,035
24	Tadley	Basingstoke and Deane	15,983	15,836
25	South Hayling	Havant	14,842	15,485
26	Lymington	New Forest	14,136	15,218
27	Petersfield	East Hampshire	13,300	14,974
28	Yateley	Hart	15,395	14,829
29	Ringwood	New Forest	13,387	13,943
30	Blackfield	New Forest	13,775	13,712
31	Hook	Hart	6,970	7,934
32	Blackwater	Hart	7,168	7,195
33	Bursledon	Eastleigh	6,744	6,955
34	North Baddesley	Test Valley	6,230	6,823
35	Liphook	East Hampshire	6,031	6,480
36	Netley	Eastleigh	6,150	6,338
37	Bishop's Waltham	Winchester	6,085	6,275
38	Liss	East Hampshire	5,970	6,248
39	Marchwood	New Forest	5,586	6,141
40	Denmead	Winchester	5,788	6,107
41	Fordingbridge	New Forest	5,694	5,998
42	New Alresford	Winchester	5,102	5,431
43	Oakley	Basingstoke and Deane	5,238	5,086
44	Hartley Wintney	Hart	4,405	4,999
45	Headley Down	East Hampshire	4,870	4,943
46	Kings Worthy/Springvale	Winchester	4,469	4,901
47	Four Marks	East Hampshire	4,230	4,799
48	Hamble-le-Rice	Eastleigh	4,150	4,695
49	Whitchurch	Basingstoke and Deane	4,343	4,676
50	Winchfield	Hart	4,343	4,676
51	Bentley	East Hampshire	1,343	1,676
52	Eversley	Hart	830	1,330

== See also ==
- List of towns and cities in England by population
- Hampshire
