= Clean and Unclean =

Clean and Unclean may refer to:

- Clean and unclean animals, religious views on clean and unclean animals
- Tumah and taharah, ritual "purity" and "impurity" under Jewish law

== See also ==
- Unclean (disambiguation)
