= Purity =

Purity may refer to:

== Books ==
- Pureza (novel), a 1937 Brazilian novel by José Lins do Rego
- Purity (novel), a 2015 novel by Jonathan Franzen
  - Purity (TV series), a TV series based on the novel
- Purity, a 2012 novel by Jackson Pearce
- Purity, a 1998 novel by Shaun Hutson
- Purity, a 2007 play by Thomas Bradshaw (playwright)
- "Cleanness", also known as "Purity", a 14th-century poem

== Companies ==
- Purity Dairies, a dairy company in Nashville, Tennessee, United States
- Purity Factories, a food processing company in St. John's, Newfoundland and Labrador, Canada
- Purity Distilling Company, an alcohol manufacturer involved in the Boston Molasses Disaster in the U.S.
- Purity FM, a Nigerian radio station
- Purity, a former supermarket brand owned by Woolworths (Australia)

== Film ==
- Purity (film), a 1916 motion picture
- Purity by Anat Zuria
- Black oil (The X-Files) (also known as Purity), a fictional alien virus in the TV series The X-Files

== Music ==
- "Purity" (Slipknot song), 1999
- "Purity" (ASAP Rocky song), 2018
- Purity (album), a 2003 album by Hate Forest

== Places ==
- Purity Mountain, a summit in Canada

== Religion ==
- Purity, the absence of vice in human character, synonymous with chastity when used in reference to a person's sexual nature
- Ritual purification, a feature of many religions
- Purity in Buddhism, a spiritual purity of character or essence
- Ritual purity in Islam, both a literal and metaphorical cleanliness

== Science ==
- Purity, the absence of impurity or contaminants in a substance; for example, Chemical purity
- Purity, the proportion of a named pure substance in a sample (by weight, mass, volume, or count)
- Fineness, several units of purity of precious metals
- Nine (purity), an informal unit of purity
- Purity, the colorfulness of a light source
- Purity (quantum mechanics), a measure of correlation between a system and its environment
- Purity (algebraic geometry), a lack of unmixed-ness

== See also ==
- Blood purity (disambiguation)
- Chemical purity
- Concentration
- Impurity (disambiguation)
- Pure (disambiguation)
