= Business in Hampshire =

Hampshire's total economy (worth £22.9bn) is the largest economy in England outside London, providing almost 3% of total GDP for the UK as a whole.

== Law and regulations ==
Hampshire Trading Standards Service originated from the initial introduction of the Weights and Measures Act, and is still better known as the Inspectors of Weights and Measures. Trading Standards Service activities are still primarily enforcement of the Weights and Measures Act, but also has the following responsibilities, in whole or in part, as of 31 March 1988;

- Agriculture Act 1970 (part IV)
- Agricultural Produce (Grading and Marking) Act 1928 and Agricultural Produce (Grading and Marking) Amendment Act 1931
- Animal Health Act 1981
- Business Names Act 1985
- Consumer Credit Act 1974
- Consumer Protection Act 1987
- Control of Pollution Act 1974
- Energy Conservation Act 1981
- European Communities Act 1972
- Fair Trading Act 1973
- Food Act 1984
- Hallmarking Act 1973
- Health and Safety at Work etc. Act 1974
- Medicines Act 1968
- Petroleum (Consolidation) Act 1928 and Petroleum (Transfer of Licences) Act 1936
- Road Traffic Act 1972 and Road Traffic Act 1974
- Telecommunications Act 1984
- Tourism (Sleeping Accommodation Price Display) Order 1977 (SI 1977/1877)
- Trade Descriptions Act 1968
- Weights and Measures Act 1985.

== Business award schemes ==
Hampshire County Council and the Economic Development Office sponsor a number of local business awards.

== Business directories ==
These web sites provide information on local Hampshire businesses (as opposed to UK-wide Business directories);

- Hampshire County Council
- iHampshire
- South Online

== See also ==
- Hampshire#Economy
- Small business
- Business Link
