= Blood purity =

Blood purity and related terms such as full blood, half-blood, or pureblood may refer to:

- Blood purity, a fictional concept of wizarding ancestry in the Harry Potter series
- Blood quantum laws, tribal laws in the United States defining Native American status
- Full-blood, a deprecated term used in the past to denote proportional representation of Aboriginality in Australia, along with terms such as "half-caste"
- Half Blood (mixtape), a 2025 mixtape by Slayr
- Limpieza de sangre, blood purity laws in Medieval Spain stipulating a social hierarchy based on ancestry
- Pureblood, a term used in COVID-19 anti-vaccine activism to denote people who have not been vaccinated
- Racial hygiene, an approach to eugenics in the early 20th century especially by Nazi Germany

== See also ==
- Blood (disambiguation)
- Purity (disambiguation)
