= Half-Blood Prince (disambiguation) =

Half-Blood Prince generally refers to the novel Harry Potter and the Half-Blood Prince by J. K. Rowling.

Half-Blood Prince may also refer to:

- Harry Potter and the Half-Blood Prince (film), the film adaptation of the novel, directed by David Yates
- Harry Potter and the Half-Blood Prince (soundtrack), the soundtrack to the film, composed by Nicholas Hooper
- Harry Potter and the Half-Blood Prince (video game), the game based on the film
- Severus Snape, the character referred to in the title
