= Pure FM (Portsmouth) =

Portsmouth; England
- Broadcast area: United Kingdom, Worldwide (Online Website)

Programming
- Language: English
- Format: Student radio, internet radio
- Affiliations: UK Student Radio Association

Ownership
- Owner: University of Portsmouth Students' Union

History
- First air date: 1994
- Call sign meaning: "Portsmouth University Radio Experience"

Links
- Website: www.thisispurefm.com

Pure FM (Portsmouth University Radio Experience) is an official student-led radio station broadcast by student members at the University of Portsmouth.

As a student media of the University of Portsmouth Students' Union, the station is supported by the union and is housed within the University Student Union on Cambridge Road.

== History ==
Pure FM was launched in 1994. The Station has had continuous broadcasting until an abrupt end in 2020 where it was halted due to the Pandemic, major upgrading of the studio ecosystem and flooding water damages to the 2 studios and equipment.

In 2023, Pure FM hosted multiple University and Public Radio Stations in the South Region to create a 24-Hour radio broadcast of the "Round The Clock Radio Challenge", where each station took turns to host programmes in a shared network under the name of "South Region". This was to raise some money for chosen charities in the South.

As of the end of February 2024, full 24-hour 7 days-a-week broadcasts had resumed for the first time in four years. Plans for dedicated music shows, podcasts, sports and news broadcasts among others will be returning to the station. Podcasts have also being recorded on various topics by Student Members and are kept on the Website Radio Player.

== Committee 2023/2024 ==
The Radio Station is run by the Student Volunteer Committee and members of the Pure FM University Society which is registered under the Portsmouth Student Union.

- President/Executive Director: Charlotte Lord
- Vice President/HR Director/Treasurer: Samuel Aries
- Station Manager/Secretary: Joe Levy
- Music Director: Daniel Hatfield
- Technical Director: Thomas Boxall
- Programming Director: Jayden Henry
- News and Sport Lead: Stephen Pinhorne
- Social and Outreach Director: Freya Anderson

== Awards and nominations ==
In 2008 at the Student Radio Association Conference in Bath, Ben Burrell won the first Demo Idol.

In 2012, Dan Jackson and Murray Grindon were shortlisted for the Best Entertainment Programming category at the Student Radio Awards.

In April 2013 at the Student Radio Association Conference in Leicester, Glen Scott picked up Volunteer of the Year at the I Love Student Radio Awards.

In November 2013, Glen Scott picked up the Gold Award for Best Male Presenter at the National Student Radio Awards 2013.

In 2014 at the National Student Radio Awards, Pure FM picked up their first group Gold Award for Best SRA Chart Show (presented by Glen Scott and Oliver Ing, produced by Ed Roberts).

In 2015, at the National Student Radio Awards Pure FM were shortlisted for Best SRA Chart Show (presented by Orion Brooks and Andrew Dixson, produced by Kerrie Oak and Alex Watson).

In 2016, Pure FM were nominated for "Most Improved Student Radio Station" at the I Love Student Radio Awards. Deputy Head of Music, Nelson Hylton, was also nominated for Outstanding Contribution to Student Radio.

At the National Student Radio Awards in November 2023, a programme that was broadcast during the Round the Clock Radio Challenge named "The Big Music Quiz" was awarded the Silver Award for Best Multiplatform Initiative by the Student Radio Association and the award is shared by all radio stations that were involved.

== See also ==
- Student Radio Association
- Student Radio Awards
