= Aśuddhatā =

Aśuddhatā, (Sanskrit: अशुद्धता, Aśuddhatā, lit. means "impurity") is a term most often used by Hindus in South Asia, means ritual impurity or uncleanness. Hindus believe in a duality of purity and impurity. They think that people are both pure and impure and they understand that a person cannot be entirely one or the other. While impurity has a negative connotation, “impurities are thought to be part of everyday life and all humans alternate between relative purity (suddhatā) and relative impurity (aśuddhatā). It is therefore best that these impurities be avoided as much as possible.

Chõyāchũyi is a form of aśuddhatā. It can be defined as “mutual touching”, which is essentially any form of contact between two people whether it be intentional or unintentional. In addition to being defined as contact between two people, chõyāchũyi also occurs when “two people touch an object at the same time…or when two people sit on the same bench or mat at the same time”. While seemingly unavoidable, Hindus have found a way around becoming impure through “mutual touching”—they simply avoid contact. If a person needs something that another person has in their possession, instead of handing the object directly to the person in need, they “place an object on the ground for the other to pick up” or they drop it into the other's hand.

Ucchishta is another form of aśuddhatā. It is described as “a term that refers specifically to food items that have become very highly permeated with the substance of those who have cooked, handled, and eaten them”. It is acceptable for close family members to eat the other's leftover food, however, there are some relationships that are one-sided. For example, a servant can eat an employer's eto food, but the employer cannot eat the servant's eto food. This is because an employer is of higher status than a servant and does not want to be polluted by the servant's lower status.
