= List of ONS built-up areas in England by population =

Statistical areas of England

This list of built-up areas for England was compiled by the Office for National Statistics (ONS) after the 2021 UK Census. Built-up area boundaries are defined and named by the ONS and do not necessarily coincide with other definitions that use the same names. These correspond to the meso-scaled 2011 census "built-up sub-areas". As of May 2026, ONS has not defined a new nomenclature for each of the macro-scaled 2021 built-up areas (2001 urban areas) released any data for them. For its reports on the 2021 Census, the ONS uses the term "Amalgamated Built-up Area" for the macro-scale but assigns numbers rather than a names for them.

== Classifications ==
Population range	BUA classed as	Approximate settlement type
200,000+	major	cities
75,000–199,999	large	large towns or smaller cities
20,000–74,999	medium	medium towns
5,000–19,999	small	larger village or small town
0–4,999	minor	hamlet or village or small charter town

== Major ==
Location of major BUAs in England

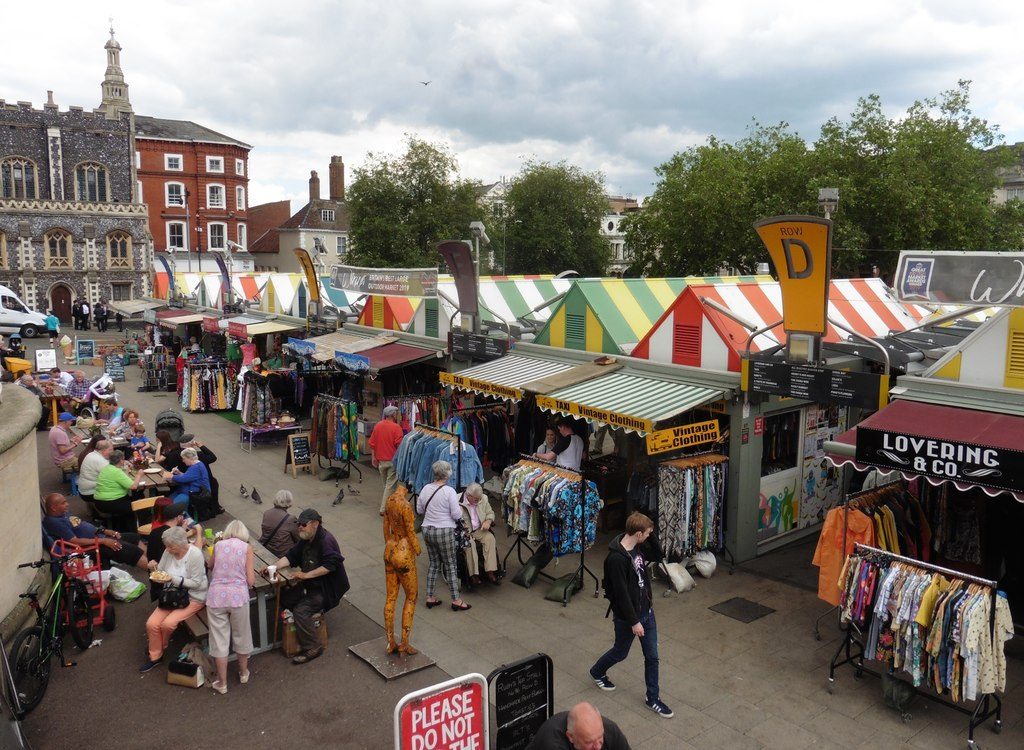
Norwich

The ONS has classified all built-up areas with a population of at least 200,000 as "major". Most are cities, with three large towns (Luton, Northampton and Reading) included. Conversely, there are many settlements that have city status but do not reach the threshold.

#	Built-up area	2021 Population		County	Examples of places included in these areas
#	Built-up area	ONS	City population	County	Examples of places included in these areas
1	London	—N/a	8,776,535	Greater London; City of London	The West End; Knightsbridge; Bromley; Canary Wharf; Croydon; Ealing; Harrow; Hounslow; Ilford; Kingston; Romford; Shepherd's Bush; Stratford; Sutton; Uxbridge; Wood Green
2	Birmingham	1,121,375	1,121,408	West Midlands	Birmingham city centre; Aston; Bournville; Edgbaston; Small Heath
3	Leeds	536,280	536,321	West Yorkshire	Leeds city centre; Beeston; Headingley; Holbeck; Roundhay
4	Liverpool	506,565	506,552	Merseyside	Liverpool city centre; Anfield; Everton; Speke; West Derby; Woolton
5	Sheffield	500,535	500,552	South Yorkshire	Sheffield city centre; Broomhall; Crookes; Hillsborough; Owlerton; Longley
6	Manchester	470,405	470,411	Greater Manchester	Manchester city centre; Ardwick; Chorlton; Cheetham; Longsight; Rusholme
7	Bristol	425,215	425,232	Bristol	Bristol city centre; Bishopston; Clifton; Easton; Fishponds; Redland
8	Leicester	406,580	406,588	Leicestershire	Leicester city centre; Aylestone; Clarendon Park; New Parks; Westcotes
9	Coventry	344,285	344,322	West Midlands	Coventry city centre; Bell Green; Holbrooks; Earlsdon; Radford; Tile Hill
10	Bradford	333,950	333,931	West Yorkshire	Bradford city centre; Barkerend; Odsal; Bierley; Eccleshill
11	Nottingham	299,790	299,797	Nottinghamshire	Nottingham city centre; Sherwood; Lenton; Sneinton; Wollaton
12	Newcastle upon Tyne	286,445	286,468	Tyne and Wear	Newcastle city centre; Benwell; Byker; Gosforth; Jesmond
13	Brighton and Hove	277,105	277,106	East Sussex	Brighton; Hove; Patcham; Preston; Portslade
14	Derby	275,575	275,599	Derbyshire	Derby city centre; Alvaston; Chaddesden; Darley Abbey; Littleover; Mickleover
15	Kingston upon Hull	270,810	270,806	East Riding of Yorkshire	Hull city centre; Bransholme; Sculcoates; Sutton; The Avenues
16	Plymouth	266,955	266,983	Devon	Barbican; Devonport; Plymstock; Stoke; St Budeaux
17	Milton Keynes	264,349 (Note: The ONS has used the name "Milton Keynes" for a sub-area of the city, being the remainder of its total built-up area after subtracting Bletchley, Newport Pagnell and Woburn Sands (which it had included in previous definitions of the urban area). In Table 4A in the Supplementary Tables of its 2021 Rural Urban Classification, the ONS defines an "Amalgamated Built-up Area" that is numbered (2987) but not named, which corresponds to the Milton Keynes urban area.)	264,349	Buckinghamshire	Central Milton Keynes; Bletchley; Fenny Stratford; Newport Pagnell; Stony Stratford; Woburn Sands; Wolverton
18	Stoke-on-Trent	260,560	260,602	Staffordshire	Hanley; Stoke; Burslem; Longton; Tunstall
19	Southampton	249,620	249,604	Hampshire	Southampton City Centre; Bitterne; Portswood; Shirley; Woolston
20	Northampton	243,520	243,511	Northamptonshire	Northampton Town Centre; Abington; Duston; Far Cotton; Kingsthorpe
21	Wolverhampton	234,025	234,015	West Midlands	Wolverhampton city centre; Aldersley; Blakenhall; Bradmore; Fallings Park
22	Luton	233,525	233,498	Bedfordshire	Luton town centre; Biscot; Farley Hill; Limbury; Warden Hill
23	Portsmouth	223,305	223,312	Hampshire	Old Portsmouth; Southsea; Cosham; North End; Drayton
24	Reading	203,795	203,808	Berkshire	Reading town centre; Coley; Whitley; Newtown; Southcote
25	Norwich	200,770	200,752	Norfolk	Norwich Over the Water; Thorpe Hamlet; Bowthorpe; Eaton; Mile Cross

== Large ==
Location of large BUAs in England down to Crawley

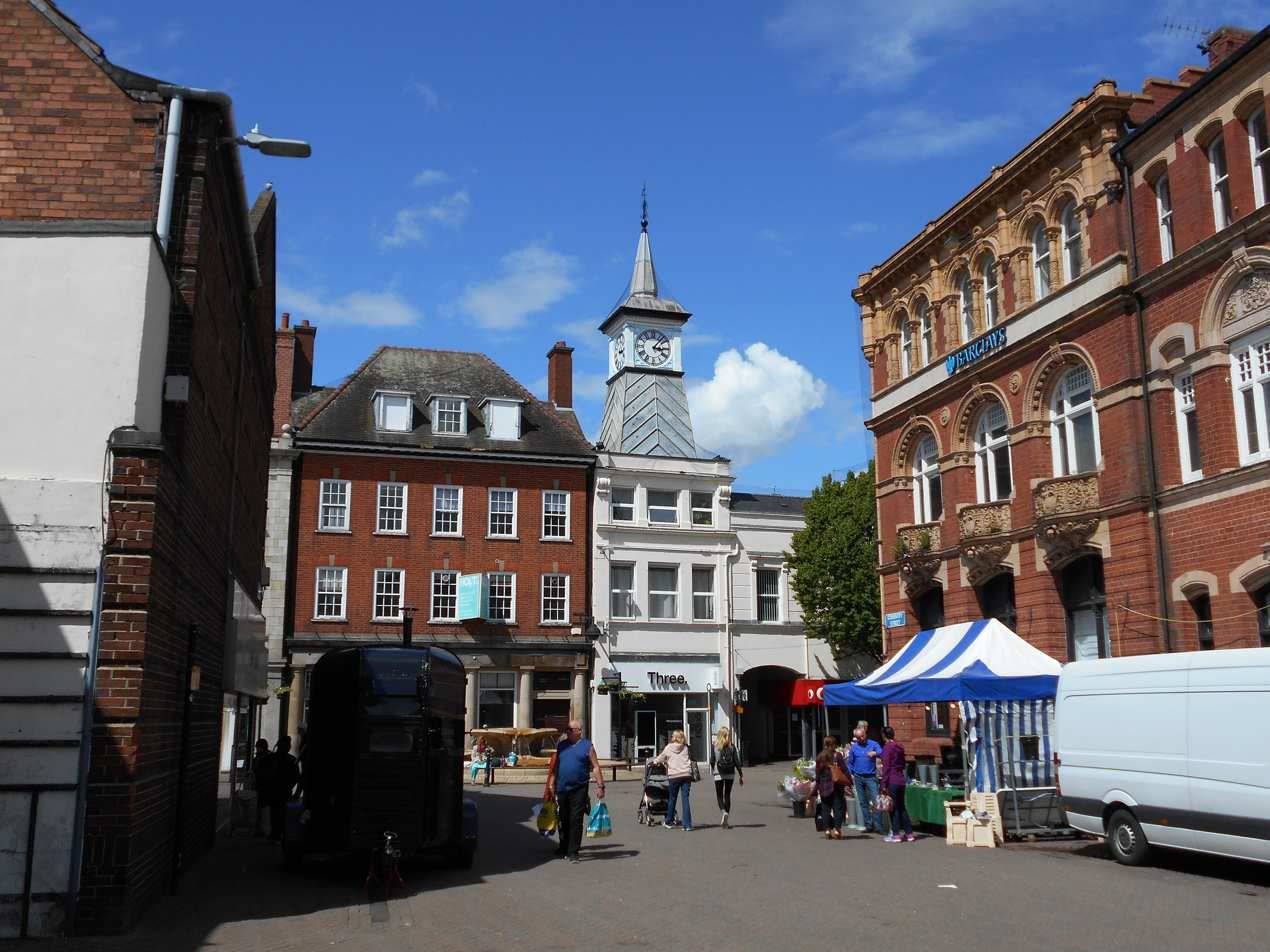
Nuneaton

The ONS classified all built-up areas between 199,999 and 75,000 as large-sized, most include large towns or smaller cities.

#	Built-up area	2021 Population		County	Related places
#	Built-up area	ONS	Citypopulation	County	Related places
26	Bournemouth	196,455	196,445	Dorset	Bournemouth Town Centre; Boscombe; Southbourne; Westbourne; Winton
27	Peterborough	190,605	190,584	Cambridgeshire	Peterborough city centre; Dogsthorpe; Fletton; Hampton; Orton
28	Bolton	184,090	184,073	Greater Manchester	Bolton town centre; Great Lever; Heaton; Sharples; Tonge
29	Swindon	183,680	183,638	Wiltshire	Swindon old town; Freshbrook; Rodbourne; Haydon Wick; Covingham; West Swindon
30	Southend-on-Sea	182,305	182,287	Essex	Southend city centre; Prittlewell; Eastwood; Westcliff-on-Sea; Southchurch
31	Warrington	174,970	174,954	Cheshire	Warrington town centre; Bewsey; Cinnamon Brow; Bruche; Orford
32	Oxford	170,805	170,798	Oxfordshire	Oxford city centre; Cowley; Headington; Osney; North Oxford
33	Sunderland	168,315	168,277	Tyne and Wear	Sunderland City Centre; Roker; Pallion; North Hylton; Monkwearmouth
34	Slough	166,855	166,877	Berkshire	Slough town centre; Langley; Chalvey; Britwell; Cippenham
35	Kingswood and Fishponds	160,270	160,260	Gloucestershire and Bristol	Kingswood; Fishponds; Downend; Cadbury Heath; Hanham
36	Telford	156,910	156,896	Shropshire	Telford town centre; Dawley; Oakengates; Wellington; Madeley
37	Cambridge	152,740	152,725	Cambridgeshire	Cambridge City Centre; Arbury; Cherry Hinton; Chesterton; Newnham
38	Ipswich	151,565	151,562	Suffolk	Ipswich town centre; Stoke; Ravenswood; Maidenhall; Chantry
39	Blackpool	149,070	149,056	Lancashire	Blackpool town centre; South Shore; Marton; Layton; Bispham
40	Middlesbrough	148,215	148,219	North Yorkshire	Middlehaven; Linthorpe; Marton; Acklam; Coulby Newham
41	York	141,685	141,671	North Yorkshire	York city centre; Acomb; Clifton; Heworth; Dringhouses
42	Huddersfield	141,675	141,692	West Yorkshire	Huddersfield town centre; Birkby; Lindley; Quarmby; Moldgreen
43	Poole	141,005	140,977	Dorset	Poole Town Centre; Sandbanks; Lilliput; Parkstone; Hamworthy; Oakdale
44	Watford	131,325	131,326	Hertfordshire	Watford town Centre; North Watford; Cassiobury; Oxhey; Leavesden
45	Colchester	130,245	130,248	Essex	Colchester city centre; Abbey Field; Lexden; Myland; Old Heath
46	Exeter	126,175	126,156	Devon	Exeter City Centre; Exeter Quay; Alphington; Heavitree; Exwick
47	Blackburn	124,955	124,983	Lancashire	Blackburn town Centre; Little Harwood; Feniscowles; Mill Hill; Beardwood
48	Crawley	120,550	120,549	West Sussex	Crawley town Centre; Three Bridges; Langley Green; Pound Hill; Broadfield
49	Gloucester	118,555	118,541	Gloucestershire	Gloucester City Centre; Hempsted; Barnwood; Podsmead; Hucclecote
50	Stockport	117,935	117,941	Greater Manchester	Stockport town Centre; Underbank; Offerton
51	Basingstoke	117,210	117,207	Hampshire	Basingstoke town Centre; Lychpit; Winklebury; Kempshott
52	Basildon	115,955	115,964	Essex	Basildon town Centre; Vange; Pitsea; Laindon
53	Cheltenham	115,940	115,959	Gloucestershire	Cheltenham town Centre; Up Hatherley; Arle; Whaddon; Pittville
54	Gateshead	115,280	115,316	Tyne and Wear	Gateshead town Centre; Wrekenton; Dunston; Pelaw; Deckham
55	Worthing	111,620	111,621	West Sussex	Worthing town Centre; Goring-by-Sea; Durrington; Salvington; West Worthing
56	Rochdale	111,255	111,261	Greater Manchester	Rochdale town Centre; Shawclough; Wardleworth; Spotland
57	Oldham	110,720	110,718	Greater Manchester	Oldham town Centre; Derker; Werneth; Limeside; Copster Hill; Coppice
58	Chelmsford	110,625	110,606	Essex	Chelmsford city Centre; Springfield; Chelmer Village; Moulsham
59	Birkenhead	109,835	109,848	Merseyside	Birkenhead town Centre; Oxton; Claughton; Tranmere; Noctorum
60	Maidstone	109,490	109,490	Kent	Maidstone town Centre; Tovil; Barming Heath; Shepway; Ringlestone
61	Gillingham	108,480	108,483	Kent	Gillingham town Centre; Twydall; Brompton; Wigmore; Rainham
62	Salford	108,410	108,409	Greater Manchester	Salford city Centre; Salford Quays; Ordsall; Pendleton; Irlams o' th' Height
63	Solihull	107,735	107,728	West Midlands	Solihull town Centre; Elmdon Heath; Olton
64	St Helens	107,680	107,677	Merseyside	St Helens town Centre; Eccleston; Ravenhead; Sutton
65	Worcester	105,465	105,455	Worcestershire	Worcester city Centre; Diglis; Ronkswood; Henwick; Northwick
66	Lincoln	104,555	104,565	Lincolnshire	Lincoln City Centre; Birchwood; Boultham; Bracebridge
67	West Bromwich	103,110	103,112	West Midlands	West Brom town centre; Lyng; Stone Cross
68	Eastbourne	99,180	99,189	East Sussex	Eastbourne town centre; Meads; Langney; Hampden Park
69	Wakefield	97,870	97,852	West Yorkshire	Wakefield city Centre; Agbrigg; Sandal Magna; Flanshaw; Alverthorpe
70	Wythenshawe	97,660	97,635	Greater Manchester	Wythenshawe town centre; Northenden; Baguley; Newall Green
71	Bedford	97,235	97,241	Bedfordshire	Bedford town centre; Fenlake; Putnoe
72	Hemel Hempstead	95,985	95,961	Hertfordshire	Hemel Hempstead old town; Gadebridge; Boxmoor; Bennetts End; Adeyfield
73	Preston	94,490	94,508	Lancashire	Preston town centre; Ashton-on-Ribble; Plungington; Ribbleton; Deepdale; Avenham
74	Stevenage	94,470	94,456	Hertfordshire	Stevenage town centre; Symonds Green; Shephall
75	Southport	94,440	94,421	Merseyside	Southport town centre; Birkdale; Crossens; Churchtown
76	Bath	94,080	94,092	Somerset	Bath city centre; Lansdown; Walcot; Twerton; Combe Down
77	Harlow	93,580	93,566	Essex	Old Harlow; Passmores; Church Langley; Great Parndon; Newhall
78	Royal Sutton Coldfield	93,375	93,369	West Midlands	Sutton town centre; Falcon Lodge; Boldmere; Walmley; Streetly
79	Darlington	93,015	93,037	County Durham	Darlington town centre; Cockerton; Blackwell; Haughton-le-Skerne; Firthmoor
80	Chester	92,760	92,742	Cheshire	Chester city centre; Blacon; Upton; Hoole; Handbridge
81	Hastings	91,490	91,480	East Sussex	Hastings Old Town; St Leonards-on-Sea; Ore; Hollington; Silverhill
82	Nuneaton	88,815	88,813	Warwickshire	Nuneaton town centre; Whitestone; Stockingford; Weddington
83	Halifax	88,115	88,109	West Yorkshire	Halifax town centre; Ovenden; Boothtown; Skircoat Green
84	Hartlepool	87,995	87,984	County Durham	The Headland; Stranton; Owton; Seaton Carew; Throston
85	Aylesbury	87,950	87,967	Buckinghamshire	Aylesbury town centre; Elmhurst; Queens Park; Fairford Leys; Southcourt
86	Doncaster	87,455	87,457	South Yorkshire	Doncaster city centre; Bessacarr; Lakeside; Balby; Hexthorpe
87	Grimsby	85,925	85,911	Lincolnshire	Grimsby town centre; Little Coates; Nunsthorpe; Scartho; West Marsh
88	Wallasey	85,610	85,611	Merseyside	Wallasey town centre; New Brighton; Liscard; Poulton; Egremont
89	Stockton-on-Tees	84,815	84,801	County Durham	Stockton town centre; Norton; Hardwick; Hartburn; Roseworth
90	Weston-super-Mare	84,605	84,628	Somerset	Weston town centre; St. Georges; Worle; Uphill
91	High Wycombe	83,535	83,523	Buckinghamshire	Wycombe town centre; Booker; Wycombe Marsh
92	Ashford	82,140	82,164	Kent	Ashford town centre; Singleton; Sevington
93	Redditch	81,635	81,637	Worcestershire	Redditch town centre; Callow Hill; Crabbs Cross
94	Wigan	81,580	81,557	Greater Manchester	Wigan town centre; Scholes; Goose Green; Pemberton
95	Scunthorpe	81,265	81,286	Lincolnshire	Scunthorpe town centre; Frodingham; Yaddlethorpe; Crosby
96	Bury	81,095	81,101	Greater Manchester	Bury town centre; Fishpool; Jericho; Elton
97	Bracknell	78,675	78,660	Berkshire	Bracknell town centre; Easthampstead; Great Hollands; Crown Wood
98	Burnley	78,255	78,270	Lancashire	Burnley town centre; Burnley Wood; Ightenhill; Stoneyholme
99	Rugby	78,120	78,117	Warwickshire	Rugby town centre; Overslade; Hillmorton; Brownsover
100	Guildford	77,880	77,854	Surrey	Guildford town centre; Merrow; Burpham
101	Carlisle	77,730	77,728	Cumbria	Carlisle town centre; Denton Holme; Botcherby; Stanwix; Raffles
102	Chatham	76,955	76,983	Kent	Chatham town centre; Walderslade
103	Newcastle-under-Lyme	76,505	76,503	Staffordshire	Newcastle town centre; Bradwell; Chesterton; Wolstanton
104	Chesterfield	76,420	76,402	Derbyshire	Chesterfield town centre; Walderslade; Boythorpe
105	Burton upon Trent	76,255	76,270	Staffordshire	Burton town centre; Winshill; Horninglow
106	Tamworth	76,090	76,092	Staffordshire	Tamworth town centre; Amington; Stonydelph; Wilnecote
107	Shrewsbury	76,015	75,992	Shropshire	Shrewsbury town centre; Ditherington; Kingsland; Radbrook
108	Woking	75,660	75,666	Surrey	Woking town centre; Maybury; Horsell; Sheerwater
109	St Albans	75,540	75,537	Hertfordshire	St Albans city centre; Marshalswick
110	Harrogate	75,515	75,507	North Yorkshire	Harrogate town centre; Bilton; Oatlands; Starbeck

== Medium ==
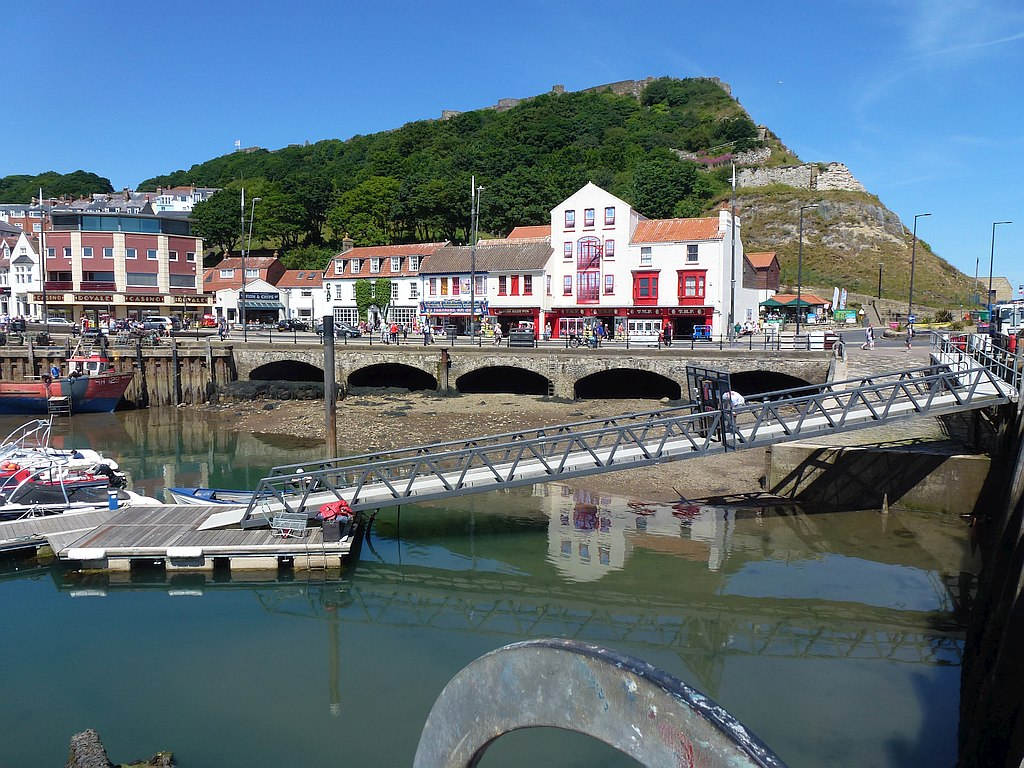
Scarborough

The ONS classified all built-up areas between 75,000 and 20,000 as medium-sized, most are moderate towns with some exceptional cities or villages.

=== 49,700 to 74,999 ===
Hereford, Canterbury, Lancaster and Durham have city status, all others are towns and Rochester formerly had city status.

#	Built-up area	2021 Population		County
#	Built-up area	ONS	Citypopulation	County
111	Crewe	74,120	74,123	Cheshire
112	South Shields	73,345	73,325	Tyne and Wear
113	Stafford	71,690	71,673	Staffordshire
114	Rotherham	71,535	71,542	South Yorkshire
115	Barnsley	71,405	71,422	South Yorkshire
116	Lowestoft	71,315	71,327	Suffolk
117	Walsall	70,775	70,778	West Midlands
118	Gosport	70,110	70,131	Hampshire
119	Dartford	69,130	69,134	Kent
120	Bognor Regis	68,435	68,408	West Sussex
121	Corby	68,160	68,164	Northamptonshire
122	Paignton	67,520	67,488	Devon
123	Maidenhead	67,375	67,374	Berkshire
124	Rochester	67,285	67,274	Kent
125	Ellesmere Port	65,430	65,421	Cheshire
126	Loughborough	64,860	64,884	Leicester
127	Dudley	64,270	64,275	West Midlands
128	Dewsbury	63,720	63,722	West Yorkshire
129	Mansfield	63,445	63,438	Nottinghamshire
130	Margate	63,320	63,322	Kent
131	Kettering	63,150	63,144	Northamptonshire
132	Cannock	63,065	63,054	Staffordshire
133	Sale	62,550	62,547	Greater Manchester
134	Taunton	61,665	61,674	Somerset
135	Runcorn	61,645	61,635	Cheshire
136	Farnborough	60,655	60,652	Hampshire
137	Tynemouth	60,605	60,600	Tyne and Wear
138	Hereford	60,480	60,475	Herefordshire
139	Halesowen	60,110	60,097	West Midlands
140	Widnes	59,935	59,939	Cheshire
141	Huyton with Roby	59,845	59,846	Merseyside
142	Scarborough	59,505	59,497	North Yorkshire
143	Gravesend	58,105	58,102	Kent
144	Bebington	57,600	57,597	Merseyside
145	Kidderminster	57,560	57,553	Worcestershire
146	Stourbridge	56,950	56,935	West Midlands
147	Smethwick	56,340	56,338	West Midlands
148	Weymouth	55,535	55,543	Dorset
149	Brentwood	55,340	55,358	Essex
150	Barrow-in-Furness	55,255	55,251	Cumbria
151	Canterbury	55,090	55,087	Kent
152	Wellingborough	54,425	54,412	Northamptonshire
153	Sittingbourne	54,390	54,392	Kent
154	Macclesfield	54,345	54,340	Cheshire
155	Bootle	53,720	53,718	Merseyside
156	Carlton	53,555	53,555	Nottinghamshire
157	Clacton-on-Sea	53,200	53,208	Essex
158	Lancaster	52,655	52,660	Lancashire
159	Beeston	52,355	52,356	Nottinghamshire
160	Banbury	52,045	52,052	Oxfordshire
161	Torquay	52,035	52,037	Devon
162	Folkestone	51,995	51,991	Kent
163	Kingswinford	51,910	51,904	West Midlands
164	Bloxwich	51,875	51,879	West Midlands
165	Welwyn Garden City	51,505	51,524	Hertfordshire
166	Washington	51,320	51,312	Tyne and Wear
167	Royal Leamington Spa	51,310	51,323	Warwickshire
168	Royal Tunbridge Wells	51,220	51,232	Kent
169	Hinckley	50,725	50,712	Leicestershire
170	Durham	50,510	50,515	County Durham
171	Wokingham	50,325	50,320	Berkshire
172	Crosby	50,215	50,213	Merseyside
173	Horsham	50,215	50,223	West Sussex
174	Yeovil	50,170	50,176	Somerset
175	Thundersley and South Benfleet	49,885	49,881	Essex

=== 30,000 to 49,699 ===
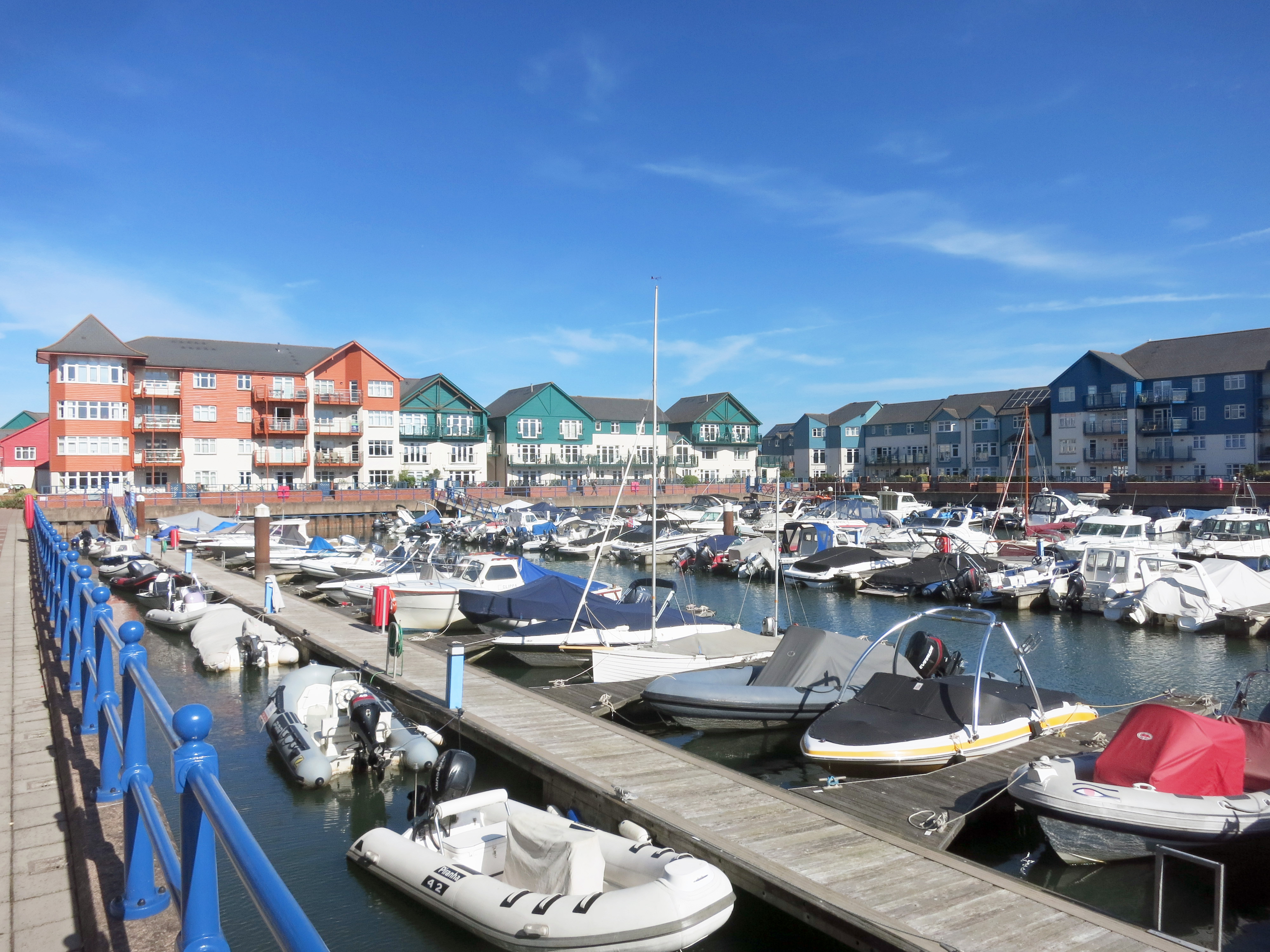
Exmouth

Winchester, Salisbury, Lichfield and Chichester have city status between 30,000 and 49,700.

#	BUA	2021 Pop.	County
176	Altrincham	49,680	Greater Manchester
177	Willenhall	49,580	West Midlands
178	Christchurch	48,985	Dorset
179	Keighley	48,750	West Yorkshire
180	Ashton-under-Lyne	48,600	Greater Manchester
181	Andover	48,480	Hampshire
182	Winchester	48,480	Hampshire
183	Eastleigh	48,360	Hampshire
184	Bridgwater	47,860	Somerset
185	Salisbury	47,690	Wiltshire
186	King's Lynn	47,615	Norfolk
187	Tipton	47,200	West Midlands
188	West Molesey	47,150	Surrey
189	Havant	46,960	Hampshire
190	Middleton	46,630	Greater Manchester
191	Kirkby	45,560	Merseyside
192	Leigh	45,495	Greater Manchester
193	Castleford	45,355	West Yorkshire
194	Wallsend	45,355	Tyne and Wear
195	Boston	45,340	Lincolnshire
196	Oldbury	45,180	West Midlands
197	Bletchley	45,010	Buckinghamshire
198	Grantham	44,905	Lincolnshire
199	Batley	44,500	West Yorkshire
200	Grays	44,345	Essex
201	Bexhill-on-Sea	43,755	East Sussex
202	Trowbridge	43,750	Wiltshire
203	Cheshunt	43,680	Hertfordshire
204	Worksop	43,440	Nottinghamshire
205	Braintree	43,190	Essex
206	Leighton Buzzard	42,735	Bedfordshire
207	Lytham St Anne's	42,695	Lancashire
208	Fareham	42,625	Hampshire
209	Newbury	42,260	Berkshire
210	Ramsgate	42,030	Kent
211	Urmston	41,740	Greater Manchester
212	Hatfield	41,560	Hertfordshire
213	Bury St Edmunds	41,280	Suffolk
214	Eccles	41,125	Greater Manchester
215	Bishop's Stortford	40,915	Hertfordshire
216	Hoddesdon	40,615	Hertfordshire
217	Bamber Bridge	40,360	Lancashire
218	Haywards Heath	40,185	West Sussex
219	Arnold	40,010	Nottinghamshire
220	Aldershot	39,825	Hampshire
221	Borehamwood	39,765	Hertfordshire
222	Blyth	39,730	Northumberland
223	Chorley	39,535	Lancashire
224	Leyland	39,295	Lancashire
225	Prescot	39,225	Merseyside
226	Rowley Regis	39,050	West Midlands
227	Ilkeston	38,725	Derbyshire
228	Canvey Island	38,010	Essex
229	Long Eaton	37,820	Derbyshire
230	Fleet	37,790	Hampshire
231	Bicester	37,755	Oxfordshire
232	Redcar	37,660	North Yorkshire
233	Chadderton	37,610	Greater Manchester
234	Whitley Bay	36,880	Tyne and Wear
235	Camberley	36,785	Surrey
236	Warwick	36,680	Warwickshire
237	West Bridgford	36,490	Nottinghamshire
238	Sutton in Ashfield	36,425	Nottinghamshire
239	Dover	36,360	Kent
240	Tonbridge	36,125	Kent
241	Chippenham	36,090	Wiltshire
242	Denton	35,995	Greater Manchester
243	Hyde	35,895	Greater Manchester
244	Epsom	35,850	Surrey
245	Hucknall	35,840	Nottinghamshire
246	Locks Heath	35,755	Hampshire
247	Exmouth	35,500	Devon
248	Hitchin	35,220	Hertfordshire
249	Skelmersdale	34,915	Lancashire
250	Accrington	34,895	Lancashire
251	Pudsey	34,850	West Yorkshire
252	Bridlington	34,845	East Riding of Yorkshire
253	Waterlooville	34,775	Hampshire
254	Bromsgrove	34,755	Worcestershire
255	Wigston	34,730	Leicestershire
256	Fulwood	34,690	Lancashire
257	Bilston	34,640	West Midlands
258	Didcot	34,600	Oxfordshire
259	Swadlincote	34,565	Derbyshire
260	Dunstable	34,500	Bedfordshire
261	Billericay	34,075	Essex
262	Horndean	34,050	Hampshire
263	Letchworth Garden City	33,990	Hertfordshire
264	Billingham	33,920	County Durham
265	Rustington	33,885	West Sussex
266	Nelson	33,805	Lancashire
267	Burgess Hill	33,355	West Sussex
268	Loughton	33,345	Essex
269	St Neots	33,265	Cambridgeshire
270	Great Malvern	33,185	Worcestershire
271	Abingdon-on-Thames	33,175	Oxfordshire
272	Brighouse	33,160	West Yorkshire
273	Caversham	33,040	Berkshire
274	New Haw, West Byfleet and Sheerwater	33,035	Surrey
275	Pontefract	32,975	West Yorkshire
276	Morecambe	32,750	Lancashire
277	Lichfield	32,580	Staffordshire
278	Morley	32,550	West Yorkshire
279	Winsford	32,530	Cheshire
280	Redhill	32,525	Surrey
281	Rayleigh	32,380	Essex
282	Brierley Hill	32,305	West Midlands
283	Whitstable	32,195	Kent
284	Sedgley	31,990	West Midlands
285	Chandler's Ford	31,975	Hampshire
286	Chichester	31,710	West Sussex
287	Rushden	31,685	Northamptonshire
288	Windsor	31,560	Berkshire
289	Prestwich	31,495	Greater Manchester
290	Barnstaple	31,275	Devon
291	Radcliffe	31,115	Greater Manchester
292	Bedworth	31,090	Warwickshire
293	Harpenden	30,965	Hertfordshire
294	Beverley	30,930	East Riding of Yorkshire
295	Spalding	30,550	Lincolnshire
296	Witney	30,165	Oxfordshire
297	Congleton	30,005	Cheshire

=== 20,000 to 29,999 ===
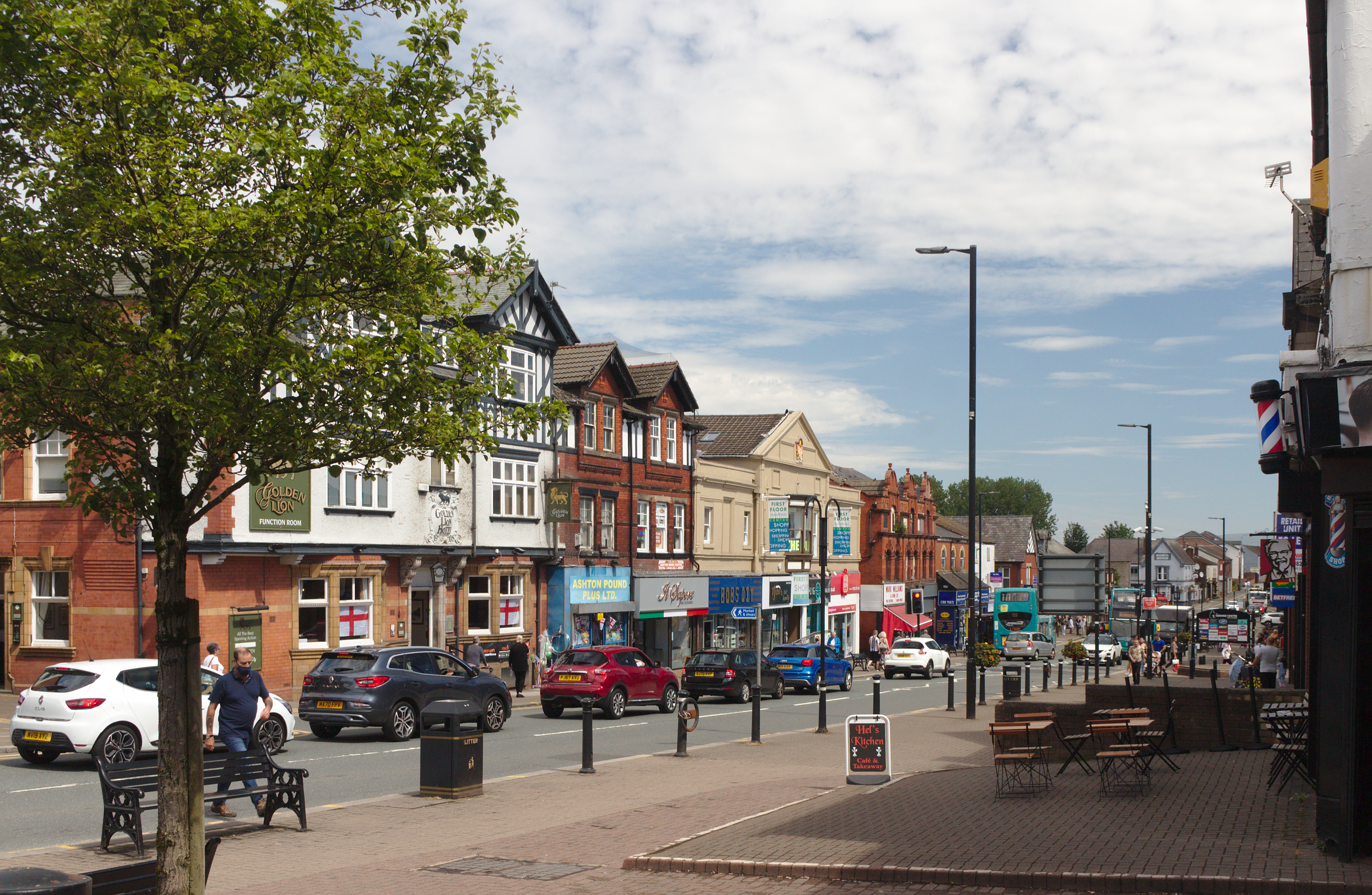
Ashton-in-Makerfield

Truro officially has city status.

#	BUA	2021 Pop.	County
298	Northfleet	29,900	Kent
299	Consett	29,885	County Durham
300	Newark-on-Trent	29,755	Nottinghamshire
301	Heywood	29,725	Greater Manchester
302	Cleethorpes	29,670	Lincolnshire
303	Newton Abbot	29,650	Devon
304	Eston	29,635	North Yorkshire
305	Stanford-le-Hope	29,525	Essex
306	Jarrow	29,470	Tyne and Wear
307	Shipley	29,225	West Yorkshire
308	Heswall	29,075	Merseyside
309	Deal	28,985	Kent
310	Great Yarmouth	28,985	Norfolk
311	Kendal	28,940	Cumbria
312	Cramlington	28,845	Northumberland
313	Hertford	28,800	Hertfordshire
314	Farnworth	28,760	Greater Manchester
315	Bushey	28,425	Hertfordshire
316	Yate	28,350	Gloucestershire
317	Ashington	28,280	Northumberland
318	Evesham	28,250	Worcestershire
319	Stratford-upon-Avon	28,120	Warwickshire
320	Totton	28,090	Hampshire
321	Woodley	28,025	Berkshire
322	Stretford	28,015	Greater Manchester
323	Egham	28,000	Surrey
324	Lancing and Sompting	27,930	West Sussex
325	Frome	27,905	Somerset
326	Burntwood	27,900	Staffordshire
327	Darwen	27,900	Lancashire
328	Daventry	27,790	Northamptonshire
329	Ormskirk	27,715	Lancashire
330	Atherton	27,575	Greater Manchester
331	Wickford	27,535	Essex
332	Ewell	27,515	Surrey
333	Melton Mowbray	27,450	Leicestershire
334	Witham	27,395	Essex
335	Tadworth and Epsom Downs	27,095	Surrey
336	Horley	27,070	Surrey
337	Walton-on-Thames	27,020	Surrey
338	Longbenton	26,880	Tyne and Wear
339	Stalybridge	26,830	Greater Manchester
340	Wisbech	26,795	Cambridgeshire
341	Haverhill	26,705	Suffolk
342	Sevenoaks	26,475	Kent
343	Droitwich Spa	26,420	Worcestershire
344	Ashton-in-Makerfield	26,375	Greater Manchester
345	Portishead	26,355	Somerset
346	East Grinstead	26,350	West Sussex
347	Rickmansworth	26,290	Hertfordshire
348	Fleetwood	26,225	Lancashire
349	Larkfield	26,150	Kent
350	Rugeley	26,145	Staffordshire
351	Stroud	26,080	Gloucestershire
352	Little Hulton	25,825	Greater Manchester
353	Broadstairs	25,775	Kent
354	Newton Aycliffe	25,765	County Durham
355	Wilmslow	25,725	Cheshire
356	Huntingdon	25,600	Cambridgeshire
357	Golborne	25,555	Greater Manchester
358	Thatcham	25,550	Berkshire
359	Thetford	25,510	Norfolk
360	Newport	25,405	Isle of Wight
361	Coseley	25,205	West Midlands
362	Bradley Stoke	25,200	Gloucestershire
363	Herne Bay	24,870	Kent
364	Cheadle Hulme	24,785	Greater Manchester
365	Wickersley and Bramley	24,655	South Yorkshire
366	Newton-le-Willows	24,650	Merseyside
367	Newquay	24,545	Cornwall
368	Hindley	24,490	Greater Manchester
369	Gorleston-on-Sea	24,470	Norfolk
370	St Austell	24,360	Cornwall
371	Lee-on-the-Solent	24,315	Hampshire
372	Ash and Ash Vale	24,285	Surrey
373	Heanor	24,260	Derbyshire
374	Felixstowe	24,220	Suffolk
375	Market Harborough	24,165	Leicestershire
376	Ryde	24,105	Isle of Wight
377	Falmouth	24,070	Cornwall
378	Oadby	24,030	Leicestershire
379	Ascot	23,995	Berkshire
380	Sudbury	23,920	Suffolk
381	Droylsden	23,915	Greater Manchester
382	Seaford	23,865	East Sussex
383	Reigate	23,780	Surrey
384	Retford	23,740	Nottinghamshire
385	Chesham	23,695	Buckinghamshire
386	Rawtenstall	23,680	Lancashire
387	Shoreham-by-Sea	23,660	West Sussex
388	Chafford Hundred and West Thurrock	23,585	Essex
389	Chester-le-Street	23,560	County Durham
390	Orrell	23,410	Greater Manchester
391	Potters Bar	23,400	Hertfordshire
392	Ingleby Barwick	23,380	North Yorkshire
393	Maldon	23,380	Essex
394	Bishop Auckland	23,355	County Durham
395	Thornaby-on-Tees	23,350	North Yorkshire
396	Hedge End	23,190	Hampshire
397	Truro	23,060	Cornwall
398	Royton	22,990	Greater Manchester
399	Whitehaven	22,945	Cumbria
400	Clifton	22,935	Nottinghamshire
401	Formby	22,890	Merseyside
402	Swinton	22,885	Greater Manchester
403	Ashford	22,825	Surrey
404	Kempston	22,785	Bedfordshire
405	Caterham	22,755	Surrey
406	Hailsham	22,550	East Sussex
407	South Ockendon	22,440	Essex
408	Kenilworth	22,235	Warwickshire
409	Reddish	22,200	Greater Manchester
410	Whitefield	22,185	Greater Manchester
411	Chapeltown and High Green	22,180	South Yorkshire
412	Crowborough	21,990	East Sussex
413	Coalville	21,980	Leicestershire
414	Normanton	21,980	West Yorkshire
415	Westhoughton	21,960	Greater Manchester
416	Biggleswade	21,950	Bedfordshire
417	Gainsborough	21,910	Lincolnshire
418	Ossett	21,855	West Yorkshire
419	Seaham	21,665	County Durham
420	Great Bookham and Fetcham	21,655	Surrey
421	Darlaston	21,540	West Midlands
422	Stowmarket	21,535	Suffolk
423	Sunbury-on-Thames	21,475	Surrey
424	Old Trafford	21,445	Greater Manchester
425	Dorchester	21,360	Dorset
426	Hebburn	21,345	Tyne and Wear
427	March	21,345	Cambridgeshire
428	Bingley	21,330	West Yorkshire
429	Staines-upon-Thames	21,325	Surrey
430	Workington	21,275	Cumbria
431	Kirkby-in-Ashfield	21,270	Nottinghamshire
432	Berkhamsted	21,240	Hertfordshire
433	Brownhills	21,240	West Midlands
434	Dronfield	21,160	Derbyshire
435	Dukinfield	21,155	Greater Manchester
436	Quedgeley and Hardwicke	21,125	Gloucestershire
437	Clevedon	21,085	Somerset
438	Rothwell	20,965	West Yorkshire
439	Faversham	20,940	Kent
440	Dereham	20,785	Norfolk
441	Stamford	20,750	Lincolnshire
442	Horwich	20,700	Greater Manchester
443	Skegness	20,700	Lincolnshire
444	Stratton St Margaret	20,690	Wiltshire
445	Farnham	20,500	Surrey
446	Penwortham	20,485	Lancashire
447	Camborne	20,450	Cornwall
448	Spennymoor	20,410	County Durham
449	Maghull	20,370	Merseyside
450	Wednesbury	20,315	West Midlands
451	Stourport-on-Severn	20,305	Worcestershire
452	Harwich	20,215	Essex
453	Sandhurst	20,215	Berkshire
454	Ripley	20,180	Derbyshire
455	Goole	20,175	East Riding of Yorkshire
456	Hazel Grove	20,170	Greater Manchester
457	Buxton	20,050	Derbyshire
458	Hazlemere	20,005	Buckinghamshire

== See also ==
- List of cities in the United Kingdom
- City status in the United Kingdom, differing ways which cities have become cities.
- List of towns in England, England's towns in alphabet order and the differing ways which towns have become towns.
- List of towns and cities in England by historical population, the development of urban centres in England and before England through time.
- Settlements in ceremonial counties of England by population, places with 5,000 or more residents by county and the highest populated built-up area in each county.
- List of English districts by population, population of each local government district in England.
- List of urban areas in the United Kingdom sets out the population of each 2011 built-up area in the UK.
- List of primary urban areas in England by population
- List of built-up areas in Wales by population, Welsh equivalent.
