= Overdog =

Studio album by Keef Hartley Band
- Released: 8 April 1971
- Recorded: October–November 1970, January 1971
- Studio: Trident Studios, London; Morgan Studios, London; A.I.R., London
- Genre: Blues rock
- Length: 35:37
- Label: Deram
- Producer: Neil Slaven and Keef Hartley

Keef Hartley Band chronology
The Time is Near (1970)	Overdog (1971)	Seventy-Second Brave (1972)

Professional ratings
Review scores
Source	Rating
Allmusic	4/5 stars

Overdog is the fourth album by the Keef Hartley Band.

== Track listing ==
=== 1971 LP ===
Deram SDL 2 (UK), DES 18057 (US)

1. "You Can Choose" – 5:28
2. "Plain Talkin" – 3:23
3. "Theme Song / Enroute / Theme Song Reprise" – 8:05
4. "Overdog" – 4:20
5. "Roundabout" – 6:06
6. "Imitations From Home" – 3:34
7. "We Are All The Same" – 4:41

Tracks 2, 3, 4, 7 recorded at Trident Studios in January 1971
Tracks 1, 5 recorded at Morgan Studios in October 1970
Track 6 recorded at A.I.R. in November 1970

All songs written by Miller Anderson, except:

- "Enroute", written by Keef Hartley and Gary Thain
- "Imitations From Home", written by Keef Hartley

=== 2005 CD reissue ===
Eclectic Discs ECLDCD 1026
Same track listing as the 1971 LP with Bonus Tracks

- Roundabout (Part 1) Single – 2:57
- Roundabout (Part 2) SIngle – 4:18

== Personnel ==
=== Keef Hartley Band ===
- Keef Hartley – drums, percussion
- Miller Anderson – vocals, guitar
- Gary Thain – bass guitar
- Mick Weaver – keyboards
- Dave Caswell – trumpet, flugelhorn
- Lyle Jenkins – tenor saxophone, flute

=== Additional musicians ===
- Johnny Almond – flute (track 3)
- Jon Hiseman – drums, percussion (track 3)
- Peter Dines – keyboards (track 5)
- Ingrid Thomas, Joan Knighton, Valerie Charrington – backing vocals

=== Technical ===
- Neil Slaven, Keef Hartley – producers
- Robin Black – engineer, Morgan Studios
- John Punter – engineer, A.I.R.
- Roy Thomas Baker – engineer, Trident Studios
- Keef Hartley, Peter Dunn – design
- Richard Sacks – photography
