= Halfbreed (album) =

1969 album by Keef Hartley

Studio album by Keef Hartley Band
- Released: March 1969 (UK) / May 1969 (US/Canada)
- Recorded: 7, 9, 10 & 13 October, 11–12 December 1968
- Studio: Decca Studio No. 1, West Hampstead, London
- Genre: Blues rock
- Length: 46:57
- Label: Deram
- Producer: Neil Slaven

Keef Hartley Band chronology
Halfbreed (1969)	The Battle of North West Six (1969)

Professional ratings
Review scores
Source	Rating
AllMusic	3.5/5 stars
Encyclopedia of Popular Music	5/5 stars

Halfbreed is the debut album by the Keef Hartley Band. The band was formed when Keef Hartley left John Mayall's band after touring and playing on seven albums (some issued later), including being the only performer besides Mayall on The Blues Alone. Halfbreed includes two spoken passages featuring Mayall, as well as several notable British jazz-rock players.

It was voted number 3 in the All-Time 50 Long Forgotten Gems from Colin Larkin's All Time Top 1000 Albums.

== Track listing ==
=== 1969 LP ===
Deram SML 1037 (UK), DES 18024 (US)

1. "Sacked (Introducing Hearts and Flowers)" (Arranged by Keef Hartley) – 0:40
2. "Confusion Theme" (Hartley, Ian Cruikshank) – 1:05
3. "The Halfbreed" (Hartley, Peter Dines, Cruikshank) – 6:07
4. "Born to Die" (Dines, Hartley, Gary Thain, Fiona Hewitson) – 9:58
5. "Sinnin' For You" (Hartley, Dines, Hewitson, Owen Finnegan) – 5:51
6. "Leavin' Trunk" (Sleepy John Estes) – 5:55
7. "Just to Cry" (Henry Lowther, Finnegan) – 6:20
8. "Too Much Thinking" (Finnegan, Dines, Thain) – 5:30
9. "Think it Over" (B.B. King) – 4:59
10. "Too Much to Take (Speech)" – 0:32

=== 1995 CD reissue ===
One Way Records OW 30332

1. "Sacked (Introducing Hearts and Flowers)"
2. "Confusion Theme"
3. "Halfbreed"
4. "Born to Die"
5. "Sinnin' for you"
6. "Leavin' Trunk"
7. "Just to Cry"
8. "Too Much Thinking"
9. "Leave it 'til the Morning"
10. "Think it Over"
11. "Too Much to Take"

== Personnel ==
=== The Keef Hartley Band ===
- Miller Anderson – vocals, guitar
- Peter Dines – organ, harpsichord
- "Spit James" (real name: Ian Cruickshank) – guitar
- Gary Thain – bass guitar
- Keef Hartley – drums
- Henry Lowther – trumpet, violin, brass arrangements
- Harry Beckett – trumpet
- Lyn Dobson – tenor saxophone, flute
- Chris Mercer – tenor saxophone
- John Mayall – voice on "Sacked" and "Too Much to Take"

=== Technical ===
- Neil Slaven – producer
- Derek Varnals – recording engineer
- Adrian Martins – assistant engineer
- Bob Baker – front cover photography
- Richard Sacks – inside sleeve photography
