= Seventy-Second Brave =

Studio album by Keef Hartley Band
- Released: 1972
- Recorded: 1972
- Studio: Island, London; Trident, London
- Genre: Blues rock
- Length: 36:13
- Label: Deram
- Producer: Keef Hartley Band as "Us All"

Keef Hartley Band chronology
Overdog (1971)	Seventy-Second Brave (1972)	Lancashire Hustler (1973)

Professional ratings
Review scores
Source	Rating
Allmusic	(not rated)

Seventy-Second Brave is the fifth album by the Keef Hartley Band.

== Track listing ==
Deram SDL 9 (UK), XDES 18065 (US)

1. "Heartbreakin' Woman" (Junior Kerr) – 4:18
2. "Marin County" (Chris Mercer) – 3:55
3. "Hard Pill to Swallow" (Pete Wingfield) – 5:40
4. "Don't You Be Long" (Kerr) – 5:16
5. "Nicturns" (C. Crowe) – 2:07
6. "Don't Sign It" (Mercer) – 4:24
7. "Always Thinking of You" (C. Crowe) – 4:37
8. "You Say You're Together Now" (Gary Thain) – 3:42
9. "What It Is" (C. Crowe) – 1:19

== Personnel ==
=== Keef Hartley Band ===
- Keef Hartley – drums, cover illustration
- Junior Kerr – guitar, vocals
- Pete Wingfield – piano, vocals
- Gary Thain – bass guitar, vocals
- Chris Mercer – tenor saxophone, baritone saxophone
- Nick Newell – alto saxophone, flute
- Mick Weaver – organ

=== Technical ===
- Keef Hartley Band – producer
- John Burns – engineer, Island Studios
- Roy Baker – engineer, Trident Studios
- Harry Isles – photography
