= Keef Hartley =

English drummer and bandleader (1944–2011)

- Also known as: Keef Hartley
- Born: Keith Hartley; 8 April 1944; Plungington, England
- Died: 26 November 2011 (aged 67) Royal Preston Hospital, Fulwood, England
- Genres: Rock
- Occupations: Drummer, bandleader
- Instrument: Drums
- Years active: 1960s–1975
- Formerly of: John Mayall & the Bluesbreakers, The Artwoods

Keith "Keef" Hartley (8 April 1944 – 26 November 2011) was an English drummer and bandleader. He fronted his own band, known as the Keef Hartley Band or Keef Hartley's Big Band, and played at Woodstock. He was later a member of Dog Soldier, and variously worked with Rory Storm, the Artwoods and John Mayall.

== Biography ==
Keith Hartley was born in Plungington, north-west Preston, Lancashire. He studied drumming under Lloyd Ryan, who also taught Phil Collins the drum rudiments. His career began as the replacement for Ringo Starr as a drummer for Rory Storm and the Hurricanes, a Liverpool-based band, after Ringo joined the Beatles. Subsequently, he played and recorded with the Artwoods, then achieved some renown as John Mayall's drummer (including his role as the only musician, other than Mayall, to play on Mayall's 1967 "solo" record The Blues Alone). He then formed The Keef Hartley (Big) Band, mixing elements of jazz, blues, and rock and roll; the group played at Woodstock in 1969. However, the band was the only artist that played at the festival whose set was never included on any officially released album (prior to 2019), nor on the soundtrack of the film.

They released five albums, including Halfbreed and The Battle of North West Six (characterised by a reviewer for the Vancouver Sun as "an amazing display of virtuosity").

While in John Mayall's band, Mayall had pushed Hartley to form his own group. A mock-up of the "firing" of Hartley was heard on the Halfbreed album's opening track, "Sacked". The band for the first album comprised: Miller Anderson, guitar and vocals, Gary Thain (bass), later with Uriah Heep; Peter Dines (organ) and Ian Cruickshank (as "Spit James") (guitar). Later members to join Hartley's fluid line-up included Mick Weaver (aka Wynder K. Frog) organ, Henry Lowther (b. 11 July 1941, Leicester, England; trumpet/violin), Jimmy Jewell (saxophone), Johnny Almond (flute), Jon Hiseman and Harry Beckett. Hartley, often dressed as an American Indian sometimes in full head-dress and war-paint, was a popular attraction on the small club scene. The Battle of NW6 in 1969 further enhanced his club reputation, although chart success still eluded him. By the time of the third album both Lowther and Jewell had departed.

After that Hartley released a 'solo' album (Lancashire Hustler, 1973) and then he formed Dog Soldier with Miller Anderson (guitar), Paul Bliss (bass), Derek Griffiths (guitar) and Mel Simpson (keyboards). They released an eponymous album in 1975, which had a remastered release in early 2011 on CD on the Esoteric label.

In 2007, Hartley released a ghostwritten autobiography, Halfbreed (A Rock and Roll Journey That Happened Against All the Odds). Hartley wrote about his life growing up in Preston, and his career as a drummer and bandleader, including the Keef Hartley Band's appearance at Woodstock.

Hartley died of complications from surgery on 26 November 2011, aged 67, at Royal Preston Hospital in Fulwood, north Preston.

== Discography ==
Keef Hartley Band

- Halfbreed (1969)
- The Battle of North West Six (1969)
- The Time Is Near (1970) – (NR 191 USA) UK No. 41
- Overdog (1971)
- Little Big Band (live at the Marquee Club) (1971)
- Seventy-Second Brave (1972)
- Not Foolish Not Wise (1968–1972 / studio + live) (1999; reissue: 2003)
- Live At Essen Pop & Blues Festival 1969-1970 (2024)

Solo

- Lancashire Hustler (1973)

Dog Soldier

- Dog Soldier (1975) UAS 29769, recorded at Island Basing Street Studios, London, 18 November – 15 December 1974

With John Mayall

- Crusade (1967)
- The Blues Alone (1967)
- The Diary of a Band - Volume One (1968) (live)
- The Diary of a Band - Volume Two (1968) (live)
- Live in Europe (1971)
- Back to the Roots (1971) (some tracks only)
- Moving On (1973) (live)
- Ten Years Are Gone (1973) (studio + live)

With Vinegar Joe

- Rock'n Roll Gypsies (1972)

Michael Chapman (singer)

- Pleasures Of The Street (1975)
- Savage Amusement (1976)
- The Man Who Hated Mornings (1977)
