= Lancashire Hustler =

Studio album by Keef Hartley
- Released: 1973
- Recorded: 1973
- Genre: Blues rock
- Length: 38:30
- Label: Deram
- Producer: John Burns

Keef Hartley chronology
Seventy-Second Brave (1972)	Lancashire Hustler (1973)	Not Foolish, Not Wise (2003)

Professional ratings
Review scores
Source	Rating
AllMusic	(not rated)

Lancashire Hustler is the debut solo album by Keef Hartley. Robert Palmer, Elkie Brooks and Pete Gage of the band Vinegar Joe (with whom Hartley worked on the 1972 album Rock 'n Roll Gypsies) provided support on some tracks.

== Track listing ==
=== 1973 LP ===
Deram SDL 13 (UK), XDES 18070 (US)

1. "Circles" (Robert Palmer) - 5:21
2. "You and Me" (Hartley) - 3:57
3. "Shovel a Minor" (Hartley) - 4:22
4. "Australian Lady" (Hartley, John Mayall) - 4:36
5. "Keef's Mom" (Hartley) - 1:01
6. "Action" (John Burns) - 5:52
7. "Something About You" (John Burns) - 3:58
8. "Jennie's Father" (Ken Cumberbatch) - 3:12
9. "Dance to the Music" (Sylvester Stewart) - 6:19

== Personnel ==
- Jess Roden - vocals
- Junior Kerr - vocals, guitar
- Jean Roussel - keyboards
- Mick Weaver - organ, Moog
- Philip Chen - bass
- Keef Hartley - drums
- Elkie Brooks - backing vocals
- Robert Palmer - backing vocals
- Pete Gage - orchestration - tracks 3,7
- Derek Wadsworth - orchestration - track 8
- John Burns - engineer, producer
