= The Battle of North West Six =

1969 album by Keef Hartley

Studio album by Keef Hartley Band
- Released: November 1969
- Recorded: April and July 1969
- Studio: Decca, London
- Genre: Blues rock
- Length: 41:36
- Label: Deram
- Producer: Neil Slaven

Keef Hartley Band chronology
Halfbreed (1969)	The Battle of North West Six (1969)	The Time is Near (1970)

Professional ratings
Review scores
Source	Rating
Allmusic	2/5 stars
Rolling Stone	(positive)

The Battle of North West Six is the second album by the Keef Hartley Band. At the time, Hartley's six-piece group was appearing augmented with a brass section as The Keef Hartley Big Band, and a number of songs on the album feature this extended line-up.

== Track listing ==
=== 1969 LP ===
Deram SML 1054 (UK), DES 18035 (US)

1. "The Dansette Kid / "Hartley Jam for Bread" (Fiona Hewitson, Spit James, Keef Hartley, Gary Thain) – 3:59
2. "Don't Give Up" (Hewitson, James, Hartley, Thain) – 4:07
3. "Me and My Woman" (Gene Barge) – 4:24
4. "Hickory" (Hewitson, James, Hartley, Thain) – 2:45
5. "Don't Be Afraid" (Hewitson, James, Hartley, Peter Dines, Thain) – 4:25
6. "Not Foolish, Not Wise" (Hewitson, James, Hartley, Thain) – 3:56
7. "Waiting Around" (Hewitson, Hartley, Thain) – 2:29
8. "Tadpole" (Hewitson, Hartley, Thain) – 7:00
9. "Poor Mabel (You're Just Like Me)" (Hewitson, James, Hartley, Thain) – 3:08
10. "Believe In You" (Hewitson, Hartley, Thain) – 5:23

Fiona Hewitson is Miller Anderson writing under his wife's name for contractual reasons.

=== 1995 CD reissue ===
One Way Records OW 30333
Same track listing as the 1969 LP

== Personnel ==
=== Keef Hartley Band ===
- Keef Hartley – drums, percussion
- Miller Anderson – vocals, guitars (various)
- Henry Lowther – trumpet, flugelhorn, violin, brass arrangements
- Jim Jewell – tenor saxophone
- Gary Thain – bass guitar
- "Spit James" (real name: Ian Cruickshank) – guitar (Tracks 1 & 5)

=== Additional musicians ===
- Mick Weaver – organ, piano, percussion
- Mike Davis – trumpet
- Harry Beckett – trumpet, flugelhorn
- Lyn Dobson – tenor saxophone, flute
- Chris Mercer – tenor saxophone
- Barbara Thompson – baritone saxophone, flute
- Ray Warleigh – flute
- Mick Taylor – guitar (Track 10)

=== Technical ===
- Neil Slaven – producer
- Derek Varnals – engineer
- Adrian Martins, John Punter – assistant engineers
- Art Wood – artwork
- Richard Sacks – photography
