= Ian Cruickshank =

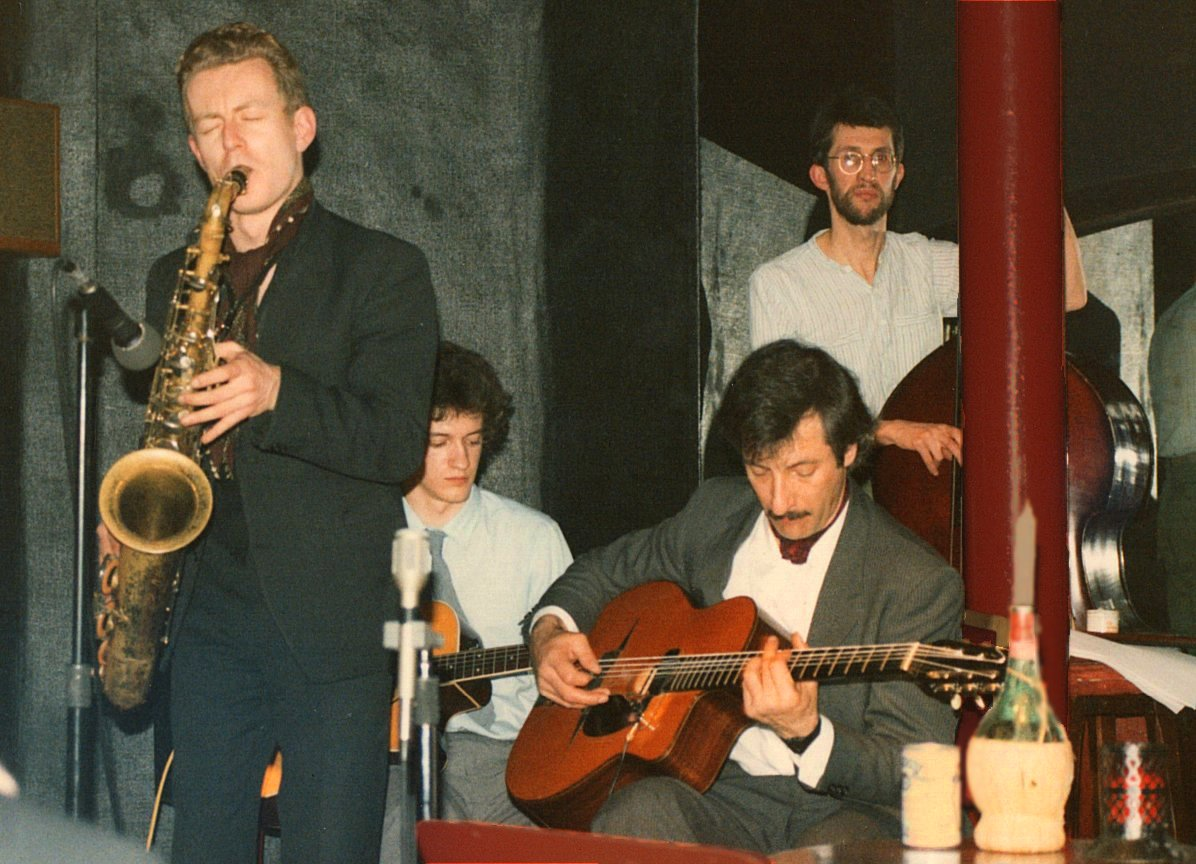
- Ian Cruickshank's Gypsy Jazz performing at the Pizza Express, London, 1986

Background information
- Also known as: Spit James
- Born: Ian Cruickshank; 1947
- Origin: United Kingdom
- Died: 29 April 2017 (aged 69–70)
- Genres: blues-rock, gypsy jazz
- Occupations: Musician, author, educator, promoter, producer, record label owner
- Instruments: Acoustic & electric guitar
- Years active: 1965–2017

Ian Cruickshank (1947 – 29 April 2017) was an English electric and acoustic guitarist most associated with the blues-rock and gypsy jazz genres, also well known in the U.K. as an educator, author and columnist, record producer and record label owner, festival organiser and promoter of artists in the gypsy jazz world. He achieved some success in the 1960s in the Keef Hartley Band playing electric guitar under the pseudonym Spit James before becoming enamoured of the gypsy jazz style originated by Django Reinhardt in the 1930s and devoting almost all of his energies to educating, performing and promoting activities in this area up till his death in 2017. He published several influential books on gypsy jazz, was producer and music co-ordinator for the TV Documentary Django Legacy, was the owner of the Fret Records record label, and organised the UK Gypsy Jazz Guitar Festival annually from 1997 to 2000.

== Biography ==
Ian Cruickshank grew up in the south-east of England where he formed his first band, The Ian Lloyd Bluesmen, in 1965 at the age of 18. One night in 1968, after a gig supporting John Mayall's Bluesbreakers he was approached by Mayall's drummer Keith "Keef" Hartley who was leaving Mayall to form his own band, and asked Cruickshank to join; turning professional by this means, and with the stage name of "Spit James" (coined by Hartley so as to sound more like a bluesman), Cruickshank went on to record two albums with the band (Halfbreed and The Battle Of North West Six) before leaving after 18 months. His work on Halfbreed caught the ear of many fans, one retrospective reviewer stating that Ian/Spit was "rather the star of the album".

After leaving Hartley, Ian briefly abandoned music for a while, but at some point became fascinated with the playing of the late jazz guitar legend Django Reinhardt and taught himself to play quite effectively in this style - a feat given the dearth of gypsy jazz stylists in the U.K. at that time. Eventually in May 1978 he made his way to the village of Samois-sur-Seine to attend the Django Reinhardt memorial jazz festival which in that year was celebrating 25 years after the death of Django and discovered how the living tradition of gypsy jazz was flourishing among the Manouche gypsies of France and northern Europe. Documenting his experiences in a magazine article the following year entitled "Django Re-visited", he described his discovery of players such as Boulou and Elios Ferré playing with their father Matelo, Raphaël Faÿs, Christian Escoudé as well as those of the older generation then still performing including Django's brother Joseph Reinhardt and Django's first son Lousson, who were by then playing more in an electric style. Ian also taped a number of these performances on a small portable tape recorder and later made the performances available on a subscription-only cassette entitled "Gypsy Jazz from France" which for many U.K. enthusiasts was their first opportunity to access performances of this style of music by living musicians.

Around this time Ian was contributing a monthly column "Guitar Django Style" to the U.K.'s Guitar magazine, which were eventually collated to form the nucleus of Ian's first published book, "The Guitar Style of Django Reinhardt" (1982) which also included numerous original photographs as well as notes on present-day gypsy practitioners of the style. He was active in promoting gypsy jazz performances in the U.K. by bringing over artists such as Waso, Raphaël Faÿs and Biréli Lagrène as well as performing with his own groups, entitled first Swing Guitars and later, Ian Cruckshank's Gypsy Jazz. In 1994 Ian produced a second book entitled "Django's Gypsies: The Mystique of Django Reinhardt and his People" which was subtitled "a unique collection of photographs, illustrations, memorabilia and quotations" and included reprints of a number of articles along with numerous original and rare photographs related to the gypsies and gypsy jazz. In 1991 he was producer and music co-ordinator for John Jeremy's TV Documentary "Django Legacy". He organised the U.K. "Gypsy Jazz Guitar Festival" annually from 1997 to 2000, and appeared as a guest artist on three compilation albums from these for the years 1998, 1999 and 2000. He also produced an instructional VHS tape (later DVD) "Gypsy Jazz Guitar" as well as additional books entitled "Getting Started With Jazz Guitar", "Notes", "The A to Z of Django", "Chord and Discord", and "Noticed Moments", as well as appearing on the CDs Swingin' Spirits and Django Meets the Duke (both with the U.S.-based group Pearl Django), Water Gypsy, and Now and Zen. As a sideline, he founded "Fret Records" to release these and other albums of gypsy jazz interest.

His death at the age of 70 was reported in April 2017. Chris Martin, writing on the "djangobooks" forum, expressed the views of many when he wrote: "Every Brit, and many others, who love the Django style owe him a huge thanks for everything he has done over the years, his books were my first introduction to the style."

== Discography ==
- FJC 102 – Ian Cruickshank's Gypsy Jazz (Cassette, 1993) Ian Cruickshank, lead guitar; Jez Cook, rhythm guitar; Andy Crowdy, bass, balalaika.
- FJCD 107 – Swingin' Spirits - Ian Cruickshank with Pearl Django (1995)
- FJCD 109 – Django Meets The Duke - Ian Cruickshank's Gypsy Jazz, with Alan Barnes, Johhny Van Derrick and Pearl Django (1996)
- FJCD 114 – The Gypsy Jazz Guitar Festival '98 (1998) - Ian appears on tracks 1-2 (as the Paul Chester Trio), 10 (with Claudine Valadier-Larne), and 13-14 (with Patrick Sausois et al.)
- FJCD 115 – The Gypsy Jazz Guitar Festival '99 (1999) - Ian appears on tracks 1-2 (as the Paul Chester Trio) and 10-11 (with Mito and Dorno)
- FJCD 116 – Water Gypsy - Ian Cruickshank (?2000)
- FJCD 117 – The Gypsy Jazz Guitar Festival 2000 (2000) - Ian Cruickshank's Gypsy Jazz perform on tracks 1–3.
- FJCD 118 – Now and Zen - Cruickshank/Morgan/Coverdale - with John Coverdale, guitar; Pete Morgan, bass

== Published books and DVDs ==
- The Guitar Style of Django Reinhardt Book, self-published, 1982; subsequently reprinted as "The Guitar Style of Django Reinhardt & the Gypsies".
- Django's Gypsies: The Mystique of Django Reinhardt and his People. Book, Hal Leonard Publishing Corporation, 1994
- Getting Started With Jazz Guitar (Tutor)
- Notes (Book)
- The A to Z of Django (Book)
- Chord and Discord (Book)
- Noticed Moments (Book)
- Gypsy Jazz Guitar - taught by Ian Cruickshank (VHS tape, subsequently DVD)

== Other ==
- Compiler, Gypsy Jazz from France, subscription-only cassette featuring live recordings from 1978 Samois Festival and elsewhere
- Musical adviser and co-producer on 1991 documentary film The Django Legacy, dir. John Jeremy, subsequently available on VHS tape as Gypsy guitar : The legacy of Django Reinhardt
