= Herbie Goins =

American singer-songwriter (1939–2015)

- Born: Hubert Leroy Goins; February 21, 1939; Ocala, Florida, U.S.
- Died: October 27, 2015 (aged 76) Italy
- Genres: R&B, blues, soul, gospel
- Instrument: Vocals
- Years active: Late 1950s–2015
- Label: Parlophone
- Website: www.herbiegoins.com

Hubert Leroy "Herbie" Goins (February 21, 1939 – October 27, 2015) was an American rhythm & blues singer. He worked mainly in England in the 1960s, notably with Alexis Korner and then as the leader of Herbie Goins & The Night-Timers (or Nightimers). He later continued his career based in Sezze, Italy.

== Life and career ==
He was born and grew up in Ocala, Florida, and sang in his local church as a child before forming his first blues group, The Teen Kings. He later moved to New York City and continued his singing career, opening for such acts as B. B. King, Bobby Bland and Sam Cooke. He was drafted in the late 1950s and served as a GI in the medical corps in Germany, with Edwin Starr. After leaving the US Army and joining the band led by Eric Delaney, with whom he travelled to England. Goins then joined the Chris Barber Band for a time, before, in late 1963, becoming the featured singer in Alexis Korner's band, Blues Incorporated. In February 1964, he sang on the Blues Incorporated album Live At The Cavern, and later in the year on their album Red Hot From Alex, alongside such musicians as Dick Heckstall-Smith, Danny Thompson and Art Themen.

In 1965, Goins left Korner to front another band, the Nightimers (or, sometimes, Night-Timers) who had originally formed in July 1964, after their singer Ronnie Jones left. The group quickly gained a reputation, especially among Mods, as one of the hottest R&B bands in the UK. Band members included Mick Eve (tenor saxophone) (born Michael Eve, 21 December 1937, Walthamstow, North East London), Mike Carr (keyboards), Harry Beckett (trumpet), David Price (bass), Bill Stephens (drums), and Speedy Acquaye (congas). In 1966, Herbie Goins and the Night-Timers recorded "No. 1 In Your Heart", written by Clyde Wilson (who recorded as Steve Mancha) and Wilburt Jackson, and first recorded by Motown group The Monitors. Goins' single, released on the Parlophone label, was not a hit but remained popular among Mods and later Northern soul fans. He and his band, which in 1966 featured John McLaughlin on guitar, toured the UK supporting Otis Redding. They also regularly played at top clubs in London, including the Flamingo and the Marquee, on bills with Jimi Hendrix, John Lee Hooker and others, as well as touring in Europe. An album released under the title of Soul Soul Soul, or alternatively No. 1 In Your Heart, was released in some countries and featured tracks recorded in 1966-67. In the late 1960s they briefly merged with Mick Weaver's band Wynder K Frog, before travelling to Italy where they worked until 1971. After some of their equipment was stolen, Goins stayed in Italy when the rest of the band returned to England.

Goins then worked in Italy as a songwriter and record producer, and in television. He released several funk records in Italy in the 1980s, including "You Don't Love Me" (credited as "Herbie") and "Scrap Rap" in 1983, "Hold On" (1984), and "I Feel Good" (1986). He also collaborated with Italian blues guitarist Guido Toffoletti on several albums. He resumed performing in the late 1980s, leading the Herbie Goins Soul Band, mainly at festivals in Europe but also in the US and Britain, and also occasionally reunited for shows with Barber and Heckstall-Smith. In 2009 he toured the UK with Cliff Bennett, Chris Farlowe and the Norman Beaker Band. He also led a gospel vocal group, Stars of Joy.

He died in Italy on October 27, 2015, aged 76.

== Legacy ==
Many of Goins' 1960s recordings were reissued on the Zonophone CD No. 1 In Your Heart in 2008.
