= List of towns and cities in England by historical population =

This is a list of the largest cities and towns of England ordered by population at various points during history. Until the first modern census was conducted in 1801 there was no centrally conducted method of determining the populations of England's settlements at any one time, and so data has to be used from a number of other historical surveys. The lists below are derived from the best available data and the ordering is in many cases only approximate.

== Iron Age ==
The first settlements that can genuinely be considered urban appear in the 1st century BC, and are known to archaeologists as oppida. Generally these oppida became the main urban centres of the various tribal divisions used under the Romans. Certain examples include Colchester, Leicester, St Albans, Silchester, Winchester, and Canterbury, however there may have been many others, such as Dorchester. Their distribution is limited to the south of the country. Estimating the populations of these oppida is fraught with difficulty by the nature of the evidence, and as such no precise hierarchy has yet been established; however it is generally agreed that by the time of the Roman conquest Colchester was probably the largest, perhaps followed by Silchester.

== Roman period ==
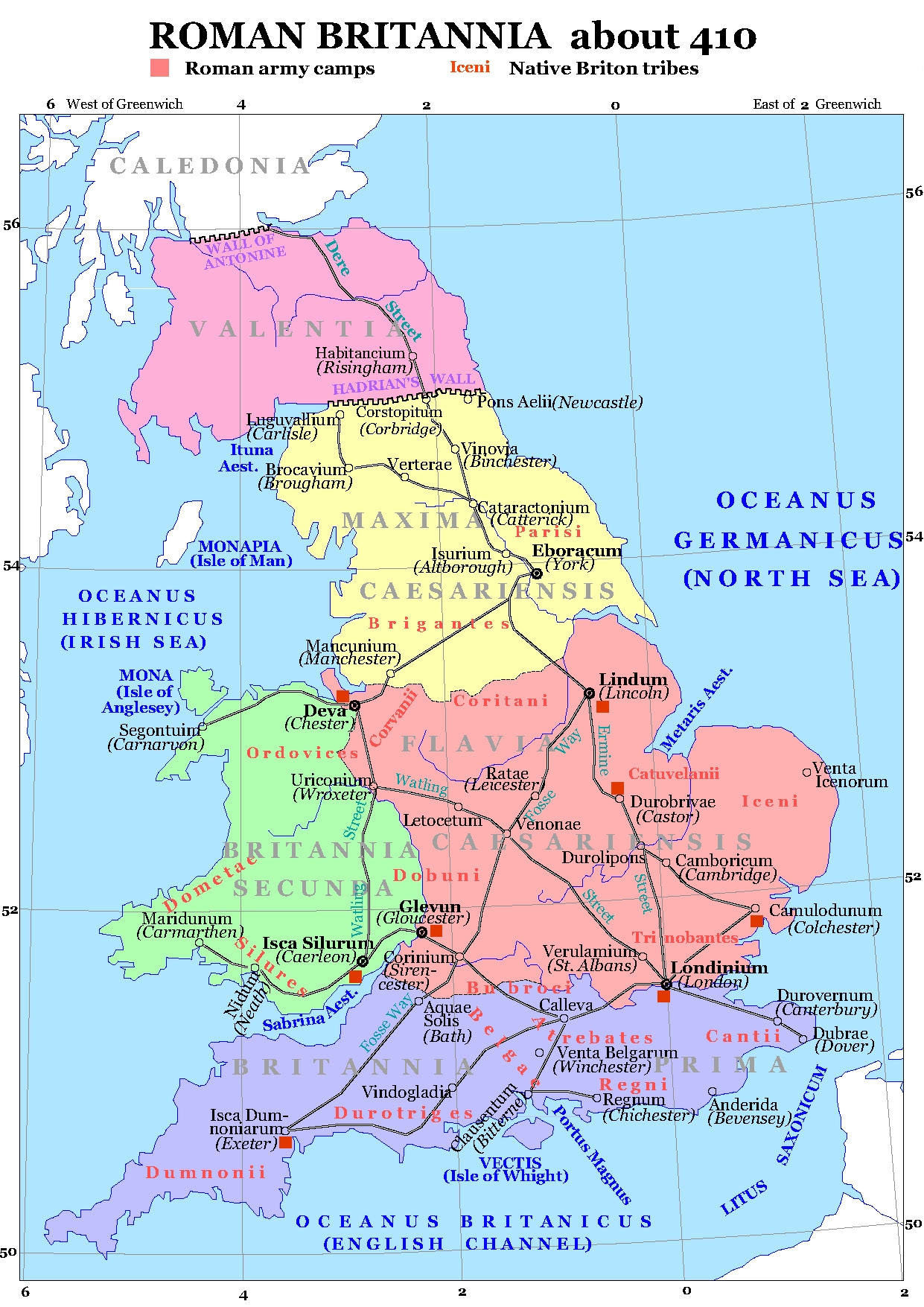
One possible arrangement of the late Roman provinces, with Valentia between the walls

When the Romans invaded in AD 43, their key strategic target was the oppidum at Colchester, the capital of the powerful Catuvellauni. Many of the oppida in the south were simply converted over time into Roman towns. However, the Romans were the first to establish urban settlements outside the southeast. How deliberate this process was is open to debate: many towns grew up of their own accord around major army forts, such as at Caerleon or Exeter; these were known as vici. Londinium (London) is something of an exception; it seems to have developed out of a trading colony, and eventually came to eclipse even Colchester in terms of population and importance thanks to its command of the Thames commercial axis. There was no significant Iron Age oppidum in this area. It is again difficult to establish a hierarchy, as direct population records are lacking for this period. The largest city however at least by the second century was London, perhaps followed by Winchester, York and Lincoln.

== Anglo-Saxon Period ==
Kingdoms in England and Wales about 600 AD

Urban sites were on the decline from the late Roman period and remained of very minor importance until around the 9th century. The largest cities in later Anglo-Saxon England however were Winchester, London and York, in that order, although London had eclipsed Winchester by the 11th century. Details of population size are however lacking.

Estimates of Town Populations in 1066
Rank	Town	Darby
1	London	
2	Winchester	
3	York	8,000
4	Norwich	6,500
5	Lincoln	6,000
6	Thetford	5,000
7	Oxford	5,000

== Norman Period ==
Largest towns in 1086

The Norman conquest of 1066 changed the demographics of England significantly, with many settlements being destroyed by the invading army. In 1086, William the Conqueror ordered the creation of the Domesday Book, a systematic survey of the kingdom of England. Over 100 settlements were classified as "borough" status and the number of houses or burgesses were counted. Nonetheless, it is not possible to know precisely the population of any borough because the residents per household is uncertain and the reported lands which form the borough are often debatable. London was comfortably the largest borough in England and has remained so ever since, though it was not assessed in the Domesday survey, nor were Winchester, Bristol, and several other larger boroughs. Their populations must be estimated by other means.

Estimates of town populations in 1086 (Note: Russell and Darby both give estimates for the largest boroughs in England at the time of the Domesday survey. Russell gives no estimate for Bury St Edmunds, and Darby gives none for Bristol and Hereford. Whereas Russell assumes 3.5 residents per household reported in Domesday, Darby uses the more widely accepted multipliers of 4.5 or 5.0. Another difference is that Russell gives point estimates which are reproduced in the table, whereas Darby prefers to give ranges or verbal qualifiers to indicate uncertainty. Plus or minus 25% may be a reasonable range to place around most of the mean estimates as it captures all but the most extreme of the differences between the two authors.)
Rank	Town	Russell	Darby (Note: The table represents Darby's suggestions as point estimates. For example, Darby gives an estimate of "about four to five thousand" for Lincoln, which is represented in the table as 4,500. Where Darby gives only a single lower or upper bound, that figure is used in the table. His estimate of "not more than 5,000" for York is shown as 5,000, and his estimate of "2,000 inhabitants or more" for Leicester and Nottingham is shown as 2,000. His estimate of "nearer 5,000 than 4,000" for Norwich is shown as 4,750)	Other
1	London	17,850	10,000	
2	Winchester	6,000	6,750	
3	Norwich	4,445	~4,750	
4	York	4,134	~5,000	
5	Lincoln	3,560	4,500	
6	Thetford	2,681	4,000	
7	Bristol	2,310		
8	Gloucester	2,146	2,750	
9	Wallingford	1,718	3,000	2,500
10	Hereford	1,689		
11	Stamford	1,424	3,000	
12	Bury St Edmunds		3,000	
13	Canterbury	1,610	2,500	
14	Oxford	1,431	2,500	
15	Hastings	1,740	2,000	
16	Dunwich	1,596	2,000	
17	Dover	1,568	2,000	
18	Lewes	1,484	2,000	
19	Chester	1,960	1,500	
20	Cambridge	1,960	1,500	
21	Sandwich	1,452	2,000	
22	Exeter	1,438	2,000	
23	Leicester	1,278	2,000	
24	Colchester	1,452		
25	Wilton	1,446		
26	Nottingham	833	2,000	
27	Hythe	1,687	1,000	
28	Huntingdon	1,316	1,500	
29	Steyning	1,306		
30	Warwick	1,284		
31	Northampton	1,032	1,500	
32	Ipswich	980	1,500	
33	Bath	1,155	1,000	
34	Shaftesbury	1,062	1,000	
35	Chichester	1,050	1,000	

== Late Medieval Period ==
By the start of the 14th century the structure of most English towns had changed considerably since the Domesday survey. A number of towns were granted market status and had grown around local trades. Also notable is the reduction in importance of Winchester, the Anglo-Saxon capital city of Wessex.

Although not a direct measure of population, the lay subsidy rolls of 1334 can be used as a measure of both a settlement's size and stature and the table gives the 30 largest towns and cities in England according to that report. The lay subsidy, an early form of poll tax, however, omitted a sizeable proportion of the population.

In 1377 the first true poll tax was levied in which everyone over the age of 14 who was not exempt was required to pay a groat to the Crown. The records taken listed the name and location of everyone who paid the tax and so give an excellent measure of the population at the time, although assumptions need to be made about the proportion of the population who were under 14, generally taken to be around a third.

1377
Rank	Town	Population
1	London	34,971
2	York	10,872
3	Bristol	9,518
4	Plymouth	7,256
5	Coventry	7,226
6	Norwich	5,928
7	Lincoln	5,354
8	Salisbury	4,839
9	King's Lynn	4,691
10	Colchester	4,432
11	Boston	4,307
12	Beverley	3,994
13	Newcastle	3,970
14	Canterbury	3,861
15	Bury St Edmunds	3,668
16	Oxford	3,536
17	Gloucester	3,358
18	Leicester	3,152
19	Shrewsbury	3,123
20	Great Yarmouth	2,912
21	Hereford	2,854
22	Cambridge	2,853
23	Ely	2,583
24	Exeter	2,340
25	Hull	2,336
26	Worcester	2,336
27	Ipswich	2,260
28	Northampton	2,216
29	Nottingham	2,170
30	Winchester	2,160
31	Scarborough	2,090
32	Stamford	1,827
33	Newark-on-Trent	1,767
34	Ludlow	1,758
35	Southampton	1,728
35	Pontefract	1,628
36	Reading	1,575
37	Derby	1,569
38	Lichfield	1,536
39	Newbury	1,500
40	Wells	1,352

== Early Modern Period ==
No strong information for population exists for the 15th century, with most modern estimates relying on analyses of baptism records. For the 16th century, the lay subsidy returns of 1523-1527 once again provide an excellent measure of households and adult population from which the overall populations can be estimated. The table shows the prosperity of East Anglia, principally due to the wool trade, accounting for eleven of the top thirty (whereas only one, Norwich, makes the top thirty largest towns and cities today).

1523
Rank	Town	Population
1	London	
2	Norwich, Norfolk	
3	Bristol	
4	Newcastle	
5	Coventry	
6	Exeter	
7	Salisbury	
8	Ipswich, Suffolk	
9	King's Lynn, Norfolk	
10	Canterbury	
11	Reading	
12	Colchester, Essex	
13	Bury St Edmunds, Suffolk	
14	Lavenham, Suffolk	
15	York	
16	Totnes	
17	Worcester	
18	Gloucester	
19	Lincoln	
20	Hereford	
21	Great Yarmouth, Norfolk	
22	Hull	
23	Boston	
24	Southampton	
25	Hadleigh, Suffolk	
26	Wisbech	
27	Shrewsbury	
28	Oxford	
29	Leicester	
30	Cambridge	

== 17th/18th century ==
The 17th and 18th centuries proved a low point for Britain's demography with no major structured survey of the nation's populations. The best estimate from this period is obtained from the hearth tax of 1662, which formed a survey of the number of hearths in each home. As with the Domesday survey, this did not form a direct measure of population but can be extrapolated to provide an estimate of the population of a town. The 1662 table gives the approximate order of the towns of the time from the survey. Most notable from a modern viewpoint is the fact that Manchester, Birmingham, Leeds, Liverpool and Sheffield do not make the top thirty, whereas within around 100 years they would become England's largest provincial cities. The 1750 table is again formed from estimates.

=== Rankings by year ===
1662
Rank	Town	Population
1	London	350,000
2	Norwich	60,000
3	York	
4	Bristol	
5	Newcastle	
6	Exeter	
7	Ipswich	
8	Great Yarmouth	
9	Oxford	
10	Cambridge	
11	Canterbury	
12	Worcester	
13	Deptford	
14	Shrewsbury	
15	Salisbury	
16	Colchester	
17	East Greenwich	
18	Hull	
19	Coventry	
20	Chester	
21	Plymouth	
22	Portsmouth	
23	King's Lynn	
24	Rochester	
25	Lincoln	
26	Dover	
27	Nottingham	
28	Gloucester	
29	Bury St Edmunds	
30	Winchester	

1750
Rank	Town	Pop'n
1	London	675,000
2	Bristol	45,000
3	Birmingham	24,000
4	Liverpool	22,000
5	Manchester	18,000
6	Leeds	16,000
7	Sheffield	12,000

== 19th century ==
The Census Act 1800 resulted in Great Britain's first modern Census a year later, and other than 1941 a census has been taken every ten years since. The resulting populations of England's towns and cities clearly shows the effect of the Industrial Revolution on the urban population, particularly in the growth of the cities of the north and north-west. The data in the tables are taken from the censuses.

=== Rankings by year ===
1801
Rank	Town	Pop'n
1	London	864,845
2	Manchester	84,020
3	Liverpool	77,653
4	Birmingham	75,670
5	Bristol	63,645
6	Leeds	53,162
7	Plymouth	43,194
8	Norwich	36,832
9	Bath	32,200
10	Portsmouth	32,166
11	Sheffield	31,314
12	Kingston upon Hull	29,516
13	Nottingham	28,861
14	Newcastle	28,366
15	Leicester	16,953
16	Exeter	16,827
17	Stoke-upon-Trent	16,414
18	York	16,145
19	Coventry	16,034
20	Ashton-under-Lyne	15,632
21	Chester	15,052
22	Dover	14,845
22	Great Yarmouth	14,845
24	Stockport	14,830
25	Shrewsbury	14,739
26	Wolverhampton	12,565
27	Bolton	12,549
28	Sunderland	12,412
29	Oldham	12,024
30	Blackburn	11,980

1861
Rank	Town	Pop'n
1	London	2,804,000
2	Liverpool	443,900
3	Manchester	338,700
4	Birmingham	296,000
5	Leeds	207,200
6	Sheffield	185,200
7	Bristol	154,100
8	Plymouth (Note: Includes Devonport)	113,300
9	Newcastle	109,300
10	Bradford	106,200
11	Stoke-upon-Trent	101,200
12	Hull	99,000
13	Portsmouth	94,500
14	Preston	83,000
15	Sunderland	80,300
16	Brighton	77,700
17	Nottingham	74,500
18	Oldham	72,300
19	Norwich	70,958
20	Bolton	70,400
21	Leicester	68,100
22	Blackburn	63,100
23	Wolverhampton	60,900
24	Stockport	54,700
25	Bath	52,500
26	Birkenhead	51,600
27	Southampton	47,000
28	Derby	43,100
29	Coventry	40,900
30	York	40,400

1881
Rank	Town	Pop'n
1	London	3,814,600
2	Liverpool	552,500
3	Birmingham	400,800
4	Manchester	341,400
5	Leeds	309,100
6	Sheffield	284,500
7	Bristol	206,900
8	Bradford	183,000
9	Hull	154,200
10	Stoke-upon-Trent	152,400
11	Newcastle	145,400
12	Plymouth	139,000
13	Portsmouth	128,000
14	Leicester	122,400
15	Sunderland	116,500
16	Nottingham	111,600
17	Oldham	111,300
18	Brighton	107,500
19	Bolton	105,400
20	Blackburn	104,000
21	Preston	96,500
22	Norwich	87,800
23	Birkenhead	84,000
24	Huddersfield	81,800
25	Derby	81,200
26	Wolverhampton	75,800
27	Halifax	73,600
28	Rochdale	68,900
29	Gateshead	65,800
30	Southampton	60,100

== 20th century ==
Measurement of the population of England's towns and cities during the 20th century is complicated by determining what forms a separate "town" and where its exact boundaries lie, with boundaries often being moved. The lists are those of the constituent towns and cities, as opposed to those of the district or conurbation. For example, Salford is measured separately to Manchester, and Gateshead to Newcastle. The only exception to this is London for which the measure is that of Greater London. See English cities by population for further discussion.

=== Rankings by years ===
1900
Rank	Town	Pop'n
1	London	6,339,500
2	Liverpool	702,200
3	Manchester	543,900
4	Birmingham	522,200
5	Leeds	429,000
6	Sheffield	409,100
7	Bristol	329,400
8	Bradford	279,800
9	Plymouth	263,600
10	Hull	240,300
11	Nottingham	239,700
12	Salford	221,000
13	Newcastle	215,300
14	Stoke-on-Trent	214,700
15	Leicester	211,600
16	Portsmouth	188,100
17	Bolton	168,200
18	Sunderland	146,100
19	Oldham	137,200
20	Blackburn	129,200
21	Brighton	123,500
22	Derby	114,800
23	Preston	113,000
24	Norwich	111,700
25	Birkenhead	110,900
26	Gateshead	109,900
27	Plymouth	107,600
28	Halifax	104,900
29	Southampton	104,800
30	South Shields	100,900
31	Burnley	97,000
32	Huddersfield	95,000
33	Wolverhampton	94,200
34	Stockport	92,800
35	Middlesbrough	91,300
36	Northampton	87,000
37	Walsall	86,400
38	Hartlepool	85,400
39	St Helens	84,400
40	Rochdale	83,100

1921
Rank	Town	Pop'n
1	London	7,480,200
2	Birmingham	922,200
3	Liverpool	802,900
4	Manchester	730,000
5	Sheffield	490,600
6	Leeds	458,200
7	Bristol	377,000
8	Bradford	291,000
9	Hull	287,200
10	Newcastle	275,000
11	Nottingham	262,600
12	Portsmouth	247,300
13	Stoke-on-Trent	240,400
14	Leicester	234,100
15	Salford	234,000
16	Plymouth	210,000
17	Bolton	178,700
18	Southampton	161,000
19	Sunderland	159,100
20	Birkenhead	145,600
21	Oldham	145,000
22	Brighton	142,400
23	Middlesbrough	131,100
24	Derby	129,800
25	Coventry	128,200
26	Blackburn	126,600
27	Gateshead	125,100
28	Stockport	123,300
29	Wolverhampton	121,300
30	Norwich	120,700
31	South Shields	118,600
32	Preston	117,400
33	Huddersfield	110,100
34	Southend-on-Sea	106,000
35	Burnley	103,200
36	St Helens	102,600
37	Blackpool	99,600
38	Halifax	99,100
39	Walsall	96,900
40	Reading	92,300

1951
Rank	Town	Pop'n
1	London	8,348,000
2	Birmingham	1,112,700
3	Liverpool	788,700
4	Manchester	703,100
5	Sheffield	512,900
6	Leeds	505,200
7	Bristol	442,300
8	Nottingham	306,100
9	Hull	299,100
10	Bradford	292,400
11	Newcastle	291,700
12	Leicester	285,200
13	Stoke-on-Trent	275,100
14	Coventry	258,200
15	Portsmouth	233,500
16	Plymouth	209,000
17	Sunderland	181,500
18	Southampton	178,300
19	Salford	178,200
20	Bolton	167,200
21	Wolverhampton	162,700
22	Brighton	156,500
23	Southend-on-Sea	151,800
24	Middlesbrough	147,300
25	Blackpool	147,200
26	Bournemouth	144,700
27	Birkenhead	142,500
28	Stockport	141,700
29	Derby	141,300
30	Huddersfield	129,000
31	Oldham	121,300
32	Norwich	121,200
33	Preston	119,300
34	Gateshead	115,000
35	Walsall	114,500
36	Reading	114,200
37	Blackburn	111,200
38	St Helens	110,300
39	Luton	109,200
40	York	105,400

1971
Rank	Town	Pop'n
1	London	7,452,300
2	Birmingham	1,013,400
3	Liverpool	603,200
4	Manchester	543,800
5	Sheffield	516,000
6	Leeds	501,100
7	Bristol	426,200
8	Middlesbrough (Teesside)	395,500
9	Coventry	333,000
10	Nottingham	296,800
11	Bradford	294,500
12	Hull	284,700
13	Leicester	282,000
14	Wolverhampton	268,400
15	Stoke-on-Trent	263,600
16	Plymouth	246,900
17	Newcastle	221,400
18	Derby	219,300
19	Sunderland	215,700
20	Southampton	213,600
21	Portsmouth	204,300
22	Dudley	185,400
23	Walsall	184,400
24	West Bromwich	166,600
25	Brighton	163,900
26	Southend-on-Sea	162,400
27	Luton	160,700
28	Bolton	154,400
29	Blackpool	149,800
30	Bournemouth	149,000
31	Stockport	139,500
32	Birkenhead	138,100
33	Reading	133,400
34	Salford	131,300
35	Huddersfield	130,600
36	Northampton	126,300
37	Ipswich	122,700
38	Norwich	120,700
39	Oxford	110,600
40	Poole	106,600

1981
Rank	Town	Pop'n
1	London	7,566,600
2	Birmingham	1,014,000
3	Liverpool	538,800
4	Sheffield	470,700
5	Leeds	445,200
6	Manchester	437,600
7	Bristol	413,900
8	Leicester	324,400
9	Hull	322,100
10	Coventry	318,700
11	Bradford	293,300
12	Nottingham	273,300
13	Stoke-on-Trent	272,400
14	Wolverhampton	263,500
15	Plymouth	238,600
16	Derby	218,000
17	Southampton	211,300
18	Newcastle	199,100
19	Sunderland	195,100
20	Reading	194,700
21	Dudley	186,500
22	Walsall	177,900
23	Portsmouth	174,200
24	Norwich	169,800
25	Preston	166,700
26	Luton	163,200
27	Middlesbrough	158,200
28	Southend-on-Sea	155,700
29	Northampton	154,200
30	West Bromwich	153,700
31	Huddersfield	147,800
32	Blackpool	146,300
33	Bolton	144,000
34	Bournemouth	142,800
35	Stockport	135,500
36	Brighton	134,600
37	Ipswich	129,700
38	Swindon	127,300
39	York	123,100
40	Poole	122,800

1991
Rank	Town	Pop'n
1	London	6,679,700
2	Birmingham	1,040,000
3	Liverpool	452,500
4	Sheffield	445,000
5	Leeds	432,000
6	Manchester	404,900
7	Bristol	367,000
8	Coventry	292,500
9	Leicester	280,000
10	Bradford	274,000
11	Nottingham	262,000
12	Newcastle	259,500
13	Stoke-on-Trent	245,000
14	Hull	242,000
15	Wolverhampton	237,000
16	Plymouth	236,000
17	Derby	214,000
18	Southampton	192,000
19	Sunderland	192,000
20	Dudley	186,000
21	Portsmouth	173,000
22	Walsall	171,000
23	Norwich	170,000
24	Northampton	166,000
25	Luton	165,000
26	Southend-on-Sea	154,000
27	Milton Keynes	148,000
28	Blackpool	145,000
29	Reading	142,900
30	Bolton	142,000
31	Middlesbrough	140,000
32	West Bromwich	140,000
33	Preston	140,000
34	Brighton	132,000
35	Stockport	130,000
36	Poole	130,000
37	Peterborough	129,000
38	Huddersfield	122,000
39	Ipswich	116,000
40	Telford	115,000

== See also ==
- List of towns and cities in England by population
- Demographics of England - for the population of England at various points in history.
- List of lost settlements in the United Kingdom
