= Emmanuel Church, Preston =

Anglican Church in Lancashire, England

Coordinates: 53.7692°N 2.7125°W

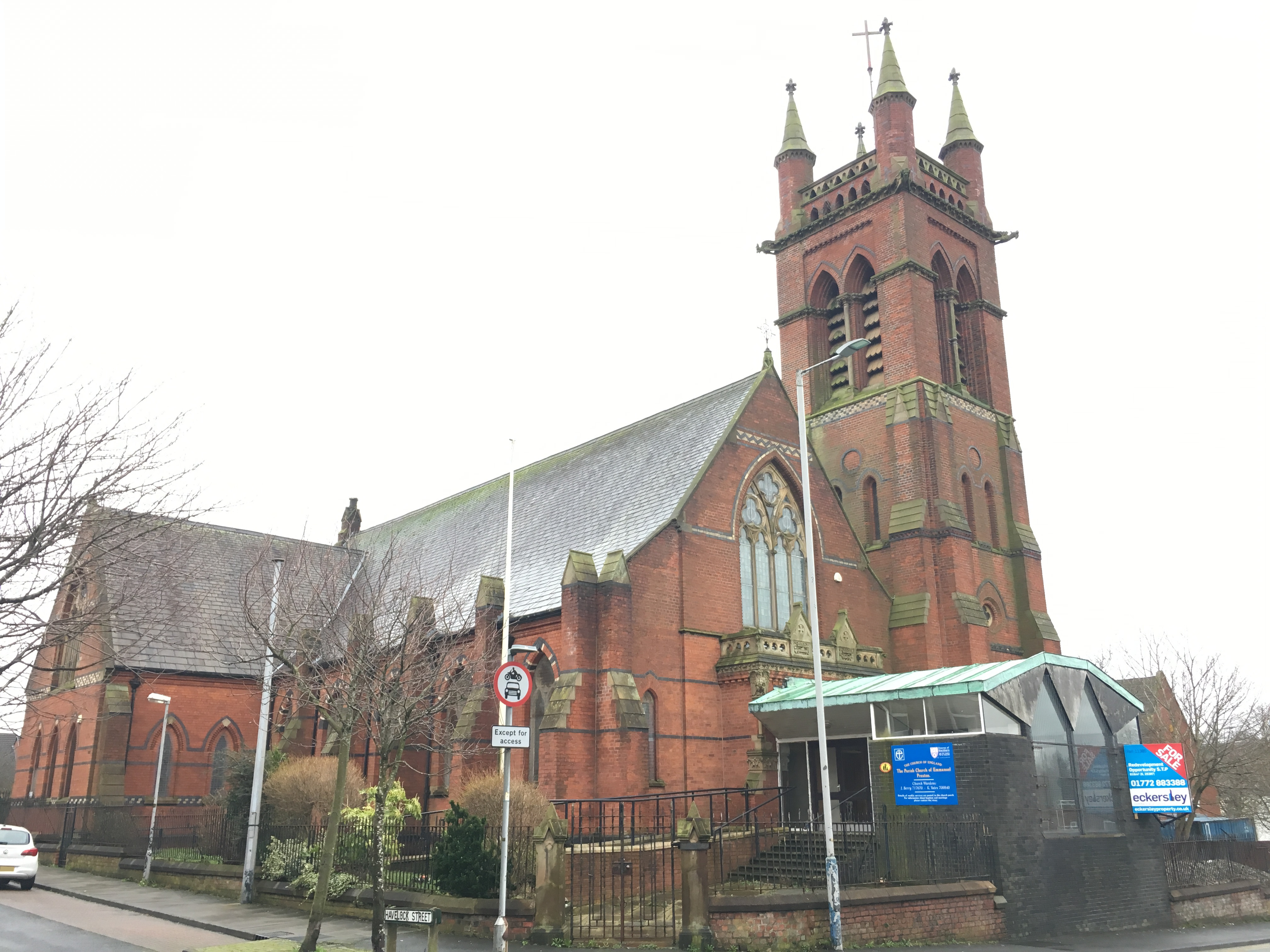
- Emmanuel Church, Preston

- Location in Preston
- OS grid reference: SD 531 306
- Location: Brook Street, Preston, Lancashire
- Country: England
- Denomination: Anglican
- Website: Emmanuel, Preston

History
- Status: Parish church

Architecture
- Functional status: Active
- Heritage designation: Grade II
- Designated: 20 December 1991
- Architect(s): Myres, Veevers and Myres
- Architectural type: Church
- Style: Gothic Revival
- Groundbreaking: 1869; 157 years ago
- Completed: 1870; 156 years ago
- Construction cost: c. £6,000

Specifications
- Materials: Brick with stone dressings, slate roofs

Administration
- Province: York Vicar = Matthew Robinson
- Diocese: Blackburn
- Archdeaconry: Lancaster
- Deanery: Preston
- Parish: Emmanuel, Preston

Emmanuel Church is in Brook Street, Preston, Lancashire, England. It is in the deanery of Preston, the archdeaconry of Lancaster, and the diocese of Blackburn. The church is recorded in the National Heritage List for England as a designated Grade II listed building.

== History ==
Emmanuel Church was built between 1869 and 1870 and was designed by Myres, Veevers and Myres. The land for the church was given by Thomas Tomlinson of London, and the foundation stone was laid on 18 August 1868 by Sir T. G. Fermor-Hesketh, the local Member of Parliament. The church cost about £6,000, and when first built could seat 1,000 people.

== Architecture ==
The church is built in red brick with some decoration in blue, black and white brick, and has sandstone dressings and slate roofs. It is in a mixture of Early English and Decorated architectural styles. The church consists of a five-bay nave without aisles, north and south transepts, and a chancel. Attached to the east sides of the transepts are vestries, each with an apse, and at the southwest corner is a tower. At the corners of the lower stages of the tower are angle buttresses, and the top stage has corner pilasters. In the lower stages are lancets and small circular windows, and in the top stage are paired bell openings. At the top of the tower is a carved band, corner gargoyles in the form of winged beasts, a parapet consisting of two pierced bands, the lower in brick and the upper in stone, and octagonal corner pinnacles.

At the west front is a rectangular porch with stone carving, including a pierced parapet containing two inscribed tablets with triangular heads. In front of the porch is a modern glazed extension. Above the porch is a four-light window, over which is a polychrome band with zig-zag decoration. Along the sides of the church the bays are divided by buttresses, and each bay contains a two-light window. In the transepts are small lancet windows, and each transept has a large four-light window in the gable. The chancel has a five-light east window. The windows contain Geometrical tracery. Inside the church is a hammerbeam roof, and the transepts contain galleries. The three-manual pipe organ was built in 1874, possibly by Ainscough of Preston, and was renovated in 1912 by R. G. Phillips of Preston.

== Building closure ==
In 2014, due to dry rot affecting the building, the congregation stopped using the church building and moved to the adjacent community centre. The building was formally closed two years later in February 2016 but the Church continues to meet for worship and other activities in the Plungington Community Centre.

== See also ==
- Listed buildings in Preston, Lancashire
- https://www.emmanuelpreston.org.uk/
