= The Time Is Near =

Studio album by Keef Hartley Band
- Released: September 1970
- Recorded: December 1969; April–May 1970
- Studio: Trident Studios, London; Morgan Studios, London
- Genre: Blues rock
- Length: 35:08
- Label: Deram
- Producer: Neil Slaven and Keef Hartley

Keef Hartley Band chronology
The Battle of North West Six (1969)	The Time Is Near (1970)	Overdog (1971)

Professional ratings
Review scores
Source	Rating
Allmusic	4/5 stars
Encyclopedia of Popular Music	4/5 stars

The Time Is Near is the third album by the Keef Hartley Band, released in 1970. Its cover art includes a rendition of the 1908 Cyrus Dallin statue Appeal to the Great Spirit.

== Track listing ==
=== 1970 LP ===
Deram SML 1071 (UK), DES 18047 (US)

All songs written by Miller Anderson, except "Premonition", written by Dave Caswell

1. "Morning Rain" – 3:00
2. "From The Window" – 3:28
3. "The Time Is Near" – 10:09
4. "You Can't Take It With You" – 7:19
5. "Premonition" – 4:24
6. "Another Time, Another Place" – 2:35
7. "Change" – 4:00

Tracks 1, 7 recorded at Trident Studios in December 1969
Tracks 2–6 recorded at Morgan Studios in April and May 1970

=== 2005 CD reissue ===
Eclectic Discs ECLDCD 1027
Same track listing as the 1970 LP

== Personnel ==
=== Keef Hartley Band ===
- Keef Hartley – drums, percussion
- Miller Anderson – vocals, acoustic guitar, electric guitar
- Henry Lowther – trumpet, flugelhorn, violin, piano, brass arrangements (tracks 1, 7)
- Gary Thain – bass guitar
- Dave Caswell – flugelhorn, euphonium, trumpet, electric piano, brass arrangements (tracks 2–6)
- Lyle Jenkins – tenor saxophone, flute, baritone saxophone (tracks 2–6)

=== Additional musicians ===
- Jim Jewell – tenor saxophone (tracks 1, 7)
- Stewart Wicks – piano, organ (tracks 2, 3)
- Del Roll – percussion (track 7)

=== Technical ===
- Keef Hartley, Neil Slaven – producers
- Robin Black – engineer, Morgan Studios
- Peter Flanagan – assistant engineer, Morgan Studios
- Colin Caldwell – engineer, Trident Studios
- Keef Hartley – album design
