= Ronkswood =

Suburb in Worcestershire, England

Coordinates: 52.182803°N 2.193116°W

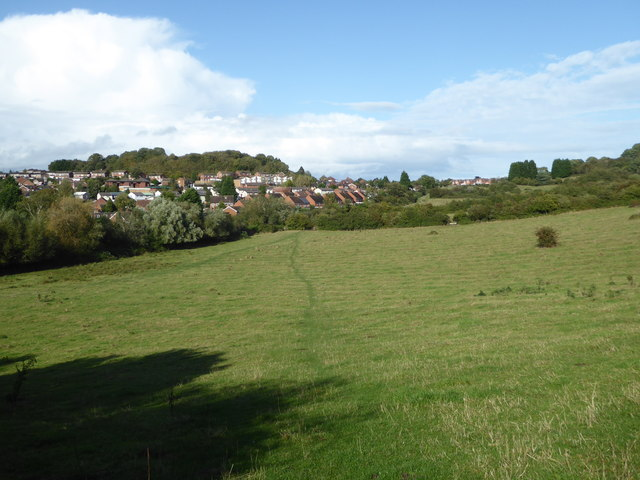
- Ronkswood Hill Meadows, Ronkswood, Worcester

- Location within Worcestershire
  - London: 133 mi (214 km) SE
- District: Worcester
- Shire county: Worcestershire
- Region: West Midlands
- Country: England
- Sovereign state: United Kingdom
- Post town: Worcester
- Postcode district: WR5
- Dialling code: 01905
- Police: West Mercia
- Fire: Hereford and Worcester
- Ambulance: West Midlands
- UK Parliament: Worcester

Ronkswood is an inner-city suburb of Worcester in Worcestershire, England. It is one mile east of the city centre, centered on Newtown Road (B4636). Much of the Ronkswood housing estate was built in the late 1940s.

== Housing and amenities ==
Medway Road and Canterbury Road are the locations of large, modern suburban housing developments. There are two pubs in the area. Local schools include Perry Wood Primary & Nursery School (formerly Ronkswood Infant, Nursery and Junior Schools).

There was a local church, Worcester Holy Trinity and St Matthew's, that was built in 1965. The building was closed in December 2012 and subsequently demolished in 2015 after a partial ceiling collapse, although the church organisation continues.

There is also a Salvation Army Centre in Ronkswood, which opened in August 2007. In February 2006 part of the local shopping area in Lichfield Road is a designated alcohol-free zone because of antisocial behaviour.

== Worcestershire Royal Hospital ==
Ronkswood was the site of the former main hospital in Worcester. The new Worcestershire Royal Hospital is now nearer the motorway, close to Warndon Villages and leads off Charles Hastings Way. As the former hospital site has been left disused, it is common for travellers to set up camp. The site has been acquired by commercial Property Developer Robert Hitchins Ltd for the creation of High Point Business Park.

== Transport ==
First Midland Red has traditionally operated the majority of bus services in Worcester, including the Ronkswood area. Diamond Bus started operations in competition with First Midland Red on 1 September 2009. First used to operate a night service to Ronkswood in 2002.
