= Raphaël Faÿs =

French musician

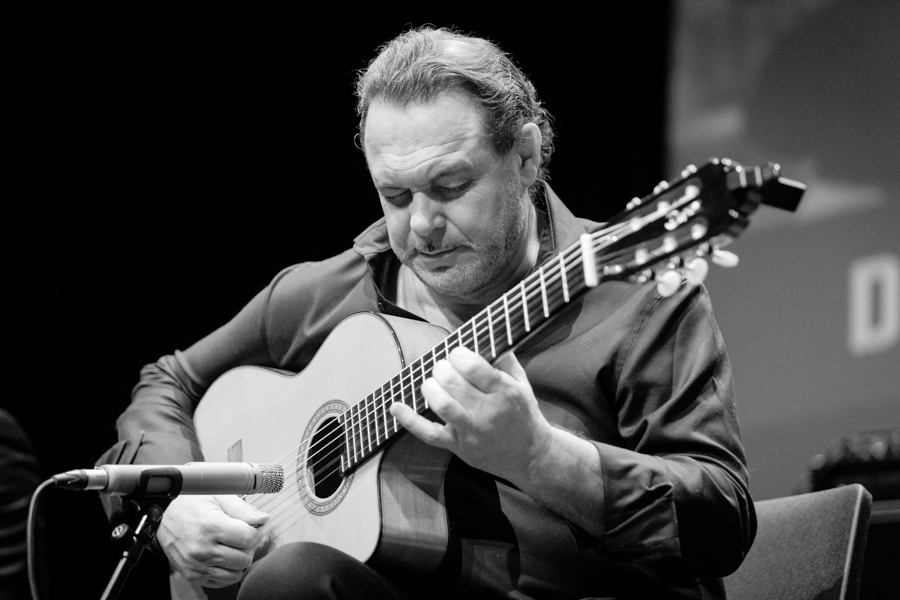
Raphaël Faÿs in 2019.

Raphaël Faÿs is a French gypsy jazz and classical guitarist and composer who was born in Paris on 10 December 1959.

== Discography ==
- Gitarre, spielt Kompositionen von Marcel Dadi (Decca, 1976)
- Raphael Fays (Sonopresse, 1978)
- Gipsy New Horizon (Sonopresse, 1979)
- Night in Caravan (WEA, 1980)
- Vivi Swing (WEA, 1982)
- Bonjour Gipsy (WEA, 1983)
- La Musique de Django (Ariola, 1985)
- Djangology (Carrere, 1987)
- Voyages (Ricordu, 1989)
- Gipsy Touch (Ricordu, 1991)
- Sans Domicile Fixe (GHA, 1996)
- Jazz Hot: The Gipsy Way (Mandala, 2000)
- Guitar Romance (Royal River Music, 2003)
- Swing Guitar (Le Chant du Monde, 2005)
- Andalucia (Le Chant du Monde, 2006)
- Django & Classic (Le Chant du Monde, 2006)
- Django's Works (Le Chant du Monde, 2010)
- Django et Rien D'Autre! (Le Chant du Monde, 2010)
- Circulo de La Noche (Ouest, 2015)
- Paris Seville. Bois de Guitare: Madera de Guitarra (Fremeaux, 2018)
