= List of primary urban areas in England by population (2001 data) =

The UK government introduced the concept of a primary urban area as a defining characteristic for substantial settlements, using the shorthand term 'city' for them, whether or not they had formal city status. In reality, a PUA may contain multiple settlements, even multiple cities. It should not be confused with 'urban areas' or 'built-up areas' that are more rigorously defined by the Office for National Statistics – or even city status.

Historically, the boundaries of cities within England and the United Kingdom as a whole have remained largely undefined, leading to difficulties in comparisons between them. However, a definitive list of cities in the United Kingdom, which in itself would constitute a type of definition known as an Extensional definition (specifically, an enumerative definition) does exist, though it does not define the limits of these cities. To allow such comparisons to be made the Office of the Deputy Prime Minister, in conjunction with other Government departments, began compiling reports and a database to allow comparison of the English cities. This report is known as the State of the English Cities Report and was maintained by the Department for Communities and Local Government.

Using this definition the term "city" is used as a primary urban area, which is distinct from the Office for National Statistics urban area agglomerations, with a total population in excess of 125,000. The population figures are based on the cumulative total population of the constituent wards. This list is not the same as the list of local authorities which have been granted city status and is intended to define the physical extent of the largest urban centres. These are available from the State of the Cities Database.

However, some controversy arose when using these terms, for example the Manchester PUA contains the City of Manchester and also includes that of the City of Salford which is a metropolitan borough and has held city status since 1926. The inclusion of the City of Wolverhampton and the Black Country in the Birmingham PUA also led to a meeting of the West Midlands group of MPs where their displeasure was made clear to David Miliband, then the minister in charge. This inclusion of Wolverhampton demonstrates differences between PUAs and the Eurostat equivalent, where Wolverhampton has its own larger urban zone.

Rank	Primary urban area	Population (2001 census)	Constituent local authorities	LUZ name	LUZ size	LUZ EU rank
1	London	8,294,058	Greater London, Epping Forest, Broxbourne, Dacorum, Three Rivers, Watford, Dartford, Gravesham, Elmbridge, Epsom and Ewell, Mole Valley, Runnymede, Spelthorne and Woking	London	12,208,100	1
2	Birmingham	2,293,099	Cities of Birmingham and Wolverhampton, Metropolitan Boroughs of Dudley, Walsall, Sandwell and Solihull	Birmingham	2,284,093	21
3	Manchester	1,741,961	Cities of Manchester and Salford; Metropolitan Boroughs of Tameside, Trafford, Bury, Oldham, Bolton, Rochdale, Wigan and Stockport	Manchester	2,732,854	23
4	Liverpool	830,112	Liverpool, Metropolitan Borough of Knowsley and Metropolitan Borough of St Helens	Liverpool	1,365,900	41
5	Leeds	750,700	Leeds	Leeds	1,499,465	37
6	Sheffield	551,800	Sheffield and Rotherham	Sheffield	1,277,100	46
7	Teesside	472,200	Includes Middlesbrough, Redcar and Cleveland and Stockton-on-Tees	n/a	n/a	n/a
8	Bristol	428,234	Bristol	Bristol	1,006,600	64
9	Bournemouth and Poole	382,536	Bournemouth, Christchurch and Poole	n/a	n/a	n/a
10	Stoke-on-Trent	360,810	Includes the towns of Newcastle-under-Lyme and Kidsgrove	n/a	n/a	n/a
11	Leicester	329,600	Leicester, Blaby and Oadby and Wigston	Leicester	887,000	75
12	Wirral	331,232	Wirral, Birkenhead and Ellesmere Port and Neston	Liverpool	1,365,900	41
13	Coventry	350,900	Coventry	Coventry	651,000	97
14	Nottingham	303,900	Nottingham	Nottingham	825,600	82
15	Bradford	293,717	Metropolitan Borough of Bradford	Leeds	1,499,465	37
16	Newcastle	279,100	Newcastle Upon Tyne	Newcastle Upon Tyne	1,055,600	59
17	Bolton	277,300	Metropolitan Borough of Bolton	Manchester	2,732,854	23
18	Brighton and Hove	273,400	Brighton and Hove	n/a	n/a	n/a
19	Plymouth	256,384	Plymouth	n/a	n/a	n/a
20	Hull	256,100	Kingston upon Hull	Kingston upon Hull	573,300	113
21	Preston	252,209	Includes the towns of Leyland and Chorley	n/a	n/a	n/a
22	Derby	248,700	Derby	Nottingham	825,600	82
23	Aldershot and Farnborough	248,208	Includes the towns of Aldershot, Badshot Lea, Blackwater, Camberley, Deepcut, Farnborough, Farnham, Frimley, Sandhurst and Yateley	n/a	n/a	n/a
24	Southampton	239,700	Southampton	n/a	n/a	n/a
25	Wigan	237,360	Metropolitan Borough of Wigan	n/a	n/a	n/a
26	Barnsley	211,807	Metropolitan Borough of Barnsley	Leeds	1,499,465	37
27	Portsmouth	205,400	Includes the towns of Gosport, Waterlooville, Havant, Fareham and Portchester	n/a	n/a	n/a
28	Luton	203,600	Luton & Dunstable	n/a	n/a	n/a
29	York	202,400	York	n/a	n/a	n/a
30	Northampton	200,092	Northampton	n/a	n/a	n/a
31	Milton Keynes	186,949	Milton Keynes	n/a	n/a	n/a
32	Worthing	182,817	Worthing, part of Adur, part of Arun. All the towns in the Brighton/Worthing/Littlehampton conurbation are split into two PUA's, Brighton and Worthing	n/a	n/a	n/a
33	Ipswich	180,000	Includes the towns of Felixstowe and Woodbridge	n/a	n/a	n/a
34	Crawley	179,987	Reigate and Banstead and Crawley	n/a	n/a	n/a
35	Sunderland	177,739	Sunderland, Tyne and Wear	Newcastle Upon Tyne	1,055,600	59
36	Southend-on-Sea	174,300	Southend-on-Sea	n/a	n/a	n/a
37	Rochdale	166,932	Metropolitan Borough of Rochdale	Manchester	2,732,854	23
38	Warrington	215391	Warrington North, Warrington South	Warrington	215391	41
39	Mansfield	158,496	Ashfield and Mansfield	Nottingham	825,600	82
40	Swindon	155,970	Swindon	n/a	n/a	n/a
41	Reading	155,300	Reading, Berkshire	n/a	n/a	n/a
42	Blackburn	147,700	Blackburn with Darwen	n/a	n/a	n/a
43	Burnley	146,419	Burnley and Pendle	n/a	n/a	n/a
44	Huddersfield	146,234	Kirklees	Leeds	1,499,465	37
45	Oxford	145,095	Oxford	n/a	n/a	n/a
46	Wakefield	144,654	Wakefield	Leeds	1,499,465	37
47	Blackpool	142,100	Blackpool	n/a	n/a	n/a
48	Norwich	130,000	Norwich & Broadlands	n/a	n/a	n/a
49	Grimsby	139,458	North East Lincolnshire	Kingston upon Hull	573,300	113
50	Telford	139,071	Telford and Wrekin	n/a	n/a	n/a
51	Peterborough	136,963	Peterborough	n/a	n/a	n/a
52	Gloucester	135,845	Gloucester	n/a	n/a	n/a
53	Cambridge	131,144	Cambridge	n/a	n/a	n/a
54	Doncaster	127,851	Doncaster	n/a	n/a	n/a
55	Hastings	125,524	Hastings	n/a	n/a	n/a
