= The Blues Alone =

Studio album by John Mayall
- Released: November 1967
- Recorded: May 1, 1967
- Studio: Decca Studios, West Hampstead, London
- Genre: Blues
- Length: 40:35 (original), 46:51 (2006 CD)
- Label: Ace of Clubs Records (UK, manufactured by Decca Records); 2006: Remastered to CD with bonus tracks on Decca Records label.
- Producer: John Mayall, Mike Vernon

John Mayall chronology
Crusade (1967)	The Blues Alone (1967)	Bare Wires (1968)

Professional ratings
Review scores
Source	Rating
AllMusic	3/5 stars
The Penguin Guide to Blues Recordings	2.5/4 stars

The Blues Alone is a 1967 electric blues album recorded by John Mayall on which he recorded all the parts himself, with the exception of percussion which was provided by longtime collaborator Keef Hartley.

The cover art and the original LP sleeve design are by John Mayall. Sleeve notes, including track notes, were written by noted DJ John Peel. The following quote is of interest regarding the album concept.

I was featuring his LP A Hard Road on the air and was amazed that, in addition to writing 8 of the 12 numbers on the record, playing 5 and 9 string guitar, organ, piano, harmonica and singing, he had written the sleeve notes and painted the portrait of the group on the front cover.
With this new LP, he has carried all of this to its logical conclusion and has produced a record featuring no other musician than himself except for the occasional aid of his drummer Keef Hartley.

== Notable tracks ==
- "Down the Line" is a sparse lament featuring vocals over a cold-sounding slide guitar and piano accompaniment.
- "Sonny Boy Blow" is a harmonica-driven boogie tribute to the then-recently deceased Sonny Boy Williamson.
- "Marsha's Mood" is a slow, deliberate and passionate piano solo constructed over a descending bass figure.
- "No More Tears" features rare examples of Mayall's solo lead guitar playing.
- "Catch That Train" is a "train" harmonica solo over accelerating rhythms provided by a recorded steam locomotive beginning a journey.
- "Harp Man" is also an instrumental, adding celesta to the more traditional blues instruments of harmonica and bass. In the sleeve notes, John Peel commented: "There is no truth to the rumours that the Bluesbreakers will be using dulcimer, sackbut and psaltery. Let's face it, guttural cries of "Let's hear your sackbut, son!" can only lead to violence." In fact the instrument had previously been used in jazz and piano boogie pieces by artists such as Meade Lux Lewis.
- "Brown Sugar" is another slide guitar piece, not related to the famous Rolling Stones track of the same name, although both songs use the expression to mean the same thing.
- The slow, tender track "Broken Wings", accompanied by organ, elicited particular praise from Peel. The song was covered by Atomic Rooster on their debut album.

== Track listings ==
=== Original LP ===
All songs by John Mayall

==== A side ====
- 1. "Brand New Start" – 3:27
- 2. "Please Don't Tell" – 2:33
- 3. "Down the Line" – 3:44
- 4. "Sonny Boy Blow" – 3:50
- 5. "Marsha's Mood" – 3:15
- 6. "No More Tears" – 3:12

==== B side ====
- 7. "Catch That Train" – 2:19
- 8. "Cancelling Out" – 4:20
- 9. "Harp Man" – 2:44
- 10. "Brown Sugar" – 3:44
- 11. "Broken Wings" – 4:16
- 12. "Don't Kick Me" – 3:11

=== 2006 Remastered CD ===
- 13. "Brand New Start" (First version) – 3:02
- 14. "Marsha's Mood" (First version) – 3:17

== Personnel ==
- John Mayall – vocals, guitars (6- and 9-string), harmonica, piano, organ, celeste (track 9), drums (tracks 1, 5)
- Keef Hartley – drums (tracks 2, 4, 6, 8, 9, 10, 11, 12)
