= Plungington =

District of Lancashire, England

Coordinates: 53°46′13″N 2°42′41″W

Plungington is a district of Preston, Lancashire, England, to the northwest of the city centre. Historically, it was an area of working-class terraced housing dating from the late 1880s. It was redeveloped by the Central Lancashire Development Corporation, into a mix of improved housing, new-built housing, and industrial units. The former school building became a local community centre. The local pub, The Plungington, underwent a substantial makeover in 2025.

Plungington is a ward for elections to Preston City Council, electing three councillors.

Emmanuel Church in Plungington is a grade II listed building but was closed for health and safety reasons in 2014. The congregation meets for worship in the adjacent community centre. A Community land trust has been established with the aim of bringing the church building back into use including the creation of 14 flats.

Parts of the area particularly to the south closer to the city centre have now become home to many students from the University of Central Lancashire.

Plungington Road, which changes its name beyond Aqueduct Street to Adelphi Street, also crosses the main Preston-Blackpool road, the A5085.

== See also ==
- Student ghetto
