= Mick Weaver =

English musician (born 1944)

- Also known as: Wynder K. Frog
- Born: Michael Weaver; 16 June 1944 (age 82); Bolton, Lancashire, England
- Genres: Rock; melodic rock; blues rock; progressive rock
- Occupation: Musician
- Instrument: Keyboards
- Years active: 1960s–present

Mick Weaver (born 16 June 1944, Bolton, Lancashire, England) is an English session musician, best known for his playing of the Hammond B3 organ.

== Career ==
Weaver's band performed as Wynder K. Frog and became popular on the student union and club circuit of the mid 1960s. A brief merging of this band with Herbie Goins and the Night-Timers took his work to a higher level. Wynder K. Frogg — they are billed under this spelling — appeared on the bill at the Saville Theatre, London on 24 September 1967, supporting Traffic on their first UK presentation. Also on the bill were Jackie Edwards and Nirvana. The compere was David Symonds.

When Steve Winwood left Traffic to form Blind Faith, Weaver was recruited to replace him and Traffic became Mason, Capaldi, Wood and Frog, soon shortened to Wooden Frog. They played a few gigs before dissolving three months later when Traffic reformed. After this he recorded with solo artists such as Buddy Guy, Dave Gilmour, Joe Cocker, Eric Burdon, Frankie Miller, Roger Chapman, Steve Marriott and Gary Moore as well as Taj Mahal and The Blues Band, also playing keyboards with Steve Marriott's Majik Mijits.

== Discography ==
=== As Wynder K. Frog ===
==== Sunshine Super Frog (1967) ====
Sunshine Super Frog

Studio album by Wynder K. Frog
- Released: December 1967
- Genre: Rock
- Label: Island
- Producer: Jimmy Miller

===== Credits =====
All tracks featured Mick Weaver as Wynder K. Frog, playing a Hammond B3 organ and were recorded in London playing over backing tapes by unnamed session musicians from New York City. In the album liner notes Jimmy Miller noted that Weaver had "supplemented the band with trumpet, tenor sax, guitar, bass and drums, Wynder has transformed the organ into a highly enjoyable medium of sound, combining jazzy finesse with popular and commercial phrasing suitable for vast appeal".

Side One
No.	Title	Length
1.	"Sunshine Superman" (Donovan Leitch)	2:34
2.	"I Feel So Bad" (Jackie Edwards)	2:25
3.	"Oh Mary" (Jackie Edwards)	2:33
4.	"Blues For a Frog" (Syd Dale)	3:03
5.	"Somebody Help Me" (Jackie Edwards)	2:44
6.	"Mercy" (R. Harris)	1:55

Side two
No.	Title	Length
7.	"Hold On, I'm Comin'" (Isaac Hayes, David Porter)	2:11
8.	"Shook, Shimmy and Shake" (Owen Gray)	2:12
9.	"Insense" (Fallon-Miller)	2:27
10.	"Walking to New Orleans" (Fats Domino, Dave Bartholomew, Guidry)	2:00
11.	"Don't Fight It (Feel it)" (Wilson Pickett, Steve Cropper)	2:20
12.	"Dancin' Frog" (Jimmy Miller)	2:29

==== Out of the Frying Pan (1968) ====
Out of the Frying Pan

Studio album by Wynder K. Frog
- Released: August 1968
- Genre: Rock
- Label: United Artists
- Producers: Gus Dudgeon, Jimmy Miller

===== Credits =====
- Mick Weaver – keyboards
- Dick Heckstall-Smith – saxophone
- Neil Hubbard – guitar
- Alan Spenner – bass
- Chris Mercer – saxophone
- Bruce Rowland – drums
- Ron Carthy – horn
- Rebop Kwaku Baah – percussion

Side one
No.	Title	Length
1.	"Jumpin' Jack Flash" (Mick Jagger & Keith Richards)	4:03
2.	"Gasoline Alley" (Mick Weaver)	3:02
3.	"Willie and the Hand Jive" (Johnny Otis)	2:21
4.	"Harpsichord Shuffle" (Mick Weaver)	3:55
5.	"Baby I Love You" (Ronnie Shannon)	2:44
6.	"This Here" (Bobby Timmons)	6:21

Side two
No.	Title	Length
7.	"Green Door" (Bob Davie, Marvin Moore)	2:25
8.	"Bad Eye" (Willie Mitchell)	2:35
9.	"Alexander's Ragtime Band" (Irving Berlin)	3:34
10.	"Tequila" (Chuck Rio)	1:55
11.	"The House That Jack Built" (Alan Price)	2:30
12.	"Hymn To Freedom" (Harriette Hamilton, Oscar Peterson)	4:16
13.	"Hi-Heel Sneakers" (Tommy Tucker)	3:34

==== Into the Fire (1970) ====
Into the Fire

Studio album by Wynder K. Frog
- Released: 1970
- Genre: Rock
- Label: United Artists

Into the Fire was released only in the US, after the band had dissolved. Unlike the previous albums of mostly covers, the liner notes here state that the songs were, "composed specifically for the Frog style of musical interpretation, ranging far in beat, tempo and mood".

===== Credits =====
- Mick Weaver – keyboards
- Rocky Dzidzornu – percussion
- Neil Hubbard – guitar
- Chris Mercer – saxophone
- Shawn Phillips – guitar and vocals (on "Eddie's Tune" only)
- Bruce Rowland – drums
- Alan Spenner – bass

Side one
No.	Title	Length
1.	"Into the Fire" (M. Weaver, C. Mercer)	4:09
2.	"Howl in Wolf's Clothing" (M. Weaver)	3:28
3.	"F in Blues" (M. Weaver, C. Mercer)	5:44
4.	"Cool Hand Stanley" (N. Hubbard, C. Mercer, M. Weaver)	5:39

Side two
No.	Title	Length
5.	"Eddie's Tune" (N. Hubbard, S. Phillips, M. Weaver)	5:26
6.	"Why am I Treated so Bad" (R. Staples)	4:59
7.	"Hot Salt Beef" (N. Hubbard, C. Mercer, M. Weaver)	4:59
8.	"Warm and Tender Love" (B.Robinson)	4:08

In 2018, RPM/Cherry Red Records released a triple-CD box set, entitled Wynder K. Frog. Shook, Shimmy and Shake. The Complete Recordings 1966–1970, including all the above recordings, plus 12 bonus tracks, previously unissued. There were four on the second CD and nine on the third CD, and a 26 page booklet with extensive liner notes and photos. The bonus tracks on the second CD are: 14. "Jumping' Jack Flash" (Mono Version); 15. "Baldy"; 16. "Dancing Frog" (Stereo Version); and 17. "Blues For A Frog" (Stereo Version). On the third CD, the bonus tracks are: 9. "Happy Jack"; 10. "We Can Work It Out"; 11. "Funky Broadway"; 12. "Loving You Is Sweeter Than Ever"; 13. "A Memory Of Bruce"; 14. "The House That Jack Built"; 15. "I'll Go Crazy"; 16. "Tequila"; 17. "Baldy".

=== As a session musician ===
1969	Fiends and Angels – Martha Veléz
1970	Battle of North West Six – Keef Hartley Band; Contribution – Shawn Phillips; Jesus Christ Superstar – Original Cast Recording
1971	Bright City – Miller Anderson; Overdog – Keef Hartley
1972	Pieces – Juicy Lucy; Seventy Second Brave – Keef Hartley
1973	Lancashire Hustler – Keef Hartley; Mick Cox Band – Mick Cox; Was That Alright Then – Tony Hazzard
1974	Butts Band – Butts Band; Delicious & Refreshing – Coast Road Drive; Jess Roden Band – Jess Roden; Spider Jiving – Andy Fairweather Low; Storey – Mike Storey
1975	Amazing Grease – The Grease Band; Mind Your Own Business – Henry McCullough; Rock – Frankie Miller
1976	Be Bop 'N' Holla – Andy Fairweather Low
1977	Good Rockin' Tonite – Memphis Bend; Natural Avenue – John Lodge; Slide Away the Screen – Ralph McTell
1978	Andy Desmond – Andy Desmond; David Gilmour – David Gilmour; Just Easy – Alexis Korner; Rocket Fuel – Alvin Lee; Too Much Is Not Enough – Charlie Ainley
1979	Siamese Friends – Iain Matthews
1980	Darkness Darkness – Eric Burdon
1981	Love's Melodies – The Searchers
1982	Brand Loyalty – The Blues Band
1983	Farewell Song – Janis Joplin; Mixed – Iain Sutherland
1989	Seconds to Midnight – Steve Marriott
1990	He Knows the Blues – Otis Grand; Still Got the Blues – Gary Moore
1991	Damn Right, I've Got the Blues – Buddy Guy
1992	Best of Matthews' Southern Comfort; Under No Obligation – Roger Chapman
1993	Dancing the Blues – Taj Mahal; Feels Like Rain – Buddy Guy
1994	Ain't Enough Comin' In – Otis Rush
1995	21st Century Blues...From da 'Hood – Chris Thomas; Red Blooded Blues – Various Artists
1996	Phantom Blues – Taj Mahal; Seattle Years 1978–1984 – Iain Matthews
1997	Blues Sessions (1990–94) – Otis Grand; Chronicles – The Grease Band; Senor Blues – Taj Mahal; Tibetan Freedom Concert – Various Artists
1998	Chicago Blues Tour – Various Artists; Rock and Roll Doctor: Lowell George Tribute – Various Artists
1999	Back on Track – Arthur Adams; In My Own Time (Live) – Roger Chapman
2000	Best of the Private Years – Various Artists; Legendary Majik Mijits – Ronnie Lane & Steve Marriott
2001	Organ-Ized: All-Star Tribute to the Hammond B3 Organ – Various Artists; Shoutin' in Key – The Phantom Blues Band; Soul Deeper... Songs From the Deep South – Jimmy Barnes; Nuggets, Vol. 2: Original Artifacts From the British – Various Artists; Rampart Street Rhumba: Hannibal in New Orleans – Various Artists
2003	Live at the W.C. Handy Blues Awards, Vol. 1 – Various Artists; Martin Scorsese Presents the Blues – Taj Mahal
2004	Be My Guest – The Blues Band; Wide Eyed and Legless: The A&M Recordings – Andy Fairweather Low
2005	Damn Right, I've Got the Blues with bonus tracks – Buddy Guy; Essential – Taj Mahal; Hammond Heroes: 60s R&B Organ Grooves – Various Artists; Overdog with bonus tracks – Keef Hartley; Stealin' Home/Siamese Friends – Iain Matthews
2006	Box Set – Ralph McTell; JB50 – Jimmy Barnes; Can't Quit the Blues – Buddy Guy; Riding on the Crest of a Slump/Why Not? – Ellis
2008	Maestro – Taj Mahal

== Bibliography ==
- Joynson, Vernon. The Tapestry of Delights – The Comprehensive Guide to British Music of the Beat, R&B, Psychedelic and Progressive Eras 1963–1976. Borderline (2006). Reprinted (2008). ISBN 1-899855-15-7
- Paolo Hewitt John Hellier (2004). Steve Marriott: All Too Beautiful.... Helter Skelter Publishing ISBN 1-900924-44-7
