= Settlements in ceremonial counties of England by population =

This list article collates links to each ceremonial county's settlements population page, and the largest settlement in the county.

See the List of United Kingdom county nicknames article for the abbreviations used.

B	Bedfordshire, Berkshire, Bristol, Buckinghamshire
C	Cambridgeshire, Cheshire, City of London, Cornwall, Cumbria
D	Derbyshire, Devon, Dorset, (County) Durham
E	East Sussex, East Riding of Yorkshire, Essex
G	Gloucestershire, Greater London, Greater Manchester
H	Hampshire, Herefordshire, Hertfordshire
I	Isle of Wight
K	Kent
L	Lancashire, Leicestershire, Lincolnshire
M	Merseyside
N	Norfolk, North Yorkshire, Northamptonshire, Northumberland, Nottinghamshire
O	Oxfordshire
R	Rutland
S	Shropshire, Somerset, South Yorkshire, Staffordshire, Suffolk, Surrey
T	Tyne and Wear
W	Warwickshire, West Midlands, West Sussex, West Yorkshire, Wiltshire, Worcestershire

- The links in both the table and map redirect to the same article.

== Largest built-up area by county ==
County	Largest settlement	Its 2021 Pop.	Classed as
Bedfordshire	Luton	233,525	Major
Berkshire	Reading	203,795	Major
Bristol	Bristol	425,215	Major
Buckinghamshire	Milton Keynes	197,340	Large
Cambridgeshire	Peterborough	190,605	Large
Cheshire	Warrington	174,970	Large
City of London	City of London	8,583	Small
Cornwall	Newquay	24,545	Medium
Cumbria	Carlisle	77,730	Large
Derbyshire	Derby	275,575	Major
Devon	Plymouth	266,955	Major
Dorset	Bournemouth	196,455	Large
Durham	Darlington	93,015	Large
East Sussex	Brighton and Hove	277,105	Major
East Riding of Yorkshire	Kingston upon Hull	270,810	Major
Essex	Southend-on-Sea	182,305	Large
Gloucestershire	Gloucester	118,555	Large
Greater London	Croydon	390,719 (borough)	Major
Greater Manchester	Manchester	470,405	Major
Hampshire	Southampton	249,620	Major
Herefordshire	Hereford	60,480	Medium
Hertfordshire	Watford	131,325	Large
Isle of Wight	Newport	25,405	Medium
Kent	Maidstone	109,490	Large
Lancashire	Blackpool	149,070	Large
Leicestershire	Leicester	406,580	Major
Lincolnshire	Lincoln	104,555	Large
Merseyside	Liverpool	506,565	Major
Norfolk	Norwich	200,770	Major
North Yorkshire	Middlesbrough	148,215	Large
Northamptonshire	Northampton	243,520	Major
Northumberland	Blyth	39,730	Medium
Nottinghamshire	Nottingham	299,790	Major
Oxfordshire	Oxford	159,994	Large
Rutland	Oakham	12,160	Small
Shropshire	Telford	156,910	Large
Somerset	Bath	94,080	Large
South Yorkshire	Sheffield	500,535	Major
Staffordshire	Stoke-on-Trent	260,560	Major
Suffolk	Ipswich	151,565	Large
Surrey	Guildford	77,880	Large
Tyne and Wear	Newcastle-upon-Tyne	286,445	Major
Warwickshire	Nuneaton	88,815	Large
West Midlands	Birmingham	1,121,375	Major
West Sussex	Crawley	120,550	Large
West Yorkshire	Leeds	536,280	Major
Wiltshire	Swindon	183,680	Large
Worcestershire	Worcester	105,465	Large

== See also ==
- List of towns and cities in England by population
- List of ceremonial counties of England
- Counties of England (Comparative areas and populations)
- List of United Kingdom county nicknames
