= Stan Pepperell =

England international rugby league footballer

Personal information
- Full name: Stanley Vincent Pepperell
- Born: fourth ¼ 1914 Seaton district, England
- Died: 1985 (aged 70–71) unknown

Playing information
- Position: Wing, Centre, Stand-off
Club
Years	Team	Pld	T	G	FG	P
1934–49	Huddersfield	280	92	116		508
Representative
Years	Team	Pld	T	G	FG	P
1936–48	Cumberland	11
1936–44	England	3	0	2	0	4
- Relatives: Albert Pepperell (brother); Russell Pepperell (brother)

Stanley Vincent Pepperell (birth registered fourth ¼ 1914 – 1985), also known by the nickname of "Pep" , was an English professional rugby league footballer who played in the 1930s and 1940s. He played at representative level for England and Cumberland, and at club level for Seaton ARLFC (in Seaton near Workington, now represented by Seaton Rangers of the Cumberland League) and Huddersfield, as a wing, centre, or stand-off.

== Background ==
Stan Pepperell's birth was registered in Seaton district, Cumberland, England, and he later lived with Douglas Clark and his family during his time playing for Huddersfield, and afterwards when he worked for the Clark's coal merchant business.

== Playing career ==
=== Club career ===
Pepperell changed from amateur to professional rugby league when he transferred from Seaton ARLFC to Huddersfield during 1934. He spent his entire professional career with the club, appearing 280 times and scoring 508 points.

=== International honours ===
Pepperell won caps for England while at Huddersfield in 1936 against Wales, in 1937 against France, and in 1944 against Wales.

=== County honours ===
Pepperell represented Cumberland. Stan Pepperell played at centre in Cumberland's 5-4 victory over Australia in the 1948–49 Kangaroo tour of Great Britain and France match at the Recreation Ground, Whitehaven on Wednesday 13 October 1948, in front of a crowd of 8,818.

=== County Cup Final appearances ===
Pepperell played stand-off in Huddersfield's 18–10 victory over Hull F.C. in the 1938 Yorkshire Cup Final during the 1938–39 season at Odsal Stadium, Bradford on Saturday 22 October 1938.

=== Testimonial match ===
Pepperell's Testimonial match at Huddersfield took place in 1947.

== Genealogical Information ==
Stanley Pepperell was the older brother of the rugby league footballers; Russell Pepperell and Albert Pepperell.
