= Russ Pepperell =

English rugby league coach and former England international rugby league footballer

Personal information
- Full name: George Russell Pepperell
- Born: 23 April 1918 Seaton, England
- Died: 15 January 2003 (aged 84) Sydney, Australia

Playing information

Rugby league
- Position: Fullback, Wing, Centre, Stand-off
Club
Years	Team	Pld	T	G	FG	P
1938–56	Huddersfield	350	300
Representative
Years	Team	Pld	T	G	FG	P
1947–54	Cumberland	16
1947–49	England	4	1	0	0	3

Rugby union
Representative
Years	Team	Pld	T	G	FG	P
1943	Rugby League XV	1	0	0	0	0

Coaching information
Club
Years	Team	Gms	W	D	L	W%
	Huddersfield
	Keighley
1965	Manly-Warringah	18	6	0	12	33
	Total	18	6	0	12	33
- Relatives: Albert Pepperell (brother); Stan Pepperell (brother)

George Russell Pepperell (23 April 1918 – 15 January 2003) was an English professional rugby league footballer who played in the 1930s, 1940s and 1950s, and coached in the 1950s and 1960s, and rugby union footballer who played in the 1940s. He played representative level rugby league (RL) for England and Cumberland, and at club level for Seaton ARLFC (in Seaton near Workington, now represented by Seaton Rangers of the Cumberland League) and Huddersfield (captain) as a fullback, wing, centre, or stand-off he coached club level rugby league (RL) for Huddersfield and Keighley, before moving to Sydney to coach the Manly-Warringah Sea Eagles, he played representative level rugby union (RU) for Rugby League XV (during World War II), as a full-back.

== Background ==
Russ Pepperell was born in Seaton, Cumberland, his birth was registered in Cockermouth district, England, he was the younger brother of the rugby league footballer; Stanley Pepperell, and the older brother of the rugby league footballer; Albert Pepperell, he was a Lance Corporal in the British Army during World War II, and he died aged 84 in Bundaberg, Australia.

== Playing career ==
Russell Pepperell was a reserve for Northern Command XIII against a Rugby League XIII at Thrum Hall, Halifax on Saturday 21 March 1942.

Pepperell played full-back in Rugby League XV's 18–11 victory over Northern Command XV in the rugby union match on Saturday 23 January 1943.

Pepperell won caps for England while at Huddersfield in 1947 against France, and Wales, in 1948 against Wales, and in 1949 against France, and also represented Cumberland.

Pepperell played fullback in Cumberland's 5–4 victory over Australia in the 1948–49 Kangaroo tour of Great Britain and France match at the Recreation Ground, Whitehaven on Wednesday 13 October 1948, in front of a crowd of 8,818.

Pepperell played at stand-off in Huddersfield's 2–20 defeat by Wigan in the Championship Final during the 1949–50 season at Maine Road, Manchester on Saturday 13 May 1950.

Pepperell's Testimonial match at Huddersfield took place in 1950.

Pepperell played at centre and was captain in Huddersfield's 15–10 victory over St. Helens in the 1953 Challenge Cup Final during the 1952–53 season at Wembley Stadium, London on Saturday 25 April 1953, in front of a crowd of 89,588.

Pepperell played stand-off in Huddersfield's 4–11 defeat by Bradford Northern in the 1949 Yorkshire Cup Final during the 1949–50 season at Headingley, Leeds on Saturday 29 October 1949, played, and scored two tries in the 16–3 victory over Castleford in the 1950 Yorkshire Cup Final during the 1950–51 season at Headingley, Leeds on Saturday 4 November 1950, and played stand-off in the 18–8 victory over Batley in the 1952 Yorkshire Cup Final during the 1952–53 season at Headingley, Leeds on Saturday 15 November 1952.

After he finished playing, Pepperell became Huddersfield's coach. He later moved to Australia as coach of Sydney's Manly-Warringah club in reserve grade in 1964 and first grade for the 1965 NSWRFL season. He remained in the position for one season. Pepperell stayed in Australia and died in Sydney in 2003.
