= Albert Pepperell =

Great Britain international rugby league footballer

Personal information
- Full name: Albert James Pepperell
- Born: c. 1922; Seaton, Cumberland England
- Died: 1986 (aged 63–64)

Playing information
- Position: Scrum-half
Club
Years	Team	Pld	T	G	FG	P
	Seaton
≤1945–45	Huddersfield
1945–≥51	Workington Town
	Total	0	0	0	0	0
Representative
Years	Team	Pld	T	G	FG	P
1946–54	Cumberland	12	1	0	0	3
1952	British Empire XIII	1	0	0	0	0
1950–51	Great Britain	2	0	0	0	0
- Relatives: Russell Pepperell (brother); Stan Pepperell (brother)

Albert James Pepperell (c. 1922 – 1986) was an English professional rugby league footballer who played in the 1940s and 1950s. He played at representative level for Great Britain, Cumberland and British Empire XIII, and at club level for Huddersfield and Workington Town, as a scrum-half.

== Background ==
Pepperell was born in Seaton, Cumberland, England, he was a fitter at the Distington Engineering Company (Chapel Bank), Workington, and he died aged 63–64.

== Playing career ==
=== Club career ===
Albert Pepperell played scrum-half in Workington Town's 18-10 victory over Featherstone Rovers in the 1952 Challenge Cup Final during the 1951–52 season at Wembley Stadium, London on Saturday 19 April 1952, in front of a crowd of 72,093.

Albert Pepperell's Testimonial match at Workington Town took place in 1955.

=== Representative honours ===
Albert Pepperell won a cap for British Empire XIII while at Workington in 1952 against New Zealand, and won caps for Great Britain while at Workington in 1950 against New Zealand, and in 1951 against New Zealand.

Albert Pepperell represented Cumberland. Albert Pepperell played scrum-half in Cumberland's 5-4 victory over Australia in the 1948–49 Kangaroo tour of Great Britain and France match at the Recreation Ground, Whitehaven on Wednesday 13 October 1948, in front of a crowd of 8,818.

== Personal life ==
Albert Pepperell was the younger brother of the rugby league footballers, Stanley Pepperell and Russell Pepperell.
