= List of settlements in West Midlands (county) by population =

The 10 largest settlements of the county of the West Midlands, with district centres in yellow, cities in bold, and key towns shown in white.

This is a list of settlements in West Midlands by population based on the results of the 2021 census. The next United Kingdom census will take place in 2031. In 2011, there were 29 built-up area subdivisions with 5,000 or more inhabitants in the West Midlands, shown in the table below.

== Administrative boundaries ==

	Metropolitan borough	Administrative centre	Towns and areas
1	City of Wolverhampton	Wolverhampton	Aldersley, Bilston, Blakenhall, Bushbury, Oxley, Tettenhall, Wednesfield
2	Dudley	Dudley	Brierley Hill, Cradley, Halesowen, Kingswinford, Lye, Netherton, Stourbridge, Quarry Bank
3	Walsall	Walsall	Aldridge, Bloxwich, Brownhills, Darlaston, Pelsall, Pheasey, Shelfield, Willenhall
4	Sandwell	Oldbury	Bearwood, Rowley Regis, Cradley Heath, Old Hill, Smethwick, Tipton, Tividale, Wednesbury, West Bromwich, Yew Tree
5	City of Birmingham	Birmingham	Aston; Edgbaston, Great Barr, Hall Green, Handsworth, Northfield, Quinton, Soho, Sutton Coldfield, Tyburn
6	Solihull	Solihull	Balsall Common, Bickenhill, Castle Bromwich, Chelmsley Wood, Dorridge, Elmdon, Hampton-in-Arden, Hockley Heath, Kingshurst, Knowle, Marston Green, Meriden, Monkspath
7	City of Coventry	Coventry	Allesley, Binley, Keresley, Stoke, Tile Hill, Willenhall

== Population ranking ==
Table has been taken from the West Midlands Conurbation article and missing county areas added

Rank	Settlement	Population (2021)	Population (2011)	**Notes on significant changes between 2001 and 2011**
1	Birmingham	1,121,375	1,085,810	Gained Quinton from Oldbury-Smethwick USD. Gained Minworth from Sutton Coldfield USD.
2	Coventry	344,285	325,949	Excludes Binley Wood and Bedworth
3	Wolverhampton	234,025	210,319	Bilston and Wednesfield removed from 2001. The three BUASDs combined total 265,178. Essington removed and placed within Willenhall BUASD.
4	Solihull	107,735	123,187	Gained Shelly Green and Knowle-Bentley Heath from 2001.
5	West Bromwich	103,110	72,945	Wednesbury and Tipton removed from 2001. Town split in two by Sandwell Valley and the two parts are now considered separately. The four BUASDs combined total 153,366. Gained Yew Tree from 2001.
6	Sutton Coldfield	93,375	109,015	
7	Walsall	70,775	67,594	Willenhall, Darlaston and Bloxwich removed from 2001. The four BUASDs combined total 185,114.
8	Dudley	64,270	79,379	Coseley, Kingswinford, Brierley Hill and Sedgley removed from 2011. The five BUASDs combined total 215,693. Gained Cradley Heath and Quarry Bank from Oldbury-Smethwick USD.
9	Halesowen	60,110	58,135	
10	Stourbridge	56,950	63,298	Gained Hagley from 2001.
11	Smethwick	56,340	48,765	New in 2011. Previously part of Oldbury-Smethwick USD.
12	Kingswinford	51,910	50,801	New in 2011. Previously part of Dudley USD.
13	Bloxwich	51,875	47,288	New in 2011. Previously part of Walsall USD.
14	Willenhall	49,580	51,429	New in 2011. Previously part of Walsall USD, but also gained Essington from Wolverhampton USD.
15	Tipton	47,200	42,407	New in 2011. Previously part of West Bromwich USD.
16	Oldbury	45,180	23,964	New in 2011. Previously part of Oldbury-Smethwick USD.
17	Rowley Regis	39,050	34,260	New in 2011. Previously part of Oldbury-Smethwick USD.
18	Bilston	34,640	29,556	New in 2011. Previously part of Wolverhampton USD.
19	Brierley Hill	32,305	31,430	New in 2011. Previously part of Dudley USD.
20	Sedgley	31,990	30,979	New in 2011. Previously part of Dudley USD.
21	Wednesfield	-	25,303	New in 2011. Previously part of Wolverhampton USD
22	Coseley	25,205	23,104	New in 2011. Previously part of Dudley USD.
23	Darlaston	21,540	18,803	New in 2011. Previously part of Walsall USD.
24	Brownhills	21,240	20,373	
25	Wednesbury	20,315	19,029	New in 2011. Previously part of West Bromwich USD.
26	West Bromwich East	-	18,985	New in 2011. Previously part of West Bromwich USD.
27	Aldridge	15,835	39,463	Gained Rushall, Shelfield and Pelsall from 2001.
28	Balsall Common	7,095	7,039	
29	Blackheath	6,950	6,518	New in 2011. Previously part of Oldbury-Smethwick USD.

== See also ==
- West Midlands (county)
- West Midlands conurbation
