= List of settlements in Cumbria by population =

Cumbria's 15 largest settlements. The main administrative centre is in bold and district centres in yellow.

This is a list of settlements in Cumbria by population based on the results of the 2021 census. The next United Kingdom census will take place in 2031. In 2021, there were 15 built-up area subdivisions with 5,000 or more inhabitants in Cumbria, shown in the table below.

== Population ranking ==
#	Settlement	Unitary Authority	Population			
#	Settlement	Unitary Authority	2001	2011	2021	Change (2011–2021) (%)
1	Carlisle	Cumberland	70,656	75,985	77,730	+2.3%
2	Barrow-in-Furness	Westmorland and Furness	58,943	56,516	55,255	−2.2%
3	Kendal	Westmorland and Furness	26,548	27,689	28,940	+4.5%
4	Whitehaven	Cumberland	23,924	23,926	22,945	−4.1%
5	Workington	Cumberland	20,870	21,646	21,275	−1.7%
6	Penrith	Westmorland and Furness	14,471	15,181	16,700	+10.0%
7	Ulverston	Westmorland and Furness	10,927	11,037	11,720	+6.2%
8	Cockermouth	Cumberland	8,121	8,562	8,860	+3.5%
9	Maryport	Cumberland	9,043	8,948	8,525	−4.7%
10	Dalton-in-Furness	Westmorland and Furness	8,057	7,827	7,555	−3.5%
11	Cleator Moor	Cumberland	6,939	6,936	6,670	−3.8%
12	Egremont	Cumberland	5,996	6,222	5,795	−6.9%
13	Millom	Cumberland	6,103	5,980	5,690	−4.8%
14	Wigton	Cumberland	5,011	5,391	5,395	+0.1%
15	Seaton	Cumberland	4,861	5,022	5,050	+0.6%

== See also ==
- Cumbria
- List of towns and cities in England by population
