= Barepot =

Village in Cumbria, England

Coordinates: 54.64°N 03.53°W

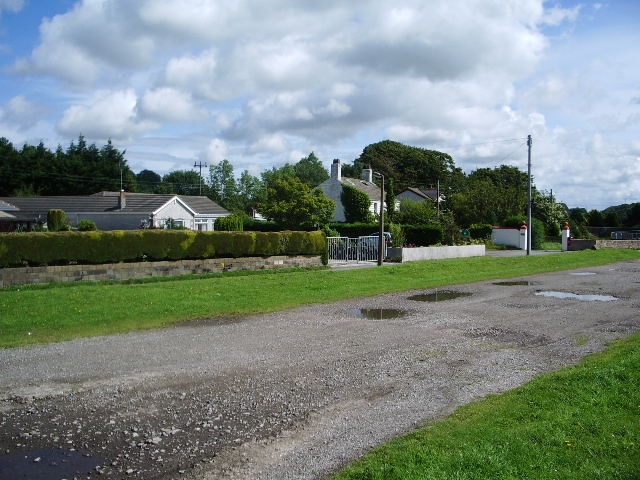
- Dwellings in Barepot

- Location in Allerdale, Cumbria Location within Cumbria
- OS grid reference: NY0129
- Civil parish: Workington
- Unitary authority: Cumberland
- Ceremonial county: Cumbria
- Region: North West
- Country: England
- Sovereign state: United Kingdom
- Post town: WORKINGTON
- Postcode district: CA14
- Dialling code: 01900
- Police: Cumbria
- Fire: Cumbria
- Ambulance: North West
- UK Parliament: Whitehaven and Workington

Barepot is a village in Cumbria, England. As Workington and Seaton grew, Barepot and also Seaton became districts of Workington. Barepot has about 70 houses and is situated on the River Derwent. There are no transport links (e.g. Workington Circulars), but Barepot is only a 5- to 10-minute walk into the centre of Workington.

Barepot was in the news in 2002, when the remains of a baby, named "Lara" by police, were found encased in a block of cement/concrete. The discovery was made when a man was clearing out a pit in a garage and discovered the block.

To this day no one has been charged with the murder of Baby Lara, although a couple were arrested but released without charge.

Lara is buried in St Peters churchyard at Camerton.
