= Seaton Iron Works =

Seaton Iron Works was an iron works which operated between 1763 and 1899 under different titles and various owners. The site chosen was on the north bank of the River Derwent and was in the parish of Seaton, Cumberland. Beyond ironmaking, it also manufactured iron goods, tin plate and, under the control of Adam Heslop, a foundry owner of Lowca, served as a manufacturer of stationary steam engines.

== History ==
The Seaton Iron Works were set up in 1762 by the firm of Hicks Spedding & Co., on land leased from Sir James Lowther for ninety-nine years. Plans for and construction on the expansive premises occurred under the direction of Richard Spedding, a noted local engineer and built in 1863. His father was Carlisle Spedding who sank the Saltom Coal Mine and was sited south of Whitehaven Harbour. The works were known as the "Barepot Works", a corruption of the name of the ground where the establishment lay, "Beer-pot". From a two blast furnaces, bar and wrought iron was produced, and in an adjoining foundry were manufactured ships' cannon, steam engines and other ironware.

The iron works was purchased in 1837 by Tulk Ley & Co. in the same package as when they purchased the Lowca Engineering Works at Lowca. Under the control of Tulk, Ley and Co., the blast furnaces were consequently rebuilt, and the works reorganized. However, iron production only lasted until 1857 and the premises were eventually advertised for sale as a tinplate works in 1869.

The works was bought by William Ivander Griffiths a Welshman from Treforest in Wales who had served a career in tin plate making in Wales. He brought his own workers with him and formed a music society that performed music festivals in Workington. The demand for tinplate fluctuated and Griffiths eventually sold out to a nearby Steelworks in 1885. Griffiths was kept on as Works manager by the West Cumberland Hematite Iron & Steel Company, but the purchase turned out to be a poor investment.

A siding from the Cockermouth and Workington Section of the London & North Western Railway soon after the purchase to take finished products away by rail. The purchasing company had its own business problems and by 1890 was suffering from financial difficulties. The works remained open for another nine years, but after a struggle to service its debts, it was closed down in 1899. The buildings and siding remained intact for several years, but when no new buyer came forward the works were dismantled over a period of time. The last buildings were torn down by 1904, leaving little in the way of evidence of the site's existence except for a reservoir and the source canal. Prior to that point, the ironworks had employed hundreds of people.

Model boating enthusiasts used the reservoir to sail boats on between the two world wars and again in the 1950s.

== Remaining products ==
Two Heslop engines that were built c. 1824 under license from James Watt are today in the collection of the Science Museum in London.

== Reference list ==
- Jollie's Cumberland Guide & Directory. Carlisle: F. Jollie and Sons. 1811.
- Ferguson, Richard S., ed. (1881). Transactions of the Cumberland & Westmorland Antiquarian & Archeological Society. Vol. V. Kendal: T. Wilson.
- The iron And Steel Industry Of West Cumberland by JY Lancaster & DR Wattleworth. Workington, Cumbria: CN Print Ltd. 1977.
