= List of counties of the United Kingdom =

List of geographic divisions

This is a list of the counties of the United Kingdom. The history of local government in the United Kingdom differs between England, Northern Ireland, Scotland and Wales, and the subnational divisions within these which have been called counties have varied over time and by purpose. The county has formed the upper tier of local government over much of the United Kingdom at one time or another, and has been used for a variety of other purposes, such as for Lord Lieutenants, land registration and postal delivery. This list of 184 counties is split by constituent country, time period and purpose.

Colour key in tables below
Green: Current official status
Yellow: Historical or superseded status

== England ==
Changes between the 1990s and 2009 subdivided the short-lived non-metropolitan counties of Cleveland and Humberside into unitary authorities, but the former county names continue for fire services and police forces (see Non-metropolitan county § List of non-metropolitan counties). Similarly the short-lived county of Avon provides part of the area and name of Avon and Somerset Police and its area is roughly that of the Avon Fire and Rescue Service.

The historic counties of Yorkshire, Cumberland, Westmorland, Huntingdonshire and Middlesex are the five defunct ceremonial counties which were historically counties. With their abolition as ceremonial counties, Yorkshire is divided for that purpose into the East Riding of Yorkshire, North Yorkshire, South Yorkshire and West Yorkshire. Cumberland and Westmorland were combined with a former exclave of Lancashire to form Cumbria, Huntingdonshire merged into Cambridgeshire, and the vastly greater part of Middlesex became part of Greater London.

Contemporary reference to the Isle of Ely and nearby Soke of Peterborough has been very rare since the early 20th century and they have scant public resonance. The counties in italics below are neither ceremonial nor historic.

The list does not include the 61 county boroughs (1889–1974) or the 18 counties corporate (before 1889), each of which was an administrative county for a single town or city, within a larger "county-at-large".

County	Current ceremonial	From 1974		Postal 1974–1996	1889–1974		Before 1889
County	Current ceremonial	Metropolitan	Non-metropolitan	Postal 1974–1996	County	Administrative	Before 1889
Avon			Yes 1974–1996	Yes			
Bath and North East Somerset			UA 1996+				
Bedfordshire	Yes		Yes 1974–2009	Yes	Yes	Yes	Yes
Bedford			UA 2009+				
Berkshire	Yes		Yes (governed by six UAs)	Yes	Yes	Yes	Yes
Blackburn with Darwen			UA 1998+				
Blackpool			UA 1998+				
Bournemouth, Christchurch and Poole			UA 2019+				
Bournemouth			UA 1997–2019				
Brighton and Hove			UA 1997+				
Bristol	Yes		UA 1996+	Special post town	Yes	County borough	County corporate
Buckinghamshire	Yes		Yes (and UA 2020+)	Yes	Yes	Yes	Yes
Cambridgeshire	Yes		Yes	Yes	Yes 1889–1965	Yes 1889–1965	Yes
Cambridgeshire and Isle of Ely					Yes 1965–1974	Yes 1965–1974	
Central Bedfordshire			UA 2009+				
Cheshire	Yes		Yes 1974–2009	Yes	Yes	Yes	Yes
Cheshire East			UA 2009+				
Cheshire West and Chester			UA 2009+				
Cleveland			Yes 1974–1996	Yes			
Cornwall	Yes		Yes (and UA 2009+)	Yes	Yes	Yes	Yes
Cumberland			UA 2023+		Yes	Yes	Yes
Cumbria	Yes		Yes 1974–2023	Yes			
Darlington			UA 1997+				
Derbyshire	Yes		Yes	Yes	Yes	Yes	Yes
Derby			UA 1997+				
Devon	Yes		Yes	Yes	Yes	Yes	Yes
Dorset	Yes		Yes (and UA 2019+)	Yes	Yes	Yes	Yes
Durham (County Durham)	Yes		Yes (and UA 2009+)	Yes	Yes	Yes	Yes
East Suffolk						Yes	Division
East Sussex	Yes		Yes	Yes		Yes	Division
Essex	Yes		Yes	Yes	Yes	Yes	Yes
Gloucestershire	Yes		Yes	Yes	Yes	Yes	Yes
Greater London	Yes	County		Yes		Yes 1965–1974	
Greater Manchester	Yes	Yes					
Hampshire	Yes		Yes	Yes	Yes	Yes	Yes
Halton			UA 1998+				
Hartlepool			UA 1996+				
Hereford and Worcester			Yes 1974–1998				
Herefordshire	Yes		UA 1998+	Yes	Yes	Yes	Yes
Hertfordshire	Yes		Yes	Yes	Yes	Yes	Yes
Humberside			Yes 1974–1996				
Huntingdon and Peterborough					Yes 1965–1974	Yes 1965–1974	
Huntingdonshire					Yes 1889–1965	Yes 1889–1965	Yes
Isle of Ely						Yes 1889–1965	Division
Isle of Wight	Yes		Yes (and UA 1995+)	Yes		Yes 1890–1974	
Kent	Yes		Yes	Yes	Yes	Yes	Yes
Kingston upon Hull			UA 1996+				
Lancashire	Yes		Yes	Yes	Yes	Yes	Yes
Leicestershire	Yes		Yes	Yes	Yes	Yes	Yes
Leicester			UA 1997+				
Lincolnshire	Yes		Yes	Yes	Yes		Yes
Lincolnshire, Parts of Holland						Yes	Division
Lincolnshire, Parts of Kesteven						Yes	Division
Lincolnshire, Parts of Lindsey						Yes	Division
London				Special post town	Yes 1889–1965	Yes 1889–1965	The Metropolis
City of London	Yes						County corporate
Luton			UA 1997+				
Medway			UA 1998+				
Merseyside	Yes	Yes		Yes			
Middlesbrough			UA 1996+				
Middlesex				Yes	Yes	Yes	Yes
Milton Keynes			UA 1997+				
Norfolk	Yes		Yes	Yes	Yes	Yes	Yes
Northamptonshire	Yes		Yes 1974–2021	Yes	Yes	Yes	Yes
North East Lincolnshire			UA 1996+				
North Humberside				Yes			
North Lincolnshire			UA 1996+				
North Northamptonshire			UA 2021+				
North Somerset			UA 1996+				
Northumberland	Yes		Yes (and UA 2009+)	Yes	Yes	Yes	Yes
North Yorkshire	Yes		Yes (and UA 2023+)	Yes			
Nottinghamshire	Yes		Yes	Yes	Yes	Yes	Yes
Nottingham			UA 1998+				
Oxfordshire	Yes		Yes	Yes	Yes	Yes	Yes
Soke of Peterborough						Yes 1889–1965	Liberty
Peterborough			UA 1998+				
Plymouth			UA 1998+				
Poole			UA 1997–2019				
Portsmouth			UA 1997+				
Redcar and Cleveland			UA 1996+				
Rutland	Yes		UA 1997+	Yes 2008+	Yes	Yes	Yes
Shropshire	Yes		Yes (and UA 2009+)	Yes	Yes	Yes	Yes
Somerset	Yes		Yes (and UA 2023+)	Yes	Yes	Yes	Yes
Southampton			UA 1997+				
Southend-on-Sea			UA 1998+				
South Humberside				Yes			
South Gloucestershire			UA 1996+				
South Yorkshire	Yes	Yes		Yes			
Staffordshire	Yes		Yes	Yes	Yes	Yes	Yes
Stockton-on-Tees			UA 1996+				
Stoke-on-Trent			UA 1998+				
Suffolk	Yes		Yes	Yes	Yes		Yes
Surrey	Yes		Yes	Yes	Yes	Yes	Yes
Sussex					Yes		Yes
Swindon			UA 1998+				
Telford and Wrekin			UA 1998+				
Thurrock			UA 1998+				
Torbay			UA 1998+				
Tyne and Wear	Yes	Yes		Yes			
Warrington			UA 1998+				
Warwickshire	Yes		Yes	Yes	Yes	Yes	Yes
West Midlands	Yes	Yes		Yes			
Westmorland					Yes	Yes	Yes
Westmorland and Furness			UA 2023+				
West Northamptonshire			UA 2021+				
West Suffolk						Yes	Division
West Sussex	Yes		Yes	Yes		Yes	Division
West Yorkshire	Yes	Yes		Yes			
Wiltshire	Yes		Yes (and UA 2009+)	Yes	Yes	Yes	Yes
Worcestershire	Yes		Yes 1998+	Yes	Yes	Yes	Yes
Yorkshire					Yes		Yes
Yorkshire, East Riding	Yes		UA 1996+		L	Yes	Division
Yorkshire, North Riding					L	Yes	Division
Yorkshire, West Riding					L	Yes	Division
York			UA 1996+				

== Northern Ireland ==
County	Current lieutenancy	Postal before 1996	1899–1973		Before 1899
County	Current lieutenancy	Postal before 1996	County	Administrative	Before 1899
Antrim	Yes	Yes	Yes	Yes	Yes
Armagh	Yes	Yes	Yes	Yes	Yes
City of Belfast	Yes	Special post town	Yes CB	Yes	Part of counties Antrim and Down
Down	Yes	Yes	Yes	Yes	Yes
Fermanagh	Yes	Yes	Yes	Yes	Yes
Londonderry	Yes	Yes	Yes	Yes	Yes
City of Derry	Yes	Special post town	Yes CB	Yes	Part of County Londonderry
Tyrone	Yes	Yes	Yes	Yes	Yes

== Scotland ==
County	Lieutenancy	Registration	Postal before 1996	1890–1975	Before 1890
City of Aberdeen	Yes		Special post town	Yes 1900	
Aberdeenshire	Yes	Yes	Yes	Yes	Yes
Angus (Forfarshire)	Yes	Yes	Yes	Yes	Yes
Argyll	Yes	Yes	Yes	Yes	Yes
Ayrshire	Yes	Yes	Yes	Yes	Yes
Banffshire	Yes	Yes	Yes	Yes	Yes
Berwickshire	Yes	Yes	Yes	Yes	Yes
Bute	Yes	Yes	Yes	Yes	Yes
Caithness	Yes	Yes	Yes	Yes	Yes
Clackmannanshire	Yes	Yes	Yes	Yes	Yes
Cromartyshire					Yes
Dumfriesshire	Yes	Yes	Yes	Yes	Yes
Dunbartonshire (Dumbarton)	Yes	Yes	Yes	Yes	Yes
City of Dundee	Yes		Special post town	Yes 1894	
East Lothian (Haddingtonshire)	Yes	Yes	Yes	Yes	Yes
City of Edinburgh	Yes		Special post town	Yes	Yes
Fife	Yes	Yes	Yes	Yes	Yes
City of Glasgow	Yes	Yes	Special post town	Yes 1893	
Inverness-shire	Yes	Yes	Yes	Yes	Yes
Kincardineshire	Yes	Yes	Yes	Yes	Yes
Kinross-shire	Yes	Yes	Yes	Yes	Yes
Kirkcudbrightshire	Yes	Yes	Yes	Yes	Yes
Lanarkshire	Yes	Yes	Yes	Yes	Yes
Midlothian (County of Edinburgh)	Yes	Yes	Yes	Yes	Yes
Moray (Elginshire)	Yes	Yes	Yes	Yes	Yes
Nairnshire	Yes	Yes	Yes	Yes	Yes
Orkney	Yes	Yes	Yes	Yes	Yes
Peeblesshire	Yes	Yes	Yes	Yes	Yes
Perthshire	Yes	Yes	Yes	Yes	Yes
Renfrewshire	Yes	Yes	Yes	Yes	Yes
Ross and Cromarty	Yes	Yes		Yes	
Ross-shire			Yes		Yes
Roxburghshire	Yes	Yes	Yes	Yes	Yes
Selkirkshire	Yes	Yes	Yes	Yes	Yes
Shetland (Zetland)	Yes	Yes	Yes	Yes	Yes
Stirlingshire	Yes	Yes	Yes	Yes	Yes
Sutherland	Yes	Yes	Yes	Yes	Yes
West Lothian (Linlithgowshire)	Yes	Yes	Yes	Yes	Yes
Wigtownshire	Yes	Yes	Yes	Yes	Yes

== Wales ==
County	1996+		Postal 1974–1996	1974–1996	1889–1974	Before 1889
County	Preserved	County	Postal 1974–1996	1974–1996	1889–1974	Before 1889
Anglesey		Yes Isle of Anglesey			Yes	Yes
Brecknockshire					Yes	Yes
Caernarfonshire					Yes	Yes
Cardiganshire		Yes Ceredigion			Yes	Yes
Carmarthenshire		Yes			Yes	Yes
Clwyd	Yes		Yes	Yes		
Denbighshire		Yes			Yes	Yes
Dyfed	Yes		Yes	Yes		
Flintshire		Yes			Yes	Yes
Glamorgan					Yes	Yes
Gwent	Yes		Yes	Yes		
Gwynedd	Yes	Yes	Yes	Yes		
Merionethshire					Yes	Yes
Mid Glamorgan	Yes		Yes	Yes		
Monmouthshire		Yes			Yes	Yes
Montgomeryshire					Yes	Yes
Pembrokeshire		Yes			Yes	Yes
Powys	Yes	Yes	Yes	Yes		
Radnorshire					Yes	Yes
South Glamorgan	Yes		Yes	Yes		
West Glamorgan	Yes		Yes	Yes		
Wrexham		Yes				

== See also ==
- List of United Kingdom county nicknames
- Counties of Ireland
- Alias Data
