= List of settlements in Berkshire by population =

This is a list of settlements in Berkshire by population based on the results of the 2021 census. The next United Kingdom census will take place in 2031. In 2021, there were 21 built-up area subdivisions with 5,000 or more inhabitants in Berkshire, shown in the table below.

Berkshire's 11 largest settlements, council centres are highlighted.

== Population ranking ==
#	Settlement	Borough/District	Population^{1}		
#	Settlement	Borough/District	2001	2011	2021
1	Reading	Reading	206,060	218,705	300,800
2	Slough	Slough	133,860	155,298	200,054
3	Bracknell	Bracknell Forest	74,090	77,256	95,023
4	Maidenhead	Windsor and Maidenhead	57,930	63,580	77,012
5	Wokingham	Wokingham	42,190	42,728	45,923
6	Newbury	West Berkshire	34,670	38,762	42,987
7	Woodley	Wokingham	34,200	35,470	37,983
8	Windsor	Windsor and Maidenhead	28,443	31,225	35,000
9	Thatcham	West Berkshire	23,550	26,017	32,456
10	Sandhurst	Bracknell Forest	20,670	20,495	28,913
11	Crowthorne	Bracknell Forest	14,210	14,263	15,654
12	Ascot/North Ascot	Bracknell Forest	9,480	10,227	13,000
13	Twyford	Wokingham	7,035	7,533	12,101
14	Wraysbury/Old Windsor	Windsor and Maidenhead	7,008	7,377	10,055
15	Sunninghill/South Ascot^{**}^{2}	Windsor and Maidenhead	6,538	7,042	10,000
16	Burghfield Common	West Berkshire	5,617	5,932	7,000
17	Sunningdale^{**}^{3}	Windsor and Maidenhead	4,875	5,347	7,459
18	Cookham	Windsor and Maidenhead	4,917	5,108	7,421
19	Hungerford	West Berkshire	4,938	5,100	7,012
20	Datchet	Windsor and Maidenhead	4,646	4,913	5,987
21	Earley	Wokingham	3,646	3,945	5,646
22	Holyport	Windsor and Maidenhead	2,000	2,022	3,041
23	Sonning	Wokingham	1,933	1,937	2,011
24	Lambourn	West Berkshire	1,300	1,567	2,066
25	Theale	West Berkshire	1,002	1,357	1,553

^{**} Ward count

== Notes ==
- ^1
- ^2
- ^3

== Historical County Population ranking ==
#	Settlement	Borough/District	Population^{1}		Notes
#	Settlement	Borough/District	2001	2011	
1	Reading	Reading	206,060	218,705	
2	Bracknell	Bracknell Forest	74,090	77,256	
3	Maidenhead	Windsor and Maidenhead	57,930	63,580	
4	Wokingham	Wokingham	42,190	42,728	
5	Newbury	West Berkshire	34,670	38,762	
6	Abingdon-on-Thames	Vale of White Horse		37,931	In Berkshire until 1974.
7	Didcot	South Oxfordshire		32,183	200 dwellings in the south-east of the town lie in neighbouring East Hagbourne parish. In Berkshire until 1974.
8	Windsor	Windsor and Maidenhead	28,443	31,225	
9	Thatcham	West Berkshire	23,550	26,017	
10	Sandhurst	Bracknell Forest	20,670	20,495	
11	Crowthorne	Bracknell Forest	14,210	14,263	
12	Wantage	Vale of White Horse		13,106	In Berkshire until 1974.
13	Ascot/North Ascot	Bracknell Forest	9,480	10,227	
14	Faringdon	Vale of White Horse		8,627	Great Faringdon civil parish, in Berkshire until 1974.
15	Wallingford	South Oxfordshire		8,455	In Berkshire until 1974.
16	Twyford	Wokingham	7,035	7,533	
17	Wraysbury/Old Windsor	Windsor and Maidenhead	7,008	7,377	
18	Sunninghill/South Ascot^{**}^{2}	Windsor and Maidenhead	6,538	7,042	
19	Burghfield Common	West Berkshire	5,617	5,932	
20	Sunningdale^{**}^{3}	Windsor and Maidenhead	4,875	5,347	
21	Cookham	Windsor and Maidenhead	4,917	5,108	
22	Hungerford	West Berkshire	4,938	5,100	
23	Datchet	Windsor and Maidenhead	4,646	4,913	
24	Sonning	Windsor and Maidenhead	1,101		

== See also ==
- Berkshire
- List of settlements in Oxfordshire by population
- List of towns and cities in England by population
