= Yew Tree, West Bromwich =

Residential area of West Bromwich town

Coordinates: 52.5589°N 1.9640°W

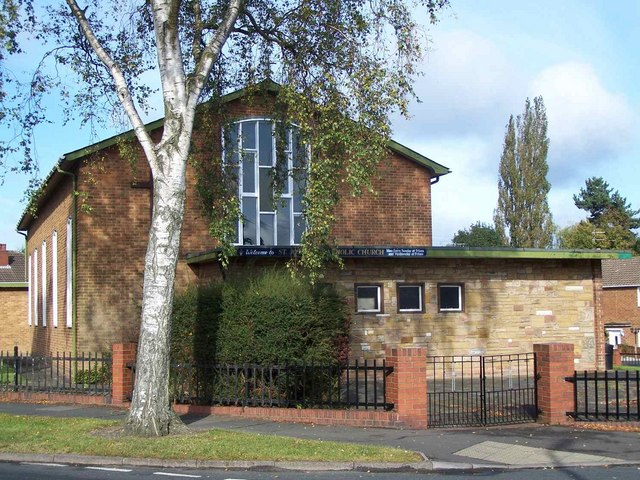
Roman Catholic church of St Joseph in Yew Tree Estate

Yew Tree (often associated with Tamebridge), is a residential area of the town of West Bromwich in the metropolitan borough of Sandwell in the West Midlands County, England. It forms part of Great Barr with Tamebridge & Yew Tree ward. It is often thought to be in Walsall but that is the area's post town only.

The area comprises housing, small shops, a church, a community centre and healthcare centre. The area is in the WS5 4 Postcode district along with the adjacent area Tamebridge.

It is bounded by an area of greenbelt to the south and east and after that is Grove Vale, Great Barr, Birmingham. To the north is Palfrey, Walsall, and to the west, Friar Park, Wednesbury. In the south-west is the rest of main West Bromwich.

== Local Facilities ==
Yew Tree has a community centre, health centre and play area by the local row of shops on Redwood Road. The Archers pub is on Thorncroft Way. The Church of the Annunciation is on Redwood Road. The Parish Priest is also the Vicar of St Gabriel's Fullbrook.

== Schools ==
The estate was previously home to two primary schools, Fir Tree and Yew Tree. In 2006 both schools were merged under the Yew Tree name however they continued to operate at both sites, one on Birchfield Way (the original Yew Tree) and the other on Greenside Way (Fir Tree). The Birchfield Way site has been partially developed with a new building being built not only with extra classrooms for also rooms for the local community. In 2011 the Greenside Way site shut and all children are now taught from the Birchfield Way site. In 2012 the Greenside Way site was demolished and the land was redeveloped for housing. Refurbished in 2019, Joseph Leckie Academy provides secondary school education in the area located on Walstead Road.

=== Rail ===
Tame Bridge Parkway railway station is only a short walk or 5-minute bus or car journey away from Yew Tree & Tamebridge, providing frequent trains to Walsall, Rugeley Trent Valley or Birmingham New Street.

== Famous people ==
- K.K. Downing – Judas Priest guitarist
- Ian Hill – Judas Priest bassist
- Matthew Marsden – Actor

Other Information

It is within the West Bromwich side of the WS5 postcode.

Yew Tree refers to the older estate on the East of Redwood Road.

Tamebridge refers to the estate on the West.
