= List of settlements in Staffordshire by population =

Some of the larger settlements of Staffordshire. District centres in yellow, cities and county town in bold.

This is a list of settlements in Staffordshire with over 5,000 inhabitants based on the data from the article on each settlement which in turn is taken from the 2001 and 2011 UK Censuses. The entire population of Staffordshire is 1,069,000. Staffordshire has two cities, Stoke on Trent and Lichfield. There are a number of towns but the majority of settlements in the county are small rural villages.

Rank	Settlement	District	Population	
Rank	Settlement	District	2001	2011
1	Stoke-on-Trent	Stoke-on-Trent	240,636	249,008
2	Tamworth	Tamworth	75,800	76,813
3	Newcastle-under-Lyme	Newcastle-under-Lyme	73,944	75,082
4	Burton-upon-Trent	East Staffordshire	64,449	72,299
5	Stafford	Stafford	55,700	68,472
6	Lichfield	Lichfield	30,050	32,877
7	Cannock	Cannock Chase	28,435	29,018
8	Burntwood	Lichfield	25,674	28,553
9	Kidsgrove	Newcastle-under-Lyme	24,112	26,293
10	Rugeley	Cannock Chase	22,724	24,033
11	Leek	Staffordshire Moorlands	18,678	19,624
12	Biddulph	Staffordshire Moorlands	17,241	17,669
13	Hednesford	Cannock Chase	16,961	17,343
14	Stone	Stafford	14,258	16,385
15	Wombourne	South Staffordshire	13,691	13,511
16	Uttoxeter	East Staffordshire	13,309	13,089
17	Heath Hayes and Wimblebury	Cannock Chase	12,176	14,085
18	Cheadle	Staffordshire Moorlands	12,158	11,404
19	Great Wyrley	South Staffordshire	11,236	11,060
20	Perton	South Staffordshire	11,118	10,686
21	Penkridge	South Staffordshire	7,000	7,791
22	Codsall	South Staffordshire	7,496	7,582
23	Norton Canes	Cannock Chase	6.394	7,479
24	Eccleshall	Stafford	6,312	6,657
25	Bilbrook	South Staffordshire	4,569	4,913
26	Kinver	South Staffordshire	4,607	4,723
27	Armitage	Lichfield	4,675	4,650
