= List of settlements in Cornwall by population =

The largest settlements of the county of Cornwall, with its city in bold. Isles of Scilly also shown.

This is a list of settlements in Cornwall by population based on the results of the 2021 census. The next United Kingdom census will take place in 2031. In 2021, there were 21 built-up area subdivisions with 5,000 or more inhabitants in Cornwall, shown in the table below.

Parish counts take in wider areas than these urban areas and these are listed in the gallery section below.

== Population ranking of built-up areas ==
#	Settlement	Population		
#	Settlement	2001	2011	2021
1	Newquay	19,562	20,457	24,545
2	St Austell	20,046	22,737	24,070
3	Falmouth	21,158	22,206	24,070
4	Truro	18,081	20,044	23,060
5	Camborne	16,938	17,583	20,450
6	Bodmin	12,882	14,736	16,910
7	Redruth	12,136	13,799	15,455
8	Saltash	14,277	15,566	15,435
9	Penzance	14,928	14,871	14,960
10	Helston	9,542	10,958	11,360
11	Penryn	7,294	9,484	11,195
12	Liskeard	8,656	9,417	10,900
13	Hayle	7,559	8,210	9,040
14	Pool/Illogan	7,634	7,780	8,595
15	Launceston	6,762	7,754	8,425
16	Bude	6,774	7,237	7,350
17	Torpoint	8,109	7,398	7,169
18	St Blazey	6,530	6,746	6,575
19	Wadebridge	5,102	5,541	5,625
20	St Ives	6,300	6,218	5,410
21	Looe	5,280	5,112	5,310

== Gallery of top 21 civil parishes by population ==
The top civil parishes by population at the time of the United Kingdom Census 2011 with over 7,000 people. Some of these parishes form part of larger conurbations, the largest being Camborne/Carn Brea/Illogan/Redruth/Lanner/Carharrack/St Day, with 55,400. The second largest is St Austell/St Austell Bay/Carlyon/St Blaise/Tywardreath and Par, with 34,700 people. The third largest is Falmouth/Penryn/Mabe with 33,000.

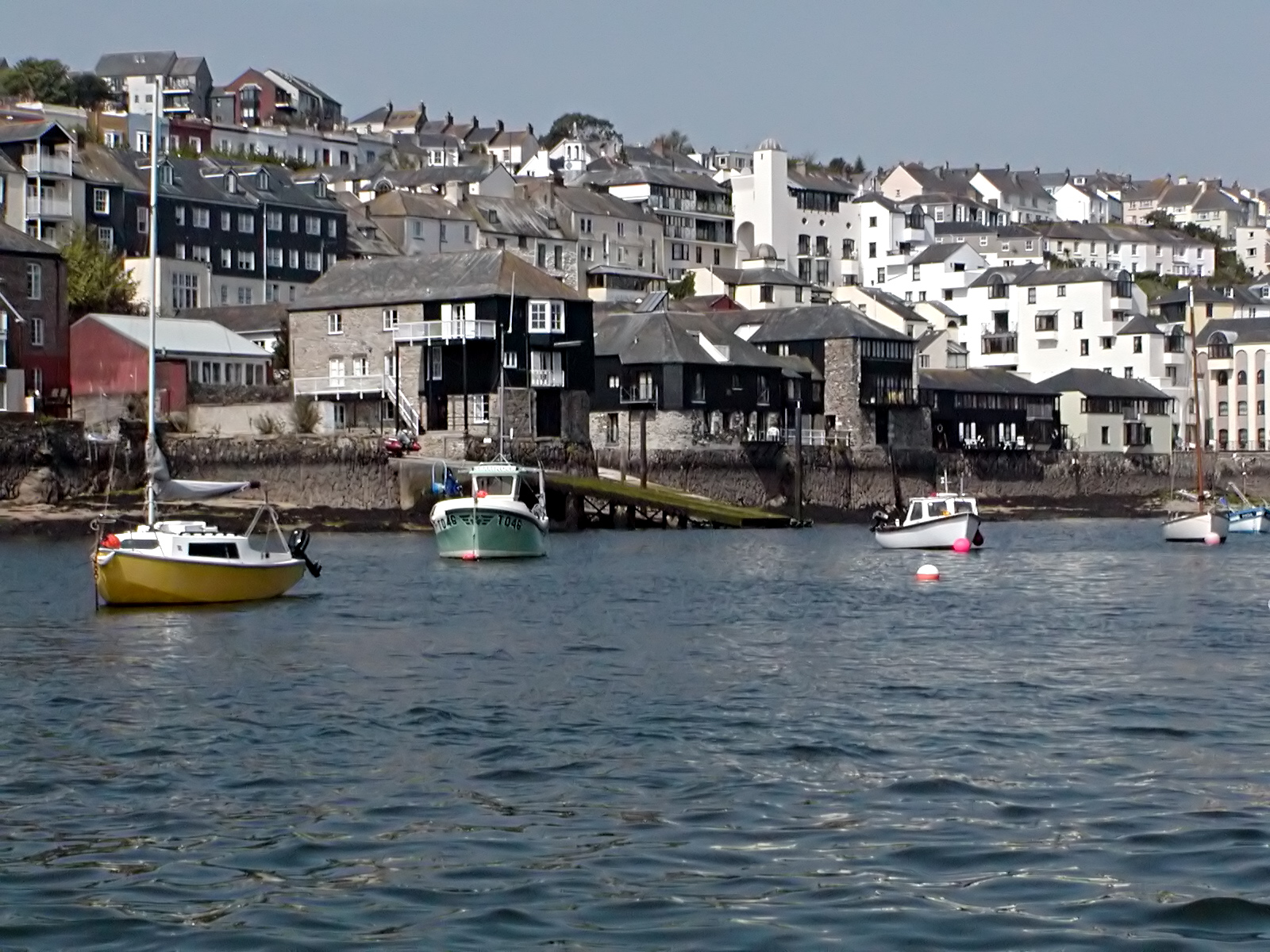
Falmouth (Aberfala) 21,797

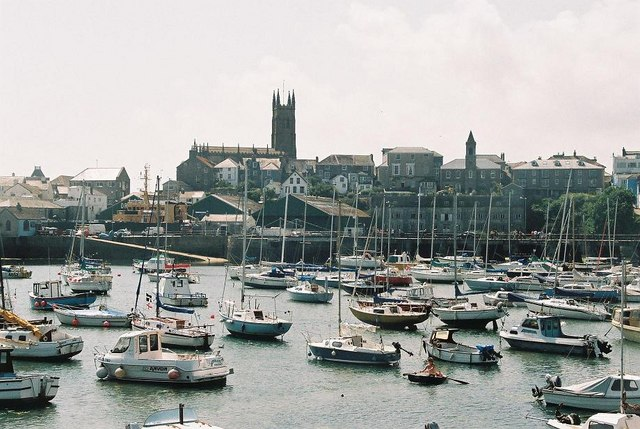
Penzance (Pennsans) 21,045

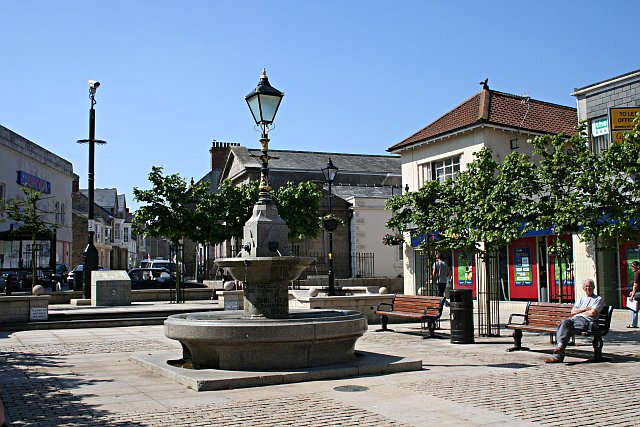
Camborne (Kammbronn) 20,845

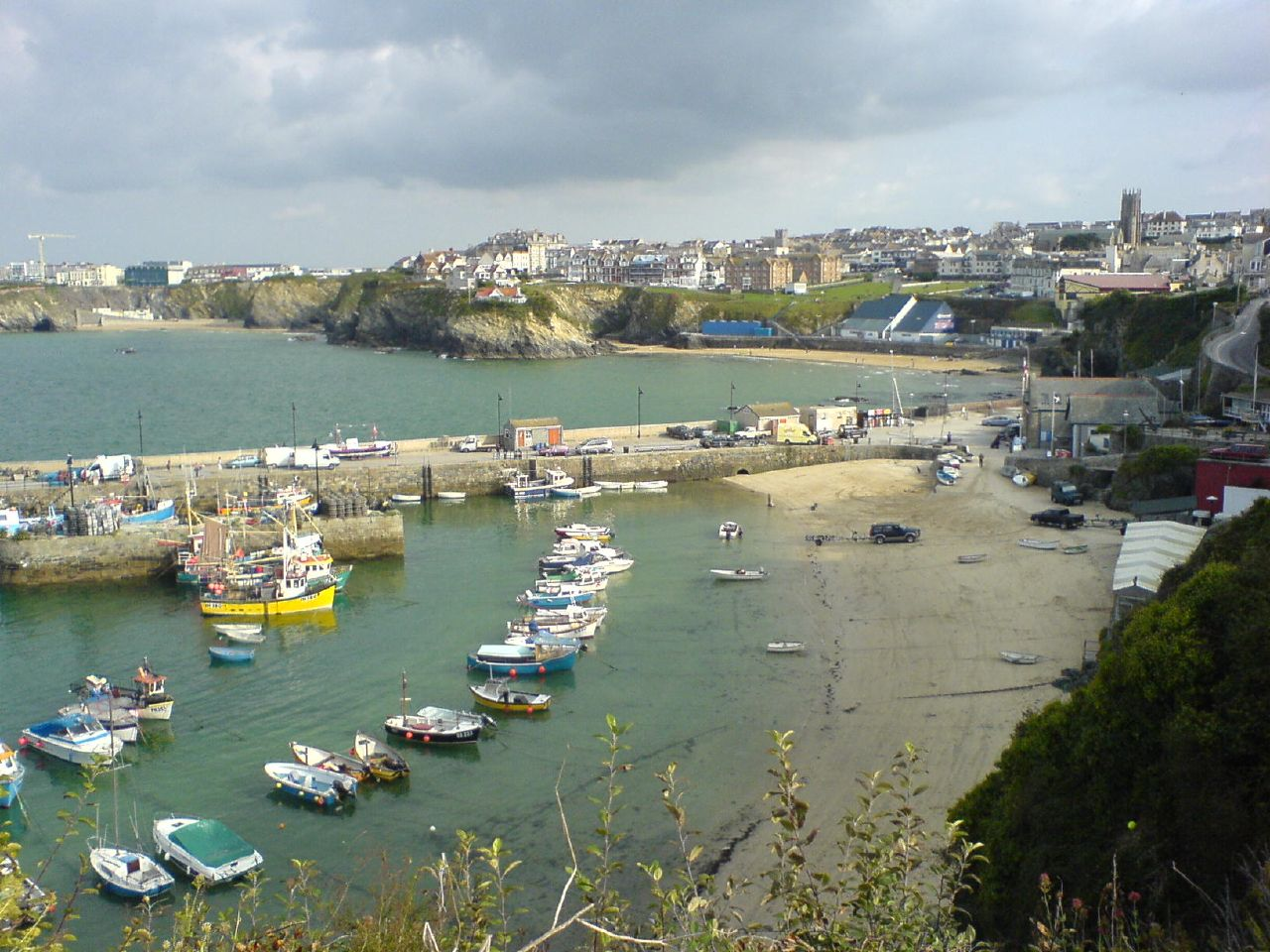
Newquay (Tewynblustri) 20,342

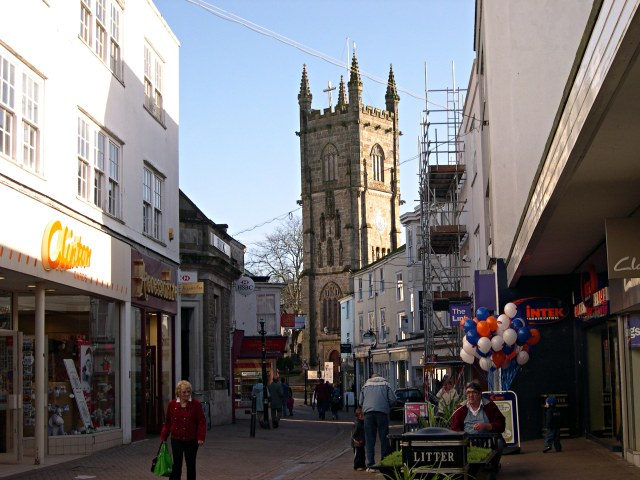
St Austell (Sen Austel) 19,958

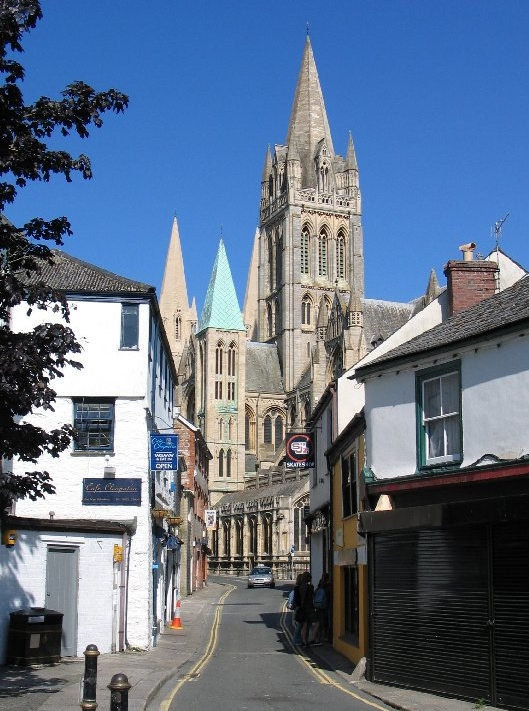
Truro (Truru) 18,766

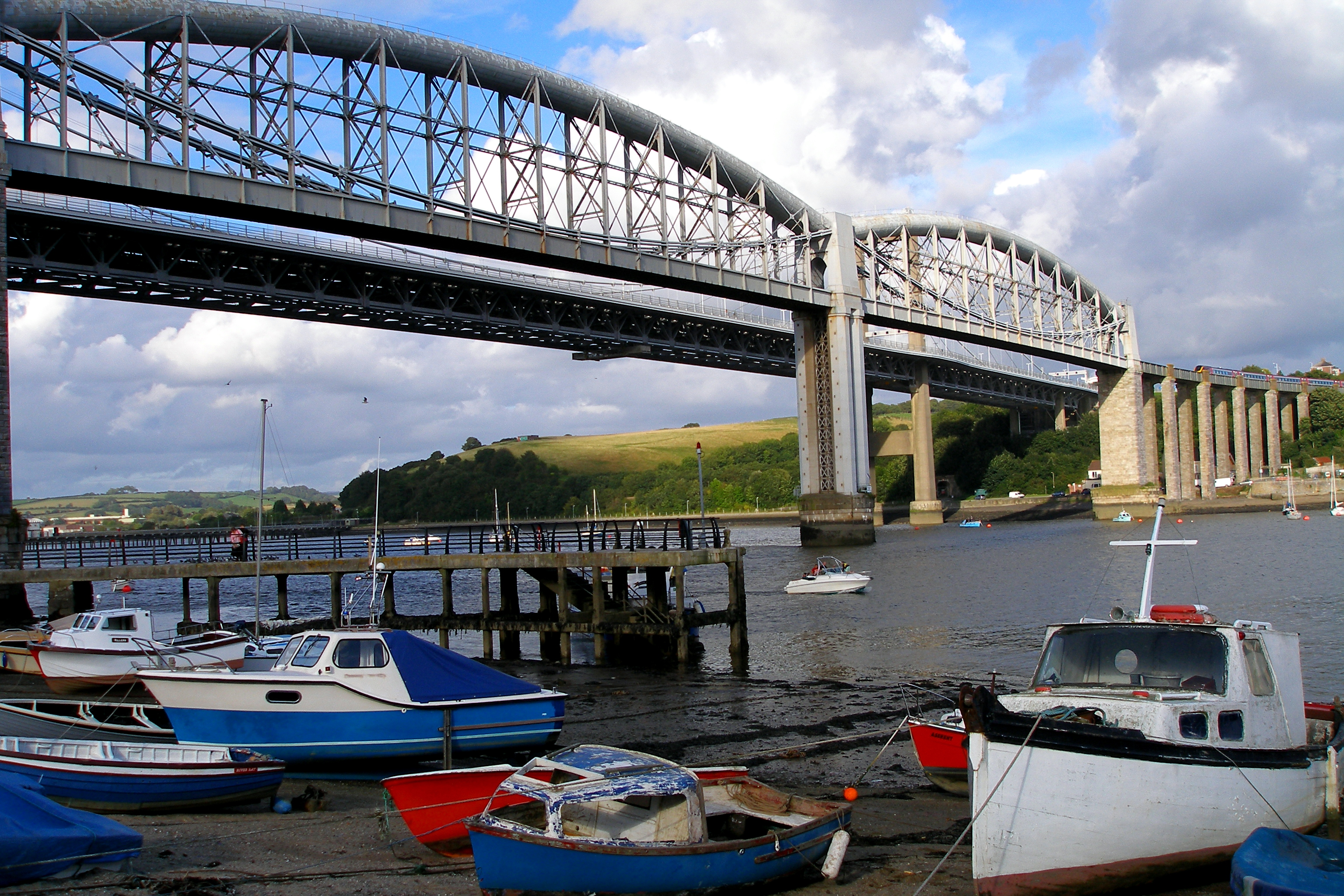
Saltash (Essa) 16,419

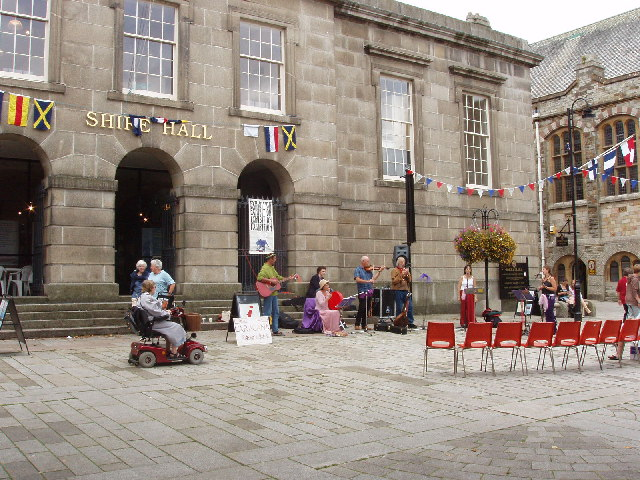
Bodmin (Bosvena) 14,736

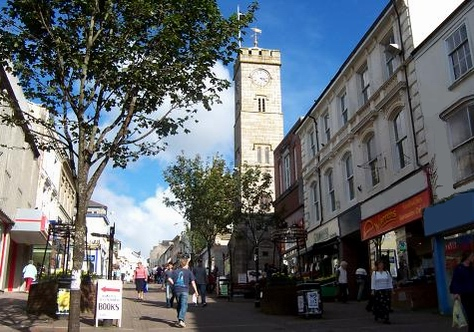
Redruth (Resrudh) 14,018

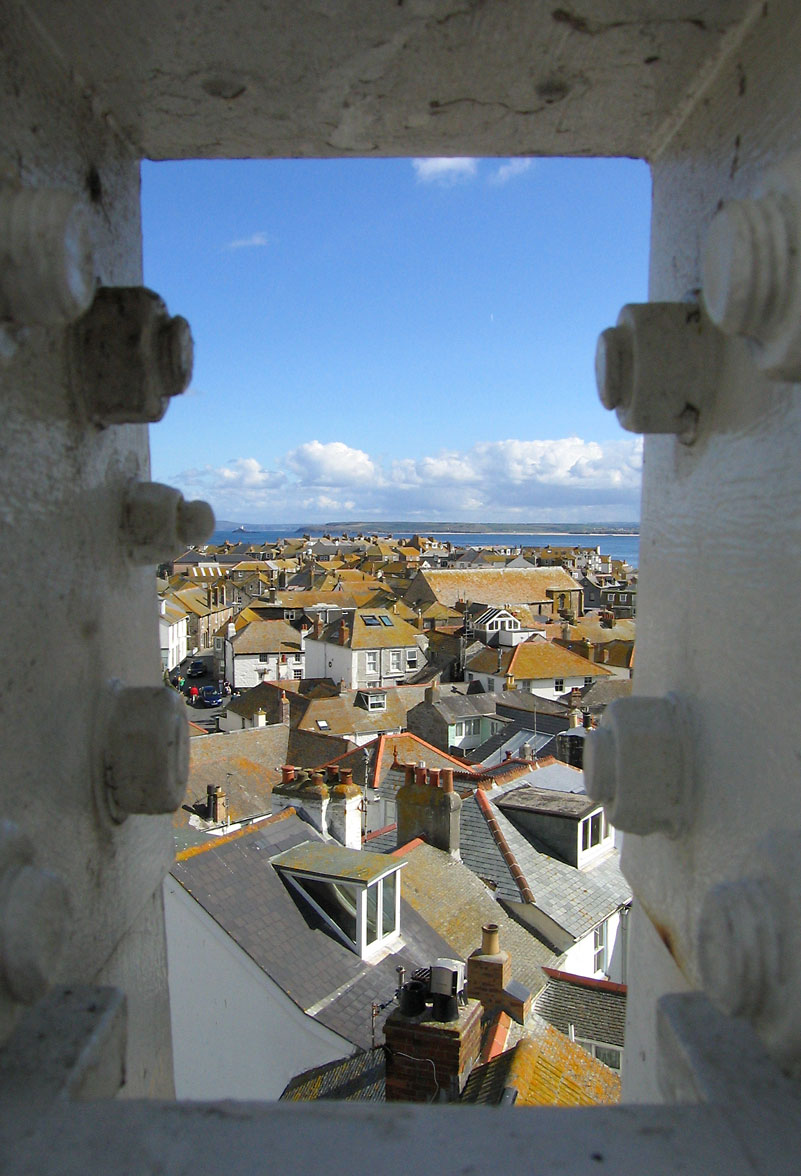
St Ives (Porth Ia) 11,435

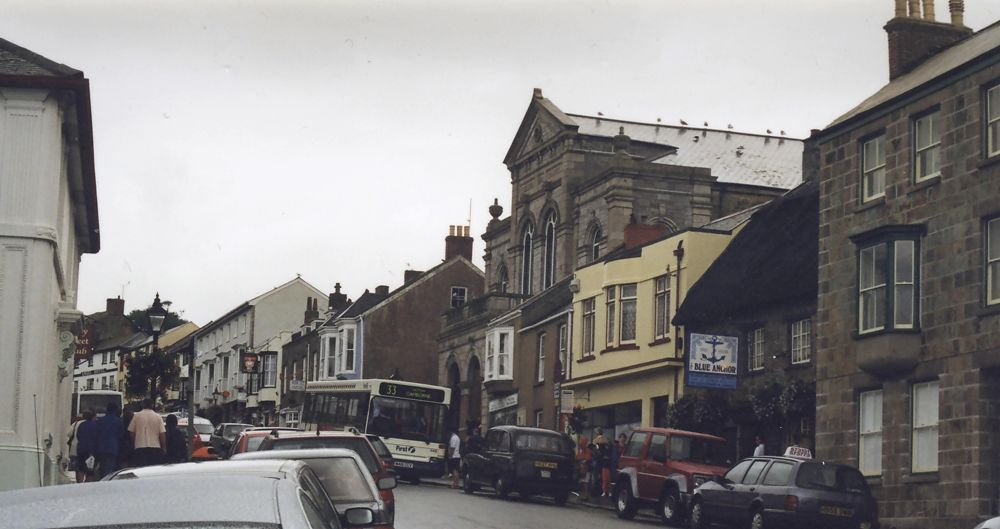
Helston (Hellys) 11,178

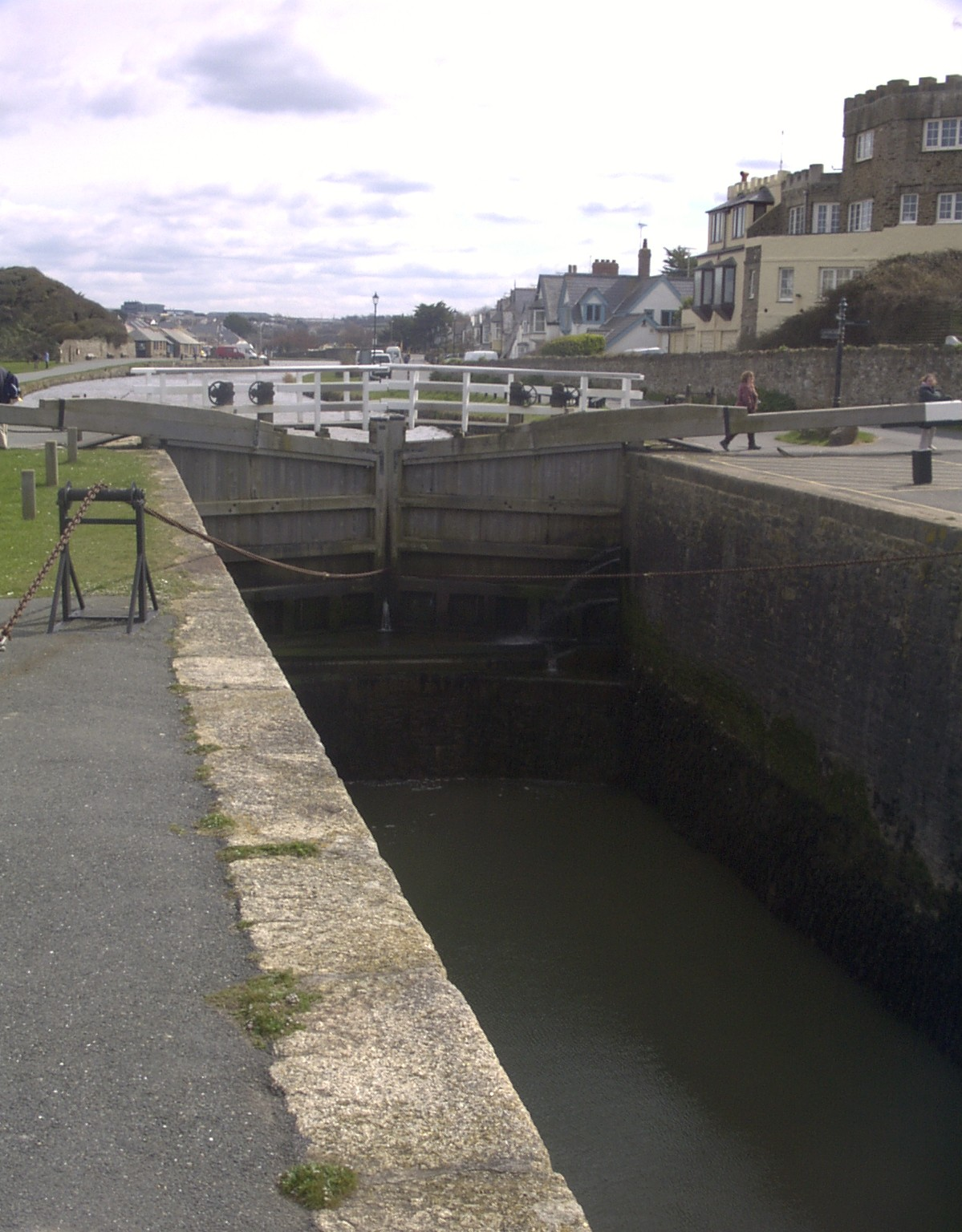
Bude (Porthbud) 9,934

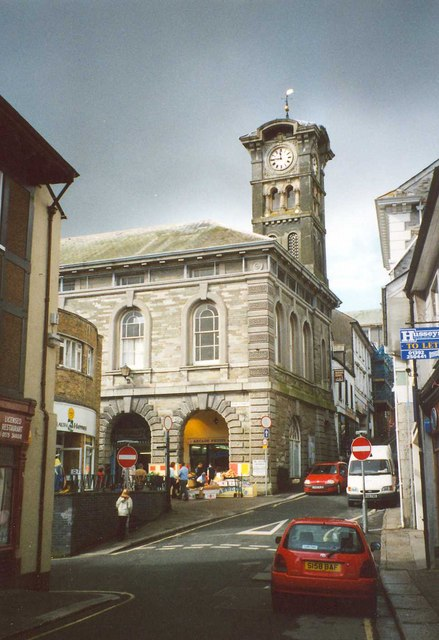
Liskeard (Lyskerrys) 9,417

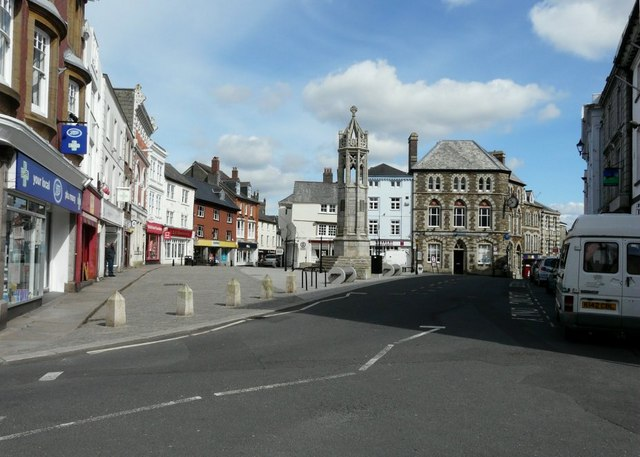
Launceston (Lannstevan) 9,216

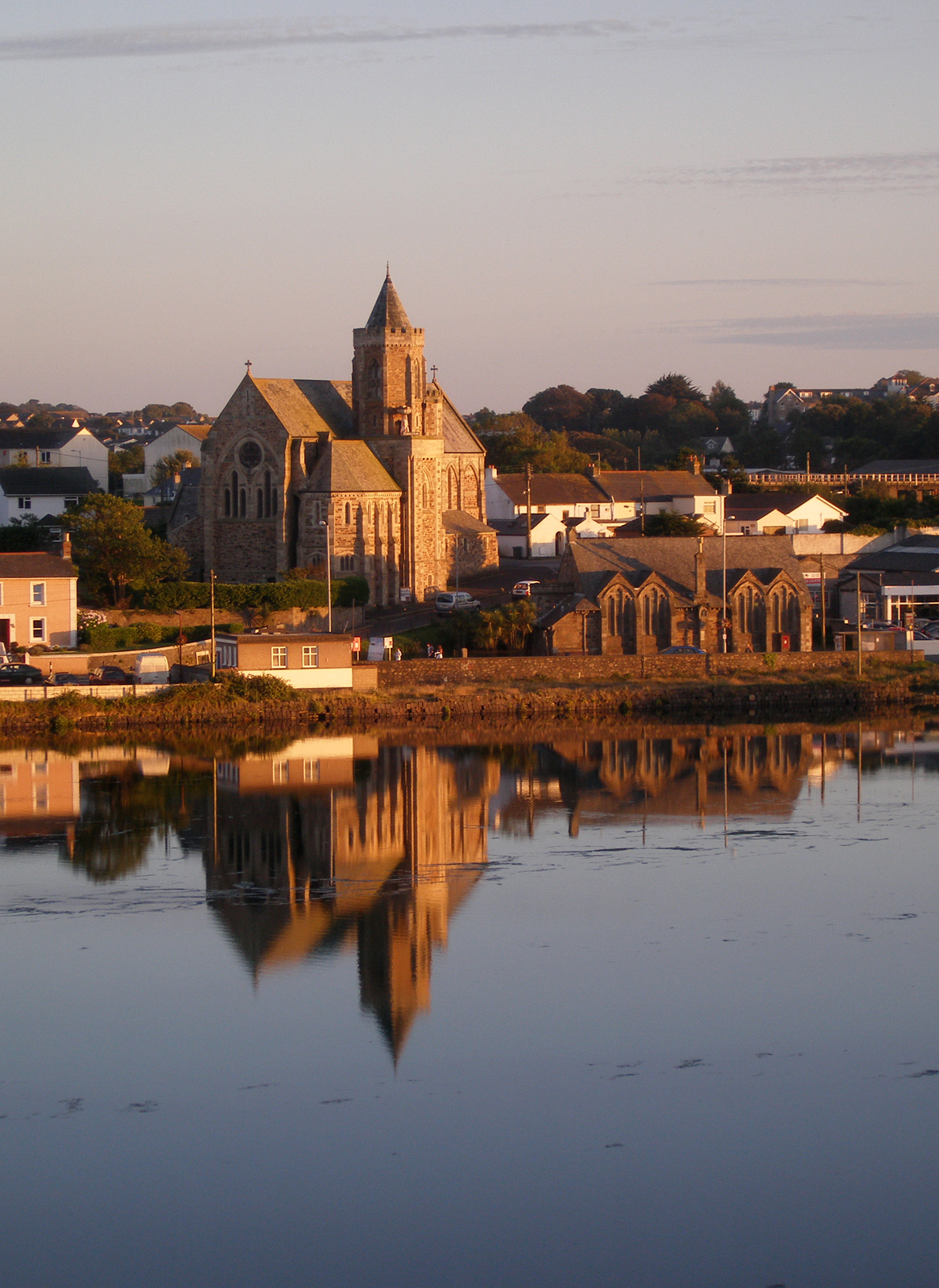
Hayle (Heyl) 8,939

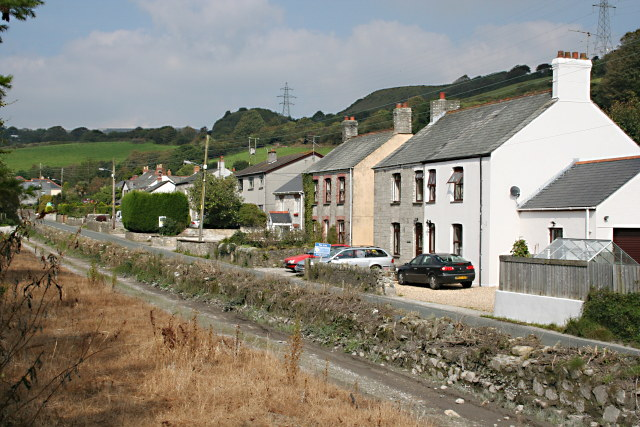
Treverbyn (Treverbyn) 8,016

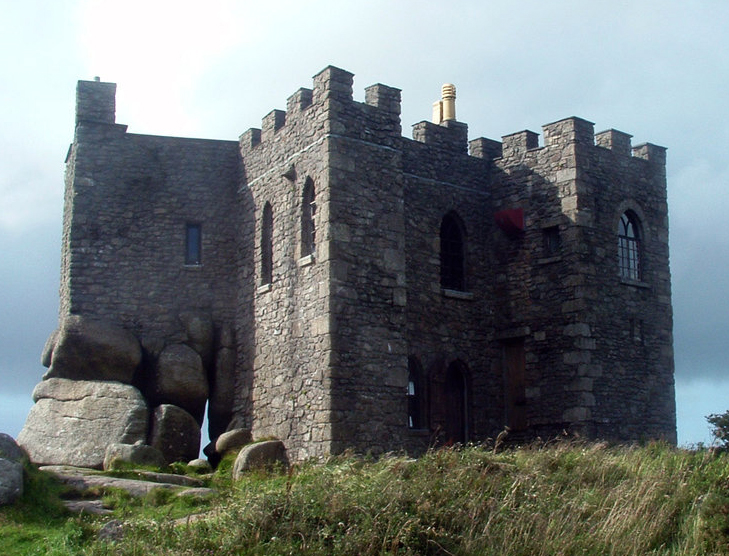
Carn Brea (Karnbre) 8,013

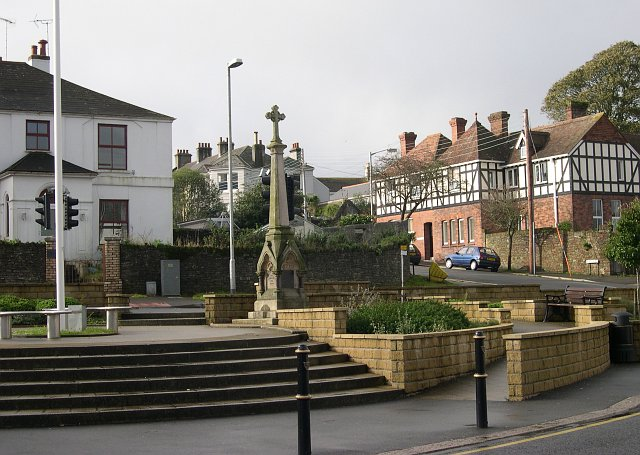
Torpoint (Penntorr) 7,717

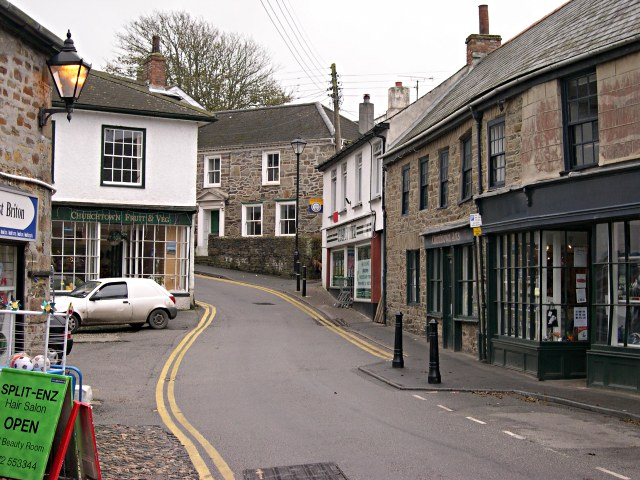
St Agnes (Breanek) 7,565

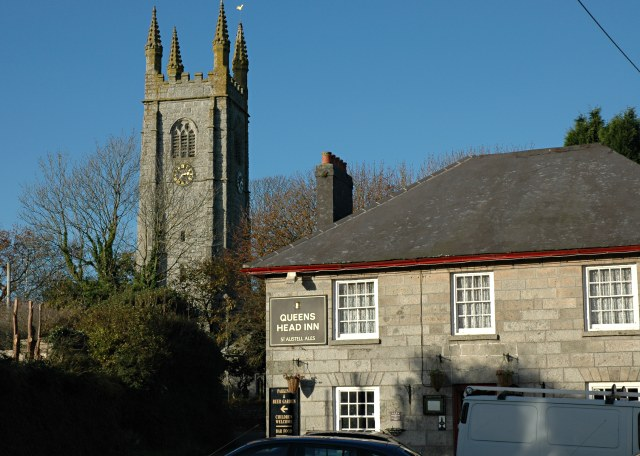
St Stephen-in-Brannel (Eglosstefan) 7,240

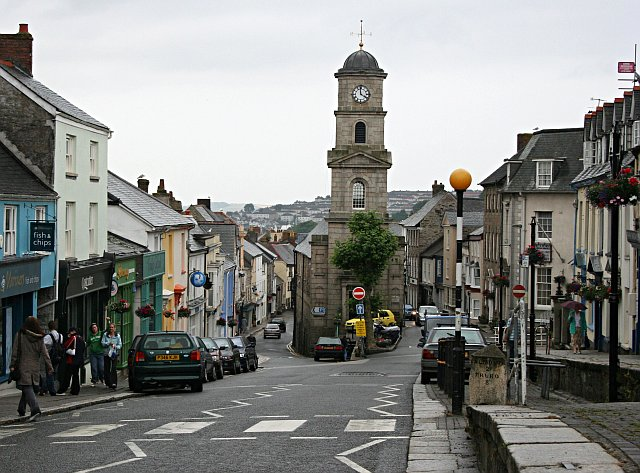
Penryn (Pennrynn) 7,093

== See also ==
- Cornwall
- Port Isaac
- List of towns and cities in England by population
