= List of settlements in Lancashire by population =

This is a list of settlements in Lancashire by population based on the results of the 2011 census. In 2011, there were 49 built-up area subdivisions with 5,000 or more inhabitants in Lancashire, shown in the table below.

A more recent United Kingdom census took place in 2021, but as of March 2024, the subdivision data has not yet been published.

== Population ranking ==
The "settlements" in this table are the "Built-up area subdivisions" used by the Office for National Statistics in the 2011 United Kingdom census. "Built-up areas" and their subdivisions were previously known as "Urban areas" and are defined as areas of built-up land of at least 20 hectares which are separated from other built-up areas by at least 200m. They were named algorithmically, based on the name of a city, town or other settlement found on Ordnance Survey mapping within the area. These areas do not always coincide with current or former local authority boundaries or other definitions of settlements: Bamber Bridge Built-up area subdivision, for example, had a 2011 population of 67,497 while the three electoral wards of Bamber Bridge East, Bamber Bridge North, and Bamber Bridge West had populations of 4,896, 4,665 and 4,384 respectively, totalling 13,945. Similarly, the town of Blackpool has a slightly higher population than its unitary authority, due to the urban subdivision including some small areas situated outside the district.

The 14 district centres
The 11 largest towns that are not district centres

#	Settlement District centre	District	Population	
#	Settlement District centre	District	2001	2011
1	Blackpool	Blackpool	148,300	147,663
2	Blackburn	Blackburn with Darwen	108,690	117,963
3	Preston	Preston	87,510	97,886
4	Burnley	Burnley	84,112	81,548
5	Bamber Bridge	South Ribble	65,780	67,497
6	Lancaster	Lancaster	46,330	48,085
7	Lytham St Annes	Fylde	40,720	42,953
8	Leyland	South Ribble	37,150	38,805
9	Chorley	Chorley	33,430	36,183
10	Fulwood	Preston	36,296	35,830
11	Accrington	Hyndburn	35,200	35,456
12	Skelmersdale	West Lancashire	34,500	34,455
13	Morecambe	Lancaster	34,241	33,432
14	Nelson	Pendle	29,000	29,463
15	Darwen	Blackburn with Darwen	27,557	28,155
16	Fleetwood	Wyre	26,560	25,359
17	Ormskirk	West Lancashire	23,660	24,073
18	Rawtenstall	Rossendale	22,618	23,128
19	Thornton	Wyre	17,610	18,941
20	Colne	Pendle	18,946	18,806
21	Poulton-le-Fylde	Wyre	17,130	17,430
22	Haslingden	Rossendale	15,330	15,969
23	Heysham	Lancaster	14,630	15,633
24	Clitheroe	Ribble Valley	14,697	14,765
25	Bacup	Rossendale	12,760	13,323
26	Kirkham	Fylde	11,440	11,915
27	Oswaldtwistle	Hyndburn	12,193	11,803
28	Great Harwood	Hyndburn	11,217	10,800
29	Cleveleys	Wyre	10,722	10,754
30	Barnoldswick	Pendle	10,524	10,435
31	Brierfield	Pendle	10,047	9,559
32	Adlington	Chorley	8,450	9,211
33	Longton	South Ribble	8,460	8,800
34	Burscough	West Lancashire	8,286	8,799
35	Tarleton	West Lancashire	8,210	8,582
36	Clayton-le-Moors	Hyndburn	8,290	8,522
37	Euxton	Chorley	7,690	8,118
38	Freckleton / Warton	Fylde	8,123	8,049
39	Coppull	Chorley	7,637	7,959
40	Longridge	Ribble Valley	7,491	7,526
41	Whitworth	Rossendale	7,263	7,500
42	Bolton-le-Sands	Lancaster	7,010	6,995
43	Garstang	Wyre	6,290	6,779
44	Rishton	Hyndburn	7,350	6,625
45	Carnforth	Lancaster	5,872	6,115
46	Barrowford	Pendle	5,261	5,521
47	Preesall	Wyre	5,050	5,367
48	Church	Hyndburn	4,881	5,186
49	Lancaster University	Lancaster	4,160	5,110

== Historic Lancashire ==
Historic Lancashire
All cities in both current and historic Lancashire appear in bold, as well as:
The settlements in current Lancashire
The settlements in Lancashire that are now in the Council Area of Greater Manchester
The settlements in Lancashire that are now in the Council Area of Merseyside
The settlements in Lancashire that are now in the Council Area of Cumbria
The settlements in Lancashire that are now in the Council Area of Cheshire

Historically, the county of Lancashire covered a much wider area before boundary changes were introduced in 1974. Some towns which formerly belonged to the county still strongly identify with it. Notable examples are Bolton, Bury, Heywood, Horwich, Leigh, Southport, St. Helens and Wigan, and as well as cities such as Manchester, Liverpool and Salford.

== See also ==
- Lancashire
- List of towns and cities in England by population
