= List of settlements in the East Riding of Yorkshire by population =

East Riding of Yorkshire's 14 largest settlements. The main administrative centre is in bold and district centres in yellow.

This is a list of settlements in the East Riding of Yorkshire by population based on the results of the 2021 census. The next United Kingdom census will take place in 2031. In 2021, there were 14 built-up area subdivisions with 5,000 or more inhabitants in the East Riding of Yorkshire, shown in the table below.

== Population ranking ==
| # | Settlement | Unitary Authority | Population | | | |
| # | Settlement | Unitary Authority | 2001 | 2011 | 2021 | Change (2011-2021) (%) |
|---|---|---|---|---|---|---|
| 1 | Kingston-upon-Hull | Kingston-upon-Hull | 243,589 | 256,406 | 270,810 | +5.6% |
| 2 | Bridlington | East Riding of Yorkshire | 33,590 | 35,154 | 34,845 | −0.9% |
| 3 | Beverley | East Riding of Yorkshire | 29,211 | 30,835 | 30,930 | +0.3% |
| 4 | Goole | East Riding of Yorkshire | 17,309 | 19,243 | 20,175 | +4.8% |
| 5 | Willerby | East Riding of Yorkshire | 18,665 | 18,724 | 19,260 | +2.9% |
| 6 | Hessle | East Riding of Yorkshire | 14,767 | 15,000 | 15,485 | +3.2% |
| 7 | Cottingham | East Riding of Yorkshire | 14,940 | 14,838 | 14,425 | −2.8% |
| 8 | Brough | East Riding of Yorkshire | 8,943 | 12,251 | 13,320 | +8.7% |
| 9 | Driffield | East Riding of Yorkshire | 11,244 | 12,808 | 13,215 | +3.2% |
| 10 | Pocklington | East Riding of Yorkshire | 7,632 | 8,337 | 10,120 | +21.4% |
| 11 | Hornsea | East Riding of Yorkshire | 8,244 | 8,432 | 8,790 | +4.2% |
| 12 | Hedon | East Riding of Yorkshire | 7,215 | 8,194 | 8,130 | −0.8% |
| 13 | Market Weighton | East Riding of Yorkshire | 5,212 | 6,429 | 7,460 | +16.0% |
| 14 | Withernsea | East Riding of Yorkshire | 5,701 | 5,880 | 5,765 | −2.0% |

== See also ==
- East Riding of Yorkshire
- List of towns and cities in England by population
