= List of settlements in Shropshire by population =

Shropshire's 13 largest settlements. The main administrative centre is in bold and district centres in yellow.

This is a list of settlements in Shropshire by population based on the results of the 2021 census. The next United Kingdom census will take place in 2031. In 2021, there were 13 built-up area subdivisions with 5,000 or more inhabitants in Shropshire, shown in the table below.

== Population ranking ==
#	Settlement	Unitary Authority	Population			
#	Settlement	Unitary Authority	2001	2011	2021	Change (2011–2021) (%)
1	Telford	Telford and Wrekin	134,014	141,262	156,910	+11.1%
2	Shrewsbury	Shropshire	66,535	71,090	76,015	+6.9%
3	Oswestry	Shropshire	15,613	17,105	17,510	+2.4%
4	Newport	Telford and Wrekin	12,137	12,741	14,196	+11.4%
5	Bridgnorth	Shropshire	11,618	12,315	12,175	−1.1%
6	Market Drayton	Shropshire	10,306	11,477	12,060	+5.1%
7	Ludlow	Shropshire	9,548	10,266	10,040	−2.2%
8	Whitchurch	Shropshire	8,503	9,552	9,855	+3.2%
9	Shifnal	Shropshire	6,017	6,332	8,980	+41.8%
10	Albrighton	Shropshire	6,294	6,179	6,985	+13.0%
11	Wem	Shropshire	5,142	5,870	6,280	+7.0%
12	Broseley	Shropshire	5,231	5,257	5,595	+6.4%
13	Bayston Hill	Shropshire	5,247	5,079	5,220	+2.8%

== See also ==
- Shropshire
- List of towns and cities in England by population
