= List of United Kingdom county nicknames =

This is a list of nicknames for counties of the United Kingdom. This includes the counties of England, Scotland, Northern Ireland and Wales. Counties are only included if they have a nickname.

== List ==
| County | Nickname | Origins and notes |
|---|---|---|
| County Antrim | The Glenmen | From the Glens of Antrim |
| County Armagh | The Orchard County; The Cathedral County | Due to large number of orchards Due to St Patrick's Cathedral (Church of Ireland) and St Patrick's Cathedral (Catholic) both being in the city of Armagh |
| Bedfordshire | Clangers | From Bedfordshire clangers |
| Berkshire | Berks; The Royal County | Shortening of Berkshire; Due to Windsor Castle being in the county |
| Berwickshire | Duns-shire | Due to Duns being the county town |
| Buckinghamshire | Bucks | Shortening of Buckinghamshire |
| Cambridgeshire | Cambs | Shortening of Cambridgeshire |
| Carmarthenshire | Carms / Sir Gar | Shortening of Carmarthenshire / Welsh for Carmarthenshire |
| Ceredigion | Cardiganshire | Ceredigion is from the ancient kingdom but Cardiganshire is sometimes colloquially used instead |
| Clackmannanshire | The Wee County | Smallest county in Scotland and the UK by area. |
| Cornwall | Kernow | Cornish name for Cornwall |
| Derbyshire | Derbys | Shortening of Derbyshire |
| Denbighshire / Sir Ddinbych | Denbs / Ddinbych | Shortening of Denbighshire / Shorthand from Welsh |
| County Down | The Mourne County | From the Mourne Mountains, named in turn for the ancient Gaelic Mugdorna tribe. |
| County Durham | Land of the Prince Bishops | From the Bishops of Durham. |
| County Fermanagh | The Maguire County | From the medieval lords, the Maguire (Mag Uidhir) family. |
| Fife | Kingdom of Fife | Referring to the old Kingdom of Fife |
| Flintshire / Sir y Fflint | Flints / Fflint | Shortening of Flintshire / Shorthand from Welsh |
| Gloucestershire | Glos The King's County | Shortening of Gloucestershire The current King, King Charles III, has his family residence in this county. |
| Hampshire | Hants; The Hog County; Jane Austen's County | Shortening of Hampshire; Wild boar hunting in the New Forest; Jane Austen born in Hampshire |
| Hertfordshire | Herts | Shortening of Hertfordshire |
| Isle of Anglesey / Ynys Môn | Môn | Shortened from the Welsh name for Anglesey |
| Isle of Wight | Vectis | Ancient Roman name for the county. Locals are called Vectensians |
| Kent | The Garden of England | From the county's produce of fruit and agricultural crops |
| Kincardineshire | The Mearns | From the Anglicisation of the Scots Gaelic word for The Stewartry |
| Lancashire | The Red Rose County | From the red rose symbol of the Duchy of Lancaster |
| Leicestershire | Leics | Shortening of Leicestershire |
| Lincolnshire | Lincs or yellowbellies | Shortening of Lincolnshire, old name for Lincoln’s yellow belly soldiers |
| County Londonderry | The Oak-Leaf County | Derry, an anglicisation of Doire, is Irish for oak grove, leading to an oak leaf being used on the county crest |
| Middlesex | The Capital County | Location of London, capital of England |
| Monmouthshire / Sir Fynwy | Mons / Fynwy | Shortening of Monmouthshire / Shorthand from Welsh |
| Norfolk | Nelson's County | Naval officer Horatio Nelson born in Norfolk. |
| Northamptonshire | Northants / Rose of the Shires | Shortening of Northamptonshire / Central position within England. |
| Northumberland | Northd | Shortening of Northumberland |
| Nottinghamshire | Notts Robin Hood's Country | Shortening of Nottinghamshire From the legend of Robin Hood. |
| Oxfordshire | Oxon | Shortening of Oxfordshire |
| Peeblesshire | Tweeddale | Due to being part of the district of Tweeddale |
| Pembrokeshire / Sir Benfro | Pembs / Benfro | Shortening of Pembrokeshire / Shorthand from Welsh |
| County Tyrone | The Red Hand County; The O'Neill County "Tyrone among the bushes" | From the Red Hand of Ulster on the county's GAA crest From the Uí Néill, medieval lords. Of unknown origin. Possibly popularised in a poem A Sigh for Old Times by Strabane poet William Collins |
| Shetland | Zetland | From the archaic spelling for Shetland |
| Shropshire | Salop | From old abbreviations for Shropshire |
| Staffordshire | Staffs | Shortening of Staffordshire |
| Sussex | Sx | Shortening of Sussex |
| Warwickshire | Warks | Abbreviation for Warwickshire |
| Wiltshire | The Moonraker County Wilts | Local gin-smuggling story. |
| Worcestershire | Worcs | Shortening of Worcestershire |
| Yorkshire | God's Own Country | Self-proclaimed |

== See also ==
- List of counties of the United Kingdom
- List of Irish county nicknames
