= Seaton, Cumbria =

Village in Cumbria, England

Coordinates: 54.665°N 3.523°W

Seaton
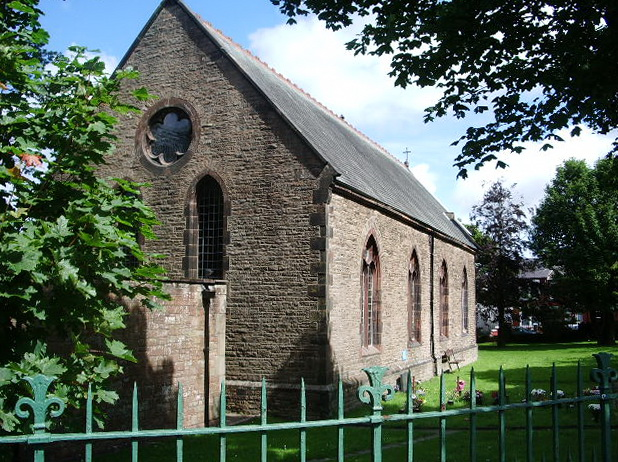
- St Paul's Church

- Location in Allerdale Location within Cumbria
- Population: 5,033 (2021)
- OS grid reference: NY018310
- Civil parish: Seaton
- Unitary authority: Cumberland
- Ceremonial county: Cumbria
- Region: North West
- Country: England
- Sovereign state: United Kingdom
- Post town: Workington
- Postcode district: CA14
- Dialling code: 01900
- Police: Cumbria
- Fire: Cumbria
- Ambulance: North West
- UK Parliament: Whitehaven and Workington

Seaton is a large village and civil parish in Cumbria, England. Historically part of Cumberland, it lies near the Lake District National Park. It is home to over 5,000 people and is one of the largest villages in England. At the 2021 census, the parish had a population of 5,033. It is situated on the north side of the River Derwent, across from the town of Workington, and close to the smaller village of Camerton. Seaton is part of the Cumberland unitary authority area. From 1974 to 2023 it was in the Borough of Allerdale.

== Toponymy ==
The name Seaton is believed to originate from the Old English name 'Sǣtūn'. where 'tūn' means 'homestead' or 'village', and 'sǣ' simply means 'sea'. However, since Seaton is over a mile away from the sea, this interpretation of the name is not certain.

== History ==
The earliest evidence of habitation in and around Seaton are the so-called 'Burrow Walls' less than a mile west of the village. These walls are the remains of a medieval manor house, itself built within the remains of a Roman fort believed to be called 'Magis'. It is believed the fort was built between 79 and 122 to guard the coast against attacks by the Scoti from Ireland and the Caledonii from Scotland.

Around 1100 the manor of Seaton was granted to a man named Orme on his marriage to Gunhild, sister of Waltheof, Lord of Allerdale and daughter of Gospatric, Earl of Northumbria. Orme's manor house was built on the same site as the old Roman fort, although a descendant, Patrick Culwen de Workington, pulled the house down and moved the family south across the river to Workington Hall. They would later adopt the surname Curwen, and generally used the title Lord of Workington, first obtained by Gospatric, son of Orme.

Traditionally, Seaton's economy was based on farming and mining. In 1762 Seaton Iron Works was established on the north bank of the River Derwent below the village at Barepot. It was a major concern at one time, employing hundreds of people, before its blast furnace ceased operation in 1857. The structures were demolished and there is very little trace remaining of the iron works today. The village experienced a large population increase during the 1800s caused by the boom of nearby Workington's steel industry. Workington's steel industry is now much smaller, and Seaton has become a dormitory settlement for other West Coast industries.

On 7 April 1964 Seaton was the site of the murder of John Alan West which led to the two final executions in the United Kingdom.

== Governance ==
The village is in the parliamentary constituency of Whitehaven and Workington.

For Local Government purposes it is in the Cumberland unitary authority area.

Seaton has its own Parish Council; Seaton Parish Council.

== Amenities ==
Amenities include: some small local shops, One Stop, a petrol station, two schools – Seaton Academy (formerly Infant School), and Seaton Junior Church of England school, a library, three pubs, a local Rugby league team, Seaton Rangers.

== Transport ==
=== Train ===
Seaton used to have a railway station on the Cleator and Workington Junction Railway, the station closed in 1922.

=== Bus ===
As of March 2026, Stagecoach operates two bus services. The number 60 to Workington or Skinburness via Maryport and Silloth and the twice-hourly 52 which serves Workington town centre and Harrington Railway Station via Salterbeck and Moorclose.

== See also ==
- Listed buildings in Seaton, Cumbria
