= Land and Property Gazetteer =

Land and Property Gazetteer may refer to:

- National Land and Property Gazetteer, an address infrastructure in England and Wales
- Local Land and Property Gazetteer, an address database maintained by each local authority in the United Kingdom

== See also ==
- National Address Gazetteer
- National Street Gazetteer
