= LPG =

LPG may refer to:

== Science ==
- Liquefied petroleum gas, a flammable mixture of hydrocarbon gases
- Lipophosphoglycan, a class of molecule found on the surface of some eukaryotes, in particular protozoa

== Music groups ==
- LPG (Dutch band), a Dutch indie-pop band
- LPG (South Korean group) (Lovely Pretty Girls), South Korean girl group that debuted in 2005
- LPG (American band), an American Christian hip-hop group

== Other uses ==
- Landwirtschaftliche Produktionsgenossenschaft (Agricultural Production Cooperative), the official designation for large, collectivised farms in former East Germany
- Llanfairpwll railway station (National Rail station code), Wales
- Universal Track Carrier LPG, a Polish armoured personnel carrier
- Lycée Paul-Gauguin, a secondary school in Papeete, Tahiti
- Liberal Party of Gibraltar, a political party in Gibraltar
- Leisure Pass Group, the former name for the travel company Go City
- Labeled property graphs, a widely used graph data model

== See also ==
- Local Land and Property Gazetteer (LLPG)
- National Land and Property Gazetteer (NLPG)
