= Post town =

Part of British postal addresses

- Category: Postal administration unit
- Location: United Kingdom
- Found in: Postcode areas
- Number: ~1,500 (as of 2013)
- Government: Royal Mail
- Subdivisions: Postcode districts

A post town is a required part of all postal addresses in the United Kingdom and Ireland, and a basic unit of the postal delivery system. Including the correct post town in the address increases the chance of a letter or parcel being delivered on time. Post towns in general originated as the location of delivery offices. As of 2004, their main function is to distinguish between localities or street names in addresses not including a postcode.

== Organisation ==
There are approximately 1,500 post towns which are organised by Royal Mail subject to its policy only to impose changes where it has a proven, economic and practical benefit to the organisation, covering its own cost. Each post town usually corresponds to one or more postal districts (the "outward" part of the postcode, before the space); therefore, each post town can cover an area comprising many towns, urban districts and villages. Post towns rarely correspond exactly to administrative boundaries and their associated physical features. As such they often group a small minority of neighbourhoods, streets or houses together with a main settlement in a different county, area of local government or administration (including healthcare trust), constituency, European statistical region and/or traditional parish. This was a main reason why postal counties were abolished (but not prohibited) in 1996.

In some places several post towns cover a single postal district (with each post town corresponding to one or more of its postcode sectors). There are anomalies where post towns and postcode sectors have a more unusual co-relation. For example, the postcode sector EH14 5 is split between three post towns: Juniper Green, Currie and Balerno. Its other postcode sectors are generally limited to one of these.

== Usage ==
Royal Mail states that the post town must be included on all items and should be clearly written in capitals.

1 Vallance Road
LONDON
E2 1AA

The use of postcodes means that it is no longer necessary to include the former postal county in a postal address. Some post towns, known as special post towns, never required the inclusion of a postal county, either because the town was large or because it gave its name to the county.

=== Locality ===
In most places, additional locality information such as a village or suburb name is optionally added above the post town, giving a more specific location: the two largest "post town" cities named, for example, have many roads of the same name in different localities and the additional locality information is therefore essential if the postcode is wrongly recorded or unknown.

Where this is a disambiguating feature, Royal Mail terms this the "dependent locality". For a limited number of addresses a "double dependent locality" line is also required, preceding the dependent locality line: some examples include "Churwell, Morley, Leeds" and "Marton, Sinnington, York".

Locality information other than the post town is not always part of the official postal address. In particular, within the London post town, each postcode district name (which can conflict with administrative boundaries, see above) corresponds to a numbered postcode district and is therefore not required in the postal address whenever the postcode is used. For example, "Bethnal Green" is the name of the "E2" postcode district and is optional in the following address:

1 Vallance Road
Bethnal Green
LONDON
E2 1AA

If no valid postcode is provided, or if the sorting machine rejects the letter, the use of optional locality or county information may assist manual sorting. In the absence of a full valid postcode, locality often prevents ambiguity where there is more than one street with the same name covered by a post town or postcode district, or where post towns in different counties have the same name.

=== Via ===
Traditionally only, where a place such as a village was served by a post town entirely distinct from its location, the word "Via" or "Near" ("Nr.") was added before the post town. For example:

1 High Street
Cuffley
Nr. POTTERS BAR
EN6 1AA

However, the Royal Mail discourages this usage because their optical character recognition technology and Mailsort lookup tables check for the post town at the beginning of a line if the postcode is missing, unreadable or incorrect. Additionally, "Near" and "Nr." can be confused with "North".

== See also ==
- Postcode Address File
- Postcodes in the United Kingdom
