= Lieutenancy area =

Separate areas of the United Kingdom appointed a lord-lieutenant

- Category: County
- Location: United Kingdom
- Created by: Lieutenancies Act 1997 & the Northern Ireland (Lieutenancy) Order 1975
- Created: 1997 (GB), 1975 (NI)
- Number: 99 (as of 2008)
- Possible types: England (48); Northern Ireland (8); Scotland (35); Wales (8)
- Populations: 8,000–8,167,000
- Areas: 3–8,611 km^{2}

Lieutenancy areas (/lɛfˈtɛnənsi/), officially counties and areas for the purposes of the lieutenancies, are the areas of the United Kingdom that are appointed to a lord-lieutenant – a representative of the British monarch. In many cases they have similar demarcation and naming to, but are not necessarily coterminous with, the counties of the United Kingdom.

== Origin ==
In England, lieutenancy areas are colloquially known as the ceremonial counties, although this phrase does not appear in any legislation referring to them. The lieutenancy areas of Scotland are subdivisions of Scotland that are more or less based on the counties of Scotland, making use of the major cities as separate entities. In Wales, the lieutenancy areas are known as the preserved counties of Wales and are based on those used for lieutenancy and local government between 1974 and 1996. The lieutenancy areas of Northern Ireland correspond to the six counties and two former county boroughs.

== Map ==
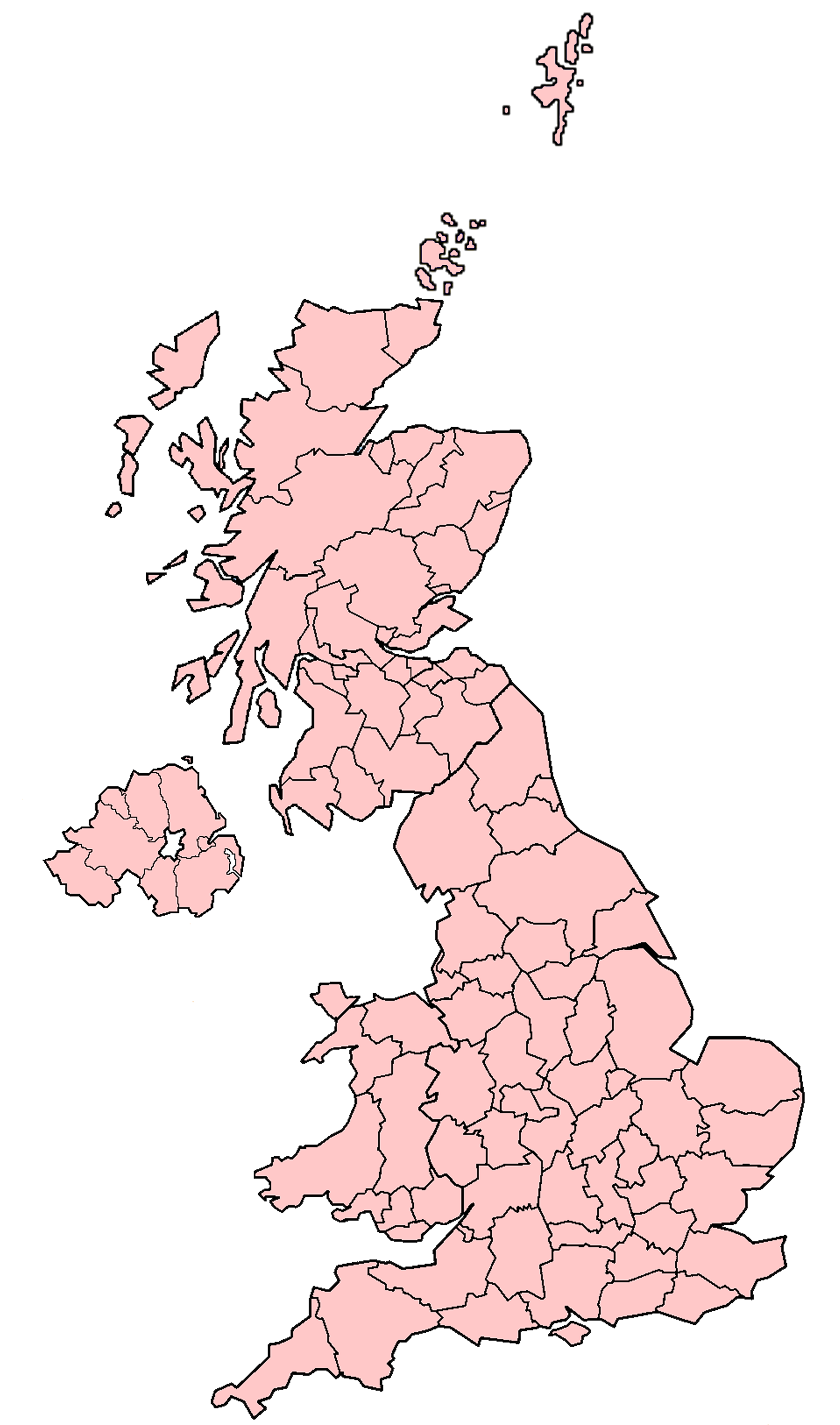

Not shown: City of London

== See also ==
- Historic counties of the United Kingdom
- List of lord-lieutenants in the United Kingdom
