= Postcodes in the United Kingdom =

Map of postcode areas in the United Kingdom and Crown dependencies, with links to each postcode area

Postal codes used in the United Kingdom, British Overseas Territories and Crown dependencies are known as postcodes (originally, postal codes). They are alphanumeric, and the UK is one of only 11 countries or territories to use alphanumeric codes out of the 192 members of the UPU.

Postcodes are essentially a location specific routing instruction. The codes designate 121 geographic postcode areas which are mnemonically named after the area's major post town (such as TR for TRuro) although some are named after smaller towns or regional areas. Each postcode area is subdivided into districts, which in turn are subdivided into sectors. A full postcode identifies a group of addresses (typically around ten) or a major delivery point.

The current postcode system evolved from named postal districts introduced in London in 1857 and gradually in other large cities from the 1860s onwards. Districts in London were then subdivided in 1917, with each allocated a distinct number. This was extended to other cities by 1934. The current system (building on the earlier postal districts) was devised by the General Post Office (Royal Mail) and was adopted nationally in stages between 1959 and 1974.

The system was designed with a single objective, to aid (the now) Royal Mail in mechanised sorting of mail for delivery. Since its roll-out, changes in business needs and new technology have meant that postcodes are now also used in many differing ways: they serve as aggregation units in census enumeration; designate destinations in route planning software, and help calculate insurance premiums.

Royal Mail is statutorily responsible for allocation of all postcodes and it continuously maintains the Postcode Address File (PAF) database, which stores address data for around 32 million addresses and around 1.8m postcodes. The PAF (and access to its data) is overseen by the independent PAF Advisory Board and Ofcom, which regulates communication services in the UK.

== History ==
=== Earlier postal districts ===
==== London ====
London was the first city in the United Kingdom (and the world) to design and adopt a postal code system. On inception (in 1857/8), London was divided into ten postal districts: EC (East Central), WC (West Central), N, NE, E, SE, S, SW, W, and NW, covering a circle with a radius of 10 miles from central London. The initials of the named districts were to be appended to the street address. In 1866 the North East district (NE) was abolished and merged into East (E) district. In 1868, the South (S) district was also abolished, with different parts merged into South East (SE) and South West (SW) districts. Some older road signs in Hackney still show the short-lived North East (NE) district.

==== Other large cities and towns ====
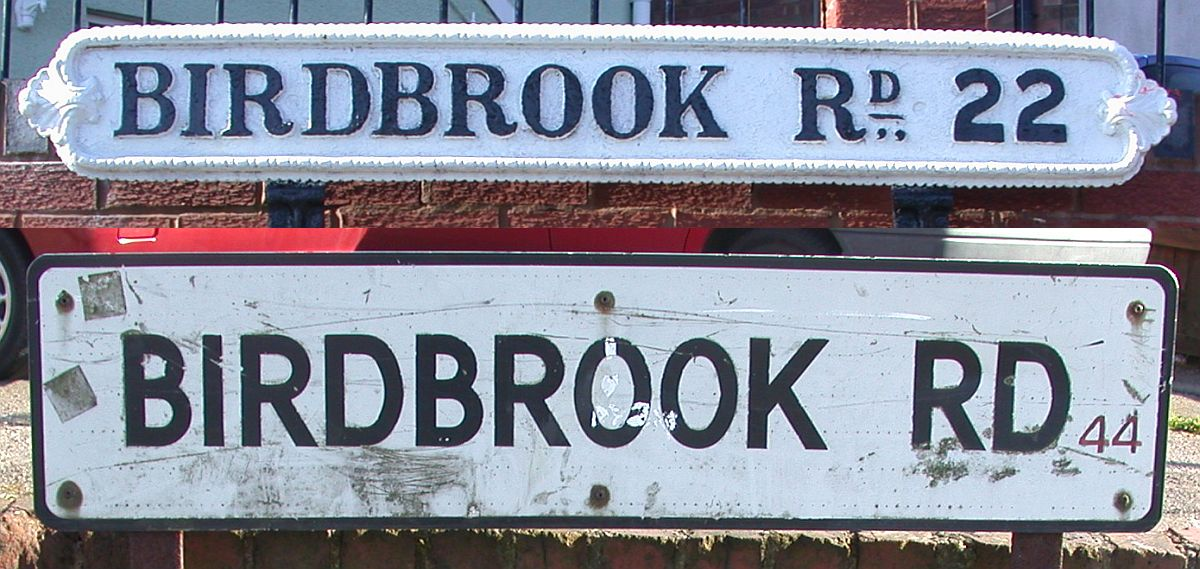
Street name signs on Birdbrook Road, Great Barr, Birmingham, showing old "Birmingham 22" postal district (top) and modern "B44" postcode.

Following the successful introduction of postal districts in London, the system was extended to other large towns and cities. Liverpool was divided into Eastern, Northern, Southern and Western districts in 1864/65, and Manchester and Salford into eight numbered districts in 1867/68.

==== Urban areas – numbered districts ====
In 1917, as a wartime measure to improve efficiency, each postal district in London was subdivided into sub-districts each identified by a number; the area served directly by the district head office was allocated the number 1; the other numbers were allocated alphabetically by delivery office, e.g. N2 East Finchley delivery office, N3 Finchley delivery office, N4 Finsbury Park delivery office etc. Since then these sub-districts have changed little.

In 1917, Dublin—then still part of the United Kingdom—was similarly divided into numbered postal districts. These continue in use in a modified form by An Post, the postal service of the Republic of Ireland.

In 1923, Glasgow was divided in a similar way to London, with numbered districts preceded by a letter denoting the compass point (C, W, NW, N, E, S, SW, SE).

In January 1932 the Postmaster General approved the designation of some predominantly urban areas into numbered districts. In November 1934 the Post Office announced the introduction of numbered districts (short postal codes) in "every provincial town in the United Kingdom large enough to justify it". Pamphlets were issued to each householder and business in the chosen ten areas (Birmingham, Brighton/Hove, Bristol, Edinburgh, Glasgow, Leeds/Bradford, Liverpool, Manchester/Salford, Newcastle-upon-Tyne, Sheffield) notifying them of the number of the district in which their premises lay. The pamphlets included a map of the districts, and copies were made available at local head post offices. The public were "particularly invited" to include the district number in the address at the head of letters.

A publicity campaign in the following year encouraged the use of the district numbers. The slogan for the campaign was "For speed and certainty always use a postal district number on your letters and notepaper". A poster was fixed to every pillar box in the affected areas bearing the number of the district and appealing for the public's co-operation. Every post office in the numbered district was also to display this information. Printers of Christmas cards and stationery were requested to always include district numbers in addresses, and election agents for candidates in the upcoming general election were asked to ensure they correctly addressed the 100 million items of mail they were expected to post. Businesses were issued with a free booklet containing maps and listings of the correct district number for every street in the ten areas.

Changes were made in towns which had already created postal districts: e.g. in Liverpool, the four compass point districts were expanded and districts were allocated numbers such as Liverpool 8 for Toxteth; a single numbering sequence was shared by Manchester and Salford: letters would be addressed to Manchester 1 or Salford 7 (lowest digits, respectively); some Birmingham codes were sub-divided with a letter, such as Great Barr, Birmingham 22 or Birmingham 22a, as can still be seen on many older street-name signs.

=== Modern postcode system ===
The Post Office experimented with electro-mechanical sorting machines in the late 1950s. These devices presented an envelope to an operator, who would press a button indicating which bin to sort the letter into. Postcodes were suggested to increase the efficiency of this process by removing the need for the sorter to remember the correct sorting for as many places. In January 1959 the Post Office analysed the results of a survey on public attitudes towards the use of postal codes, and committed to choosing a town in which to experiment with codes. The envisaged format for the new post code was a six-character alphanumeric code in two parts, with three letters designating the geographical area and three numbers identifying the individual address. On 28 July Ernest Marples, the Postmaster General, announced that Norwich had been selected, and that each of the 150,000 private and business addresses would receive a code by October. Norwich was selected as it already had eight automatic mail sorting machines in use. The original Norwich format consisted of "NOR", followed by a space, then a two-digit number (which, unlike the current format, could include a leading zero), and finally a single letter (instead of the two final letters in the current format).

In October 1965, Tony Benn as Postmaster General announced that postal coding was to be extended to the rest of the country in the next few years.

On 1 May 1967 postcodes were next introduced in Croydon. The many postcodes for central Croydon began with "CRO", while those of the surrounding post towns with CR2, CR3 and CR4. The uniform system of a set of three final characters after the space (such as 0AA, known as the inward code) was adopted. This was to be the beginning of a ten-year plan, costing an estimated £24 million. Within two years it was expected that full coding would be used in Aberdeen, Belfast, Brighton, Bristol, Bromley, Cardiff, Coventry, Manchester, Newcastle upon Tyne, Newport, Reading, Sheffield, Southampton and the Western district of London. Newcastle upon Tyne and Sheffield were allocated NE and S respectively, which had been created originally in London, but later abolished. By 1967, codes had been introduced to Aberdeen, Southampton, Brighton and Derby. In 1970, codes were introduced to the London Western and North Western postal districts. In December 1970, much Christmas mail was postmarked with the message "Remember to use the Postal Code" although codes were used to sort mail in only a handful of sorting offices.

The original London post town covers only 40% of the administrative area of Greater London (created in 1965). 60% of Greater London's area has postcodes in 13 other postcode areas and post towns (BR, CM, CR, DA, EN, HA, IG, KT, RM, SM, TN, TW, UB).

Many existing postal districts were incorporated into the new national system so that postcodes in Toxteth (Liverpool 8) start with L8. The districts in both Manchester and Salford gained M postcodes, so Salford 7 became M7 and so on (and similarly in Brighton and Hove, both using the prefix BN). In other cases, the district numbers were replaced with unrelated numbers. In Glasgow, as a result of the transposition of the earlier compass point districts to "G" districts (C1 became G1, W1 became G11, N1 became G21, E1 became G31, S1 became G41, SW1 became G51, and so on) many of the available G districts have not been allocated (and to do so would disrupt the geographical consistency of the existing numbered districts).

During 1971, occupants of addresses began to receive notification of their postcode. Asked in the House of Commons about the completion of the coding exercise, the Minister of State for Posts and Telecommunications (whose role superseded that of Postmaster General in 1969), Sir John Eden, stated that it was expected to be completed during 1972. The scheme was finalised in 1974 when Norwich was completely re-coded but the scheme tested in Croydon was sufficiently close to the final design for it to be retained, with CRO standardised as CR0 (district zero) thus removing the need to create a CR1 district.

A quirk remained: the central Newport (Gwent) area was allocated NPT at a similar time to Croydon becoming CRO, and surrounding areas were (as today) allocated NP1–NP8. NPT lasted until the end of 1984 when it was recoded NP9.

Girobank's GIR 0AA was the last UK postcode with a fully alphabetical outward code. That code no longer exists in the Royal Mail's PAF, but was taken over by the bank's current owners, Santander UK.

==== Adaptation of earlier systems into national system ====
In London (as postally defined), postal districts created and mapped in 1917 remain unchanged today despite Greater London, created in April 1965, covering a much larger administrative area. The London post town covers 40% of Greater London and the remaining. Additionally, there were too few postcodes available to meet the level of demand of addresses in districts in central London (particularly in the WC and EC areas), so these were subdivided further with the resulting districts numbered with a letter suffix following the number of the predecessor district, so as to retain the familiar codes. The PAF refers to these subdivisions as districts.

== Structure, formatting and validation ==
=== Overview ===
Postcodes are alphanumeric, and are variable in length, ranging from six to eight characters (including a space); and also in format (there are six valid formats for postcodes currently listed in the PAF). Each postcode is divided into two parts separated by a single space: the outward code and the inward code. The outward code comprises the postcode area followed by the postcode district. The inward code comprises the postcode sector followed by the postcode unit. The postcode for China Street, Lancaster is LA1 1EX and its four components are shown below:

POSTCODE
Outward code		Inward code	
Area	District	Sector	Unit
LA	1	1	EX

=== Outward code ===
The outward code is the first part of the postcode. It is between two and four characters long and must be in one of six formats. It is followed by a single space which separates it from the inward code.

==== Postcode area ====
The postcode area is part of the outward code. There are 121 UK geographical postcode areas. The postcode area in most cases comprises two alphabetical characters; however there are eight single character postcode areas (five cities: B Birmingham, G Glasgow, L Liverpool, M Manchester/Salford, S Sheffield; and three London areas: E London East, N London North, W London West).

Postcodes areas generally do not wholly align with historical county or current local authority boundaries, and can also cross national boundaries. The phenomenon whereby postcodes overlap administrative/national boundaries is known as 'straddling'. Some postcodes straddle England's borders with Wales and Scotland, such as CH1 4QJ (Note: Bank Farm is in England, Cottage Garage in Wales) and DG14 0TF. (Note: Marchbank Cottage is in England, Willowbrae in Scotland.) This has led to British Sky Broadcasting subscribers receiving the wrong BBC and ITV regions, and newly licensed radio amateurs being given incorrect call signs.

===== Postcode area names =====
Postcode areas are, mostly, named after a major town or city (such as NR for Norwich). Some are named after a smaller town (e.g. Southall postcode area is UB after UxBridge) or a combination of towns (e.g. SM appears to be named after Sutton and Morden, and IG appears to be named after Ilford and BarkinG). A small number are named for the region surrounding the main post town (HS for Stornoway, Outer HebrideS; FY for Blackpool, located in the FYlde region; ME for Rochester, part of the MEdway conurbation; DG for Dumfries, Dumfries & Galloway region; TD for Galashiels, TweedDale; TS for Cleveland, TeesSide; SP for Salisbury, Salisbury Plain; ZE for Lerwick, Shetland, formerly titled ZEtland). The mnemonic (for all areas other than London) features various combinations - most commonly, first two letters (CH for CHester); first and last letters (BH for BournemoutH); first and key syllable letters (IV for InVerness).

In the case of London (a Post Town), there is not a single "London" postcode area (such as "LO"); rather there are eight, formerly 10 areas (currently N, E, EC, SE, SW, W, WC and NW) reflecting the preceding system for coding London based on compass points.

In the case of Northern Ireland, the entire province has a single postcode area BT (named for BelfasT).

==== Postcode district ====
The postcode district is one digit, two digits or (in some London postcode areas only) a digit followed by a letter. It usually contains one but sometimes two or more post towns.

===== Postcode district numbering =====
As a general rule, postcode districts are numbered consecutively from 1, with the exceptions of:

- numbering from 0: BL, BS, CM, CR, FY, HA, PR, SL and SS
- numbering from 10: AB, LL, SO

In most postcode areas, the central part of the post town for which the postcode area is named will have the district number 1 e.g. B1 (central Birmingham). In addition, the postcode "aa1 1AA" was often (though not universally) allocated to the crown or principal post office in the central postcode district.

The allocation of postcode district numbers, in most cases, is from the main post town outward e.g. Halifax which has seven districts numbered consecutively HX1 to HX7. There are a number of different numbering allocations and exceptions to this general approach:

- geographical direction: e.g. the Outer Hebrides postcode area HS, where the districts are numbered from north to south
- geographic reality: particularly in larger postcode areas, the scale of the districts discourages consecutive numbering e.g. in the NE postcode area, NE50 to NE60 are not allocated due to the substantial distance between NE49 (Haltwhistle) and the next district to be numbered (Morpeth, which was numbered NE61 rather than NE50), recognising the geographic separation of districts in the west (up to NE49) from those to the north (NE61 upwards).
- clusters: particularly if the postcode area encompasses several major towns or cities (e.g. S postcode area with Sheffield S1–S36, Chesterfield S40–S49, Rotherham S60–S65, Barnsley S70–S75 and Worksop S80–S81)
- alphabetical order of district sub-offices: used only in London postcode areas (e.g. E2 is Bethnal Green, E3 is Bow, E4 is Chingford etc., which results in intuitive anomalies such as SE1 and SE2 being far from neighbours, with SE1 being large part of Central London south of the Thames (Waterloo and the borough of Southwark) and SE2 covering Abbey Wood at the far eastern end of the Elizabeth Line (in the boroughs of Greenwich and Bexley).
- earlier districts: where preceding postal districts have been adopted into the current system (such as Glasgow's "compass points") or translated from the postcode pilot phase (such as Croydon's CRO becoming CR0 rather than CR1).
- new postcode districts: new postcode districts are occasionally created, usually due to increased demand for addresses following housing/business development and exhaustion of available postcodes for the existing district. There appear to be no clear rules for numbering new districts. Sequential or connected numbers are issued, if available. If no sequential numbers are available, then new non-consecutive numbers are allocated. For example, in the CV postcode area, the CV47 district was formed in 1999 from parts of the CV23 and CV33 districts, where the highest numbered district then allocated was CV37. Royal Mail has also introduced postcode overlays, where unallocated sectors are superimposed on an area with an existing sector, in order to avoid recoding the entire district.
- transfer of postcode districts: postcode districts can be transferred for operational reasons e.g. PH49 and PH50 postcode districts which resulted from the transfer and recoding of PA39 and PA40 districts (PH39 and PH40 were already allocated although PH45–PH48 were not allocated). This also occurred with the creation of the HS postcode area, the only new geographic postcode area created since 1973, from the previous PA80 to PA87 districts.
- possibility of confusion: written clarity appears to have sometimes been a factor. For instance, in the LL postcode area (covering North Wales), the districts start at LL11 (which is in itself unusual for being Wrexham, not the expected Llandudno), as LL1-LL9 could be written very similarly to L11-L19 (which are in Liverpool). Another example is with the B postcode area (Birmingham), which has B50, but not B51-B59, for they could be confused for BS1-BS9 (in Bristol), and similarly has B80 but not B81-B89 so as not to be confused with BB1-BB9 (in Lancashire).

London uniquely uses letters for subdivisions of some of its original postcode districts (E1, N1, W1, WC1, WC2, EC1–EC4, NW1, SE1, SW1) with letters used predominately in three areas: W (W1), WC (WC1 and WC2) and EC (EC1–EC4), these being the most central areas with the densest concentration of addresses. The districts are geographically extremely small. The subdivisions are effectively postcode districts in their own right, and are referred to as such in the PAF. Although these new smaller districts could have been given double digit numbers, consistent with postcode districts outside London (e.g. for WC1 in the range WC10-WC19 and for WC2 in the range WC20-WC29), this was not done. Using double-digit numbering might have encountered resistance due to their "micro-size" and also due to the long-standing use and familiarity of "WC1" etc. which signified in some cases a cultural or wealth status which may have been diluted or lost if re-coded from WC1 to, say, WC15.

Even if London had dropped the initial compass points systems to create a single post code area, at the time of the national post code programme 1959–1974, the challenge of the large number of districts (169) for one post town would have required a bespoke naming and numbering system.

Accordingly, many postcode districts are not physically contiguous, despite the inference from their numbering. Likewise, the centrality of a postcode district within a postcode area cannot be reliably inferred from the postcode alone.

==== Post towns ====
Post towns are not part of the postcode but are an important component of complete post address. Larger post towns may use more than one postcode district, for example Crawley uses RH10 and RH11. In a minority of cases, a single number can cover two or more post towns – for example, the WN8 district includes Wigan and Skelmersdale post towns; and the GL17 district contains five post towns.

=== Inward code ===
The inward code is the part of the postcode after the single space in the middle. It is always three characters long. The inward code assists in the delivery of post within a postal district (examples of inward codes are "0NY", "7GZ", "7HF", or "8JQ").

==== Postcode sector ====
The postcode sector is made up of a single digit (the first character of the inward code). Most postcode districts do not use all of the sectors 0–9 in order to allow for the possibility of more sectors being added in the face of new development. When postcodes were initially allocated, neighbouring postcode districts were often assigned to contain the sectors between them, with five sectors being allocated to each district, and thus avoiding duplication of sectors in geographically close districts. For example, across the three postcode districts BS6-8 (which are next to each other in north west Bristol), sectors 1-4 were assigned to BS8, sectors 5-7 were assigned to BS6, and sectors 8, 9 and 0 were assigned to BS7 (more recent changes have resulted in all three of those areas now having a sector 9).

==== Postcode unit ====
The postcode unit is two characters added to the end of the postcode sector. A postcode unit generally represents a street, part of a street, a single address, a group of properties, a single property, a sub-section of the property, an individual organisation or (for instance, in the case of Driver and Vehicle Licensing Agency) a subsection of the organisation. The level of discrimination is often based on the amount of mail received by the premises or business.

=== Validation ===
The format is as follows, where A signifies a letter and 9 a digit:

Format	Coverage	Example
AA9 9AA	All postcodes except those listed below	CR2 6XH
AA99 9AA	All postcodes except those listed below	DN55 1PT
A9 9AA	B, E, G, L, M, N, S, W	M1 1AE
A99 9AA	B, E, G, L, M, N, S, W	B33 8TH
A9A 9AA	London postcodes in districts starting: E1, N1, W1	W1A 0AX
AA9A 9AA	London postcodes in: WC postcode area; districts starting EC1–EC4 and SW1; and districts NW1W, SE1P	EC1A 1BB

Notes:

1. As all formats end with 9AA, the outward code (the first part of the postcode) can easily be extracted by ignoring the last three characters.
2. Areas with only single-digit districts: BL, BR, FY, HA, HD, HG, HR, HS, HX, JE, LD, SM, SR, WC, WN, ZE (although WC is always subdivided by a further letter, e.g. WC1A).
3. Areas with only double-digit districts: AB, LL, SO (AB and SO were recoded due to postcode exhaustion. AB: all original five districts AB1-AB5 were recoded by adding a second digit, example AB1 was divided into AB10-AB16; SO: original single-digit districts SO1-SO2 were recoded as SO14-SO19. LL: double digit districts were allocated to minimise confusion with visually similar postcodes in neighbouring L Liverpool).
4. Areas with no district 1: CR and double digit districts (AB, LL, SO).
5. Areas with a district 0 (zero): BL, BS, CM, CR, FY, HA, PR, SL, SS (BS is the only area to have both a district 0 and a district 10)
6. Some central London single-digit districts have been further divided by inserting a letter after the digit and before the space: EC1–EC4, SW1, W1, WC1, WC2 and parts of E1 (E1W), N1 (N1C and N1P), NW1 (NW1W) and SE1 (SE1P).
7. The letters Q, V and X are not used in the first position of the outward code (except for special codes XX and XM)
8. The letters I, J and Z are not used in the second position of the outward code, except for three BOT postcodes: BIQQ 1ZZ (British Antarctic Territory), FIQQ 1ZZ (Falkland Islands), SIQQ (South Georgia and the South Sandwich Islands).
9. The only letters to appear in the third position, when the structure starts with A9A, are A, B, C, D, E, F, G, H, J, K, P, S, T, U and W.
10. The only letters to appear in the fourth position, when the structure starts with AA9A, are A, B, E, H, M, N, P, R, V, W, X and Y.
11. The postcode unit (the final two letters): letters C, I, K, M, O or V are not used, to avoid confusion with visually similar preceding digits or with each other when hand-written.
12. Postcode districts: maximum 100 per area, numbered from 0 to 99
13. Single digit postcode districts: numbered from 1 to 9, with 0 only used after 9 has been allocated, save for Croydon (see above).
14. Postcode districts 0 and 1 to 9 are not preceded by a leading 0 (as in 00 and 01 to 09), unlike the initial prototype postcode format.
15. Postcode sectors can also be one of ten digits: 0 to 9, though in some postcode areas the 0 is issued as the first in the sequence (for example in LE), while in other areas it is issued the end of the sequence (i.e. 10, as in CV).

A postcode can be validated against a table of all 1.7 million postcodes in Code-Point Open. The full delivery address including postcode can be validated against the PAF constituting most (but not all) addresses in the UK., by PAF licensed users.

A regular expression for validating UK postcodes is specified in the British Standards document BS 7666.

Postcodes can be individually checked, free of charge, on the Royal Mail's website.

== Special cases ==
=== Crown dependencies ===
The Channel Islands and the Isle of Man established their own postal administrations separate from the UK in 1969. Despite this, they adopted the UK-format postcodes in 1993–94: Guernsey using GY, the Isle of Man using IM, and Jersey using JE and administer them consistent with the administration practices of Royal Mail.

The independent jurisdiction of Sark was assigned a unique postcode district GY10 in 2011 to differentiate it from Alderney. The CEO of Guernsey Post, Boley Smillie, said "this has been a long time coming" and "... Sark should have had its own identity back then [when postcodes were adopted in 1993]".

=== British Overseas Territories ===
British Overseas Territories are generally responsible for their own postal systems, including postcodes. A number of BOTs have been independently introduced postcodes: Bermuda has developed its own postcode system, with unique postcodes for street and PO Box addresses, as have the Cayman Islands, Montserrat and the British Virgin Islands. A system has been under consideration in Gibraltar for some time, but not yet settled.

The postal code systems introduced independently by BOTs are shown below:

Postcode	Location
AI-2640	Anguilla
KYn-nnnn	Cayman Islands
MSR-nnnn	Montserrat
VG-nnnn	British Virgin Islands
aa nn or aa aa	Bermuda

For the remaining BOTs (including Gibraltar) postcodes have recently been introduced to address long-standing concerns. Mail was often misdirected and sent to the wrong place, e.g., to St Helena instead of St Helens, Merseyside or St Helens, Isle of Wight, to Asunción in Paraguay instead of Ascension Island, and to Edinburgh instead of Edinburgh of the Seven Seas, Tristan da Cunha, Many online companies would not accept addresses without a postcode and residents were accordingly being denied access to retail and other services.

Mail from the UK continues to be treated as international, not inland, and sufficient postage must be used.

The introduced postcodes broadly follow the structure of the UK postcode system (in that they contain two parts, each alphanumeric, and the second part in the format 9AA, with 1ZZ adopted for all BOTs except Gibraltar which adopted 1AA). In Gibraltar's case, the UK format has been fully adopted (and effectively creates a new postcode area GX).

Postcode	Location
ASCN 1ZZ	Ascension Island
BBND 1ZZ	British Indian Ocean Territory
BIQQ 1ZZ	British Antarctic Territory
FIQQ 1ZZ	Falkland Islands
GX11 1AA	Gibraltar
PCRN 1ZZ	Pitcairn Islands
SIQQ 1ZZ	South Georgia and the South Sandwich Islands
STHL 1ZZ	Saint Helena
TDCU 1ZZ	Tristan da Cunha
TKCA 1ZZ	Turks and Caicos Islands

The four-letter outward codes conflict with the UK's two letter outward codes in some respects:

- the use of I as the second letter (BIQQ, FIQQ, SIQQ), and
- duplication with existing postcode areas (BBND and BB Blackburn, STHL and ST Stoke-on-Trent, TDCU and TD Tweeddale).

=== British Sovereign Base Areas (Cyprus) ===
British Sovereign Base Areas of Akrotiri and Dhekelia in Cyprus use Cypriot postal codes for civilian use. The British military use BFPO addresses.

=== British Forces Post Office (BFPO) ===
The British Forces Post Office (BFPO) provides a postal service to HM Forces separate from that provided by Royal Mail in the United Kingdom, with BFPO addresses used for the delivery of mail in the UK and around the world. BFPO codes such as "BFPO 801" serve the same function as postal codes for civilian addresses, with the last line of the address consisting of "BFPO" followed a space and a number of 1 to 4 digits.

For consistency with the format of other UK addresses, in 2012 BFPO and Royal Mail jointly introduced an optional alternative postcode format for BFPO addresses, using the new non-geographic postcode area "BF" and the notional post town "BFPO". Each BFPO number is assigned to a postcode in the standard UK format, beginning "BF1". Inward codes are assigned as follows: 0 – Germany, 1 – UK, 2 – Rest of Europe, 3 – Rest of World, 4 – Ships and Naval Parties, 5 – Rest of World, Operations and Exercises, 6 – Rest of World, Operations and Exercises. The database was released commercially in March 2012 as part of the Royal Mail Postal Address File (PAF). A postcode is not required if the traditional "BFPO nnnn" format is used.

=== Non-geographic postcodes ===
==== Overview ====
The overwhelming majority of postcodes in the 121 postcode areas are "geographic", and provide routing instructions to a defined set of addresses.

Some postcodes (areas, districts, sectors and specific postcodes) are alternatively or additionally functional rather than purely operational. These are generally termed "non-geographic post codes". Non-geographic codes are used for both sorting, routing and applying specific customer-requested services. Most non-geographic postcodes are listed in the PAF, which indicates the "Out Date" (first issue), Large User recipient, special functions and services and the matching geographical (district or sector) for each non-geographic postcode.

"Non-geographic" postcodes may be allocated only to Large Users (by reason just of the mail volume) or for additional purposes many of which were introduced after or have significantly evolved since the introduction of the current post code system. These include: Admail, "bulk mail" or other large volumes (government and business), centralised opening and scanning of inward mail, competitions, parcel returns, direct marketing and PO boxes. These postcodes are also referred to as "business service indicator addresses".

Non-geographic postcodes cannot be used for identifying location, estimating distance or route finding in SatNav systems.

As with standard postcodes, non-geographic postcodes may be terminated as the business becomes defunct or services adapted or transferred transferred e.g. Jobcentre (as part of the Department for Work and Pensions) typically had the AA98 or AA99 district in many postcode areas but each office is now allocated a specific postcode in the WV98 and WV99 districts, with the physical mail for each local office delivered to the centralised location, and sorted according to individual office and DWP operational areas, and then subsequently routed to the local office in electronic format.). Some districts are dual purpose (they have both geographic and non-geographic postcodes). Separate sectors will be allocated to geographic addressees and non-geographic addresses.

Non-geographic postcodes include -

- Postcodes for PO boxes: PO Boxes are available to both Large Users and Small Users and consist of receipt/holding service (at a local Sorting/Delivery Centre), with collection by the user, or an additional delivery to the user at their business or home address.
- Postcode districts or sectors for Large Users: many geographic postcode areas also contain postcode districts that are "non-geographic" and are allocated to specific recipients which are institutions, government departments, commercial businesses or significant organizations (e.g. SA99 is allocated to the Driver and Vehicle Licensing Agency; postcodes in E98 are allocated to News International Ltd newspapers).
- Postcode area BF: BF is the postcode area for British Forces Post Office (BFPO) addresses and is entirely non-geographic (see above).
- Postcode area BX: BX is entirely non-geographic, with all its codes independent of the location of the recipient. BX addresses have no locations or post towns, only recipients.
- Postcode area XX: the XX postcode area is non-geographic and is allocated for parcel returns of large volume online retailers (and was used for medical sample testing during the COVID pandemic).

==== Numbering rules ====
For PO boxes outside London, postcode districts or sectors may be exclusively or jointly allocated for PO Boxes. In the Brighton BN postcode area, BN50-BN52 districts are allocated to PO Boxes in Brighton, Rottingdean and Hove. In Taunton, a separate post town is allocated within postcode district TN2 (TN2 Taunton for geographic addresses and TN2 Wadhurst for PO Box addresses). In St Andrews, Fife (KY16), sector KY16 6 is allocated exclusively for PO Boxes. The PAF contains a section "Current PO Boxes" that sets out for each postcode area its PO Box sectors, delivery office, post towns covered and geographic coverage.

For PO boxes in London, as well as the allocation in other areas, postcode districts ending in -P, such as SE1P, are usually allocated to PO Boxes. However, other letters are also used, and the use of -P is inconsistent, as it has been allocated to geographic addresses, such as SW1P.

For Large Users, there appear to be no binding rules publicly available for numbering of non-geographic districts, and therefore can be numbered anywhere in the range 0 to 99, but many such districts are allocated a number higher than the currently existing postcode districts and often in the range 90-99 (several government departments use the AA98 or AA99 district in a number of postcode areas) - retrieved from PAF file, List of postcode areas in the United Kingdom. This is possible in most postcode areas as only a very small number have allocated geographic districts in that number range (B90-B98, BT92-BT94, and M90 seem to be the only geographic districts in this range). However, there are many non-geographic districts numbered outside this range (e.g. American Express has the postcode district BN88; in Glasgow G58 is allocated to National Savings, as part of a mnemonic postcode G58 1SB, though it is located in G43 postcode district).

==== Significant recipients/addresses ====
Some postcodes in the "non-geographic" range 90–99 are in fact geographic, but specific to the institution or entity and not part of the surrounding numbering sequence (and thus quite different from the neighbouring properties): for example, EH99 1SP can be used with GPS mapping to locate and navigate to the Scottish Parliament (which is directly opposite the Palace of Holyroodhouse, EH8 8DX, and across the road from 7/4 Canongate, EH8 8BX).

The postcode district SW1A has many significant recipients that have been allocated distinctive post codes by Royal Mail, including the district's primary code, SW1A 1AA, allocated to Buckingham Palace, and SW1A 2AA, allocated to 10 Downing Street.

==== Royal Mail and Post Offices ====
There is no non-geographic postcode format or range for Royal Mail facilities or Post Offices. Postcodes ending 1AA were sometimes allocated to post offices (Crown, main and sub-) such as NR3 1AA for Magdalen Street post office in Norwich. The Royal Mail Head Office is EC1A 1AA. Some are terminated following disposal of former Post Office buildings (e.g. EH1 1AA in Edinburgh).

Postcodes ending nHQ

The letters HQ for the last two letters may also mean it is most likely a non-geographic postcode allocated to a Large User with additional services.

Postcodes ending nBR

The postcode printed on Business Reply envelopes (which do not require a stamp) often ends with the letters BR but is not an essential and defining feature not definitive of the BR service.

==== Postcode for letters to Father Christmas ====
There is also a special postcode for letters to Santa or Father Christmas, XM4 5HQ which is a semi-mnemonic rendition of XMAS HQ.

==== Terminated non-geographic codes ====
Girobank's headquarters in Bootle used the non-geographic postcode GIR 0AA.

==== Publication ====
Many non-geographic postcodes do not appear on Royal Mail's own online postcode finder tool or their Click and Drop online postage printing tool, which can add to confusion when responding to organisations that use such addresses. Likewise, delivery services or couriers other than Royal Mail may not be able to deliver to such non-physical addresses. The UK government provides for couriers alternative geographic addresses to their BX addresses.

==== Extent ====
Non-geographic postcode districts have been allocated in 63 of the 122 postcode areas (and also in two of three postcode areas of the Crown Dependencies).

Postcode Area	Non-geographic districts	Notes
AB	99	
B	99	
BA	9	
BB	0, 94	
BD	97, 98, 99	
BN	50, 51, 52, 88, 91, 95, 99	50-52 for PO Boxes
BS	0, 98, 99	
BT	58	
CA	95, 99	
CF	30, 91, 95, 99	
CH	25-34, 88, 99	25-34 for PO Boxes
CM	92, 98, 99	
CR	9, 44, 90	
CT	50	
CW	98	
DE	1, 45, 99	For DE1 and DE45, only sectors 0 and 9 respectively
DH	97, 98, 99	
DL	98	
DN	55	Royal Mail services
E	77, 98	
EC	1P, 2P, 3P, 4P, 50	1P to 4P for PO Boxes
EH	77, 91, 95, 99	
G	9, 58, 70, 79, 90	
GL	11	
GU	95	
HP	22	
IP	98	
IV	99	
KY	99	
L	67, 69, 70, 71, 72, 73, 74, 75, 80	69 for PO Boxes
LE	21, 41, 55, 87, 94, 95	
LS	88, 98, 99	99 for PO Boxes
M	60, 61, 99	
ME	99	
MK	77	
N	1P, 81	1P for PO Boxes
NE	82, 83, 85, 88, 92, 98, 99	99 for PO Boxes
NG	70, 80, 90	
NN	99	
NR	18, 19, 26, 99	NR18 appears to be both geographic and non-geographic
NW	1W, 26	26 for PO Boxes
OL	16, 95	
PE	99	
PL	95	
PO	24	
PR	0, 11	
RH	77	
S	49, 94, 95, 96, 97, 98, 99	
SA	48, 72, 80, 99	
SE	1P	PO Boxes
SR	9, 43	
SS	1	Post town Westcliff - PO Boxes
SY	99	
TN	2	Post town Wadhurst
TQ	9	
UB	3, 5, 8, 18	
W	1A	PO Boxes
WA	55, 88	
WD	99	
WF	90	
WR	11, 78, 99	WR11 post town Broadway
WV	1, 98, 99	WV1 post town Willenhall
YO	90	
JE	1, 4, 5	JE4 for PO Boxes
IM	86, 87, 99	Allocated to large users and PO Boxes

Notes:

1. Many of the non-geographic districts were formerly allocated to DWP (Department of Work and Pensions)/JobCentre, or predecessor agencies; mail delivery is now routed to DWP at WV98 and WV99 postcode districts.
2. This list reflects a publicly available section of the PAF that identifies non-geographic codes, dated July 2019. The list is subject to subsequent code termination, reallocation and additions. The PAF identifies: Out Date (date of issue), Non Geographic Code, Company (Organisation), Geographic Area. For example, for LS Leeds it includes "Feb 1994, LS98 Sector 1, First Direct Bank, LS11 Sector 0"
3. This list reflects a publicly available section of the PAF that identifies current (at time of publication) PO Box sectors, dated July 2019. The publication indicates that PAF is updated every six months in respect of PO Box sectors.

=== Special and customised postcodes ===
Royal Mail has sometimes assigned semi-mnemonic postcodes (sometimes based on the actual geographic postcode district) to high-profile organisations.

More recently, Royal Mail has advertised a limited form of postcode customisation, so as to make it unique and personal. A customised Postcode can only be issued in the UK for a brand new development or an organisation that already has a Large User Postcode. This form of customisation is limited to the last two characters (letters) of the postcode (the postcode unit).

Prominent examples (for both geographic and special case postcodes) issued from the introduction of the modern postcode scheme, and subsequently, are:

Postcode	Organisation
B1 1HQ	HSBC UK headquarters at 1 Centenary Square, Birmingham
~~BS98 1TL~~	TV Licensing (now changed to DL98 1TL)
BX1 1LT	Lloyds Bank formerly known as Lloyds TSB Bank—BX postcode area is non-geographic
BX2 1LB	Bank of Scotland (part of Lloyds Banking Group)—BX postcode area is non-geographic
BX3 2BB	Barclays Bank—BX postcode area is non-geographic
BX4 7SB	TSB Bank—BX postcode area is non-geographic
BX5 5AT	VAT Central Unit of HM Revenue and Customs (Roman numeral "VAT" = "5AT")—BX postcode area is non-geographic
CF10 1BH	Lloyds Banking Group (formerly Black Horse Finance)
CF99 1SN	Senedd (Welsh Parliament)
CO4 3SQ	University of Essex (Square 3)
CV4 8UW	University of Warwick
CV35 0DB	Aston Martin after their sports cars named "DB"
DA1 1RT	Dartford F.C. (nicknamed The Darts)
~~DE99 3GG~~	Egg Banking (decommissioned in February 2018, after the closure of the bank )
DE55 4SW	Slimming World
DH98 1BT	British Telecom
DH99 1NS	National Savings certificates administration
E14 5HQ	HSBC headquarters at 8 Canada Square, Canary Wharf
E14 5JP	JP Morgan (Bank Street)
E16 1XL	ExCeL London
E20 2AQ	Olympic Aquatics Centre
E20 2BB	Olympic Basketball Arena
E20 2ST	Olympic Stadium
E20 3BS	Olympic Broadcast Centre
E20 3EL	Olympic Velodrome
E20 3ET	Olympic Eton Manor Tennis Courts
E20 3HB	Olympic Handball Arena (now the Copper Box)
E20 3HY	Olympic Hockey Stadium
E98 1SN	The Sun newspaper
E98 1ST	The Sunday Times newspaper
E98 1TT	The Times newspaper
EC2N 2DB	Deutsche Bank
EC2Y 8HQ	Linklaters headquarters at One Silk Street
EC4Y 0HQ	Royal Mail Group Ltd headquarters
EC4Y 0JP	JP Morgan (Victoria Embankment)
EH12 1HQ	NatWest Group headquarters
EH99 1SP	Scottish Parliament (founded in 1999)
G58 1SB	National Savings Bank (the district number 58 also approximates the outline of the initials SB)
~~GIR 0AA~~	Girobank (now Santander Corporate Banking)
HA9 0WS	Wembley Stadium
~~HP5 1WA~~	Inland Waterways Association (decommissioned when the IWA moved office in April 2023)
IV21 2LR	Two Lochs Radio
L30 4GB	Girobank (alternative geographic postcode)
LS98 1FD	First Direct bank
M50 2BH	BBC Bridge House
M50 2QH	BBC Quay House
N1 9GU	The Guardian newspaper
N81 1ER	Electoral Reform Services
NE1 4ST	St James' Park Stadium, Newcastle United
NG80 1EH	Experian Embankment House
NG80 1LH	Experian Lambert House
NG80 1RH	Experian Riverleen House
NG80 1TH	Experian Talbot House
RM11 1QT	Queen's Theatre, Hornchurch
PH1 2SJ	St Johnstone Football Club
~~PH1 5RB~~	Royal Bank of Scotland Perth Chief Office (now closed)
S2 4SU	Sheffield United Football Club
S6 1SW	Sheffield Wednesday Football Club
S14 7UP	The World Snooker Championships at the Crucible Theatre, Sheffield; 147 UP refers to a maximum lead (from a maximum break) in snooker
S70 1GW	The Glass Works - retail and leisure centre in Barnsley town centre
SA99	Driver and Vehicle Licensing Agency—All postcodes starting with SA99 are for the DVLA offices in the Morriston area of Swansea. The final part of the postcode relates to the specific office or department within the DVLA.
SE1 0NE	One America Street, the London headquarters of architectural firm TP Bennett
SE1 8UJ	Union Jack Club
SM6 0HB	Homebase Limited
SN38 1NW	Nationwide Building Society
SR5 1SU	Stadium of Light, Sunderland AFC
SW1A 0AA	House of Commons (Palace of Westminster; see below for House of Lords)
SW1A 0PW	House of Lords (Palace of Westminster; see above for House of Commons)
SW1A 1AA	Buckingham Palace (the Monarch)
SW1A 2AA	10 Downing Street (the Prime Minister)
SW1A 2AB	11 Downing Street (Chancellor of the Exchequer)
SW1H 0TL	Transport for London (Windsor House, 50 Victoria Street)
SW1P 3EU	European Commission and European Parliament office (European Union)
SW1W 0DT	The Daily Telegraph newspaper
SW1V 1AP	Apollo Victoria Theatre
SW1X 1SP	High Commission of Singapore, London
SW11 7US	Embassy of the United States, London
SW19 5AE	All England Lawn Tennis and Croquet Club (Venue of the Wimbledon Championships)
TW8 9GS	GlaxoSmithKline
W1A 1AA	BBC Broadcasting House (independently notable postcode)
~~W1D 4FA~~	The former address of The Football Association (decommissioned in February 2010 after they moved location)
W1N 4DJ	BBC Radio 1 (disc jockey)
W1T 1FB	Facebook

== Operation ==
=== Sorting ===
Postcodes are used to sort letters to their destination either manually, where sorters use labelled frames, or increasingly with letter-coding systems, where machines assist in sorting. A variation of automated sorting uses optical character recognition (OCR) to read printed postcodes, best suited to mail that uses a standard layout and addressing format.

A long string of "faced" letters (i.e. turned to allow the address to be read) is presented to a keyboard operator at a coding desk, who types the postcodes onto the envelopes in coloured phosphor dots. The associated machine uses the outward codes in these dots to direct bundles of letters into the correct bags for specific delivery offices. With a machine knowledge of the specific addresses handled by each postal walk at each office, the bundles can be further sorted using the dots of the inward sorting code so that each delivery round receives only its own letters. This feature depends upon whether it is cost effective to second-sort outward letters, and tends to be used only at main sorting offices where high volumes are handled.

When postcodes are incomplete or missing, the operator reads the post town name and inserts a code sufficient for outward sorting to the post town, where others can further direct it. The mail bags of letter bundles are sent by road, air or train, and eventually by road to the delivery office. At the delivery office the mail that is handled manually is inward sorted to the postal walk that will deliver it; it is then "set in", i.e. sorted into the walk order that allows the deliverer the most convenient progress in the round. The latter process is now being automated, as the roll-out of walk sequencing machines continues.

==== Integrated Mail Processors ====
Integrated Mail Processors (IMPs) read the postcode on the item and translate it into two phosphorus barcodes representing the outward and inward parts of the postcode, which the machines subsequently print and read to sort the mail to the correct outward postcode. Letters may also be sequentially sorted by a Compact Sequence Sorter (CSS) reading the inward postcode in the order that a walking postman/woman will deliver, door to door. On such items the top phosphorous barcode is the inward part of the code, the bottom is the outward.

IMPs can also read RM4SCC items, as used in Cleanmail, a different format to the above.

==== Mailsort and Walksort ====
In 1989, a system of five-digit codes called Mailsort was designed for users who sent "a minimum of 4,000 letter-sized items", or 1,000 Large Letter sized items, in a single mailing. A variant called Presstream was available to mailers of magazines and periodicals. Mailsort encoded the outward part of the postcode in a way that was useful for mail routing, so that a particular range of Mailsort codes would go on a particular plane or lorry. Mailsort users were supplied with a database to allow them to convert from postcodes to Mailsort codes and receive a discount if they delivered mail to Royal Mail presorted by Mailsort code. Users providing outgoing mail sorted by postcode received no such incentive since postcode areas and districts are assigned using permanent mnemonics and do not therefore assist with grouping items together geographically or by any routing. Mailsort was discontinued in April 2012. Walksort was discontinued in May 2012.

== Allocation and Management ==
=== Statutory Framework ===
Under the Postal Services Act 2011, Ofcom (as the regulator of postal services) has appointed Royal Mail as the sole Universal Provider. This obliges Royal Mail to deliver mail (letters and packets) to the home or premises of every individual or other person in the United Kingdom, in accordance with seven prescribed minimum requirements (covering delivery; collection; uniform, affordable pricing; registered items; insured items; services for the blind/partially sighted; legislative petitions).

Under the Postal Services Act 2000, s.116 the Postcode Address File (PAF) is defined as the "...collection of postcodes in the United Kingdom which may be used to facilitate the identification of delivery points for the purpose of providing postal services." Royal Mail as the statutory owner of the PAF is obliged to both maintain the PAF in accordance with a Code of Practice supervised by Ofcom, and to make the PAF available to users on reasonable terms.

The PAF Code of Practice 2010 is currently in effect. The PAF Advisory Board was established in 2007 with a wide remit, including to give independent advice to the Address Management Unit of Royal Mail on behalf of PAF users.

=== Postcode Address File (PAF) ===
The Address Management Unit of Royal Mail therefore maintains the official database of UK postal addresses and postcodes in its Postcode Address File (PAF). PAF is updated daily.

On its website, Royal Mail publishes summary information about major changes to postcode sectors and postal localities (including post towns). Individual postcodes or postal addresses can be found using Royal Mail's Postcode and Address Finder website, but this is limited to 50 free searches per user per day.

The PAF is commercially licensable and is often incorporated in address management software packages. The capabilities of such packages allow most addresses to be constructed solely from the postcode and house number. By including the map references of postcodes in the address database, the postcode can be used to pinpoint a postcode area on a map.

=== Postcode Allocation ===
Postcodes are allocated by Royal Mail's Address Management Unit. In general, they cannot be purchased or specified by the recipient. The owner of the property covered by the address has no propriety right in the postcode. Allocation request for new streets are initiated by local authorities.

=== Changing postcodes ===
Royal Mail's approach to changing postcodes is formally set out in the PAF Code of Practice, May 2010, agreed between Royal Mail and the Postal Regulator (now Ofcom). Royal mails states that:

"Whenever possible we try not to change addresses and Postcodes. Changes are, however, sometimes necessary to ensure that mail is delivered as quickly and efficiently as possible. For example, occasionally we need to change the way we route mail to provide a better service if a new delivery office is built, and sometimes we run out of Postcodes to allocate to new homes and businesses in a developing area. It is also possible for a local council to prompt a change by re-numbering buildings or re-naming roads.

"In any of the above circumstances, we may need to change existing Postcodes or addresses to ensure that mail is handled efficiently and delivered without delay. If we have to recode as a result of running out of Postcodes for a particular area, Royal Mail will notify addressees of any change following the process set out in Section Three. This process will also be followed when changes are made for other Royal Mail operational or efficiency purposes."

There are several groups, mostly on the fringes of major population centres, who are affected in one way or another by the associations of their postcode. There is a movement in the Royal Borough of Windsor and Maidenhead to change the first two characters of their postcodes from SL to WM for vanity, so as not to be associated with Slough. A businessman in Ilford wishes to have the postcode district of IG1 changed to E19 as he claims customers do not realise his business is based in Greater London.

Some residents of West Heath in SE2 asked to have their postcodes changed to that of adjacent Bexleyheath, citing higher insurance premiums as reason to change. Some residents of Kingston Vale in SW15 wish to have their postcodes changed to adjacent Kingston upon Thames for the same reasons.

In all these cases Royal Mail has said that there is "virtually no hope" of changing the postcode, referring to their policy of changing postcodes only to match changes in their operations. Under this policy residents of the Wirral Peninsula had their postcodes changed from the L (Liverpool) to CH (Chester) group when a new sorting office was opened.

=== Postcodes in numbers ===
There are approximately 1.7 million postcodes in the United Kingdom, the Channel Islands and the Isle of Man.

As of June 2016, there are 124 postcode areas, 2,987 postcode districts, 11,192 postcode sectors, and 1,500 post towns. As of January 2021, 55,540 full postcodes in England and Wales contain only one household. Addresses receiving large volumes of mail are each assigned separate "large user" postcodes. But most postcodes are shared by several neighbouring properties, typically covering about 15 addresses.

=== Life-cycle of postcodes ===
There are also significant numbers of discontinued (terminated) codes. Each month some 2,750 postcodes are created and 2,500 terminated.

Component	Part	Example	Live codes	Terminated codes	Other codes	Total
Postcode area	Out code	YO	124	0	3	127
Postcode district	Out code	YO31	2,984	103	4	3,087
Postcode sector	In code	YO31 1	11,197	1,071	4	12,272
Postcode unit	In code	YO31 1EB	1,767,416	876,312	4	2,643,732
Postcode Addresses			Approx. 29,965,962			

== Postcode Data - Licensing and Usage ==
=== Code-Point Open ===
Prior to 1 April 2010, the Royal Mail licensed use of the postcode database for a charge of about £4,000 per year. Following a campaign and a government consultation in 2009, the Ordnance Survey released Code-Point Open, detailing each current postcode in Great Britain together with a geo-code for re-use free of charge under an attribution-only licence (Open Government Licence as part of OS OpenData).

Under the government's OS OpenData initiative, it is available for re-use without charge under an attribution-only licence. The Code-Point Open list includes median coordinates for each postcode but excludes postcodes in Northern Ireland and the Crown dependencies. Unlike the PAF products provided by Royal Mail, the Code-Point Open list does not include postal address text.

=== ONS Postcode Directory and National Statistics Postcode Lookup ===
The Office for National Statistics (ONS Geography) also maintains and publishes a series of freely available, downloadable postcode products that link all current and terminated UK postcodes to a range of administrative, health, statistical and other geographies using the Code-Point Open grid reference, under similar licence terms to the OS product. Both the ONSPD and NSPL contain Northern Ireland postcodes, with centroid coordinates in the OSI grid as opposed to the OSGB grid, although Northern Ireland postcodes are subject to a more restrictive licence permitting internal business use only.

Postcodes for the Crown Dependencies are also included, without co-ordinates. A further difference is that non-current postcodes and dates of introduction and withdrawal of postcodes are included.

== Other uses of postcodes ==
While postcodes were introduced to expedite the delivery of mail, they are useful tools for other purposes, particularly because codes are very fine-grained and identify just a few addresses. Among these uses are:

- With satellite navigation systems, to navigate to an address by street number and postcode
- By life insurance companies and pension funds to assess longevity for pricing and reserving
- By other types of insurance companies to assess premiums for motoring/business/domestic policies
- To determine catchment areas for school places or doctors' surgeries
- Finding the nearest branch of an organisation to a given address. A computer program uses the postcodes of the target address and the branches to list the closest branches in order of distance as the crow flies (or, if used in conjunction with street-map software, by road distance). This can be used by companies to inform potential customers where to go, by jobcentres to find jobs for job-seekers, to alert people of town planning applications in their area, and a great many other applications.

== References in media and in culture ==
The phrase "postcode lottery" refers to the variation in the availability of services by region, though not always because of postcodes.

For these and related reasons, postcodes in some areas have become indicators of social status. Some residents have campaigned to change their postcode to associate themselves with a more desirable area, to disassociate with a poorer area, to reduce insurance premiums or to be associated with an area with a lower cost of living. In all these cases Royal Mail has said that there is "virtually no hope" of changing the postcode, referring to their policy of changing postcodes only to match changes in their operations.

In 2008, the ska band Madness released a single called "NW5", named after the postal district of the same name. In 2012, the British author Zadie Smith released a book called NW, named after the postal district of the same name, where the novel is set. The novel was adapted into a 2016 television film by the BBC.

== See also ==
- List of postcode areas in the United Kingdom
- List of postal codes (around the world)
- ACORN
- Address Point
- Postcode lottery
- RM4SCC—a machine-readable barcode version of the postcode and delivery point suffix
- Postcode Address File
- Unique Property Reference Number
