= NSAI =

NSAI may refer to:

- Nashville Songwriters Association International, songwriting preservation and education society
- National Spatial Address Infrastructure, a United Kingdom government initiative
- National Standards Authority of Ireland, the ISO member body for the Republic of Ireland
- Nonsteroidal anti-inflammatory drug, a group of analgesic drugs
- Nonsteroidal aromatase inhibitor, a class of drugs used in treatment of breast cancer
