= OS MasterMap =

Database of topography

The OS MasterMap is the premier digital product of the Ordnance Survey. It was launched in November 2001. It is a database that records every fixed feature of Great Britain larger than a few meters in one continuous digital map. Every feature is given a unique TOID (TOpographical IDentifier), a simple identifier that includes no semantic information. Typically each TOID is associated with a polygon that represents the area on the ground that the feature covers, in National Grid coordinates. OS MasterMap is offered in themed "layers", for example a road layer and a building layer, each linked to a number of TOIDs. Pricing of licenses for OS MasterMap data depends on: the total area requested, the layers licensed, the number of TOIDs in the layers, the period in years of the data usage.

OS MasterMap can be used to generate maps for a vast array of purposes. Although the scale on a digital map is much more flexible than a paper map, one can print out maps from OS MasterMap data with detail equivalent to a traditional 1:1250 paper map.

Ordnance Survey claims that OS MasterMap data is never more than six months out of date, thanks to continuous review. The scale and detail of this mapping project is so far unique. Around 440 million TOIDs have so far been assigned, and the database stands at 600 terabytes in size.

== Layers ==
=== Topography Layer ===
The OS MasterMap Topography Layer represents topography at a scale of 1:1250. It is further subdivided into a number of themes: land area classifications' buildings, roads, tracks and paths, rail, water, terrain and height, heritage and antiquities, structures; and administrative boundaries.

=== Integrated Transport Network Layer ===
OS MasterMap® Integrated Transport Network™ (ITN) Layer maps Great Britain’s road network – from motorways, pedestrian streets, parks, reserves to museums. It contains attributes to enable the routing of vehicles, taking into account the limitations of the road network in general.

=== OS MasterMap Address Layer 2 ===
OS MasterMap Address Layer 2 is a dataset that describes the location of addresses. It is designed to be used as a means of geo-referencing addresses and attempts to improve on Address Point. Address Layer is a part of the National Spatial Address Infrastructure and contains National Land and Property Gazetteer attributes that classify properties. It is currently at the center of a dispute between Ordnance Survey and Intelligent Addressing, the custodian of the National Land and Property Gazetteer dataset.

=== Imagery Layer ===
The Imagery layer is a national collection of 25 cm resolution aerial photos.

== Delivery of the geographical data ==
OS MasterMap's data is in GML format. It is usually delivered as files compressed with gzip (providing them an extension ".gz").

Recently, Ordnance Survey has been trialing delivery of OS MasterMap data using WFS and WMS, in accordance with the Open Geospatial Consortium. This trial may even end up with automatic updates using WFS-T.

== Custodianship of the data ==
Although branded like a commercial product, OS MasterMap, is in fact the UK’s most complete, accurate and up-to-date geographic record. By moving to purely digital media for mapping, Ordnance Survey brings upon itself the responsibility of being the sole mandatory custodian of Great Britain's official maps. Previously, by virtue of being a publication on paper, a copy of every edition of every paper map published by Ordnance Survey would have been deposited by law, with each of the six legal deposit libraries in the UK. Although there is no such law in place for digital maps, the Ordnance Survey makes annual 'snapshots' of the data and voluntarily deposits with the legal deposit libraries:

If you are not a licensee and wish to view and undertake limited copying of historic versions of OS MasterMap data, then you may do so at one of the six Legal Deposit Libraries that hold annual 'snapshots' of large-scale Ordnance Survey data, which Ordnance Survey voluntarily deposits by Agreement with these Libraries. The data may only be accessed within the premises of one of these Libraries, and views and prints made from the data may only be used for purposes included within the exceptions to the Copyright Designs and Patents Act 1988.

— Ordnance Survey website (Feb 2009)

The data, like any other, is susceptible to all the problems of computer data storage and digital preservation, for example: data corruption; the question of how often to take snapshots of the data (i.e. should every edit be recorded?); access to old versions of the data; practicable access to old versions of the data (after format changes, will new software be able to read old data?).
