= TOID =

Identifier of topographical features in Great Britain

A TOID (for "TOpographic IDentifier", pronounced toyed) is a unique identifier assigned by the Ordnance Survey to identify every topographical feature in Great Britain.

== Topographical identifier ==
A TOID consists of two parts: a prefix ‘osgb’, and a unique identifier that is 13-16 digits long. For example, the TOID for the Tower of London is osgb1000006032892. In GML 2, a TOID is encoded as a gml:fid (Feature Identifier); in GML 3 as a gml:id.

Around 440 million man-made and natural features have been thus identified: buildings, roads, fields, phone boxes, pillar boxes, landmarks and many other types. The identification system is designed to be used in GIS, digital cartography and in any customized computer application, including non-cartographic ones, where information about fixed, real-world features needs to be managed. Using consistent identifiers (IDs) makes it much easier to share data between various kinds of applications and systems. A TOID remains constant throughout the lifetime of the real-world feature it identifies, and is guaranteed not to be reassigned to anything else when the feature no longer exists.

In OS MasterMap, Ordnance Survey's master database, every feature is identified by a TOID. Other attributes of the feature are defined by relating them, via GML, to the TOID. Users of OS MasterMap relate their own data to TOIDs of the relevant items. This allows organisations to share data easily and cheaply since TOIDs are maintained centrally by Ordnance Survey, and are free to reuse.

=== Granularity of TOIDs ===
Every object in OS MasterMap has its own TOID, including features representing buildings, roads, addresses, and cartographic text. Complex entities such as Southampton Central railway station, are defined in terms of multiple TOIDs: one for the main building, several others for the platforms, and another for the pedestrian bridge over the tracks. The OS MasterMap Sites Layer has a single TOID for these 'sites'. Similarly, users can create their own "superTOID" that unites features into one entity. This also acknowledges that defining the boundaries of vaguely defined folk objects is subjective: should the station car-park be defined as part of the station, for example? The TOID scheme leaves such decisions to its users, that is, those building information systems for end-users.

=== TOID revision history ===
If the data for a feature is edited, for example to reflect a real-life change or to correct an error, then the changes are referenced by TOID. Unless the feature has undergone drastic change, the feature keeps its original TOID, enabling one to track changes to a feature over time if one has access to the historic data.

=== Intellectual property ===
In keeping with other OS open data initiatives, Ordnance Survey has a policy on royalty-free use of the TOID with the aim of allowing easier integration of data using its spatial database: a core part of its vision of a Digital National Framework.

"TOID" is a registered trademark of Ordnance Survey.

== See also ==
- Unique Property Reference Number (UPRN)
- Unique Street Reference Number (USRN)
