= GSS coding system =

Geocodes maintained by the United Kingdom's Office for National Statistics

GSS codes are nine-character geocodes maintained by the United Kingdom's Office for National Statistics (ONS) to represent a wide range of geographical areas of the UK, for use in tabulating census and other statistical data. GSS refers to the Government Statistical Service of which ONS is part.

GSS codes replaced a previous system called ONS codes from January 2011. ONS codes were hierarchical whereas in GSS codes there is no relation between the code for a lower-tier area and the corresponding parent area.

== Code formulation ==
GSS codes have a fixed length code of nine characters. The first three characters indicate the level of geography, and the six digits following define the individual unit. For example, the Royal Borough of Greenwich is coded as E09000011, Middlesbrough is E06000002, Cambridge E07000008 and Fenland E07000010.

As of December 2022, the meanings of some common three character prefixes are as follows:

| England | Wales | Scotland | Northern Ireland | Other | Status | Entity |
|---|---|---|---|---|---|---|
| E00 | W00 | S00 | N00 | - | Current | Census Output Area (OA); Small Areas (N) |
| E01 | W01 | S01 | – | - | Current | Lower layer Super Output Area (LSOA); Data Zone (S) |
| E02 | W02 | S02 | – | - | Current | Middle layer Super Output Area (MSOA); Intermediate Zone (S) |
| E04 | W04 | S35 | – | - | Current | Civil Parish (E/S); Community (W) |
| E05 | W05 | S13 | N08 | - | Current | Ward or Electoral Division |
| E06 | W06 | S12 | – | - | Current | Unitary Authority |
| E07 | – | – | – | - | Current | Non-Metropolitan District (two-tier) |
| E08 | – | – | – | - | Current | Metropolitan Borough |
| E09 | – | – | – | - | Current | London Borough |
| E10 | – | – | – | - | Current | County |
| E11 | – | – | – | - | Current | Metropolitan County |
| E12 | – | – | – | - | Current | English Region |
| E13 | – | – | – | - | Current | Inner and Outer London |
| E14 | W07 | S14 | N06 | - | Current | Westminster Parliamentary Constituency |
| E15 | W08 | S15 | N07 | - | Current | European Electoral Region |
| E16 | - | - | - | - | Archived | Primary Care Trusts |
| E17 | - | - | - | - | Archived | Care Trusts |
| E18 | - | - | - | L00 / M00 | Archived | Strategic Health Authorities |
| E19 | - | - | - | - | Archived | Pan Strategic Health Authorities |
| E20 | W12 | - | - | - | Current | Cancer Registries |
| E21 | W13 | - | - | - | Archived | Cancer Networks |
| E22 | W14 | - | - | - | Current | Community Safety Partnerships |
| E23 | W15 | S23 | N23 | - | Current | Police Force Areas |
| E24 | - | - | - | - | Archived | Local Learning and Skills Councils |
| E25 | - | - | - | - | Current | Primary Urban Areas |
| E26 | W18 | S21 | - | - | Current | National Parks |
| E27 | - | - | - | - | Archived | New Deal for Communities |
| E28 | W20 | - | - | - | Current | Registration Districts |
| E29 | W21 | - | - | - | Current | Registration Sub-District |
| E30 | W22 | S22 | N12 | K01 | Current | Travel to Work Areas |
| E31 | W25 | S38 | N31 | - | Current | Fire and Rescue Authorities |
| E32 | W09 | S16 | – | - | Current | London Assembly; Welsh Assembly; Scottish Parliament Constituency |
| E33 | W35 | S34 | N19 | - | Current | Workplace Zones |
| E34 | W37 | - | - | K05 | Archived | 2011 Built Up Areas |
| E35 | W38 | - | - | K06 | Archived | 2011 Built Up Area Sub-Divisions |
| E36 | W39 | - | - | - | Current | Census Merged Wards |
| E37 | - | - | - | - | Current | Local Enterprise Partnerships |
| E38 | - | - | - | - | Current | Clinical Commissioning Groups |
| E39 | - | - | - | - | Archived | NHS England |
| E40 | - | - | - | - | Current | NHS England Regions |
| E41 | W40 | - | - | - | Current | Merged Local Authority Districts |
| E42 | - | - | - | - | Current | Census Merged Counties |
| E43 | - | - | - | - | Current | Non-Civil Parished Areas |
| E45 | - | - | - | - | Current | Public Health England Centres |
| E46 | - | - | - | - | Current | Public Health England Regions |
| E47 | - | - | - | - | Current | Combined Authorities |
| E48 | - | - | - | - | Current | Local Resilience Forums |
| E49 | - | - | - | - | Current | Enterprise Zones |
| E50 | - | - | - | - | Current | Waste Authorities |
| E51 | - | - | - | - | Current | Development Corporations |
| E52 | - | - | - | - | Current | LEP - overlapping part |
| E53 | - | - | - | - | Current | LEP - non overlapping part |
| E54 | - | - | - | - | Current | Integrated care boards (formerly Sustainability and Transformation Partnerships) |
| E55 | - | - | - | - | Current | Strategic Clinical Networks |
| E56 | - | - | - | - | Current | Cancer Alliances |
| E57 | - | - | - | - | Archived | National Cancer Vanguards |
| E58 | - | - | - | - | Current | County Electoral Divisions |
| E59 | - | - | - | - | Current | Integrated Care Systems |
| E60 | W43 | S44 | N13 | - | Current | Local Planning Authorities |
| E61 | - | - | - | - | Current | Greater London Authority |
| E63 | W45 | S45 | | K08 | Current | 2022 Built Up Areas |
| E92 | W92 | S92 | N92 | L93 / M83 | Current | Country |
| E92 | W92 | S92 | N92 | - | Current | Country |
| - | - | - | - | J01 | Current | Major Towns and Cities |
| - | - | - | - | J02 | Current | 1961 Census Parishes |
| - | - | - | - | J03 | Current | 1961 Census Wards |
| - | - | - | - | J04 | Current | 1961 Census Districts |
| - | - | - | - | J05 | Current | 1961 Census Counties |
| - | - | - | - | K02 | Current | United Kingdom |
| - | - | - | - | K03 | Current | Great Britain |
| - | - | - | - | K04 | Current | England and Wales |
| - | - | - | - | L93 / M83 | Current | British Crown Dependencies |
| - | - | - | - | M01 | Current | Primary Healthcare Directorate |
| - | - | - | N09 | - | Current | Local Government Districts |
| - | - | - | N10 | - | Current | District Election Areas |
| - | - | - | N11 | - | Current | Settlement 2015 |
| - | - | - | N24 | - | Current | Police Force Districts |
| - | - | - | N32 | - | Current | Northern Ireland Fire and Rescue Service Areas |
| - | - | - | N33 | - | Current | Northern Ireland Fire and Rescue Service Districts |
| - | - | - | N34 | - | Current | City Regions |
| - | - | S03 | - | - | Archived | Community Health Partnerships |
| - | - | S04 | - | - | Current | Regeneration Outcome Agreement Areas - Scotland |
| - | - | S05 | - | - | Current | Regeneration Outcome Areas - Community Planning Partnerships |
| - | - | S06 | - | - | Current | Regeneration Outcome Areas - Local Areas |
| - | - | S07 | - | - | Current | Regional Transport Partnerships |
| - | - | S08 | - | - | Current | Health Board areas |
| - | - | S09 | - | - | Current | Enterprise Regions |
| - | - | S10 | - | - | Current | Urban Regeneration Companies |
| - | - | S11 | - | - | Current | Strategic Development Plan Areas |
| - | - | S12 | - | - | Current | Council Areas |
| – | W10 | S17 | – | - | Current | Welsh Assembly; Scottish Parliament Electoral Region |
| - | - | S19 | - | - | Current | Localities |
| - | - | S20 | - | - | Current | Settlements |
| - | - | S24 | - | - | Current | Highlands and Islands Enterprise |
| - | - | S25 | - | - | Current | Community Justice Authorities |
| - | - | S26 | - | - | Archived | Community Health Partnerships sub-areas |
| - | - | S27 | - | - | Current | ISD Health Board of Treatment |
| - | - | S28 | - | - | Current | Census Detailed Characteristics |
| - | - | S29 | - | - | Current | Census Local Characteristics |
| - | - | S30 | - | - | Current | Local Administrative Units 1 |
| - | - | S31 | - | - | Current | Local Administrative Units 2 |
| - | - | S32 | - | - | Current | Scottish Police Divisions |
| - | - | S33 | - | - | Current | Broad Rental Market Areas |
| - | - | S35 | - | - | Current | Civil Parish |
| - | - | S36 | - | - | Current | Island Groups |
| - | - | S37 | - | - | Current | Integration Authorities |
| - | - | S39 | - | - | Current | Scottish Fire and Rescue Local Senior Officer Areas |
| - | - | S40 | - | - | Current | Scottish Fire and Rescue Service Delivery Areas |
| - | - | S41 | - | - | Current | Scottish Marine Regions |
| - | - | S42 | - | - | Current | Scottish Local Resilience Partnerships |
| - | - | S43 | - | - | Current | Scottish Regional Resilience Partnerships |
| - | W03 | - | – | - | Current | Upper layer Super Output Area (USOA) |
| - | W04 | - | – | - | Current | Communities |
| - | W11 | - | – | - | Current | Local Health Boards |
| - | W16 | - | – | - | Current | Department for Children, Education, Lifelong Learning and Skills |
| - | W19 | - | – | - | Current | National Assembly Economic Regions |
| - | W23 | - | – | - | Current | Spatial Plan Areas |
| - | W24 | - | – | - | Current | Spatial Plan Sub-areas |
| - | W26 | - | – | - | Current | Strategic Regeneration Areas |
| - | W27 | - | – | - | Current | Strategic Regeneration Sub-areas |
| - | W28 | - | – | - | Current | Transport Consortia Areas |
| - | W29 | - | – | - | Current | Agricultural Regions |
| - | W30 | - | – | - | Current | Agricultural Small Areas |
| - | W31 | - | – | - | Current | Non-National Park Area |
| - | W32 | - | – | - | Current | Non-Strategic Regeneration Area |
| - | W33 | - | – | - | Current | Communities First Areas |
| - | W34 | - | – | - | Current | Non-Communities First Areas |
| - | W36 | - | – | - | Current | Footprint Regions for Public Service Collaboration |
| - | W42 | - | – | - | Current | City Regions |

In 2019, the House of Commons Library proposed names instead of numeric codes for MSOAs to make them easier to use. In 2021 the library created names for MSOAs for use within the house.

A full listing of GSS names and codes may be found by following the link to ONS Geography's Code History Database, below.

== Geography of the UK Census ==
Information from the 2011 Census is published for a wide variety of geographical units. These areas include:

- Counties in England
- Districts within English counties, and unitary authority areas (where one council provides district and county functions)
- Unitary council areas in Wales, Scotland, and Northern Ireland
- Civil parishes (communities in Wales)
- Electoral wards (electoral divisions in Wales). These areas are defined for the election of local councillors, but are also widely used for presenting statistics at a smaller scale than the whole district.
- Census output areas (OA), the smallest unit for which census data are published. They were initially generated to support publication of 2001 Census outputs and contain at least 40 households and 100 persons, the target size being 125 households. They were built up from postcode blocks after the census data were available, with the intention of standardising population sizes, geographical shape and social homogeneity (in terms of dwelling types and housing tenure). The OAs generated in 2001 were retained as far as possible for the publication of outputs from the 2011 Census (less than 3% were changed). Before 2001, census data was published for larger Enumeration Districts (ED) which were delineated before the census was conducted and were the organisational units for census data collection.

== Neighbourhood Statistics Geography ==
Super Output Areas (SOAs) are a set of geographical areas developed following the 2001 Census, initially to facilitate the calculation of the Indices of Deprivation 2004 and subsequently for a range of additional Neighbourhood Statistics (NeSS). The aim was to produce a set of areas of consistent size, whose boundaries would not change (unlike electoral wards), suitable for the publication of data such as the Indices of Deprivation. They are an aggregation of adjacent Output Areas with similar social characteristics. Lower Layer Super Output Areas (LSOAs) typically contain 4 to 6 OAs with a population of around 1,500. Middle Layer Super Output Areas (MSOAs) on average have a population of 7,200. The hierarchy of Output Areas and the two tiers of Super Output Areas have become known as the Neighbourhood Statistics Geography.

MSOAs use the name of the local or unitary authority followed by three digits, for example "Tower Hamlets 022" which is E02000885. LSOAs use the name of the containing MSOA followed by a letter, for example "Tower Hamlets 022C" which is E01004304.

Some LSOAs and MSOAs were revised in alignment with the 2021 Census.

== Former hierarchical coding system ==
The older ONS code was constructed top down:

- A two-character code represented a county.

For example, 12 for Cambridgeshire.

- A four-character code represented a district, so that the first two characters showed the county in which the district was placed.

For example, 12UB for Cambridge district or 12UD for Fenland.

- In the case of a unitary authority (including metropolitan and London boroughs) the first two digits were 00.

For example, 00AL for Greenwich (London Borough) or 00EC for Middlesbrough.

- Local Government wards were given a two-letter code within their local authority.

For example, 12UBGA for Petersfield Ward within Cambridge district.

- The smallest level, Census OAs were originally given an additional 4 digits within a ward, so that the first output area in Petersfield Ward was coded 12UBGA0001.
- Civil parishes were also coded using this hierarchical system. Parishes were coded using an additional 3 digits after their local authority. For example, within 12UD for Fenland district, the parish of Tydd St. Giles was coded 12UD010.

== See also ==
- Geodemographic segmentation
- ONS Open Geography Portal
