= National Spatial Address Infrastructure =

Proposed database of all United Kingdom addresses

The National Spatial Address Infrastructure (NSAI) was a database proposed by the UK Office of the Deputy Prime Minister (ODPM) on 26 May 2005 with the intention of creating a single repository of addresses for the UK. The proposal encountered numerous objections, particularly from local authorities who argued that such a repository already existed in the form of the National Land and Property Gazetteer (NLPG). Currently proposals for the NSAI have been suspended.

Originally the NSAI was proposed as a partnership between the Improvement and Development Agency (IDeA) and the Ordnance Survey. As part of this process the IDeA was expected to transfer ownership of the NLPG to Ordnance Survey. However, UK local authorities, who are the creators of all addresses in the UK and are collective owners of the NLPG, expressed great alarm. This was especially emphasised by the proposal that Ordnance Survey would effectively sell back to local authorities their own data. There were also grave concerns regarding Ordnance Survey's ability or suitability to undertake such a project. Indeed, the public statement by the ODPM summarising the responses to the short consultation period stated:

"Whilst the Prospectus indicated that the new arrangements should be seen as being partnership based, many local authority respondents commented adversely on OS as key partners within the programme. Generally the comments indicated that local authorities did not believe that OS was suitably qualified for the role it was to perform within NSAI. The criticisms covered both capability and capacity for work on address management, pointing out the key differences between work in this area and OS’s acknowledged skills in mapping. Some responses argued that OS’s previous track record in issues relating to address management (in areas such as the NSG) had not been satisfactory. Many authorities referred to OS’s existing address product (Address-Point) and commented that it was inaccurate, not maintained in a timely way, and didn’t contain the breadth of data contained in NLPG. Some authorities questioned OS’s willingness to act as a partner to local authorities. In contrast several LAs commented favourably on the performance of Intelligent Addressing as their existing service partner".

The Association for Geographic Information (AGI) also had reservations at the time.

On 3 December 2010, the Secretary of State for Communities and Local Government announced the formation of GeoPlace to provide a freely-available National Address Gazetteer. This is a joint venture between the Local Government Association (LGA) and Ordnance Survey which included the acquisition of Intelligent Addressing, the company that initially envisioned and coordinated the development of the NLPG.

Following the setting up of GeoPlace, NLPG data has been brought together with Ordnance Survey, Valuation Office Agency and Royal Mail data into the National Address Gazetteer infrastructure. The National Address Gazetteer infrastructure is the single source from which the AddressBase products from Ordnance Survey are developed. Through agreement between Ordnance Survey and Scotland’s Improvement Service, working on behalf of Scottish Local Government, the National Address Gazetteer includes Scottish address data.
