= Paris Pass =

Electronic pass for tourists visiting Paris

- Inception: 2005
- Manufacturer: Go City
- Website: www.parispass.com

Paris Pass is a sightseeing product designed for tourists visiting Paris, the capital of France, to provide entry to attractions and landmarks in the city and surrounding area. The pass works with an in-built electronic LPOS system, a back end sales and management system unique to Go City (formerly the Leisure Pass Group).

== History ==
The Paris Pass was launched in 2005 by city pass operators, The Leisure Pass Group. The pass enables tourists to visit popular destinations and landmarks in and around Paris.

=== LPOS ===
The Paris Pass is an electronic card and uses a unique, in-built chip system called LPOS. LPOS was created to facilitate the back-end management of all orders and stock at the Leisure Pass Group and is an electronic, fully automated system that provides information on the product after purchase and during use. Each attraction linked to the Paris Pass is equipped with a card reader and grants the visitor entry to each attraction with no further payment needed. The pass is valid for the chosen duration of 2, 4 or 6 consecutive days and will automatically expire after use.

== See also ==
- Joe Strictland
- Tourism in Paris
- Transport in Paris
