= ONS Postcode Directory =

The ONS Postcode Directory (ONSPD) relates both current and terminated postcodes in the United Kingdom to a range of current statutory administrative, electoral, health and other area geographies. It also links postcodes to pre-2002 health areas, 1991 Census enumeration districts for England and Wales, 2001 Census Output Areas (OA) and Super Output Areas (SOA) for England and Wales, 2001 Census OAs and SOAs for Northern Ireland and 2001 Census OAs and Data Zones (DZ) for Scotland. It helps support the production of area based statistics from postcoded data.

The ONSPD is produced by ONS Geography, who provide geographic support to the Office for National Statistics (ONS) and geographic services used by other organisations. The ONSPD is issued quarterly. The ONSPD is available for free download in comma separated variable (CSV) format and ASCII text (TXT) formats from the ONS Open Geography Portal. The supplied file contains multi CSVs so that postcode areas can be opened in MS Excel.

The ONSPD reflects current and terminated postcodes using information supplied monthly by Royal Mail. It relates postcodes (as at the third Friday of the month prior to each release) to administrative and electoral areas as at the preceding May and to the latest known health areas. The area assignments for postcodes in Scotland are to the latest electoral wards and council areas. The area assignments for postcodes in Northern Ireland are to the latest electoral wards and district council areas. The ONSPD uses the Government Statistical Service (GSS) standard 9-character codes throughout and lookup files linking these codes to statutory area names are provided.

Each record in the ONSPD contains the following fields:

- Unit postcode – 7 character version
- Unit postcode – 8 character version
- Unit postcode – variable length version
- Date of introduction
- Date of termination
- Non-metropolitan county
- County Electoral Division
- Local Authority District (LAD) / unitary authority (UA) / metropolitan district (MD) / London borough (LB) / (Scottish) council area (CA)
- Electoral ward / division
- Parish / community
- Postcode user type (small / large)
- National Grid reference – Easting
- National Grid reference – Northing
- Grid reference positional quality indicator (1–9)
- Former strategic health authority (SHA) – England / local health board (LHB) – Wales / health board (HB) – Scotland / Health authority (HA) – Channels Islands – Isle of Man / Health and Social Care Board (HSCB) – Northern Ireland
- NHS England (Region) (NHS ER)
- Country
- Region (former GOR)
- (Former) standard statistical region (SSR)
- Westminster parliamentary constituency
- European electoral region (EER)
- Local Learning and Skills Council (LLSC) – England / Dept. of Children, Education, Lifelong Learning and Skills (DCELLS) – Wales / Enterprise Region (ER) – Scotland
- Travel to work area (TTWA)
- Primary care trust (PCT) / care trust / Care Trust Plus (CT) / local health board (LHB) – Wales / Community Health Partnership (CHP) – Scotland / local commissioning group (LCG) – Northern Ireland / Primary Healthcare Directorate (PHD) – Isle of Man
- International Territorial Level (ITL) / LAU1
- 2005 ‘statistical’ ward (England and Wales only)
- 2001 Census Output Area (OA)
- Census Area Statistics (CAS) ward
- National park
- 2001 Census Lower Layer Super Output Area (LSOA) / Data Zone (DZ) / Super Output Area (SOA)
- 2001 Census Middle Layer Super Output Area (MSOA) / Intermediate Zone (IZ)
- 2001 Census urban/rural indicator
- 2001 Census Output Area classification (OAC)
- 2011 Census Output Area (OA) / Small Area (SA)
- 2011 Census Lower Layer Super Output Area (LSOA) / Data Zone (DZ) / SOA
- 2011 Census Middle Layer Super Output Area (MSOA) / Intermediate Zone (IZ)
- 2011 Census Workplace Zone (WZ)
- Clinical commissioning group (CCG) – England / local health board (LHB) – Wales / Community Health Partnership (CHP) – Scotland / local commissioning group (LCG) – Northern Ireland / Primary Healthcare Directorate (PHD) – Isle of Man
- Built-up area (BUA)
- Built-up Area Sub-division (BUASD)
- 2011 Census rural-urban classification
- 2011 Census Output Area classification (OAC)
- Decimal degrees latitude
- Decimal degrees longitude
- Local Enterprise Partnership (LEP) – first instance
- Local Enterprise Partnership (LEP) – second instance
- Police force area (PFA)
- Index of Multiple Deprivation (IMD)
- Cancer Alliance / National Cancer Vanguard (CALNCV)
- Sustainability and transformation partnership (STP)
