= Local Land and Property Gazetteer =

Address databases maintained by local authorities

A Local Land and Property Gazetteer (LLPG) is an address database maintained by local authorities, who are responsible for creating all addresses. However, until recently those same local authorities have not held a unified and consistent list of addresses within their areas. This has led to various services within individual local authorities maintaining separate and incompatible address databases.

== Database ==
In 2005, the central government of the UK has required local authorities to modernise their processes to take advantage of new technologies and provide better linked up services to their residents and businesses. One of the key ways to achieve this goal has been to develop one address resource for their entire local authority area. This has ultimately meant that a resident may notify a council of their change of address at one place without having to repeat the process throughout a number of service areas within an authority.

As part of this process the National Land and Property Gazetteer (NLPG) was created. This is a central repository or “hub” for all LLPGs and coordinates the many LLPGs created by local authorities. It also enforces the compliance of all LLPGs with the national standard for the representation of address information, British Standard 7666 (BS7666).

Largely through pressure from the central UK government for a consistent address resource the NLPG has become UK's definitive address infrastructure. However, the development of the NLPG has been held back by arguments between local authorities and the national mapping agency, Ordnance Survey, who are required to act as a trading entity. This has led to the NLPG being unable to compel local authorities to maintain their LLPGs as well as protracted negotiations regarding issues of ownership of address data.

In May 2005, local authorities in the UK signed an agreement (Mapping Services Agreement) with suppliers of geographic data, which included Ordnance Survey and the managers of the NLPG. This solved the issues surrounding ownership of address data and contained many restrictions on the use of LLPGs by local authorities as well as compulsions upon local authorities to maintain their LLPGs.

However, simultaneously, Ordnance Survey published a proposal to develop an alternative address infrastructure called the National Spatial Address Infrastructure (NSAI). This involved Ordnance Survey taking ownership of the NLPG and then selling it back to the same local authorities that had created the LLPGs that make up the NLPG. This provoked another round of arguments between Ordnance Survey and local authorities. The NSAI has now been abandoned by Ordnance Survey .

On 3 December 2010, the Secretary of State for Communities and Local Government announced the formation of GeoPlace to provide a freely-available national address gazetteer. This is a joint venture between the Local Government Association and Ordnance Survey. The venture underwent a process of approval by the Office of Fair Trading, which passed a judgement allowing the venture on 15 February 2011.

Following the setting up of GeoPlace, NLPG data has been brought together with Ordnance Survey, Valuation Office Agency and Royal Mail data into the National Address Gazetteer infrastructure. The National Address Gazetteer infrastructure is the single source from which the AddressBase products from Ordnance Survey are developed. Through agreement between Ordnance Survey and Scotland's Improvement Service, working on behalf of Scottish Local Government, the National Address Gazetteer includes DT
