= Mapping Services Agreement =

The Mapping Services Agreement (MSA) is a licensing contract between local authorities in the United Kingdom and suppliers of geographic data. Most of its contents are covered by commercial in confidence requirements. The general outcome of the MSA, however, is the supply of geographic data to local authorities and the defining of licensing issues regarding address data.

The MSA replaced an existing agreement for the supply of geographic data between local authorities, police, fire and other emergency services, and the national mapping agency, Ordnance Survey (OS). It also complied with European Union rules on procurement. As a result, suppliers of geographic information had to go through a process of open procurement managed on behalf of local authorities by the IDeA, an umbrella government organisation coordinating and promoting local authority good practice.

The result was that three suppliers were selected: Ordnance Survey, Intermap and Intelligent Addressing. For local authorities this meant little change in the supply of mapping data which continued to be supplied by OS. Intermap, however, supplied height data not previously covered by other arrangements.

Perhaps the most significant outcome of the MSA is the resolution of ownership, licensing and royalty issues that had existed between local authorities and OS. In the agreement the address databases (called Local Land and Property Gazetteers – LLPG) maintained by local authorities acknowledged the partial input of OS's address product, Address Point to these databases. In effect local authorities became "value added resellers" of ADDRESS-POINT and are required to pay OS royalties for the proportion of their use of the OS product.

The agreement also puts into place funding for the National Land and Property Gazetteer (NLPG), the UK's national address infrastructure, which is made up of the LLPGs compiled by local authorities. It also enables the NLPG to compel local authorities to maintain their LLPGs and thus ensure the nationwide coverage and compliance by local authorities.

The Mapping Services Agreement contract expired on 31 March 2012 and was replaced by the Data Co-operation Agreement.
