= National Street Gazetteer =

Database of all streets in England and Wales

The National Street Gazetteer (NSG) is an official database of all streets in England and Wales. It is compiled by the company GeoPlace from Local Street Gazetteers data, which is updated every month by the 175 local highway authorities. NSG acts as the authoritative reference dataset for streets in England and Wales.

Access is restricted to local authorities and statutory undertakers (e.g. for maintenance or installing services). A public version of the data is made available at www.findmystreet.co.uk, a website by Exegesis which was commissioned by GeoPlace in 2018. The database has 1,486,432 million streets backed by 18,865,643 features.

== History ==
Originally the NSG was managed by Ordnance Survey (OS). However, it became clear that OS was unwilling or unable to provide a rigorous management of the service. Part of this may have been because OS was operating outside of their acknowledged expertise in mapping rather than data management, although it has been suggested that OS simply saw no commercial advantage in developing the NSG.

In May 2005 the Mapping Services Agreement (MSA) was signed with local authorities. This was part of a long drawn out process of procurement for mapping data and included management of the NSG and the NLPG. The outcome of agreement involved the loss of the custodianship by OS of the NSG which was awarded to the data management company Intelligent Addressing Ltd who were already managers of the NLPG.

== Data flows and standards ==
In the United Kingdom local authorities have responsibility for the creation and maintenance of Local Street Gazetteers (LSGs). The NSG brings together the knowledge spread across local authorities and is a repository for combining the local street gazetteers they are required to keep. Maintenance of the NSG is covered by the National Streetworks Register legislation and is a statutory requirement of local authorities.

On a monthly basis, highway authorities are required to upload their street gazetteers, along with Associated Street Data (ASD), to the NSG; a master index built to the national standard BS 7666, for access by a number of other organisations via the NSG online hub and managed by GeoPlace. This enables third-party organisations such as public utilities to meet their statutory requirements to provide the appropriate streetworks notifications.

In effect, the NSG has become the authoritative streets database in England and Wales and provides a definitive identification of all streets with the use of a Unique Street Reference Number (USRN). The NSG has exceeded its initial aims to provide a consistent and unambiguous identification of streets and their associated streetworks. The street gazetteer has become a foundation for the National Land and Property Gazetteer (NLPG). It has also become the basis for Transport for London's (TfL) road network through the Pan London Street Gazetteer.

== See also ==
- National Address Gazetteer
