= Postcode lottery =

Unequal provision of services by area

In the United Kingdom, the postcode lottery is the unequal provision of services such as healthcare, education and insurance prices depending on the geographic area or postcode. Postcodes can directly affect the services an area can obtain, such as insurance prices. Despite having many non-postal uses, postcodes are only determined based on Royal Mail operations and bear little relation to local government boundaries. More broadly, there is an unequal provision of services around the country, especially in public services, such as access to cancer drugs in the healthcare system or quality of education. These are more likely to be a result of local budgets and decision-making than actual postcodes.

Postcodes were devised solely for the purposes of sorting and directing mail and rarely coincide with political boundaries. However, over time they have become a geographical reference in their own right with postcodes and postcode groups becoming synonymous with certain towns and districts. Further to this, the postcode has been used by organisations for other applications including government statistics, marketing, calculation of car and household insurance premiums and credit referencing.

== See also ==
- Unwarranted variation
