= Unique Property Reference Number =

United Kingdom unique identifier for properties and land parcels

The Unique Property Reference Number (UPRN) is a unique number (a geocode) for every addressable location—e.g., a building, a bus stop, a post box, a feature in the landscape, or a defibrillator—in Great Britain. Over 42 million locations have UPRNs, which can be found in Ordnance Survey's AddressBase databases.

For buildings, a UPRN provides a comprehensive, complete, consistent identifier throughout its life cycle, from planning permission through to demolition. For example, the UPRN for 10 Downing Street is 100023336956, and that for Bristol Central Library is 000000199356. UPRNs, of up to 12 digits allocated by OS and local authorities, do not contain information about the location but identify records in the ONS UPRN Directory (ONSUD).

UPRNs and USRNs (Unique Street Reference Numbers) are managed by GeoPlace, a joint venture between the Local Government Association and Ordnance Survey to create a definitive national databases of addresses and streets, and are available as open data under an Open Government Licence (OGL).

The Government Digital Service mandates the UPRN and USRN as "the public sector standard for referencing and sharing property and street information".

== ONSUD ==
The ONS UPRN Directory (ONSUD) relates the UPRN for each addressable location in Great Britain to a range of current statutory administrative, electoral, health and other area geographies. It also links UPRNs to 2011 Census Output Areas (OA) and Super Output Areas (SOA). It is produced by the Office for National Statistics (ONS) Geography group and is designed to complement the Ordnance Survey's AddressBase location intelligence databases.

The ONSUD is issued every six weeks using information supplied by the OS AddressBase, and is available for free download in comma-separated values (CSV) format from the ONS Open Geography Portal. The content is broken down by region, with data for each supplied as a separate file (with a file each for Wales and Scotland).

In most instances, it relates UPRNs to geographic areas as at the end of the preceding year. The ONSUD uses the Government Statistical Service (GSS) standard 9-character codes throughout; lookup files linking these codes to statutory area names are provided.

== Data fields ==
Each record in the ONSUD contains the following fields:

- Unique Property Reference Number
- Non-metropolitan county / metropolitan county / Inner London, Outer London
- County Electoral Division
- Local Authority District (LAD) / unitary authority (UA) / metropolitan district (MD) / London borough (LB) / (Scottish) council area (CA)
- Electoral ward / division
- Former Strategic Health Authority (SHA) / Local Health Board (LHB) / Health Board (HB)
- Country
- Region (former GOR)
- Westminster parliamentary constituency
- European Electoral Region (EER)
- Travel to Work Area (TTWA)
- LAU2 area
- National park
- 2011 Census Output Area (OA)
- 2011 Census Lower Layer Super Output Area (LSOA)/ Data Zone (DZ)
- Middle Layer Super Output Area (MSOA) / Intermediate Zone (IZ)
- Parish / community
- 2011 Census Workplace Zone (WZ)
- Clinical Commissioning Group (CCG) / Local Health Board (LHB) / Community Health Partnership (CHP)
- Built-up Area (BUA)
- Built-up Area Sub-division (BUASD)
- 2011 Census rural-urban classification
- 2011 Census Output Area classification (OAC)
- Local Enterprise Partnership (LEP) - first instance
- Local Enterprise Partnership (LEP) - second instance
- Police Force Area (PFA)
- Index of Multiple Deprivation (IMD)

== See also ==
- TOID
- Postcodes in the United Kingdom
