= Index of Place Names =

Index of places in Great Britain

The Index of Place Names (IPN) in Great Britain is published by the Office for National Statistics.

The IPN is a list of "places" in Great Britain. For each "place" included, the IPN lists which areas that place is located within, for each of a set of administrative geographies. The latest edition of the IPN (published July 2016) contains 87,338 entries.

An Index of Place Names was first produced for the 1831 Census. The last Index to be produced as a separate Census volume was published in 1985. Since then the IPN has been available in electronic format, initially as a CD, and, more recently, as a download. The most recent version can be downloaded for free as a CSV file through the ONS Open Geography Portal. A searchable online version of the IPN is also available on the ONS Open Geography Portal.

All place names are assigned to the appropriate administrative areas existing as at 31 December 2015. The Index gives some alternative names for places, as well as Welsh-language names where appropriate. The 2016 edition of the IPN is the first to also feature Scottish place names.

== Types of place included ==
The following types of "place" are included in the IPN (the IPN Place Name Type Code is in brackets):

- Locality (LOC) – villages, hamlets and localities without legally defined boundaries
- Historic County (CTYHIST)
- Lieutenancy County (CTYLT)
- Electoral ward/division (WD)
- Civil parish (PAR) (England and Scotland)
- Community (COM) (Wales)
- Unitary Authority (UA) (England and Wales)
- Council Area (CA) (Scotland)
- London borough (LONB) (England)
- Metropolitan District (MD) (England)
- Non-metropolitan District (NMD) (England)
- Non-metropolitan County (CTY) (England)
- National Park (NPARK)
- Region (RGN) (England)
- Built-up Area (BUA) (England and Wales)
- Built-up Area Sub-division (BUASD) (England and Wales)

== Fields included for each place name ==
Each record in the IPN relates the place name to the following fields (the IPN Field Name is in brackets after the description):

- Place Name Identifier (PLACEID) – unique numeric identifier ignoring splits across geographical areas
- Place Name Code (PLACE15CD) – code to identify place name taking into account splits across various geographical areas
- Place Name (PLACE15NM)
- Split Place name Indicator (SPLITIND) – shows where a place is split between two or more geographical areas. Each part is listed in a separate entry, with a different grid reference and a different identifying Place Name Code.
- Population Count (based on 2011 Output Areas best-fit population) (POPCNT) – for local government areas
- Place Name Description (DESCNM) – type of place, as listed above, i.e. BUA, BUASD, CA, COM, CTY, CTYHIST, CTYLT, LOC, LONB, MD, NMD, NPARK, PAR, RGN, UA, or WD
- Historic County Name (CTYHISTNM) – Definition A of the Historic Counties Standard
- Lieutenancy County Name (CTYLTNM) – ceremonial county (England), preserved county (Wales), or lieutenancy area (Scotland)
- Country Name (CTRY15NM)
- County Code (CTY15CD) – metropolitan county, non-metropolitan county, Inner London, Outer London
- County Name (CTY15NM)
- Local Authority District Code (LAD15CD)
- Local Authority District Name (LAD15NM)
- Local Authority District Description (LADDESCNM) – London borough (LONB), metropolitan district (MD), non-metropolitan district (NMD), unitary authority (UA), Council Area (CA)
- Electoral ward/division code (WD15CD)
- Civil parish code (England and Scotland), Community Code (Wales) (PAR15CD)
- Strategic Health Authority Code (England), Health Board Code (Scotland), Local Health Board Code (Wales) (HLTH12CD)
- Strategic Health Authority Name (England), Health Board Name (Scotland), Local Health Board Name (Wales) (HLTH12NM)
- Registration District Code (England and Wales) (REG15CD)
- Registration District Name (England and Wales) (REG15NM)
- Region Code (England) (RGN15CD)
- Region Name (England) (RGN15NM)
- National Park Code (NPARK15CD)
- National Park Name (NPARK15NM)
- Built-up Area Code (England and Wales), Built-up Area Sub-division Code (England and Wales) (BUA11CD)
- Westminster Parliamentary Constituency Code (PCON15CD)
- Westminster Parliamentary Constituency Name (PCON15NM)
- European Electoral Region Code (EER15CD)
- European Electoral Region Name (EER15NM)
- Police Force Area Code (PFA15CD)
- Police Force Area Name (PFA15NM)
- 1-metre grid reference (GRIDGB1M)
- 1-metre Easting grid reference (GRIDGB1E)
- 1-metre Northing grid reference (GRIDGB1N)
- 1-kilometre grid square reference (GRID1KM)
- Degrees latitude (to six decimal places) (LAT)
- Degrees longitude (to six decimal places) (LONG)

In the fields that present a code, the IPN uses the Government Statistical Service (GSS) standard nine-character codes.
