= Historic counties of the United Kingdom =

Ancient divisions of the United Kingdom

Historic county
- Also known as: Ancient or geographic county; Traditional county
- Location: United Kingdom
- Number: 92
- Possible types: England (39); Northern Ireland (6); Scotland (34); Wales (13)

The historic counties of the United Kingdom are ancient geographical divisions of the United Kingdom. Although not defined by any one function, over many centuries, various forms of administrative function have been based on them. These have included the areas of parliamentary constituencies, the court of quarter sessions, the areas in which a lord-lieutenant and sheriff serve, territorial units of the Militia, as well as the basis of the original county councils. Although these areas have subsequently changed, the historic counties on which they were originally based have not. The Office for National Statistics recommended them in the Index of Place Names as a stable, unchanging geography which covers the whole of Great Britain.

== History ==
=== England ===
The division of England into shires, later known as counties, began in the Kingdom of Wessex in the mid-Saxon period, many of the Wessex shires representing previously independent kingdoms. With the Wessex conquest of Mercia in the 9th and 10th centuries, the system was extended to central England. At the time of the Domesday Book, northern England comprised Cheshire and Yorkshire (with the north-east being unrecorded). The remaining counties of the north (Westmorland, Lancashire, Cumberland, Northumberland and Durham) were established in the 12th century. Rutland was first recorded as a county in 1159.

=== Scotland ===
The Scottish counties have their origins in the 'sheriffdoms' first created in the reign of Alexander I (1107–24) and extended by David I (1124–53). The sheriff, operating from a royal castle, was the strong hand of the king in his sheriffdom with all embracing duties – judicial, military, financial and administrative. Sheriffdoms had been established over most of southern and eastern Scotland by the mid-13th century. Although there was a degree of fluidity in the areas of these early sheriffdoms, the pattern that existed in the late mediæval period is believed to be very close to that existing in the mid-nineteenth century. The central and western Highlands and the Isles (where resistance to Government was strongest) were not assigned to shires until the early modern period, Caithness becoming a sheriffdom in 1503 and Orkney in 1540.

=== Wales ===
The present-day pattern of the historic counties of Wales was established by the Laws in Wales Act 1535. This Act abolished the powers of the lordships of the March and established the Counties or shires of Denbigh, Montgomery, Radnor, Brecknock and Monmouth from the areas of the former lordships. The other eight counties had, by then, already been in existence since at least the 13th century. The historic counties are, however, based on much older traditional areas.

=== Northern Ireland ===
The division of Ireland into counties began during the reign of King John (1199–1216). This process continued for several hundred years, as more of Ireland came under the control of the English crown. Munster was divided into counties in 1571 and Connaught in 1579. Finally, Ulster was shired during the reign of James I. The complete set of counties as they are today were laid down in 1584 (with their modern boundaries not finally settled until 1605, or 1613 in the case of Londonderry albeit that it had existed as County Coleraine from Anglo-Norman times). As in Wales the counties were generally based on earlier, traditional areas.

== List ==
Historic counties of the United Kingdom (detached parts not shown separately)

1. Aberdeenshire
2. Anglesey
3. Angus
4. Antrim
5. Argyllshire
6. Armagh
7. Ayrshire
8. Banffshire
9. Bedfordshire
10. Berkshire
11. Berwickshire
12. Brecknockshire
13. Buckinghamshire
14. Buteshire
15. Caernarfonshire
16. Caithness
17. Cambridgeshire
18. Cardiganshire
19. Carmarthenshire
20. Cheshire
21. Clackmannanshire
22. Cornwall
23. Cromartyshire
24. Cumberland
25. Denbighshire
26. Derbyshire
27. Devon
28. Dorset
29. Down
30. Dumfriesshire
31. Dunbartonshire
32. Durham
33. East Lothian
34. Essex
35. Fermanagh
36. Fife
37. Flintshire
38. Glamorgan
39. Gloucestershire
40. Hampshire
41. Herefordshire
42. Hertfordshire
43. Huntingdonshire
44. Inverness-shire
45. Kent
46. Kincardineshire
47. Kinross-shire
48. Kirkcudbrightshire
49. Lanarkshire
50. Lancashire
51. Leicestershire
52. Lincolnshire
53. Londonderry
54. Merionethshire
55. Middlesex
56. Midlothian
57. Monmouthshire
58. Montgomeryshire
59. Morayshire
60. Nairnshire
61. Norfolk
62. Northamptonshire
63. Northumberland
64. Nottinghamshire
65. Orkney
66. Oxfordshire
67. Peeblesshire
68. Pembrokeshire
69. Perthshire
70. Radnorshire
71. Renfrewshire
72. Ross-shire
73. Roxburghshire
74. Rutland
75. Selkirkshire
76. Shetland
77. Shropshire
78. Somerset
79. Staffordshire
80. Stirlingshire
81. Suffolk
82. Surrey
83. Sussex
84. Sutherland
85. Tyrone
86. Warwickshire
87. West Lothian
88. Westmorland
89. Wigtownshire
90. Wiltshire
91. Worcestershire
92. Yorkshire

== See also ==
- Historic counties of England
- Counties of Northern Ireland
- Shires of Scotland
- Historic counties of Wales
