= Historic counties of Wales =

Historical sub-divisions of Wales

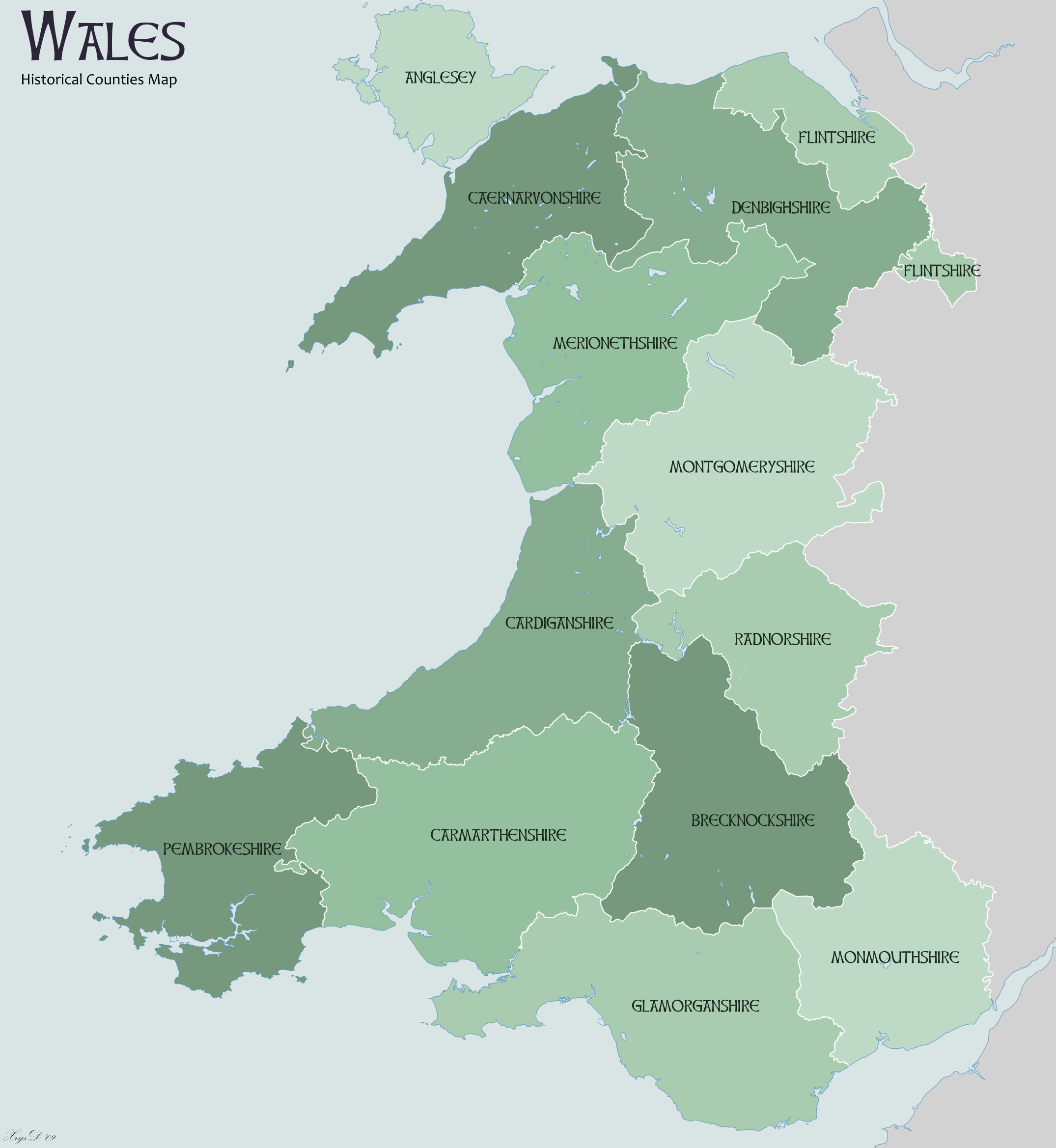
The thirteen historic counties of Wales, including the Maelor Saesneg as an exclave of Flintshire.

The historic counties of Wales (Welsh: siroedd hynafol) were the thirteen sub-divisions used in Wales from 1535 up to their abolition in 1974 when they were replaced by eight larger administrative counties (which in turn were replaced with the current twenty-two). They were used for various functions for several hundred years, with some dating to 1282, but for administrative purposes have been superseded by contemporary sub-national divisions, some of which bear some limited similarity to the historic entities in name and extent. They are alternatively known as ancient counties.

== The counties ==
The following population totals of the historical counties were collated by The Historic Counties Trust. The group used ward populations gathered by the ONS from the 2011 Census.

County	Welsh name	Population (2011 Census)	Notes
Monmouthshire	Sir Fynwy	514,723	(Note: County originates in 1535, with the Laws in Wales Act, 1535, converting the remaining Marcher Lordships into counties.)
Glamorganshire	Sir Forgannwg or Morgannwg	1,321,460	(Note: County predates the Edwardian conquest.)
Carmarthenshire	Sir Gaerfyrddin or Sir Gâr	184,232	(Note: County originates in 1282, following Edward I's conquest.)
Pembrokeshire	Sir Benfro	122,122	
Cardiganshire	Sir Aberteifi or Ceredigion	75,784	
Brecknockshire	Sir Frycheiniog	67,598	
Radnorshire	Sir Faesyfed	25,821	
Montgomeryshire	Sir Drefaldwyn	61,956	
Denbighshire	Sir Ddinbych	227,680	
Flintshire	Sir y Fflint	215,390	
Merionethshire	Sir Feirionnydd or Meirionnydd	37,874	
Caernarfonshire	Sir Gaernarfon	139,065	
Anglesey	Sir Fôn	69,751	

Despite being created at the same Act as the other counties, Monmouthshire was included with English counties for legal purposes until 1974. Between 1536 and 1974 the formulation "Wales and Monmouthshire" was frequently used.

The 1535 Laws in Wales Act abolished the marcher lordships within and on the borders of Wales. In the border areas, several were incorporated in whole or in part into English counties. The lordships of Ludlow, Clun, Caus and part of Montgomery were incorporated into Shropshire; and Wigmore, Huntington, Clifford and most of Ewyas were included in Herefordshire.

The historic counties established by 1535 were used as the geographical basis for the administrative counties, governed by county councils, which existed from 1889 to 1974. The historian William Rees said, in his 1959 Historical Atlas of Wales: "the boundaries of the modern shires have largely been determined by the ancient divisions of the country. The survival of these ancient local divisions within the pattern of historical change constitutes a vital element in the framework of the national life and helps to preserve its continuity."

== Four circuits of Wales ==
In the 1536 acts of the Union, a Court of Great Sessions in Wales was created in Wales for four separate circuits. The circuits each had 3 counties involved. Some of the original territorial Marcher lordships were split into regional circuits and others were created from regions of the former Principality of Wales:

- Anglesey, Caernarfon & Merioneth
- Flint, Denbigh & Montgomery
- Cardigan, Carmarthen & Pembroke
- Radnor, Brecon & Glamorgan

== Exclaves ==
The Counties (Detached Parts) Act 1844 abolished several enclaves. One of these, Welsh Bicknor (Llangystennin) was an exclave of Monmouthshire between Gloucestershire and Herefordshire and was transferred to Herefordshire. Two townships of the ancient parish of Cwmyoy were also exclaves of Herefordshire. Bwlch Trewyn was transferred to Monmouthshire, whereas the other, Ffwddog (identified using the English variant Fothock on older maps), was not.

The Herefordshire township of Litton and Cascob (in the parishes of Cascob and Presteigne), was transferred to Radnorshire.

The Denbighshire township of Carreghofa (in the parish of Llanymynech) was transferred to Montgomeryshire.

The exclaves of Flintshire, called English Maelor and Marford and Hoseley were left untouched.

== Monmouthshire ==
The territory which became Monmouthshire was part of the Welsh kingdoms of Gwent and Glywysing and later, after the Norman conquest of southern Wales, of the Welsh Marches. Although the original Laws in Wales Act 1535 specifically stated the lands making up Monmouthshire were from the 'Country or Dominion of Wales', the Laws in Wales Act 1542 added Monmouthshire to the Oxford circuit of the English assizes rather than falling under the Court of Great Sessions in Wales. According to historian John Davies, this arrangement was the cause of the erroneous belief that the county had been annexed by England rather than remaining part of Wales. In later centuries, some English historians, map-makers, landowners and politicians took the view that Monmouthshire was an English rather than a Welsh county, and references were often made in legislation to "Wales and Monmouthshire". The position was finally resolved by the Local Government Act 1972, which confirmed Monmouthshire's place within Wales.

== Local government ==
=== 1889 ===
The Local Government Act 1888 created a parallel system of administrative counties based on the historic counties in 1889. Additionally, certain boroughs were deemed to be county boroughs, outside the administrative counties (Cardiff and Swansea in 1889, Newport in 1891 and Merthyr Tydfil in 1908). As a result of 85 years of local government boundary changes, the boundaries of the administrative counties became increasingly different from the historic counties, until they were abandoned altogether for a different system of local government in 1974.

=== 1974 ===
The Local Government Act 1972 replaced the administrative counties created in 1889 with eight new administrative counties in 1974. The existing Lieutenancy areas were also redefined to use the newly created local government areas, defined by the act as "counties". Furthermore, use of the historic counties as postal counties was stopped by the Royal Mail in 1975 and those historic counties were no longer shown on maps. However, in spite of widespread misunderstanding, the Local Government Act 1972 never abolished the historic counties. Indeed, the Department of the Environment made this very clear in a statement it issued on 1 April 1974:

"The new county boundaries are solely for the purpose of defining areas of ... local government. They are administrative areas, and will not alter the traditional areas of Counties (the historic counties), nor is it intended that the loyalties of people living in them will change."

The eight new administrative counties were themselves replaced in 1996 by the current principal areas of Wales, but modified versions were retained for Lieutenancy as the preserved counties.

== Vice counties ==
The vice counties, used for biological recording throughout Great Britain and Ireland since 1852, are largely based on historic county boundaries. They ignore all exclaves and are modified by subdividing large counties and merging smaller areas into neighbouring counties. The static boundaries make longitudinal study of biodiversity easier.

== Index of Place Names ==
The historic counties of Wales are included in the Index of Place Names (IPN) published by the Office for National Statistics. Each "place" included in the IPN is related to the historic county it lies within, as well as to a set of administrative areas. The Historic Counties Trust has published demographic statistics for the historic counties of the UK from the 2011 United Kingdom census including a comparison of population and population density in the historic counties of England and Wales between the 1901 United Kingdom census and the 2011 United Kingdom census and a comparison of the number of Welsh speakers in the historic counties of Wales between the 1911 United Kingdom census and the 2011 United Kingdom census.
