= GeoPlace =

British organisation for overseeing address directories

GeoPlace is an organisation (LLP) established in 2010 that oversees the production and maintenance of national address and street gazetteers created and maintained with input from all local authorities in England, Wales and (later) Scotland. GeoPlace is a public sector limited liability partnership between the Local Government Association (LGA) and Ordnance Survey.

== History ==
On 3 December 2010, the Secretary of State for Communities and Local Government announced the formation of GeoPlace to provide a freely-available national address gazetteer. This is a joint venture between the Local Government Association and Ordnance Survey, which involved the acquisition of Intelligent Addressing. The venture underwent a process of approval by the Office of Fair Trading, which passed a judgement allowing the venture on 15 February 2011.

In 2020, GeoPlace Unique Property Reference Number (UPRN) and Unique Street Reference Number (USRN) data used to identify homes and streets were made freely available, opening up opportunities for the development of 'property passports' and logbooks, as well as supporting other government departments such as the Department for Transport.

== Activities ==
GeoPlace oversees the National Land and Property Gazetteer (NLPG), the National Street Gazetteer (NSG) and the National Address Gazetteer. The National Land and Property Gazetteer has been synchronised with address data from Ordnance Survey - Address Layer 2 (AL2). AL2 also incorporates Royal Mail Postcode Address File data. The combination of datasets from Local Government and Ordnance Survey is designed to create one definitive national address gazetteer. Through agreement with Scotland's Improvement Service Company, coverage has been extended to include Scotland.
