= Unique Street Reference Number =

Identifier for streets in the UK

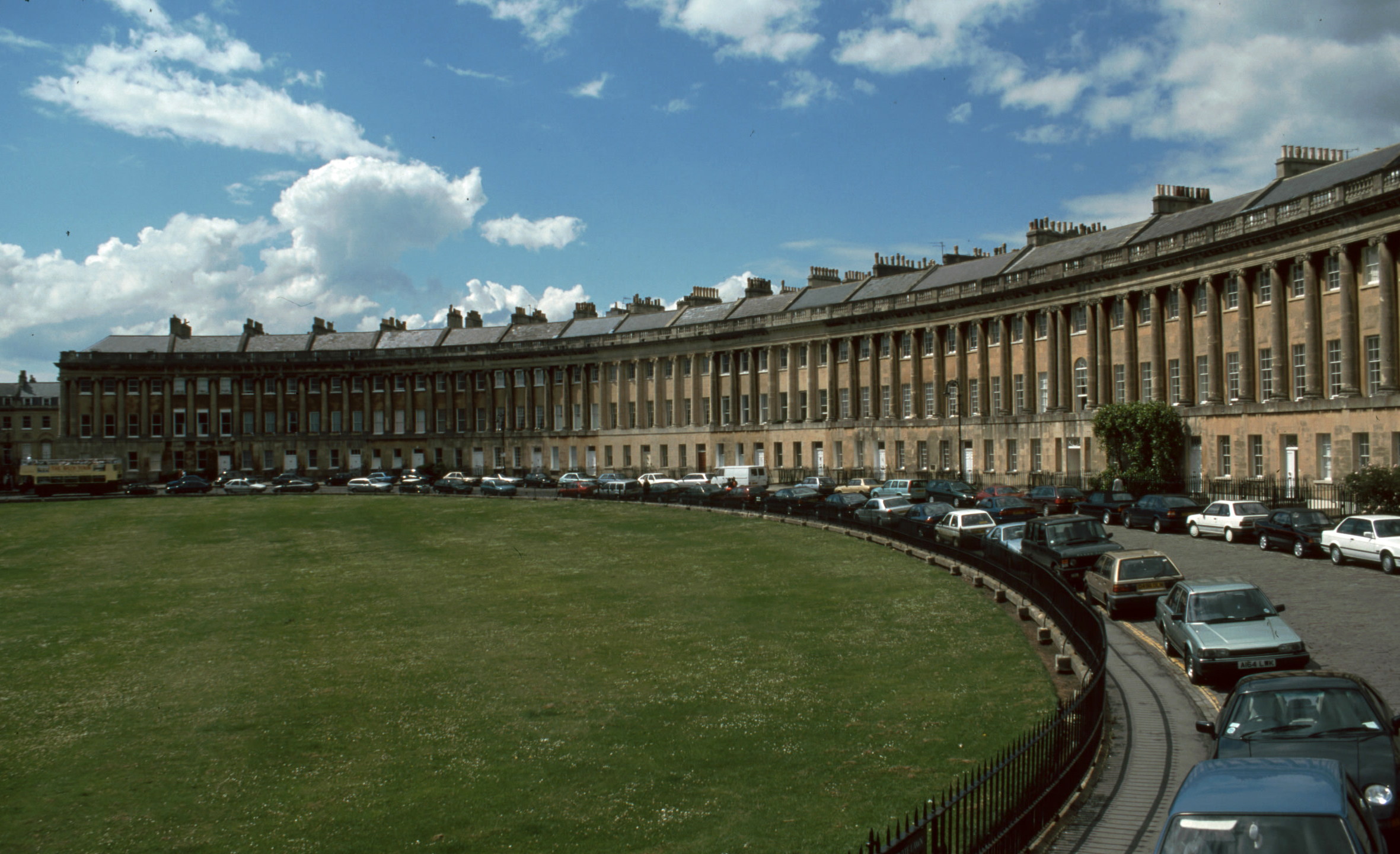
Royal Crescent in Bath - its USRN is 47901305.

The Unique Street Reference Number (USRN) is an eight-digit unique identifier (a geocode) for every street in the UK.

== Responsible agencies ==
USRNs for England and Wales are published in the National Street Gazetteer (NSG) database, the authoritative source of information about streets in England and Wales. The NSG is managed by GeoPlace, a joint venture between the Local Government Association and Ordnance Survey (OS). GeoPlace is also responsible for centrally managing and allocating USRN ranges to local authorities, which have sole statutory responsibility over assigning USRNs to streets. The locally assigned USRNs are then regularly fed back into the NSG via the Local Street Gazetteers.

USRNs in Scotland are managed by the Improvement Service and recorded in the Street Gazetteer of Scotland, the authoritative street database for Scotland. The data has been available alongside England & Wales data in OS products since 2021, enabled by the Public Sector Geospatial Agreement (PSGA).

In Northern Ireland USRNs are overseen by the Department for Infrastructure.

== Access to data ==
The USRN is available from the NSG and included in Ordnance Survey's OS MasterMap Highways Network product. USRNs can also be found on the site Find My Street created by GeoPlace.

From 1 July 2020, the Government requires USRNs and Unique Property Reference Numbers (UPRNs) to be available under an Open Government Licence (OGL). The OS Open USRN dataset is derived from the OS MasterMap Highways Network product.

The Government Digital Service has mandated the UPRN and USRN as "the public sector standard for referencing and sharing property and street information".
