= ONS Open Geography Portal =

Open geography portal

The ONS Open Geography portal from the Office for National Statistics (ONS) provides free and open access to the definitive source of geographic information products, web applications, story maps, services and APIs. All content is available under the Open Government Licence v3.0, unless otherwise stated.

== Overview ==
Products available include:

User guides and charts to UK statistical geographies and products available via the portal.

Maps and boundary data for UK statistical geographies: census, electoral, administrative, health, police, national parks etc.

Lookups to relationships between levels in hierarchical statistical geographies.

Register of Geographic Codes (RGC) - the definitive list of UK statistical geographies.

ONS UPRN Directory (ONSUD) for Great Britain - relates the Unique Property Reference Number (UPRN) for each GB address from AddressBase® Epoch 65 to a range of current statutory administrative, electoral, health and other statistical geographies.

ONS Postcode Directory (ONSPD) for the United Kingdom - relates both current and terminated postcodes in the United Kingdom to a range of current statutory administrative, electoral, health and other area geographies.

Index of Place Names - first produced after the 1831 Census, lists the names of localities and geography areas throughout England, Scotland and Wales.
