= Go City =

British tourism company

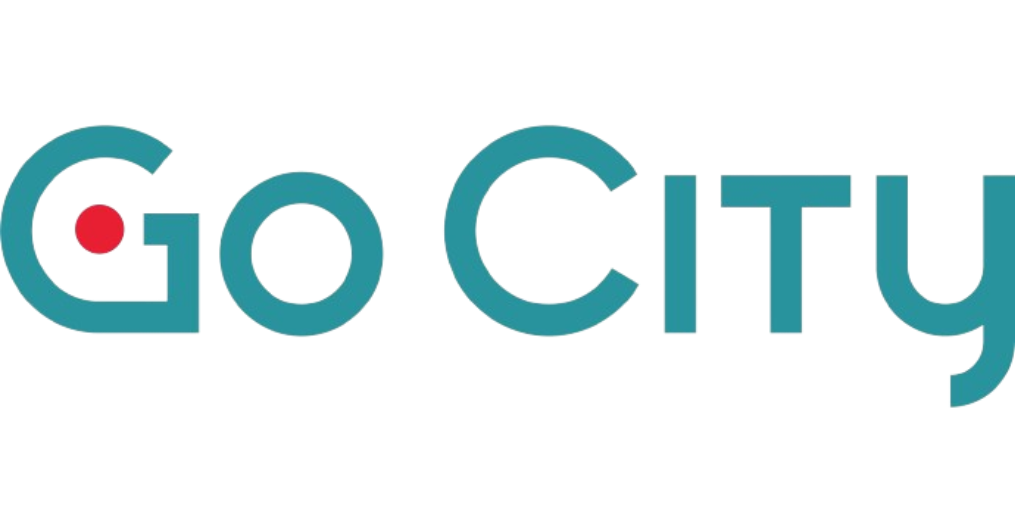
- Formerly: Leisure Pass Group
- Type: Private
- Industry: Travel
- Founded: 1999
- Headquarters: London, United Kingdom
- Key people: Sean O'Connell (CEO)
- Owner: Exponent Private Equity
- Website: gocity.com

Go City, formerly Leisure Pass Group, is a British travel company that offers discounted ticket packages to top tourist locations in 31 cities. It has over 7.5 million active users, and sells about 700,000 passes annually, making it the world's largest provider of tourist passes.

== History ==
The company was founded as Leisure Pass Group in 1999 by Angus Rankine and Andrew Grahame.

Primary Capital bought the company in 2012 for £35 million, under the arrangement of then-CEO Darren Evans. Exponent Private Equity, owner of Big Bus Tours, purchased the company from Primary Capital for £150 million on 12 December 2016. The 2016 purchase also merged two other similar companies, Smart Destinations and The New York Pass, into Leisure Pass Group.

Leisure Pass Group rebranded to Go City in July 2021.
