= National Address Gazetteer =

Database of spatial address data in Great Britain

The National Address Gazetteer is a database designed to provide a definitive source of publicly owned spatial address data for Great Britain. It is a culmination of Local Land and Property Gazetteers (collectively known as the National Land and Property Gazetteer (NLPG)) and other datasets: Address Layer 2 (AL2) and Royal Mail PAF data. The LLPGs, which make up a portion of the data, are created and maintained with input from all local authorities in England and Wales.

Following the setting up of GeoPlace, NLPG data has been brought together with Ordnance Survey, Valuation Office Agency and Royal Mail data into the National Address Gazetteer infrastructure. The National Address Gazetteer infrastructure is the single source from which the AddressBase products from Ordnance Survey are developed. Through agreement between Ordnance Survey and Scotland’s Improvement Service, working on behalf of Scottish Local Government, the National Address Gazetteer includes Scottish address data.

GeoPlace is an organisation (LLP) that oversees the production and maintenance of the National Address Gazetteer. GeoPlace is joint owned by the Local Government Association and Ordnance Survey.

== History ==
At the creation of the National Address Gazetteer in autumn 2011, the dataset only included spatial address data for England and Wales. However, through agreement with Scotland's Improvement Service Company, coverage is extended to include Scotland.
