= Mailsort =

Mailsort was a five-digit address-coding scheme used by the Royal Mail (the UK's postal service) and its business customers for the automatic direction of mail until 2012. Mail users who could present mail sorted by Mailsort code and in quantities of 4,000 upwards (1,000 upwards for large letters and packets) received a discounted postal rate.

== Use ==
Mailsort was not widely known to the British public and the code was not written as part of the address; rather it appears elsewhere on the envelope or label. Although the majority of people in the UK use the postcode, the mailsort code was used for automated sorting.

As the system was only used by a closed group of Royal Mail customers the scheme could be entirely re-coded from time to time (every 18–24 months). The last such update occurred in September 2010.

Unlike posting by ordinary mail it was possible to specify service levels other than 1st or 2nd class with longer delivery times offered. Four Mailsort products were available – known as 70, 120, 700 and 1400 – each based on the customer's ability to sort into increasingly smaller geographical areas. A further Walksort product was available to those who wished to post to many of the addresses in an area and who could present mail sorted first by mailsort code and then by walk number (the second half of the postcode).

=== Service levels ===
Level	Service	Requirements
Mailsort 1	delivery the next working day after the day of posting	sorted into Mailsort sequence
Mailsort 2	delivery three working days after the day of posting	sorted into Mailsort sequence
Mailsort 3	delivery within seven working days after the day of posting	sorted into Mailsort sequence
Walksort 1	delivery the next working day after the day of posting	sorted into Mailsort sequence and walk sequence
Walksort 2	delivery three working days after the day of posting	sorted into Mailsort sequence and walk sequence

Two further services — Presstream 1 and Presstream 2 — were available to publishers of magazines and other periodicals. These services were similar to Mailsort 1400 but offered a greater discount for publications that met certain criteria and had been successfully registered with Royal Mail.

== Structure ==
The first three digits, the Residue Selection Code, corresponded to an area which can vary in size from one postal district to several postcode areas, although most codes correspond exactly to one postcode area. For example:

- 406 corresponds to the KA and ML postcode areas;
- 451 and 452 correspond to the LS postcode area;
- 491 corresponds to the London SW postal area; and
- 502 corresponds to the BN postcode area

The last two digits, called the Direct Selection code correspond to one or more postal districts.

Mailsort codes were sometimes prefixed by a letter (A-P) which corresponded to sixteen regional divisions of the country, although the letter did not form part of the mailsort code. The letter prefix was used by the sender to ensure that when mail was presented to Royal Mail those items with the furthest to travel were given and processed first while those in the same region as the sender were dealt with last. When mail was presented to Royal Mail it was therefore not given in strict mailsort sequence and furthermore the sequence used would differ from one location in the country to another.
