= National Land and Property Gazetteer =

Initiative to compile all United Kingdom addresses

The National Land and Property Gazetteer (NLPG) is an initiative in England and Wales to provide a definitive and consistent address infrastructure. Up until recently Great Britain has not held a single list of all addresses in the country, meaning that many government and private services have not been sure if addresses from differing sources refer to the same or different properties.

The NLPG is made up of the input of Local Land and Property Gazetteers (LLPGs) maintained by local authorities that are the creators of all address information excepting postcodes. The NLPG then acts as a central repository or "hub" for LLPGs maintained by local authorities. The NLPG also enforces compliance by local authorities with the national standard for the representation of address information, British Standard 7666 (BS7666), and coordinates and enforces the maintenance of LLPGs by local authorities.

The NLPG is managed by the company GeoPlace, which is a public sector limited liability partnership between the Local Government Association (LGA) and Ordnance Survey.

The NLPG does not just hold addresses where people work or live, or addresses that have a postal address. The NLPG also includes 'non-addressable properties that are of no use for postal deliveries but can be vital information for emergency response, asset insurance, planning issues, repair and maintenance, and many other activities.'

In many ways the information held by the NLPG may be considered to hold a national model of land and property in the UK.

Although the NLPG may be considered to be in an intermediate stage of development, its usage has been taken up by a number of public and private organisations as it provides the most complete register of land and property in the UK.

== National spatial address infrastructure ==
On 26 May 2005 the Office of the Deputy Prime Minister proposed that ownership of the NLPG transfer from the IDeA to Ordnance Survey to allow for the creation of the National Spatial Address Infrastructure (NSAI).

On 3 December 2010, the Secretary of State for Communities and Local Government announced the formation of GeoPlace to provide a freely-available National Address Gazetteer. This is a joint venture between the Local Government Association (LGA) and Ordnance Survey which included the acquisition of Intelligent Addressing, the company that initially envisioned and coordinated the development of the NLPG.

Following the setting up of GeoPlace, NLPG data has been brought together with Ordnance Survey, Valuation Office Agency and Royal Mail data into the National Address Gazetteer infrastructure. The National Address Gazetteer infrastructure is the single source from which the AddressBase products from Ordnance Survey are developed. Through agreement between Ordnance Survey and Scotland’s Improvement Service, working on behalf of Scottish Local Government, the National Address Gazetteer includes Scottish address data.

== See also ==
- Local Land and Property Gazetteer (LLPG)
- National Street Gazetteer (NSG)
- Mapping Services Agreement (MSA)
