= Address Point =

Address Point is a mapping/GIS data product supplied by Great Britain's national mapping agency, Ordnance Survey. It is based on the UK’s postal mail organisation, the Royal Mail, list of postal addresses, Postcode Address File (PAF). The most significant difference between Royal Mail list and Address Point is that Address Point includes the geographic coordinates of each postal address. This enables users to map the individual addresses.

The Ordnance Survey website describes Address Point as:

"a dataset that uniquely defines and locates residential, business and public postal addresses in Great Britain. It is created by matching information from Ordnance Survey digital map databases with more than 26 million addresses recorded in the Royal Mail Postcode Address File (PAF).

Each address has a unique Ordnance Survey Address Point reference (OSAPR). In addition, Address Point carries a status flag to define the quality and accuracy of each address as well as indicators for change and source currency."

OSAPRs are always 18 characters long and must start with the letters AP.

The history of Ordnance Survey's spatial address information goes back to the 1840s when the first large-scale maps were published with names identifying prominent properties such as large landmark houses in a locality.

In 1945, when Ordnance Survey had moved to the National Grid system, maps at 1:1250 and 1:2500 scales showed sufficient information to infer other individual addresses. The recording of address information in large-scale data has been ongoing ever since. Address Point, which was launched in the early 1990s, was the first address-specific product in digital form. The latest evolution of Ordnance Survey's spatial address data is OS MasterMap Address Layer 2.

OS MasterMap Address Layer 2 offers significant enhancements such as classifications, building name aliases, geographical addresses, objects without a postal address, such as churches, and multiple occupancy information for flats and halls of residence where individual properties within do not have mail delivered to a letter box of their own. A free cross-reference table allows Ordnance Survey’s data to be linked with other key datasets, including the Valuation Office Agency’s Non Domestic Rates and Council Tax data.

== Accuracy of AddressPoint co-ordinates ==
Each address is coordinated on the National Grid, with eastings and northings normally quoted to a resolution of 0.1 metres. The accuracy of each georeference is classified within the status flag, in which is indicated whether the coordinates are due to be improved (PQ1) or as good as they can be (PQ3). Resources are directed towards continually improving the proportion of records with the PQ3 classification.
