= Jimmy White's 2: Cueball =

1999 video game

- Developers: Awesome Developments; Vicarious Visions (Game Boy Color)
- Publishers: Virgin Interactive; Vatical Entertainment (Game Boy Color version)
- Designer: Archer Maclean
- Composer: Allister Brimble (except Game Boy Color)
- Platforms: Microsoft Windows, Dreamcast, PlayStation, Game Boy Color
- Release: Windows: EU: April 1999; Dreamcast: EU: 7 January 2000; PlayStation: PAL: 7 April 2000; NA: 15 November 2000; Game Boy Color: EU: 2000
- Genres: Sports (snooker and pool)
- Modes: Single-player, multiplayer

Jimmy White's 2: Cueball is a snooker and pool video game developed by Awesome Developments and published by Virgin Interactive as a sequel to Jimmy White's 'Whirlwind' Snooker. It was originally released in 1999 for Windows and Dreamcast. A PlayStation version was released in 2000 in Europe and North America, with Bay Area Multimedia handling distribution for the latter territory. Archer Maclean, the designer of the original game, led the development team. The game includes mini-games connected with a pub setting. A Game Boy Color version of the game was released in 2000. A sequel to Cueball, called Jimmy White's Cueball World, was released in Europe for the PC in 2001. The game received mixed reviews from critics, with the PC and Dreamcast versions faring better than the PlayStation port.

== Gameplay ==
Gameplay is derived from a pool hall. The player can move between the main hallway, the snooker room, and the pool room. They can leave the game they were playing, and walk around the room, and begin other games without ending the earlier game they were playing. Cueball features a "BeeCam" option, which can be activated at any time. It follows an animated bee flying around the rooms serving as a cutscene to view the entire room. In the two games rooms, it has multiple routes. The player can explore the in-game world, referred to as "Jimmy White's House", which the in-game manual describes as "a mock-up of the kind of house Jimmy White probably lives in." The game features single-player and local multiplayer.

A number of features from Whirlwind Snooker were improved upon for Cueball, most notably the graphical engine. The game uses a 3D accelerator card enabling the player to peruse the table and the entire snooker or pool room. The shadows and reflections of the balls are rendered in much more detail, as are the cushions and pockets. The computer player (represented by a pair of disembodied hands in white gloves) can be viewed from any angle while taking a shot; these hands also visibly replace the coloured and cue ball once potted.

The in-game "floating hands" of the opponent/umpire flips a coin for the first to break.

Numerous items within the snooker and pool rooms are interactive. Some of them, such as the dartboard and draughts table, are mini-games. An arcade machine in the pool room features a fully playable version of Dropzone, one of Archer Maclean's earliest games. The pool room is a bar / diner featuring a jukebox and fruit machine. The game has a full classical soundtrack that can be controlled by the jukebox.

The game, like its predecessor, features comic elements. Should the computer player lay a particularly nasty snooker, an evil laugh is heard. Taking too long over a shot will send the computer player into a fit of sarcastic coughing. A soundbite of Homer Simpson exclaiming "D'oh!" is heard when a player pockets the cue-ball.

== Development ==
A small team known as Awesome Developments, which would later become UTV Ignition Games, began developing Cueball in 1997. The game was originally made to be promoted by a different publisher; however, they wanted an association football game, rather than one designed around snooker. This publisher would later be assimilated into Electronic Arts. Virgin Interactive became the project's next publisher with a Game Boy Color version of the game published by Vatical Entertainment, and developed by Vicarious Visions.

With the PC version of the game reaching over 300 megabytes, the Vicarious Visions team created a two-dimensional Game Boy Color demo for the game with a much smaller size. Awesome Development's lead, Archer Maclean, commented that he had received an email regarding the Game Boy Color game: "We've run out of sprites on the Game Boy. Do you think anyone in Englandshire will know if the Snooker game is played with only 9 reds??" The game was later released a year after the PC release, along with other console ports of the game.

Allister Brimble composed the game's soundtrack.

== Reception ==
Reception

Aggregate score
Aggregator	Score
GameRankings	PC: 80% PlayStation: 53% Dreamcast: 80%

Review scores
Publication	Score
IGN	PlayStation: 2.5/10
PSX Nation	PlayStation: 66%
Computer and Video Games UK	3/5
Dreamcast Monthly UK	Dreamcast: 80%

Jimmy White's 2: Cueball received mixed reviews from critics, with the PC and Dreamcast versions faring better than the PlayStation port. David Zdyrko writing for IGN called the game "painful", saying the game "lost a lot in its transition" to the PlayStation but reviewed the PC version positively. PSX Nation's J.M. Vargas was less critical, scoring the PlayStation game at 66/100, with the reviewer enjoying the music and mini-games.

Whilst reviewing the Dreamcast version of the game, Eurogamer called it "a highly polished and playable" cue sports simulator. The reviewer did prefer the pool simulation over the snooker, which the game is published under, noting that whilst the pool mode was fun the snooker was "a little too tricky for casual play". Now Gamer! was more critical of the Dreamcast version, calling the game "far from fun and enjoyable to play". They did comment on the soundtrack saying "the music is equally classical and fitting for the location".

Reviewing the Dreamcast version, Computer and Video Games said "as snooker games go, this is the best you'll find". UK Magazine Dreamcast Monthly called it "excellent" and a good pick for people looking for a snooker or pool game, despite not being "cutting edge entertainment." In reviewing the Game Boy Color release Video Game Magazine commented that whilst it was a good representation of the sport, the game's assets were "colorless and are also lovelessly animated". They also commented that it suffered from game crashes but was still a suitable representation of the sport. The Daily Telegraph reviewed the original World Snooker Championship game, commenting that whilst the game was a good snooker representation, Cueball 2, released 2 years prior was a "far more varied and interesting" game, and was "superior" "in every respect".

== Sequels ==
A sequel to the game, originally announced at E3 in 2001, known as Jimmy White's Cueball World, was released exclusively for the PC in 2001. Jimmy White would later put his name to pool video game Pool Paradise in 2004, and Jimmy White's Snooker Legend in 2008.
