= UTV Ignition Games =

Former British video game company

Ignition Entertainment Limited
- Logo used from 2011 to 2012
- Trade name: Ignition Entertainment; UTV Ignition Games
- Formerly: Valecombe Limited; UTV Ignition Entertainment
- Company type: Subsidiary
- Industry: Video games
- Founded: 26 September 2001; 24 years ago in Waltham Abbey, London
- Defunct: 20 January 2012; 14 years ago
- Fate: Liquidation by parent company
- Headquarters: Hammersmith, London, England
- Key people: Jatin Talwar
- Parent: The Walt Disney Company India
- Subsidiaries: Ignition London Limited; Ignition Entertainment Limited USA

Ignition Entertainment Limited, doing business as UTV Ignition Games, was a video game publisher of Indian media conglomerate UTV Software Communications. After The Walt Disney Company acquired UTV Software Communications as a wholly owned subsidiary for The Walt Disney Company India, UTV Ignition Games assets were liquidated.

== History ==
UTV Ignition Games originated as a British video game publisher in September 2001 called Valecombe Limited and was located in Waltham Abbey. The company was renamed Ignition Entertainment on 30 March 2002. It was created from a selection of smaller developers and publishers, such as Archer Maclean's Awesome Studios (also known as Awesome Developments and Awesome Games). In 2007, the company was acquired by UTV Software Communications and opened two new branches: Ignition Tokyo in Japan and Ignition Florida in the United States.

Focused on the production of games for the PlayStation Portable and Nintendo DS, the company has produced a selection of budget titles for the Game Boy Advance: Pool Paradise from Awesome Studios as well as the Nintendo DS game Zoo Keeper. The company also published SNK's full lineup in Europe which includes the Metal Slug series, Samurai Shodown series as well as The King of Fighters series. In 2005, the company had several games planned, including Mercury, The King of Fighters Neowave and Pool Paradise International. The company had acquired the rights to the tactical role-playing game Spectral Force Genesis. The game was released later that year in North America and Europe.

On 20 April 2007, the company announced the completion of their acquisition by UTV Software Communications, a media conglomerate based in India. On 17 December 2007, they announced the opening of two development studios – Ignition Florida, and Ignition Tokyo. Both studios were said to be working on proprietary intellectual property for next-generation platforms. The Tokyo studio was composed of former members of Clover Studio and Capcom, worked on the game El Shaddai: Ascension of the Metatron. On 21 April 2009, Ignition announced that they would be publishing Muramasa: The Demon Blade for the Wii in North America. On 22 October, they announced they would be publishing Arc Rise Fantasia. Ignition Entertainment also published The King of Fighters XII in North America and Europe for Xbox 360 and PlayStation 3 during Summer 2009.

On 2 November 2010, sources at UTV confirmed the closing of the Florida-based studio. Staff were given opportunities to relocate to Texas or find other work. This announcement followed the widespread allegations of sexual harassment by former boss Paul Steed and mismanagement of company funds. The title they were producing, Reich, had completed 2 of 9 major levels' costing roughly US$23 million. Despite major setbacks, the London office continued on in a more limited scope. Leaked footage of Reich was uploaded to YouTube in November 2010 by an unknown source.

On 30 January 2012, UTV Software Communications was acquired by the Indian subsidiary of The Walt Disney Company. As part of this deal, UTV announced that it would be liquidating Ignition Games' assets in an attempt to better integrate their publishing efforts with those of Disney. This involved the closure of the London studio the following month.

== Games published ==
Year	Title	Platform(s)	Developer(s)
2002	Monster! Bass Fishing	Game Boy Advance	AIA USA
2002	Demon Driver: Time to Burn Rubber!	Game Boy Advance	AIA USA
2002	Super Dropzone: Intergalactic Rescue Mission	Game Boy Advance, PlayStation	Eurocom
2003	Chop N' Drop	Game Boy Advance, PlayStation	System 3
2003	Strike Force Hydra	Game Boy Advance, PlayStation	Digi-Guys
2003	Archer Maclean's Pool	Game Boy Advance, PlayStation	Archer Maclean
2003	Stadium Games	Game Boy Advance	Ignition Entertainment
2004	Metal Slug 3	PlayStation 2, Xbox	SNK
2004	Metal Slug Advance	Game Boy Advance	Noise Factory
2004	The King of Fighters 2000	PlayStation 2	SNK
2004	The King of Fighters 2001	PlayStation 2	SNK
2004	Archer Maclean Presents Pool Paradise	GameCube, Microsoft Windows, PlayStation 2	Awesome Studios
2005	The King of Fighters: Maximum Impact	PlayStation 2, Xbox	SNK, Noise Factory
2005	Zoo Keeper	Nintendo DS	Success
2005	SVC Chaos: SNK vs. Capcom	PlayStation 2, Xbox	SNK
2005	Animaniacs: The Great Edgar Hunt	PlayStation 2, Xbox, GameCube	Warthog
2005	Animaniacs: Lights, Camera, Action!	Game Boy Advance, Nintendo DS	Warthog
2005	Archer Maclean's Mercury	PlayStation Portable	Awesome Studios
2005	The King of Fighters 2002	PlayStation 2, Xbox	SNK, Eolith
2005	Metal Slug 4	PlayStation 2, Xbox	Mega Enterprise, BrezzaSoft, Noise Factory, SNK
2006	Metal Slug 5	PlayStation 2, Xbox	Noise Factory, SNK
2006	The King of Fighters: Maximum Impact 2	PlayStation 2, Xbox	Noise Factory
2006	PoPoLoCrois	PlayStation 2, PlayStation Portable	Epics
2006	Samurai Shodown V	PlayStation 2, Xbox	Yuki Enterprise
2006	Mercury Meltdown	PlayStation Portable	Ignition Banbury
2006	Puyo Pop Fever	Nintendo DS, PlayStation Portable	Sonic Team
2006	The King of Fighters Neowave	PlayStation 2, Xbox	SNK
2006	NeoGeo Battle Coliseum	PlayStation 2	SNK
2006	Mercury Meltdown Remix	PlayStation 2	Ignition Branbury
2007	Blade Dancer: Lineage of Light	PlayStation Portable	Hit Maker
2007	Metal Slug Anthology	PlayStation Portable, PlayStation 2, Wii	Terminal Reality
2007	Art of Fighting: Anthology	PlayStation 2	SNK Playmore
2007	The King of Fighters XI	PlayStation 2	Terminal Reality, Alpha Denshi, SNK Playmore
2007	Mercury Meltdown Revolution	Wii	Ignition Banbury
2007	New Zealand Story Revolution	Nintendo DS	Taito
2008	SNK vs. Capcom: Card Fighters DS	Nintendo DS	SNK
2008	George of the Jungle and the Search for the Secret	PlayStation 2	7 Studios, Payapa Studios
2008	World Heroes Anthology	PlayStation 2	Prosoft
2008	SNK Arcade Classics Vol. 1	PlayStation 2, PlayStation Portable, Wii	Terminal Reality, Alpha Denshi, SNK
2008	Fatal Fury: Battle Archives Volume 1	PlayStation 2	SNK Playmore
2008	Metal Slug 7	Nintendo DS	SNK Playmore
2008	Obscure II	Microsoft Windows, PlayStation 2, PlayStation Portable, Wii	Hydravision Entertainment
2008	The King of Fighters Collection: The Orochi Saga	PlayStation 2	Terminal Reality
2008	Teenage Zombies: Invasion of the Alien Brain Thingys!	Nintendo DS	inLight Entertainment
2008	Tornado	Nintendo DS	SKONEC Entertainment
2008	Red Bull BC One	Nintendo DS	Smack Down Productions
2009	Blue Dragon Plus	Nintendo DS	Mistwalker, Feelplus, Brownie Brown
2009	Boing! Docomodake DS	Nintendo DS	Suzack, AQ Interactive
2009	Lux-Pain	Nintendo DS	Killaware
2009	Nostalgia	Nintendo DS	Matrix Software, Red Entertainment
2009	Muramasa: The Demon Blade	Wii	Vanillaware
2009	The King of Fighters XII	PlayStation 3, Xbox 360	SNK
2009	Samurai Shodown Anthology	PlayStation 2, PlayStation Portable, Wii	SNK, Terminal Reality
2009	The King of Fighters '98: Ultimate Match	PlayStation 2	SNK
2010	Arc Rise Fantasia	Wii	Imageepoch
2010	Deadly Premonition	Xbox 360	Access Games
2010	Spectral Force Genesis	Nintendo DS	Idea Factory
2010	Blacklight: Tango Down	Microsoft Windows, PlayStation 3, Xbox 360	Zombie Studios
2011	Swarm	PlayStation 3, Xbox 360	Hothead Games
2011	El Shaddai: Ascension of the Metatron	PlayStation 3, Xbox 360	Ignition Tokyo
2011	Faxion Online	Microsoft Windows	UTV True Games
2011	National Geographic Challenge!	PlayStation 3, Wii	Gusto Games
2011	Mercury Hg	PlayStation 3, Xbox 360	Eiconic Games
2012	Magical Drop V	Microsoft Windows	Golgoth Studio
2012	Fractured Soul: Deep Void	Nintendo 3DS	Endgame Studios
2012	Order Up!!	Nintendo 3DS	SuperVillain Studios
2012	Planet Crashers	Nintendo 3DS	Renegade Kid
2013	Kung-Fu: High Impact	Xbox 360	Virtual Air Guitar Company

== Cancelled ==
- Reich
- WarDevil / Project Kane
