= PQ =

PQ may refer to:

== Places ==
- Province of Quebec, the largest province of Canada by area
- Rancho Peñasquitos, San Diego, informally

== Politics and law ==
- Parti Québécois, a provincial political party in Quebec, Canada
- Parliamentary question, a question posed during Question time in a Westminster system legislature
- Previous question, a motion in Robert's Rules of Order to close debate

== Computing and electronics ==
- Perceptual quantizer, a transfer function for video display
- Picture quality; see video quality
- Power quality, the set of limits of electrical properties
- Priority queue, an abstract data structure

=== Software ===
- PowerQuest, a producer of computer HDD software tools for the DOS/Windows platform
- Priority queuing, a data packet scheduling technique
- libpq, a C library for the PostgreSQL database

==== Videogames ====
- Police Quest, a video game series
  - Police Quest: In Pursuit of the Death Angel (1987 video game), first game in the series
- PQ: Practical Intelligence Quotient (2005 video game), first game in the series
- Persona Q: Shadow of the Labyrinth, a 2014 video game

== Science, technology, and mathematics ==
=== Psychology ===
- Play Quotient, a theory in child development developed by Stevanne Auerbach
- Precision questioning, an intellectual toolkit for critical thinking and for problem solving

=== Chemistry, biochemistry, pharmacology ===
- Performance qualification, in pharmaceutics, part of verification and validation
- Plastoquinone, a molecule involved in photosynthesis

== Sports ==
- PQ International, a polo magazine
- Pickleball Quebec

== Other uses ==
- PQ, outbound Arctic convoys of World War II

== See also ==
- PQ1 (disambiguation)
- PQ2 (disambiguation)
- PQ3 (disambiguation)
