= I.Q.: Intelligent Qube =

1997 puzzle video game

Intelligent Qube
- North American version cover art
- Developer: G-Artists (Note: Sony Computer Entertainment Japan assisted on development.)
- Publisher: Sony Computer Entertainment
- Director: Kenji Sawaguchi
- Producer: Tetsuji Yamamoto
- Designer: Masahiko Sato
- Programmer: Yukio Watanabe
- Artist: Norio Nakamura
- Composer: Takayuki Hattori
- Platform: PlayStation
- Release: JP: January 31, 1997; EU: October 1997; NA: November 17, 1997
- Genre: Puzzle
- Modes: Single-player, multiplayer

Intelligent Qube, (Note: I.Q インテリジェントキューブ, I.Q Interijento Kyūbu) also known as Kurushi in Europe, is a 1997 puzzle video game developed by G-Artists and published by Sony Computer Entertainment for the PlayStation. In the game, the player controls a character who must run around a platform made of cubes, clearing certain cubes as they approach. Cubes are "cleared" by marking a spot on the stage, waiting for the cube to roll on top of it, and then deactivating the marked spot.

The game was well received by critics. The game performed well commercially in Japan and won the Excellence Award for Interactive Art at the 1997 Japan Media Arts Festival.

== Game mechanics ==
=== Overview ===
A screenshot of gameplay. The player has just triggered an advantage cube.

At the beginning of each level, the player is put on a stage with 23-30 rows. Although the game has a two-player mode, the two players simply take turns. Then 12-16 rows of the stage are raised. Anywhere between 1 and 4 sets of rows comes at the user at one time. On the first stage, 3 rows of length 4 (12 blocks) come at the user at one time. On the last stage, 14 rows of length 7 (98 blocks) come at the user at one time. When all the blocks in one set are destroyed, more blocks are raised—this happens 3 times, for a total of 4 block risings per level.

If the player ever falls off the stage, either by standing on the final row as it is eliminated, or by being "avalanched" off by rising blocks, the game is over.

=== Cube types ===
The cubes that approach are of three types:

- Normal cubes: Normal cubes are usually gray (the same color as the stage cubes the player moves around on), though this texture can change to some other color depending on the stage reached or on the game's settings. These cubes should be cleared.
- Advantage cubes: Advantage cubes are green and should be cleared. Clearing one of these cubes marks its location with a green square. This square can be subsequently triggered to clear the surrounding 3x3 area in one move. Multiple green cubes can be cleared normally, and puzzles usually incorporate advantage cube chains. If a spot is marked by a green square, it cannot be marked in the normal manner until the advantage cube's special feature is triggered. Effective use of advantage cubes is the key to solving puzzles efficiently. At the same time however, the player must make sure that no forbidden cube is included in the marked area (see below).
- Forbidden cubes: Forbidden cubes are black. These cubes should not be cleared, but should instead be allowed to fall off the stage. For every forbidden cube cleared, a row of the stage is lost, and a perfect score for that wave is no longer possible. In the first I.Q.: Intelligent Qube, if the player captures a Forbidden cube, red marks in the block scale will be cleared. Forbidden Cubes can be marked without being captured by an area surrounded by an Advantage Cube.

=== Additional penalties ===
If normal cubes or advantage cubes fall off the end of the stage without being cleared, the number of fallen cubes will be calculated on the block scale (i.e. a counter is increased by 1). Every time the number of fallen cubes exceeds that of the block scale, a row of the stage is lost (thereby reducing the number of rows the cubes have to travel to fall off). This number is equal to the width of the stage minus one. On the first stage, the stage is 4 cubes wide, so the limit is 3; on the final stage, the limit is 6 because the stage is 7 cubes wide. If a normal or advantage cube falls off the end of the stage, that set is not considered perfect (see below).

If the player is flattened by rolling cubes, the cubes will race to the end of the stage and fall off. All cubes (including forbidden cubes) will be counted on the block scale, and can make several rows of the stage fall away. The player will then have to face the same set of cubes again (except if the puzzle is the last set on the wave).

=== Bonuses ===
After each set of blocks is destroyed, if the player did so without destroying any forbidden cubes and cleared all normal and advantage cubes then they are rewarded a bonus for perfection, and an additional row is added to the end of the stage (thereby increasing the number of rows the cubes have to travel to fall off the edge). This is accompanied by a booming "Perfect!" from the announcer. Solving puzzles perfectly becomes increasingly important as the game progresses because later puzzles require more rolls, and hence more rows of running space, to complete successfully.

The perfection bonus takes into account how many cube rolls it took to clear all the cubes. From the time the first cube is cleared until the time the last cube is cleared, the counter increments. The immediate consequence of this is that one can mark a spot on the stage and wait to clear it until several rows of cubes roll over the top of it. An initial number of rolls is set as being an ideal number to clear. If the player clears the cubes in exactly this number of rolls (Perfect in Kurushi Final), they are given a "Brilliant" bonus of 5,000 points (10,000 in Kurushi Final). If the player clears the cubes in more than this number of rolls (Great in Kurushi Final), they are given a bonus of 1,000 points (2,000 in Kurushi Final). If the player clears the cubes in fewer number of rolls (Excellent in Kurushi Final), they are given a "True Genius" bonus of 10,000 points (15,000 in Kurushi Final).

=== Scoring ===
Clearing an individual cube is worth 100 points. Cubes cleared while an advantage cube is being detonated are worth 200 points each, regardless of if they are being cleared by the player or the advantage cube. At the end of each level, the number of the rows left on the stage is multiplied by 1,000 and added to the score—this score typically has a maximum of 40,000 (Except for the 1st, 3rd and Final Stages, their maximum scores are 27,000, 39,000 and 29,000 respectively).

When the game is over, either by finishing all the levels or by falling off the stage, the total score is displayed, as well as an I.Q. This I.Q (a play on the term "intelligence quotient") is ostensibly the player's efficiency in clearing cubes, on a scale of 0 to 999 (for instance, beating the game without using a continue gives the player an I.Q of at least 350). However, it is simply a percentage of the score. Total scores for a well-played game without the use of continues are in the order of 1 million points. If the player falls of the stage, the progress of the game is displayed and an option to continue playing is given.

By beating the game multiple times, additional characters that move faster than the default character, are unlocked. Characters include Eliot (the default), Cynthia (Cherry in Kurushi), and Spike the dog. Each complete playthrough of the game takes approximately two hours at Level 0 speed, or about 75 minutes at Level 4 speed. Also, by beating the game once, players can unlock the Original Mode where they can create their own puzzles. However, IQ and roll counters are not calculated.

== Kurushi Final ==
A sequel to I.Q. was released as I.Q Final for Japan in 1998 and Kurushi Final: Mental Blocks for Europe in 1999. The gameplay is similar to the first game, but there are several differences in terms of design, and new challenges are added such as 100 Attack, Survival Mode, and Create. In this game, the new default character is Abel. Unlike the first game, there are different unlockable characters, including the original characters from I.Q.: Intelligent Qube. New unlockables include Kimti (a cave man), April (a nurse), Morgan (a military man), Dickson (a basketball player), and Atlas (a polar bear).

=== Kurushi Final ===
This is the normal game mode of the titular game. However, by beating the game with an IQ of 500 or above or staying in Survival Mode for 20 minutes or longer, the player unlocks Tektonics. If the player gets a game over, instead of being asked to continue playing, the game allows the player to select a stage from the first up to the furthest stage that was cleared (8th Stage being the maximum).

==== Tektonics ====
Tektonics is an extra minigame unlocked after beating the game with an IQ above 500 or playing Survival Mode for 20 minutes or longer. This mode tests the player's skills in Kurushi. This is a game mode where the player must face a huge puzzle which lasts for only one set in 20 waves.

=== 100 Attack ===
A game mode where the player faces 100 singular puzzles with the aim of clearing them within a set number of rotations.

=== Survival Mode ===
This mode is similar to the normal gameplay. However, the game has no end. The player must survive as long as he can to unlock several characters. Staying in this mode for 20 minutes or longer unlocks Kurushi Tektonics

=== Create ===
Similar to the Original Mode of the original IQ (see above) the only difference is that the total number of rotations are calculated.

== Development ==
I.Q.: Intelligent Qube was designed by Masahiko Sato, a professor at the Tokyo University of the Arts. Sony Computer Entertainment Japan assisted on development. Reviewers often remark on Takayuki Hattori's soundtrack, which opts for an eerie orchestral score rather than a typical 'bouncy' puzzle game fare. It was released by Sony Music under the title IQ Final Perfect Music File on January 21, 1999.

== Reception and legacy ==
Reception

Aggregate score
Aggregator	Score
GameRankings	72%

Review scores
Publication	Score
AllGame	4.5/5
Edge	7/10
Electronic Gaming Monthly	7.875/10
Famitsu	7/10, 4/10, 7/10, 5/10
Game Informer	7.5/10
GameFan	87% (Note: Three critics of GameFan gave the game each a score of 87, 88, and 85.)
GameRevolution	C
GameSpot	6.6/10
IGN	8/10
Official U.S. PlayStation Magazine	3/5
Dengeki PlayStation	50/100, 70/100, 80/100, 90/100

Intelligent Qube received mostly positive reviews. Game Informer gave the game a positive review, over two months before its release Stateside. In Japan, however, Famitsu gave it a score of 23 out of 40.

While some critics took issue with the lack of a simultaneous multiplayer mode and the presence of graphical glitches and slowdown in spite of the game's undemanding visuals, most concluded that the game's well-balanced, intelligent challenge outweighs its shortcomings. A number of them additionally praised its music. On GameRankings, the game held an aggregate score of 72% based on seven reviews at the time of the site's closure in December 2019.

Critics often commented on how the game seemed unappealing, but proved to be highly engaging if given a chance. Julian "Jaz" Rignall of IGN remarked, "Although this doesn't exactly sound like a bundle of laughs, it's actually really fun," though he questioned its value-for-money as compared to games such as G-Police and Colony Wars, which cost only slightly more while offering far more sophisticated graphics and sound. Likewise, Dan Hsu confessed in Electronic Gaming Monthly that "Frankly, I thought this game looking boring and stupid the first time I saw it. After I played it for 10 minutes, I thought I was right. Then one hour passed, then another. Pretty soon, I was hooked (and majorly surprised, needless to say)." His co-reviewer Howard Grossman wrote that "True to its name, it's centered around planning and execution rather than simple fast reflexes. There are few last-minute saves and lucky combos to compensate for real 'IQ'." GamePro called it "a wildly challenging and exciting game that manages to provide the perfect mix of reward and frustration." (Note: GamePro gave the game two 4.5/5 scores for graphics and control, and two 5/5 scores for sound and fun factor.)

Electronic Gaming Monthly named it a runner up for "Puzzle Game of the Year" (behind Bust-A-Move 3) at their 1997 Editors' Choice Awards.

According to Media Create sales data, I.Q.: Intelligent Qube was a financial success in Japan, having sold 500,000 copies by March 1997 and nearly 750,000 copies by the end of 1997.

A few sequels were made including I.Q. Final (Kurushi Final: Mental Blocks in Europe) for the Sony PlayStation and I. Q. Remix+: Intelligent Qube for the PlayStation 2. In 2006, I.Q. Mania for the PlayStation Portable, which contains puzzles from all three previously released Intelligent Qube games, was released in Japan.

I.Q.: Intelligent Qube was re-released on PlayStation Network in Japan and Europe. Another mobile phone incarnation was announced by Upstart Games in 2005, but it is unknown if it was ever released. The game is one of twenty games included on Sony's PlayStation Classic.

In 2022, I.Q.: Intelligent Qube was added to the premium part of PlayStation Plus.

== See also ==
- PQ: Practical Intelligence Quotient
- PQ2: Practical Intelligence Quotient 2
