= Archer Maclean's Mercury =

2005 video game

- North American box art
- Developer: Awesome Studios
- Publisher: Ignition Entertainment: JP: Sony Computer Entertainment
- Director: Archer Maclean
- Designers: Archer Maclean; Rich Hancock; Neil Wigfield
- Platform: PlayStation Portable
- Release: NA: 6 April 2005; JP: 4 August 2005; EU: 1 September 2005; AU: 21 September 2005
- Genre: Puzzle-platform
- Mode: Single-player

Archer Maclean's Mercury is a 2005 puzzle-platform video game developed by British company Awesome Studios and published by Ignition Entertainment for the PlayStation Portable. It was conceptualized by the eponymous British game programmer Archer Maclean.

In Mercury, the goal is to guide a drop of mercury to its appointed destination by tilting the stage, in a similar fashion to Super Monkey Ball. Levels come in different varieties that prioritize unique methods of completing them. The game was conceived when Archer Maclean used a minigame from Jimmy White's Cueball World and added liquid metal physics. It was originally designed to have motion controls by using a tilt sensor peripheral for the PSP, but this version was never released due to technical constraints.

The game received positive reception for its original concept and level designs, but was also criticized for its difficulty. The success of the game resulted in two sequels. The first, titled Mercury Meltdown, was released for PSP, then revised and ported onto PlayStation 2 and Wii. The second, titled Mercury Hg, was released for PlayStation 3 and Xbox 360.

== Gameplay ==
One of the Task levels. The droplet of mercury can be split, changed color, and merged to create a new color.

Mercury is a puzzle video game. The player guides a drop of mercury in the desired direction by tilting the stage with the PSP's analog stick. The player uses the directional buttons to toggle between focusing on all mercury droplets or the largest droplet. The objective of each level is to navigate the mercury around the stage and reach the goal. The HUD consists of a time limit, a mercury level gauge, and a beacon count. To clear a level, all beacons must be activated within the time and mercury limit. If the amount of Mercury on the level drops below the limit or the time expires, the level ends in failure and must be restarted.

Each stage has hazards and obstacles designed to reduce the amount of mercury. The mercury can also be split into separate parts by using sharp objects or other hazards. Paint Shops are floating devices that change the color of the mercury once the mercury is under it. Some switches and doors activate when interacting with mercury of a specific color. If the mercury is split up, the two droplets can be colored differently; if the two then merge, they form a new color. Color mixing is based on the RGB color model. For example, a red droplet and a green droplet can be merged to form a yellow one.

There are a total of six worlds. Each world is split into three Race levels, three Percentage levels, three Task levels, two Combo levels, and one Boss level. Race levels prioritize completing the level as fast as possible more than mercury count. Percentage levels emphasize preserving Mercury over quick completion. Task levels feature multiple beacons that must be activated, and there can be from one to six of them in such a level. Combo levels are either a combination of Race and Percentage levels or a combination of Percentage and Task levels, therefore requiring the player to preserve an amount of Mercury for the purpose of completing the level. Boss levels are the last levels in each world and are basically a combination of Race, Percentage, and Task. Once the player completes the boss level, the next world becomes available. If the highest score is achieved in all 12 levels of one particular world, a bonus 13th level is unlocked. Additionally, once all six worlds are cleared, a secret 7th world is unlocked, with levels here unlocked by achieving high scores in regular levels.

== Development and release ==
Mercury was developed by Awesome Studios with Archer Maclean as the lead designer. The game was inspired by platformer puzzle games similar to Super Monkey Ball and Marble Madness. The game was conceived when Maclean used the labyrinth minigame from Jimmy White's Cueball World and implemented a "liquid metal physics" prototype engine. Maclean chose to study the physics of mercury by obtaining a bottle of real mercury taken from barometers. During development, one of the challenges Awesome Studios had was emulating real mercury physics, particularly how the mercury would split and merge. During the playtesting stage of development, Awesome Studios noticed potential shortcuts in the level layouts and adjusted the level design to allow more of them. The game was originally advertised to be released with a tilt sensor peripheral to use motion controls, but it could not be implemented due to cost and technical issues. Maclean chose to release the game on the PSP as it could make it more noticeable for consumers. This resulted in the game having a tight production schedule to match the launch of the PlayStation Portable, causing the developers to cut corners in production. This led to the finished product being less refined than they intended it to be.

Mercury was published by Ignition Entertainment and released in North America on 6 April 2005. Sony Computer Entertainment released the game in Japan with minor adjustments in August 2005. It was released in Europe on 1 September 2005 as a launch title for the PSP, with distribution handled by Atari Europe in the UK, France and Germany. it was followed by an Australian version with its release date of 21 September. A limited edition bundle was released with its sequel, Mercury Meltdown, on 19 October 2010.

== Reception ==
Reception

Aggregate score
Aggregator	Score
Metacritic	75/100

Review scores
Publication	Score
Edge	8/10
Eurogamer	8/10
Game Informer	6.75/10
GameSpot	7.8/10
GameSpy	3.5/5
GameZone	8.1/10
IGN	7.7/10
Official U.S. PlayStation Magazine	3.5/5
Pocket Gamer	3.5/5
Push Square	7/10
The Sydney Morning Herald	4/5

Mercury received "generally favorable reviews" according to the review aggregation website Metacritic. IGN awarded the game for Best Innovative Design in their "Best of 2005" awards.

The game was praised for its level design and physics. Eurogamer praised the level designs, calling them "ingenious". IGN was impressed with the number of levels and the variety between the different designs. GameSpot gave compliments towards the physics of the mercury on how it can be "stretched, reassembled and squeezed together". GameSpy, however, gave a mediocre response to the level design, stating the best ones are clever and addicting, but the worst ones make the player jump through too many hoops. Pocket Gamer made comparisons to the Lumines series stating, "Lumines is more fun to play, but Mercury is more satisfying to beat."

In regards to the difficulty, the game had mixed reception. PALGN noted the difficulty can scale to "ridiculous levels", but defended it by assuring that it does not feel impossible. GameSpot noted that the game was not impossible even at its most difficult, but criticized the difficulty pacing, stating "The game pretty much throws you off the deep end almost immediately after you've completed the idiotically simple tutorial." Edge, however, praised the difficulty, stating, "Mercury exhibits a perfect hierarchy of challenge and reward, the two remaining poised throughout and ultimately growing to the point where they touch and become one. The pain becomes the pleasure because, in spite of the extraordinary degree of trial and error, there's never a moment that feels broken or exploitative."

== Legacy ==
Aggregate review scores
Game	Metacritic
Mercury Meltdown (PSP) Mercury Meltdown Remix (PS2) Mercury Meltdown Revolution (Wii)	78/100; 73/100; 77/100
Mercury Hg (PS3 & Xbox 360)	74/100

Archer Maclean's Mercury inspired two sequels. The first sequel, titled Mercury Meltdown, was released for the PSP. The game features new puzzles and modes, as well as a more vibrant and cartoon-like style of graphics. The game was ported to the PlayStation 2 titled Mercury Meltdown Remix and to the Wii called Mercury Meltdown Revolution.

Another sequel, titled Mercury Hg, was developed by Eiconic Games for Xbox 360 and PlayStation 3. The game includes 60 new levels, an online leaderboard, and a music feature which allows the mercury blob and stage to pulsate to the player's music. The game was announced in E3 2011. Eiconic chose to go back to the core elements of the original and added a style in which the developers described as "clean and stylish". Ignition Entertainment released the game on September 28, 2011. The game also features ghost racing, the ability to share replays, and Sixaxis tilt controls for the PlayStation 3 version. Two downloadable content (DLC) packages were released for the game. The first DLC titled "Heavy Elements" was released on October 19, 2011, and contains thirty discovery mode levels, ten bonus levels, and five challenges levels. The second DLC titled "Rare Earth Elements" was released on November 29, 2011, and contains the same amount of content as the previous.
