= Mercury Hg =

2011 puzzle-platform video game

- Developer: Eiconic Games
- Publisher: UTV Ignition Games
- Directors: Dave Pollard; Simon Credland
- Producers: Dave Pollard; James Boulton
- Designers: Neal Jones; Graeme Monk
- Series: Mercury
- Platforms: PlayStation 3, Xbox 360
- Release: PlayStation 3: NA: September 27, 2011; EU: September 28, 2011; Xbox 360: WW: October 19, 2011
- Genre: Puzzle-platform
- Mode: Single-player

Mercury Hg is a puzzle-platform game developed by British studio Eiconic Games and published by UTV Ignition Games. It is the third entry in the Mercury series. The goal is to navigate a blob of mercury to a goalpost by tilting the stage without losing all of the mercury. The mercury can be split apart into multiple blobs, change colors using Paintshops, and be remerged into a new color. In addition, the game utilizes an online leaderboard, ghost sharing, and the ability to insert music into the levels.

The game was released in North America on September 27, 2011, on PlayStation 3 via PlayStation Network and in Europe the following day. The Xbox 360 version was released via Xbox Live Arcade internationally on October 19, 2011. In addition, the game received two DLC packages titled "Heavy Elements" and "Rare Earth Elements". The game was praised for its visual style and level designs, but was criticized for being too easy and lacking features from its predecessors.

== Gameplay ==
The HUD consists of two bars (left) to measure Par time and amount of remaining mercury. The Roll (top) and Tilt (right) bar measure how much the stage is being tilted.

Mercury Hg is a puzzle-platform game. Similar to its predecessors Archer Maclean's Mercury and Mercury Meltdown, the goal is to navigate a blob of Mercury toward the goalpost by tilting the stage. The player can tilt the stage using the left analog stick in all versions as well as Sixaxis motion controls for the PlayStation 3 version. The camera position can be moved with the right analog stick and music tracks can be changed using the D-pad.

The mercury blob can be split up into multiple blobs using sharp corners and can be remerged by making contact with each other or remerge instantly with a press of a button. However, using the latter method will cost the player a few seconds. The blob of mercury can change color by moving under Paintshops or merging with other blobs of mercury of different colors. Stages feature color-dependent tiles that activate pathways toward goalpost and tiles are blocked by invisible barriers unless the mercury is a specific color.

Across the base game and DLC, there are a total of 120 levels named after chemical elements and organized on a periodic table with the last two being fictional elements due to the periodic table ending at 118. Each level has achievements for completing the stage within the time limit, obtaining all atoms, and finishing with 100% of mercury remaining. All achievements can be obtained individually via multiple playthroughs. Collecting achievements allows the player to unlock bonus levels and challenge levels. In bonus levels, the player starts off with an insufficient amount of mercury and must collect mercury vials scattered across the stage in order to obtain 100% mercury and complete the level. In challenge levels, the player has a set group of levels that must be completed in succession and meet specific goals which vary between Challenge levels. The objectives range from completing set levels within a time limit, gaining a certain amount of mercury, or obtaining a number of collectibles.

Mercury Hg has online leaderboards, ghost racing, the ability to insert music to be played during levels, and the opportunity to share replays.

== Development and release ==
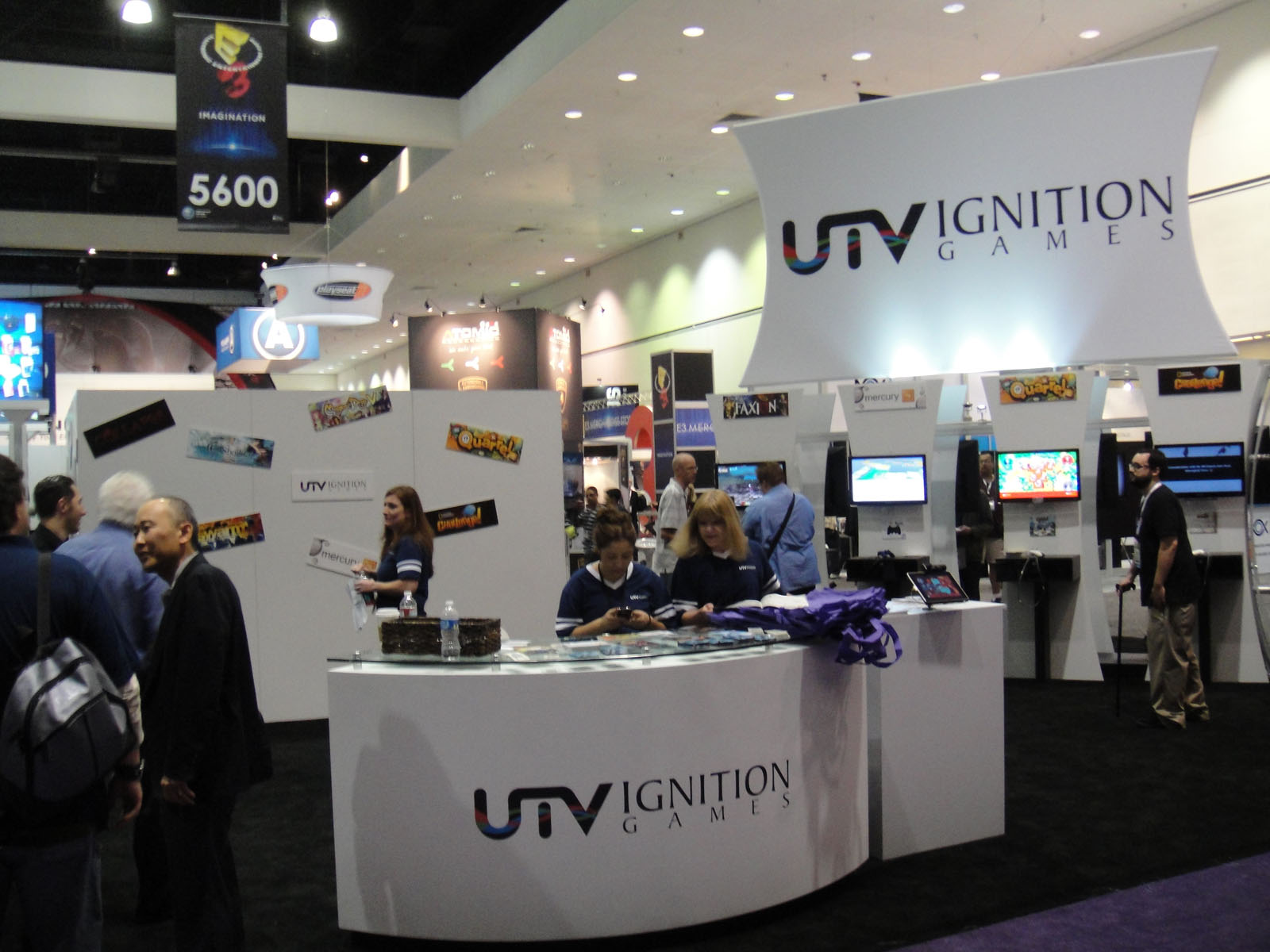
Booth of UTV Ignition Games in E3 2011.

Mercury Hg was developed by a five-man team known collectively as Eiconic Games for the Xbox 360 and PlayStation 3 (PS3). It was announced during E3 2011. Dave Pollard served as co-producer alongside James Boulton, and co-directed the game with Simon Credland. Neal Jones and Graeme Monk served as designers. The music was made by two independent artists: Jilk and Sugar Jesus. UTV Ignition Games approached Eiconic Games based on Graeme Monk's involvement with Archer Maclean's Mercury and due to previous development team, Ignition Banbury, no longer existing. UTV Ignition Games requested the game to be a modernized version of the series and appeal to a wider audience. Credland created the art style, which was inspired by Portal and Wipeout. Developing the game for PlayStation 3 and Xbox 360 allowed Eiconic Games to make the mercury more accurate and behave with superior physics. The title is a play on words for Mercury HD. Eiconic Games tailored the levels to never take more than two minutes to complete, in order to reduce the frustration of players losing a level.

UTV Ignition Games released the game on PlayStation 3 via PlayStation Network on September 27, 2011, in North America, and in Europe the following day. The Xbox 360 version was planned to be released via Xbox Live Arcade worldwide on the same day as the PS3's European release, but was delayed and released on October 19, 2011. Two downloadable content (DLC) packages were released for the game. The first DLC titled "Heavy Elements" was released in North America on the same day as the base game for PS3 and Xbox 360, and contains 45 levels, 10 of them bonus and five challenge. It was later released in Europe on October 19, 2011 for both PS3 and Xbox 360. The second DLC titled "Rare Earth Elements" has the same number of levels as the first DLC, and was released in North America on November 29, 2011, for PS3. The PS3 version was later released in European regions the following day alongside the Xbox 360 version for both North America and Europe.

== Reception ==
Mercury Hg

Aggregate score
Aggregator	Score
Metacritic	74/100

Review scores
Publication	Score
The A.V. Club	A
GamePro	8/10
GameSpot	7/10
GamesRadar+	3.5/5
GameZone	7.5/10
IGN	8/10
Official Xbox Magazine (US)	6.5/10
Machinima	8/10
DigitallyDownloaded.net	4/5

Mercury Hg was well received, scoring 74 out of 100 on Metacritic based on 14 reviews. IGN praised the game as fun and satisfying, particularly appreciating its replay value. GamePro applauded the puzzles for being engaging and calling the game a "fun and breezy diversion". GameSpot highlighted the visual style and periodic table theme as standout elements. PlayStation Official Magazine also praised the theme and design of the game, which they felt gave it a "Truly distinctive feel". Machinima and GamesRadar+ complimented the music customization feature. Official Xbox Magazine noted the game would be more appealing to speedrunners. GameZone highlighted the accuracy of the mercury physics saying it reacts like a real liquid would and that it breaks apart convincingly.

Common criticism among reviewers was the game being too easy and the lack of additional content. Both GameSpot and Official Xbox Magazine criticized the game for lacking the party games from its predecessor, Mercury Meltdown. GamePro was disappointed in the lack of multiplayer and felt the game was more suited to an iOS release. GamesRadar+ criticized the game for not taking full advantage of the premise of controlling mercury, and for the imprecise motion controls of the PS3's DualShock 3 controller. GameZone was also critical of the Sixaxis motion controls and disappointed in the lack of a level creator feature.
