= Jimmy White's Cueball World =

2001 video game

- Developer: Awesome Developments
- Publisher: Virgin Interactive
- Designer: Archer Maclean
- Composer: Frédéric Motte
- Platform: Microsoft Windows
- Release: EU: 14 December 2001
- Genres: Sports (snooker and pool)
- Modes: Single-player, multiplayer

Jimmy White's Cueball World is a sports simulation video game published by Virgin Interactive as the sequel to Jimmy White's 2: Cueball, itself a sequel to Jimmy White's 'Whirlwind' Snooker. The development team once again being led by Archer Maclean, who designed the other two Jimmy White titles. The game was released in December 2001 in Europe, with a North American release was planned to be released a year later by Titus Software under a budget range using the Virgin Interactive brand name. PlayStation 2 and Xbox versions were planned, but were later cancelled.

== Gameplay ==
As well as featuring realistic snooker and pool, there are other minigames featured in Cueball World. Darts returns from the previous title, and alongside darts are new minigames like ball-in-a-maze, and thumb wrestling. Unlike the previous title, where Jimmy White only appeared in the marketing and not in the game itself, Cueball World has Jimmy White appearing in live-action cut scenes that play throughout the game, guiding the player between locations.

A game of blackball played on the Stonehenge table.

The game is played on many themed snooker tables across many areas, such as a traditional Snooker hall, a desert area in the Maldives or an outside area stylized over Stonehenge. As with other entries into the series, the game features "floating hands" that play against the player as the opponent, and also act as the game's referee. These hands will toss for the game's start, and return coloured balls and the cue ball to the table if potted. The game features online and LAN multiplayer.

Featuring three different gamemodes, players can play Pool in the variants 9-ball, US 8-ball, UK 8-ball and 14.1 Continuous; Snooker and English billiards. The game can be played in either top-down and first-person. Shots are made manually, by dragging the mouse in a straight line, similar to games in the Virtual Pool series. More precise control is possible through a number of icons, allowing the player to set power, spin, and cue tilt. Manually chalking is necessary to avoid miscues. A training mode and a trick shot editor are available. The main single player mode consists of consecutive matches against a number of opponents. Beating them unlocks new levels and several sub-games.

== Reception ==
Reception

Aggregate score
| Aggregator | Score |
|---|---|
| GameRankings | 76% |

Review scores
| Publication | Score |
|---|---|
| PC Zone UK | 76% |
| PC Games Germany | 84% |
| GameStar | 78 |
| 4Players | 84% |

Jimmy White's Cueball World received generally average to positive reception from critics. PC Zone UK gave the game a 76/100, and the German review in PC Games scored 84% saying "If snooker legend Jimmy "Whirlwind" White gives his good name for a game, then you can expect a lot." Germany's GameStar scored the game highly at 78% saying "Cueball World plays like the little naughty brother of genre master Virtual Pool 3. The same talent (perfect ball physics), not yet fully grown (less billiard variants, no career mode), but a much younger look and always good for a surprise (billiard basketball)."

PC Invasion declined to score the game, however stated "The idea of knocking balls round some baize stretched across a flat table is back and Mr. White and Cueball World certainly delivers," however, they did cite the game's poor flow saying "The biggest complaint has to be the AI speed, it really could have been cranked up a few gears to keep the game zipping along." German magazine 4players scored the game highly at 83%, saying "The game modes offer plenty of choice, the ball physics is outstanding, the locations are atmospheric and the mini-games offer enough variety from the precise daily routine of cue."

== Sequels ==
Originally announced at E3 in 2001, announcing PC, Xbox and PlayStation 2 releases. Cueball World would be the last entry for the Jimmy White Cueball series. Jimmy White would later put his name to pool video game Pool Paradise. And Jimmy White's Snooker Legend, in 2008.
