= SpeedZone =

SpeedZone may refer to:

- SpeedZone (video game), a 2009 video game
- SpeedZone (amusement park), a family entertainment center franchise
- Speed Zone, a 1989 film
