= Alien Brain =

Alien Brain may refer to:

- Teenage Zombies: Invasion of the Alien Brain Thingys!, a video game
- Alien Brain from Outer Space, episode 4 of Frankenstein Jr. and The Impossibles
- "Mr. Alien Brain Vs. The Skinwalkers", an album by Psychic TV
- The antagonist in X-COM: UFO Defense
