= PQ1 =

PQ1 or variation, may refer to:

- Convoy PQ 1, WWII Allied Arctic Convoy
- Persona Q: Shadow of the Labyrinth, a 2014 video game
- Police Quest: In Pursuit of the Death Angel, 1987 video game
- PQ: Practical Intelligence Quotient, a 2005 video game
- PQ1, a rating used for the UK Royal Mail in Address Point

== See also ==
- PQ (disambiguation)
- PQI (disambiguation)
- PQL (disambiguation)
