= Wheelslip =

Wheelslip may refer to:

- Locomotive wheelslip, railways
- Wheelspin, road vehicles
- Wheelspin (video game), known as SpeedZone in the United States, a futuristic racing video game for Wii
