= PQ2 =

PQ2 or variation, may refer to:

- Convoy PQ 2, WWII Allied Arctic Convoy
- Persona Q2: New Cinema Labyrinth, a 2018 video game
- PQ2: Practical Intelligence Quotient 2, a 2006 video game
- Police Quest II: The Vengeance, a 1988 video game
- PQ2, a rating used for the UK Royal Mail in Address Point

== See also ==
- PQQ (disambiguation)
- PQ (disambiguation)
