= George of the Jungle (disambiguation) =

George of the Jungle is an animated TV series from the 1960s.

George of the Jungle may also refer to:

- George of the Jungle (2007 TV series)
- George of the Jungle (film), a 1997 film based on the 1960s series
- George of the Jungle 2, the sequel to the above film
- George of the Jungle and the Search for the Secret, a video game based on the 2007 series
