= PQQ =

PQQ may refer to:

- Pyrroloquinoline quinone, enzyme cofactor
- Port Macquarie Airport, IATA Airport Code
- Pre-qualification questionnaire, which precedes an invitation to tender

== See also ==
- PQ2 (disambiguation)
