= Nanashi no Game =

2008 video game

- Japanese box art
- Developer: Epics
- Publisher: Square Enix
- Director: Nobuhiko Tenkawa
- Producers: Seiichiro Tsuno; Yosuke Tomita
- Artist: Arata Sakai
- Composer: Masayoshi Soken
- Platform: Nintendo DS
- Release: JP: July 3, 2008
- Genre: Survival horror
- Mode: Single-player

Nanashi no Game (ナナシ ノ ゲエム, Nanashi no Gēmu; lit. "Nameless Game" or "The Game with No Name") is a first-person survival horror video game developed by Epics and published by Square Enix for the Nintendo DS. The game follows a university student who becomes cursed by the role-playing game in the title, which causes people to die in seven days upon starting. It was released on July 3, 2008, in Japan. A sequel, titled Nanashi no Game: Me, was later released on August 27, 2009, in Japan, followed by another sequel in 2012.

== Gameplay ==
The 3D exploration mode in Nanashi no Game. The player holds their DS sideways, so that the touch screen (the player character's forward facing direction) is on the right.

Nanashi no Game involves two separate modes of play. Most of the game takes place in the real world, where the player navigates real-time 3D environments using the DS's D-Pad and Touch Screen. While exploring, the player must solve puzzles and reach locations. The player can switch to the TS Menu at any time, where they can play the cursed game, read e-mail messages, and load a previous save file. In many cases, an e-mail message or update to the cursed game will interrupt the player's exploration. In the cursed game, which only uses the top DS screen, the player controls a 2D 8-bit RPG that provides clues to the current situations and can, in some cases, advance the story.

Partway into the game, the player will encounter Regrets (ルグレ, Rugure), zombie-like spirits that roam the area in exploration mode. If a Regret comes into contact with the player, it is game over. Regrets take several roles in the game, from standing guard at stationary posts to actively chasing (or attempting to scare) the player. In some situations, the cursed game provides clues for bypassing Regrets in a given situation.

== Plot ==
A rumor begins circulating about a nameless, cursed role-playing video game for the fictional Twin Screen (TS) handheld game system. According to the rumor, anyone who plays this "Cursed Game" and does not complete it within seven days will die.

The player assumes the role of a college student at Nanto University, Tokyo. The player began playing the cursed game, sent to them by classmate Odaka, who has been absent recently. Odaka's girlfriend, Riko, requests the player go to his apartment where a horrific discovery is made: Odaka mysteriously died of drowning, with his TS system in his hands. He hadn't sent the game to the player, as he was trying to stop it from "spreading and killing others". The next day, Riko dies on the Nanto Express subway, having received the cursed game six days before the protagonist.

On the player's third day, Nanto University professor Ooyama calls the player to his office. He confirms a "killer curse" is a real possibility, and sees the nameless game as an opportunity to research its mysteries. He directs the player to investigate Jikyuu General Hospital, the abandoned location of the cursed game's domain. The player is directed to look for the medical chart of a man, Yutani, who died in a similar way to Odaka. The player is pursued by eyeless, mouthless spirits, and discovers Riko is one of them. Riko's spirit chases the player out of the hospital after they obtain Yutani's chart and receive a disturbing game update.

On the fourth day, Professor Ooyama and the player learn Yutani was the president of a video game company called Uta-Soft, located on the fourth floor of the Nakano Broadway shopping center. Ooyama directs the player there, warning them to avoid the spirits, which he dubs "Regrets". The player learns Uta-Soft has gone bankrupt, with most of its workers missing and presumed dead. At the abandoned office, the player finds a plan for the unnamed game and an employee roster.

On the fifth day, Ooyama finds only one person from Uta-Soft is still alive: Ushio Ikuta, the creative director of the unnamed game. The player travels to his abandoned residence, where they find a near-catatonic Ikuta in the closet. A game update takes the player into a flashback: Yutani, stressed from work and jealous of Ikuta's love for his family, brutally murdered Ikuta's wife Tomoka while he was at work. Ikuta's daughter Asahi, who hated video games (as they kept her father from spending time with the family), came home to find the bloody scene. She finds Yutani splattered in blood and grinning madly, and is able to escape the house before he attacks her. After the vision, Ikuta utters Asahi's name, and gives the player her picture diary.

On the sixth day, Ooyama explains that Ikuta continued to work on the cancelled game after his wife's death, angering Asahi into running away from home. Based on the diary, Ooyama guesses Asahi may have gone to the cape-side Misaki Hotel, and says he will meet the player there later. When the player finds Asahi's body, she communicates through the game, asking why they came for her despite her attempts to kill them. The player leaves the hotel to meet with Ooyama, but discovers he has turned into a Regret, (most likely from freezing to death). Asahi again communicates to the player, saying her actions were to avenge her mother, and that she will never forgive her father, video games, or the player. Later, a delayed e-mail message from Ooyama asks the player what the drawing in Odaka's apartment stood for. Realizing that it was the Seven Capes Lighthouse located nearby, the player heads there.

On the seventh and last day, the player arrives at the lighthouse. They learn Asahi is the true source of the game's curse, having committed suicide by jumping from the top of the lighthouse. The player heads for the nearby cliff, (depicted many times in the cursed game,) to reach Asahi before daybreak, in 3 minutes. Along the way, they must speak to the now-harmless spirits of the curse, through the cursed game. Ooyama's spirit explains he became a Regret because he wanted to see what would happen if one received the game, but never played it, as he has received the game one day before the player. He now understands Ikuta's reason for working on the nameless game: to prove that video games can be used to show someone love. After talking with Riko, Odaka, and the three missing Uta-Soft employees, the player speaks to Yutani, the curse's first victim. Acknowledging that he was the reason the curse began, (by murdering Asahi's mother), he tells the player to speak with Asahi and help her realize the love she had through her family.

The player shows Asahi the happy memories she shared with her family. Tomoka's spirit appears through the game, telling Asahi she is sad her daughter died, and closed her heart. When Tomoka mentions Ikuta directly, the player finds him standing beside them in the real world, led here by Tomoka's spirit. He explains his good intentions for creating the game, and apologizes to Asahi. In the game, Asahi responds, saying "Papa!" and the scene fades to white, then returns to the player sitting at the cliff. Ikuta notices the player and asks if they have met before. The player confirms this, then asks how the nameless game ends. Ikuta decides to complete the game's story to make amends to his family. The game credits play, revealing the name of the nameless game: "Road to Sunrise."

=== Endings ===
The game has two different endings, depending on whether the player obtained all of the special items found in the nameless game. If the player obtains every item, they will unlock the good ending; otherwise, they receive the bad ending.

- Good Ending: after the nameless game fades to white, Asahi's spirit appears, smiling with gratitude, before she passes on. The player bids her farewell, before Ikuta speaks to them. After the credits, the player receives a message from Asahi—"Thank you."—indicating that her curse has been broken.
- Bad Ending: after the nameless game fades to white, the scene skips directly to the player, who expresses relief that the nightmare is finally over, then Ikuta speaks to them. After the credits, an on-screen message will say "Transfer Complete", implying that the curse has transferred to someone else.

== Development ==
The game's soundtrack was composed by Masayoshi Soken under the pseudonym "Louise Noma" (ルイーズ野間, Ruīzu Noma), a name which in the game refers to the composer for the cursed game's soundtrack. On 7 July 2008, Square Enix released a five-track EP of music from Nanashi no Game titled Nanashi no Game Sound (ナナシ ノ ゲエム 音, Nanashi no Gēmu On).

As of September 30, 2008, Nanashi no Game has sold 60,000 copies in Japan.

== Reception ==
Reception

Review scores
Publication	Score
Famitsu	30/40
Cubed3	9/10

Nanashi no Game received positive reviews from critics, receiving a score of 30/40 by Famitsu magazine.

== Sequels and spin-offs ==
Nanashi no Game: Me
- Developer: Epics
- Publisher: Square Enix
- Series: Nanashi no Game
- Platform: Nintendo DS
- Release: JP: August 27, 2009
- Genre: Survival horror
- Mode: Single-player

Nanashi no Game: Me (ナナシ ノ ゲエム 目, Nanashi no Gēmu Me; lit. "Nameless Game: Eye") is a survival horror video game for the Nintendo DS, and the sequel to the original Nanashi no Game. It was developed by Epics, published by Square Enix, and released on August 27, 2009, in Japan. The story follows an anthropology student from Nanto University, as he discovers two cursed games, an RPG and a platformer. The game's title refers to the protagonist's left eye, represented by the left screen of the DS when held sideways, which allows the player to see things left (and hidden) by the curse. It sold 15,000 copies on the week of its release.

Much like in the original, Nanashi no Game: Me involves two separate modes of play. Most of the game takes place in the real world, where the player navigates real-time 3D environments using the DS's D-Pad and Touch Screen. While exploring, the player must solve puzzles and reach locations. The player can switch to the TS Menu at any time, where they can play the cursed game, read e-mail messages, and load a previous save file. In many cases, an e-mail message or update to the cursed game will interrupt the player's exploration. In the cursed game, which only uses the top DS screen, the player controls a 2D 8-bit RPG that provides clues to the current situations and can, in some cases, advance the story. In Nanashi no Game: Me, the player can now choose the locations they want to explore out of the two available for each day (for three days only). Each destination provides different experiences, including the Regrets the player will encounter.

Two spin-off DSiWare titles, named Noroi no Game: Chi (ノロイ ノ ゲエム 血, Noroi no Gēmu Chi; lit. "Cursed Game: Blood") and Noroi no Game: Oku (ノロイ ノ ゲエム 獄, Noroi no Gēmu Oku; lit. "Cursed Game: Prison") respectively, have also been released on 9 September 2009.

Another sequel, Nanashi no Appli (ナナシ ノ 或プリ, Nanashi no Apuri; lit. "Nameless App"), was released on 26 January 2012 for iOS, and in February 2012 for Android.
