= Jimmy White's 'Whirlwind' Snooker =

1991 video game

- Publisher: Virgin Games
- Designer: Archer Maclean
- Composers: Michael Powell; Allister Brimble (Mega Drive)
- Platforms: Amiga, Atari ST, MS-DOS, Mega Drive
- Release: 1991; November 1994 (Mega Drive)
- Genre: Sports (snooker)
- Modes: Single-player, multiplayer

Jimmy White's 'Whirlwind' Snooker is a video game designed and produced by Archer Maclean, released by Virgin Games in 1991 for the Amiga, Atari ST, and IBM PC compatibles (later for the Mega Drive). A port for the Atari Lynx was planned but never released. 'Whirlwind' Snooker is a realistic snooker simulator.

Although the game was not the first to simulate snooker (or pool) in 3D, it used the processing power and graphics capabilities of 16-bit home computers and was praised for its then ground-breaking realism and easy-to-use interface. ACE said that the game was the closest thing to being on a real snooker table which existed at the time, and it could be used by a player to refine real-life snooker skills.

== Gameplay ==
A red ball taunts the player.

The sound effect used for a successful pot was a resounding "pop" (regardless of the speed at which the ball reached the pocket) and numerous animations provided comic relief should a player take more than a few seconds to shoot. Balls would sprout eyeballs and arms, making faces at the player or holding up signs that read "Get on with it!" and such.

Also present is an extensive trick shot editor, featuring a number of pre-set table arrangements with instructions on how they should be played. An easter egg enabled the option to watch the computer player complete a maximum break. The game's title music was similar to (and probably intended to pay homage to) that of snooker TV programme Pot Black.

The game uses a copy protection mechanism in which the user is prompted to enter a word from the manual corresponding to a certain page, paragraph and word number. Getting this word wrong three times caused the word FAIL to appear over the screen many times (after which, in the MS-DOS version, the computer was rebooted).

== Development ==
The game took Maclean several years to complete; the billiard ball physics alone taking several months of programming. One of the reasons why the game runs as quickly as it does is the way in which each shot is played. The next shot is effectively pre-played while the white ball is being cued – the position and movement of each ball being calculated frame-by-frame and kept in a list in memory.

Each frame of the next shot is then displayed by rendering each ball from this list, frame-by-frame, instead of rendering it in real-time. Maclean also explained that a closed environment like a snooker table allowed certain optimizations that would not be possible in 3D games such as Elite.

== Release ==
Following the game's release, Virgin launched a nationwide tournament in the UK. Regional heats were held at Virgin's stores; the eventual winner went on to challenge Maclean himself in the first series of Channel 4's GamesMaster with snooker pro Jimmy White commentating. The game itself would also appear on two further episodes of GamesMaster, with John Parrott appearing on the second series, and Jimmy White himself playing the game in Series 4.

== Reception ==
Reception

Aggregate score
Aggregator	Score
GameRankings	Mega Drive: 80%

Review scores
Publication	Score
Mean Sega Machines	92%
Sega Power	80%
Sega Pro (UK)	92%
Ultimate Future Games (UK)	91%

Reception for the game was generally positive. UK magazine Mean Sega Machines scored the game highly, with 92%, particularly enjoying the game's pick-up and play controls, and the accurate portrayal of snooker, saying "JWWS brings simulation into the 90s, and is destined to be the benchmark other sims are measured by."

In 1994, PC Gamer UK named Whirlwind Snooker the 37th best computer game of all time. In 2017, GamesRadar ranked the game 45th on their "Best Sega Genesis/Mega Drive games of all time."

== Legacy ==
The game was followed by Archer Maclean's Pool in 1992, Jimmy White's 2: Cueball in 1999 and Jimmy White's Cueball World in 2001.
