= PQL =

PQL, pql, or variation, may refer to:

- Trent Lott International Airport (FAA id: PQL), Pascagoula, Jackson County, Mississippi, US
- The Porcupine's Quill, a publishing company based in Erie, Ontario, Canada
- Project Quantum Leap, a fictional time travel project from the TV series Quantum Leap

== See also ==
- PQI (disambiguation)
- PQ1 (disambiguation)
