= PQI =

PQI may refer to:

- Presque Isle International Airport, IATA airport code
- Print Quality Improvement, data exchange format of Advanced Photo System
- Predictive Quantities Indicator, used for College and university rankings
- Pittsburgh Quantum Institute

== See also ==
- PQ1 (disambiguation)
- PQL (disambiguation)
