= Philosoma =

1995 video game

- North American cover art
- Developer: G-Artists (Note: Sony Computer Entertainment Japan assisted on development.)
- Publisher: Sony Computer Entertainment
- Composer: Kow Otani
- Platform: PlayStation
- Release: JP: July 28, 1995; NA: January 30, 1996; PAL: March 1996
- Genre: Shooter
- Mode: Single-player

Philosoma (Note: Japanese: フィロソマ, Hepburn: Philosoma) is a shooter video game developed by G-Artists and published by Sony Computer Entertainment for the PlayStation. It was released in Japan in July 1995, North America in January 1996 and PAL territories in March 1996. It was re-released on the PlayStation Network in Japan on April 26, 2007. One of the earliest PlayStation games, it was met with mediocre reviews, with most critics assessing its graphics as dull and its gameplay as primitive.

== Story ==
A recently colonized alien planet named Planet 220 reports a devastating attack by an unknown force and requires assistance. Alpha and Bravo teams are called in, but after enemy contact is made, the team fails to respond. The player assumes the roles of D3, a rookie pilot, as well as his commander and Charlie squadron Commander Nicolard Michau. Each are piloting the latest space fighter ships, the F/A-37 Strega, in an attempt to neutralize the unknown threat. However, a horrible secret hidden in the battle awaits them.

== Gameplay ==
Philosoma plays like many scrolling shooters with the noticeable difference of its multiple perspectives. The camera switches several times during various levels from a vertical/top-down perspective to a rail shooter perspective (which is often reversed), to a horizontal scrolling perspective and an isometric scrolling perspective. The player ships have four weapons that can be upgraded thrice as well as side-arms consisting of homing missiles and rockets.

== Development and release ==
Philosoma was one of the first games announced for the PlayStation. It suffered a prolonged development cycle with its release date being pushed back multiple times, before finally appearing in Japan at the end of June 1995. The game was released for the PlayStation in Japan on July 28, 1995.

== Reception ==
Reception

Review scores
Publication	Score
AllGame	4/5
Edge	5/10
Electronic Gaming Monthly	8.5/10, 8/10, 8/10, 8/10
EP Daily	6/10
Famitsu	7/10, 7/10, 8/10, 5/10
Game Players	65%
GameFan	85/100, 90/100, 84/100
GameRevolution	C
IGN	5/10
Next Generation	2/5
Play	85%
Dengeki PlayStation	65/100, 50/100, 70/100, 50/100
Maximum	2/5
Ultimate Future Games	49%
VideoGames	7/10

Philosoma garnered a mixed reception from critics. GamePro's Lawrence Neves criticized the primitive gameplay, saying that "Philosoma tries hard to be a next-gen shooter, but in gameplay it barely surpasses Novastorm." He further remarked that while the FMVs are impressive, the graphics which are most important to the shooter experience - the backgrounds, explosions, and enemies - are all dull. He nonetheless gave the game a mild recommendation for shooter fans. Next Generation deemed the game a worthwhile purchase for shooter fans but no one else: "The graphics and sound really do nothing to take advantage of the advancing technology. If you want the next great experience in gameplay and graphics, Philosoma wouldn't even make a top 75 list. ... Still, there's plenty of explosions, balanced gameplay, fluid control, timely power-ups, and multiple weapon choices to keep any shooter fan happy". Maximum's Richard Leadbetter found the FMVs impressive but said that the "gameplay [harks] back to an archaic age". Leadbetter concluded that even the retro release Gradius Deluxe Pack is a far better purchase. Philosoma was awarded Best Shooter of 1995 by Electronic Gaming Monthly.

== Sequel ==
In 2001, a sequel was released in Japan only for the PlayStation 2 called Phase Paradox. However, it was only a sequel in terms of it being a continuation of the storyline from Philosoma; the game was in the survival horror genre instead of a shooter genre.
