= Tornado (2008 video game) =

- Developer: SKONEC Entertainment
- Publisher: Ignition Entertainment
- Platform: Nintendo DS
- Release: NA: October 27, 2008; EU: February 27, 2009
- Genre: Action
- Mode: Single-player

Tornado is a video game for the Nintendo DS handheld gaming system, developed by South Korean studio SKONEC Entertainment and published by Ignition Entertainment. The game tasks the player as Toki, a member of the Cosmic Cleaner, who must replace all of Earth's items which have been stolen by a character known only as the "Prince". Players do this by following him to Planet 69 and using a "tornado machine" to uproot all the items that the prince has stolen. The game makes use of both the stylus and microphone of the DS system.

== Reception ==
Reception

Aggregate score
Aggregator	Score
Metacritic	44/100

Review scores
Publication	Score
4Players	15%
GamesMaster	50%
GameSpot	4.5/10
GamesRadar+	2/5
GamesTM	2/10
NGamer	61%
Nintendo Power	6/10
Official Nintendo Magazine	70%
Pocket Gamer	2/5
VideoGamer.com	3/10

The game received "generally unfavorable reviews" according to the review aggregation website Metacritic.

== See also ==
- Tornado Outbreak, a similarly-themed video game released on contemporary consoles
