= Red Bull BC One (video game) =

2008 video game

- Developer(s): Smack Down Productions
- Publisher(s): EU: Playlogic Entertainment; NA: Ignition Entertainment
- Platform(s): Nintendo DS
- Release: FRA: July 25, 2008; EU: August 28, 2008; NA: September 16, 2008
- Genre(s): Rhythm game
- Mode(s): Single-player

Red Bull BC One is a rhythm game developed by Smack Down Productions and published by Playlogic Entertainment and Ignition Entertainment for Nintendo DS in 2008. The game is based on the Red Bull BC One breakdancing competition organized by the energy drink company Red Bull.

== Reception ==
Reception

Aggregate score
Aggregator	Score
Metacritic	48/100

Review scores
Publication	Score
GameRevolution	D−
GamesMaster	55%
IGN	5.6/10
Jeuxvideo.com	9/20
NGamer	32%
Official Nintendo Magazine	80%

The game received "generally unfavorable reviews" according to the review aggregation website Metacritic.
