= PQ3 =

PQ3 or variation, may refer to:

- Convoy PQ 3, WWII Allied Arctic Convoy
- Police Quest III: The Kindred, a 1991 video game
- PQ3, a rating used for the UK Royal Mail in Address Point
- PQ3, a post-quantum cryptographic protocol for securing iMessage from Apple Inc.

== See also ==
- PQ (disambiguation)
