= Return to PopoloCrois =

2015 video game

Return to PoPoLoCrois: A Story of Seasons Fairytale
- North American cover art
- Developers: Epics; Marvelous
- Publisher: Marvelous: NA: Xseed Games
- Director: Munekazu Matsuyoshi
- Producer: Yoshifumi Hashimoto
- Writer: Shuji Nomaguchi
- Composers: Tetsuo Ishikawa; Yoshiyuki Sahashi
- Series: PopoloCrois; Story of Seasons
- Platform: Nintendo 3DS
- Release: JP: June 18, 2015; PAL: February 18, 2016; NA: March 1, 2016
- Genres: Farm simulation, role-playing
- Mode: Single-player

Return to PopoloCrois: A Story of Seasons Fairytale, known in Japan as PoPoLoCrois: Bokujō Monogatari (ポポロクロイス牧場物語, PoPoRoKuroisu Bokujō Monogatari), is a 2015 farming simulation role-playing game developed by Epics and Marvelous and published by Marvelous for the Nintendo 3DS video game system. It is a crossover between Epics and Sony Computer Entertainment's Popolocrois and Marvelous' Story of Seasons series. Despite Sony's ownership of the series, it was not released on any PlayStation console.

== Plot ==
The game begins with a recap of the first series. During Pietro's birthday, he pays a visit to Narcia, but finds that she isn't available. Marmela, a representative from a distant land called Galariland, arrives and informs the group of black beasts that have been threatening both lands. Pietro later has a private meeting with Narcia. The next day, Pietro decides to visit Galariland to deal with the monsters. As Marmela prepares a magic circle to teleport him there, she is revealed to be a dark sorceress who works for the evil deity Gryphot and sends Pietro to her lair: the Dark Tower. There, her siblings Parmela and Dew attempt to transform him into a black beast, but a charm stops their efforts. Gomer, a friend of Pietro's, is revealed to be a spy working for Marmela. They decide to imprison Pietro for the time being, but he escapes with the help of a blue wolf and Gomer, who isn't completely loyal to Marmela. In the forest, he meets Nino and Rue, two brothers who own a farm. They provide Pietro with a farm of his own, which is inhabited by a fairy named Connie. A deity named Galariel requests for him to restore the four Farms of Light in Galariland in order to revive her and return to Popolocrois. The blue wolf, Connie, Nino, and Rue all join him on his journey. They are later joined by White Knight and GamiGami, who also ended up in Galariland after being tricked by Marmela. After two farms are restored, Parmela sets a trap to again try to turn Pietro into a black beast, but is foiled by the blue wolf, who is revealed to be Narcia, who turned into a wolf after following Pietro to Galariland. Narcia was also revealed to be the one responsible for the charm that made Pietro immune to Parmela's first attempt to transform him into a black beast. With her plan foiled, Parmela retreats. Pietro brings Narcia to a spring owned by Galariel to heal Narcia and turn her back to normal. Once all the farms are restored and Galariel is revived, the group raid the Dark Tower. They rescue Gomer, who was imprisoned for helping Pietro escape, and defeat Parmela at the top. Afterwards, Galariel transports the group to Popolocrois. Using a magical branch that Galariel gave them, they remove the barrier around the castle and confront Marmela. Once they defeat her, they confront Dew in the next room, who is then devoured by Gryphot. The group defeat him with Galariel's help. With the threat now over, Galariel gives Pietro and Nino magical seeds before she, Nino, and Rue return to Galariland. Sometime later, Pietro plants the seeds, which grows into a plant that produces a magic circle leading to Galariland, allowing him to revisit anytime he wants.

== Reception ==
Reception

Aggregate score
Aggregator	Score
Metacritic	72/100

Review scores
Publication	Score
Destructoid	7/10
Famitsu	31/40
GameZone	(favorable)
Hardcore Gamer	4/5
Nintendo Life	9/10
Nintendo World Report	7.5/10
Polygon	6.5/10
RPGamer	3/5
RPGFan	75%

The game received "mixed or average reviews" according to the review aggregation website Metacritic.

James Cunningham of Hardcore Gamer said, "While it takes a bit to get all its gameplay elements into place, Return to PopoloCrois: A Story of Seasons Fairy Tale is thoroughly charming from the very start." Chris Carter of Destructoid said, "The core story is roughly 30 hours or so, but you can mess around with all of the side content and the farming aspect for far beyond that, which is a perfect excuse to spend weeks on end with a portable." In Japan, Famitsu gave it a score of 31 out of 40.
