= Zoo Keeper (2003 video game) =

- North American Nintendo DS box art
- Developers: Robot Communications; Success (GBA, PS2, DS)
- Publishers: JP: Robot Communications Success (GBA, PS2, DS); WW: Ignition Entertainment; EU: 505 Game Street (PS2)
- Platforms: Web browser, Arcade, Game Boy Advance, PlayStation 2, Nintendo DS, Nintendo 3DS, iOS, Android
- Release: October 31, 2003: Game Boy Advance; JP: October 31, 2003; EU: August 4, 2005 PS2; JP: February 12, 2004; EU: August 2004 Nintendo DS; JP: December 2, 2004; NA: January 18, 2005; EU: March 11, 2005 iOS; WW: June 10, 2011 Android; WW: November 25, 2011 Nintendo 3DS; JP: January 26, 2012
- Genre: Puzzle
- Modes: Single-player, multiplayer

Zoo Keeper is a tile-matching video game originally developed and published by Robot Communications for browsers. It was later ported to the Game Boy Advance, PlayStation 2, and Nintendo DS by Success, which remains its best-known incarnation. Zoo Keeper was released for arcades in 2004. The game was then brought to American and European shores by Ignition Entertainment, and has since been released for iOS and Android devices under the title Zookeeper DX Touch Edition by Kiteretsu.

In Japan, before the release for Nintendo DS, Success released this game with alternative name Zooo. The PlayStation 2 version of this game was later released in Europe by 505 Game Street as Zoo Puzzle.

== Gameplay ==
Nintendo DS screenshot

The objective of Zoo Keeper is to remove the animal tiles that fill up the screen by aligning three or more in a row or column. Levels end when a pre-determined number of each animal tile has been removed. These quotas are listed underneath each animal symbol.

Tiles are aligned by swapping ones adjacent to each other. If this causes a line of three or more matching tiles to form, the tiles stay in their new position and the matching tiles are removed. If no line of three or more matching tiles is formed the tiles revert to their original position. Lines can be horizontal or vertical, and combinations can cause many lines to disappear at the same time. When tiles disappear, any tiles above them on the screen fall down to fill the space. If this results in a further line of three, this line also disappears. This is called a 'chain'. An example of a chain can be seen in the screenshot: making a line of (green) crocodiles in the centre of the screen will cause the crocodiles to disappear, and the (red) gorillas will meet to make a line of three.

One important aspect that sets Zoo Keeper apart from Bejeweled and its many clones is the ability to switch tiles while another move is still 'in progress'. This allows the player to set up chains, or to 'fake' chains by creating multiple rows of three in quick succession.

If no moves are available the screen is reset, but the clock keeps ticking. Similarly, while chains are formed after a level is cleared the clock continues, though the player is locked out from playing. A key challenge when playing Zoo Keeper is the inability to find a valid move, which players know must exist (otherwise the screen would be reset). To combat this, players can use the "binoculars" tool to show the position of any unmade moves.

At any time during the game, a Special Panel may appear. This is a tile which quickly flicks through all animal types giving it a flashing effect. Tapping on this tile will cause it to stop on one of the animals and all tiles of this type will be instantly removed from the screen. A rare phenomenon is where a row of three Special Panels is made. The result is a rainbow-like animation of the tiles and the word 'Revolution' appearing on the screen. 1,000,000 bonus points are rewarded when this happens.

On the DS version of the game, as shown in the screenshot, the upper screen shows a favourite animal, for which captures generate increased points. It utilises touch screen operation and the opportunity to battle another DS owner. Other versions allow two players to play at once on one screen.

== Modes ==
=== Zoo Keeper ===
Zoo Keeper mode sets a quota of animal tiles to remove in order to advance a level. This quota starts at three animals. As play progresses, this quota increases, while the time limit to meet the quota decreases.

=== Tokoton ===
Tokoton is similar to the main mode, but the quota is set at 100 animals. In addition, the player is not required to catch 100 of every animal, but instead 100 of just one type. When 100 elephants, for example, are captured, the screen clears and the points awarded for each cleared tile are increased. The counter for elephants is reset to zero, but the counters for all other animals remain as they are. Therefore, it is common to increase by a few levels in a short period of time.

=== Quest ===
This mode consists of ten stages, where the Curator of the zoo sets certain challenges. These challenges are:

- capture 20 lions (while capturing as few other animals as possible)
- capture 15 more giraffes than pandas (or 15 more pandas than giraffes)
- create thirty chains
- capture each animal only once
- pick a flashing multiplier or bonus
- move a flashing tile to the bottom of the screen
- capture seven times without chaining
- capture a group of four or more animals five times
- capture ten vertical lines (while capturing as few horizontal lines as possible)
- fill the timer

This mode has attracted much criticism, as the randomness of the challenges and reward system mean that progressing is as much a matter of luck as it is of skill. In particular, in reference to the seventh challenge, Stuart Campbell wrote in his review that the game doesn't take into account that the random new items filling the places of the captured animals can inadvertently generate new captures, making the player's challenge impossible.

=== Time Attack ===
This mode is the same as the main game, but with a time limit of six minutes. The quotas needed for each level are reduced.

=== Super Hard Mode ===
Initially, players can choose to play on 'easy', 'medium' or 'hard' difficulties. These difficulties give higher points values to each game type. Super Hard Mode is unlocked by placing top in each of the previous modes' high score tables.
