= Blade Dancer: Lineage of Light =

2006 video game

- European box art
- Developer: Hit Maker (Note: Additional work by Sony Computer Entertainment Japan.)
- Publishers: JP: Sony Computer Entertainment; NA: NIS America; EU: Ignition Entertainment
- Platform: PlayStation Portable
- Release: JP: March 2, 2006; NA: July 18, 2006; EU: February 9, 2007; AU: March 22, 2007
- Genre: Role-playing video game
- Modes: Single-player, Multiplayer

Blade Dancer: Lineage of Light, released in Japan as Blade Dancer: Thousand-Year Promise (Note: Japanese: ブレイドダンサー 千年の約束, Hepburn: Bureido Dansā Sennen no Yakusoku), is a role-playing video game developed by Hit Maker and published by Sony Computer Entertainment for the PlayStation Portable. It was released in March 2006 in Japan, July 2006 in North America by NIS America and PAL territories in 2007 by Ignition Entertainment. Players take on the role of the boy Lance who must save the world with the help of his friends.

It was released for the PlayStation 4 and PlayStation 5 on May 16, 2023.

== Gameplay ==
Blade Dancer is a role-playing video game. Combat is turn-based like most games in the genre, with Lance leading a party with four characters at maximum. Lunabilities are skills that can be utilized to deal high damage or debuffs to enemies. Weapons and items can be crafted by combining various items.

== Reception ==
Reception

Aggregate score
Aggregator	Score
Metacritic	60/100

Review scores
Publication	Score
Electronic Gaming Monthly	3.17/10
Eurogamer	6/10
Famitsu	26/40
Game Informer	5.5/10
GameRevolution	C
GameSpot	6.8/10
GameSpy	3/5
GameTrailers	6.6/10
GameZone	6.9/10
IGN	6.5/10
Official U.S. PlayStation Magazine	2/5

The game received "mixed" reviews according to the review aggregation website Metacritic. In Japan, Famitsu gave it a score of two sevens and two sixes for a total of 26 out of 40. Rob Fahey of Eurogamer noted that while the game's combat and crafting system was well done, he considered the game to be mediocre for its uninspired design and overuse of role-playing game clichés.
