= PopoloCrois =

Japanese manga series

ポポロクロイス物語 (Poporokuroisu monogatari)
- Manga
- Written by: Yohsuke Tamori
- Published by: The Asahi Shimbun Company
- Magazine: The Asahi Shimbun Student Newspaper
- Published: October 1984
- Novel

PopoloChronicle
- Written by: Yohsuke Tamori
- Illustrated by: Atsuko Fukushima
- Published by: Kaiseisha
- Published: February 18, 2015
- Novel

PopoloChronicle 2
- Written by: Yohsuke Tamori
- Illustrated by: Atsuko Fukushima
- Published by: Kaiseisha
- Published: December 23, 2018
- Novel

Maya Mensis Aureos
- Written by: Yohsuke Tamori
- Illustrated by: Atsuko Fukushima
- Published by: Kaiseisha
- Published: December 10, 2013
- Video game
- Developer: epics (G-Artists), Sugar & Rockets
- Publisher: Sony Interactive Entertainment
- Genre: Role-playing video game
- Platform: PlayStation, PlayStation 2, PlayStation Portable, PlayStation Network, Nintendo 3DS
- Released: PopoloCrois Story: JP: July 12, 1996; JP: September 27, 2007 (PSN); Poporogue: JP: November 26, 1998; PopoloCrois Story II: JP: January 27, 2000; JP: December 26, 2007 (PSN); PopoloCrois: Adventure of Beginnings: JP: June 20, 2002; PopoloCrois: Adventure of the Law of the Moon: JP: March 18, 2004; PopoloCrois (PSP): JP: February 10, 2005; NA: December 6, 2005; EU: June 16, 2006; AU: June 30, 2006; Return to PopoloCrois: A Story of Seasons Fairytale: JP: June 18, 2015; EU: February 18, 2016; NA: March 1, 2016
- Related works
- Popolocrois (anime)

PopoloCrois (ポポロクロイス物語, Poporokuroisu Monogatari) is a fantasy media franchise created by Yohsuke Tamori (1951-2026) and owned by Sony Interactive Entertainment. It originated as a manga series in 1977 in the Asahi Student Newspaper (a subsidiary of the Asahi Shimbun newspaper). Its title, pronounced (PO-po-lo-croyce), is a combination of words from two languages: the Italian word "Popolo (people)" and the French "croisé (crossing)", which together mean "crossing of people". The franchise is geared towards a young Japanese audience, with the general theme of the series being love, compassion and racial equality. The franchise consists of a manga series, role-playing video games, two anime series in 1998 and 2003 and a series of novels.

== History ==
PopoloCrois was first published in November 1978 in the women's magazine Pafu (ぱふ). In October 1984 the cartoon was published in the Asahi Shimbun Student Newspaper, which is considered the official start of the PoPoLoCrois series.

In 2013, Yohsuke Tamori and Atsuko Fukushima teamed up to create spin-offs Popolocrois novel called Maya Mensis Aureos that was published by Kaiseisha; it is ended as a trilogy.

Yohsuke Tamori died on April 10, 2026 at the age of 74.

== Video games ==
Cover of the original 1996 PlayStation video game adaptation

Years after the manga had ended distribution, Tamori sold the series to Sony Computer Entertainment, who released a series of role-playing video games based on the manga, developed by G-Artists for the PlayStation. The first video game was revealed in May 1994 together with Sony's new PlayStation, with a release for spring 1995. However it was not released until July of 1996. Famitsu magazine scored it 31 out of 40. In 2022, the game was fan translated into English. The second game, Poporogue, was released in 1998, and the direct sequel PoPoLoCrois Monogatari II was released in 2000. PoPoLoCrois Monogatari II was fan translated into English in 2024 and Poporogue in 2025. On June 20, 2002, Sony Computer Entertainment released PopoloCrois: Adventure of Beginnings (ポポロクロイス ～はじまりの冒険～, PoPoLoCrois: Hajimari no Bouken) for PlayStation 2, followed by Popolocrois: Adventure of the Law of the Moon (ポポロクロイス～月の掟の冒険～, Popolocrois: Tsuki no Okite no Bouken) on March 18, 2004.

The 2005 PlayStation Portable game remixes both the first two games into one, and was also the first PopoloCrois to be released overseas that year and in 2006. In 2015, a crossover with the Story of Seasons series of games was released worldwide as Return to PopoloCrois: A Story of Seasons Fairytale, it unusually released for a Nintendo console despite Sony's ownership of the series. A prequel novel PopoloChronicle taking place before the events of the first game was also released.

While random and turn-based, battles take on a form very similar to console strategy RPGs (such as Final Fantasy Tactics). When a character's turn begins, they can move along a small grid and attack enemies from four cardinal directions, each with their own advantages and disadvantages. For example, an attack to the enemy's back will deal more damage, as will skipping a turn to focus on the next turn.

The main character is the prince of the PopoloCrois kingdom, Pietro. The first game, PopoloCrois Monogatari, starts on the night of Pietro's 10th birthday, when he learns that his mother, who he thought was long dead, was found in a coma. Pietro sets out into a journey along with the apprentice forest witch Narcia to save his mother's soul from the underworld.

=== Characters ===
- Pietro is very caring and values friendship, and he gets more courageous as the game progresses. Pietro has a crush on Narcia ever since they had their first adventure together. Pietro finds out that he is part dragon because his mother Queen Sania is a dragon.
- Narcia is an apprentice forest witch who helps Pietro in the game. Narcia wears a pink dress with a two pointed hat for a specific purpose; when she is 15 years old, she begins to wear a semi purple and pink dress.
- Kai is Narcia's shapeshifting alter ego. Guilda gave her the treasure of the forest witches: the Golden Key which allowed her to become a human so she wouldn't turn into bubbles if she came in contact with seawater; but if anyone discovered this secret, she would fall into a coma. At first she tricks Pietro and the White Knight into thinking that she's a friend of Narcia's, but she reveals her secret to Pietro by accident and later Kimendoji.
- White Knight is first met by Pietro and Narcia at the same time Naguro is met. He joins the party and stays until the very end of book one, Ice Demon. He then rejoins the party when Pietro, Don and Gon go the mine in Pasela to find a dragon in there, but leaves after a baby dragon imprints on him. He stays behind in the land of dragons to help the baby get used to living there.
- GamiGami Devil is a slightly unbalanced dwarf who, though unable to read or write above the level of a child, is a technical genius who creates robots and vast cities.
- Ice Demon is the ruler of North Land and master of ice magic. In the past, he attacked Popolocrois, but was stopped and defeated by a dragon.

=== Story ===
The main character is the prince of the PopoloCrois kingdom, Pietro. The first game, PopoloCrois Monogatari, starts at the night of Pietro's 10th birthday, when he learns that his mother, who he thought was long dead, was found in a coma. Pietro sets out into a journey along with the apprentice forest witch Narcia to save his mother's soul from the underworld.

There are two more games continuing the tales of Pietro and company. The second game, Poporogue (portmanteau of PopoloCrois + Epilogue), features Pietro as a 12-year-old boy that went off to save his father from the dream world that he was forced into. The third, PopoloCrois Monogatari II, features Pietro and Narcia as 15-year-olds with different costumes, who went off to defeat the mysterious force that was going to destroy the world. PopoloCrois Monogatari II was the most famous game of the series, due to the darkened story, new party members, and many other features. The PSP release is a reproduction of PopoloCrois Monogatari (included into Book 1) and PopoloCrois Monogatari II (included into Book 3), with Book 2 being a brand-new scenario.
