= Archer Maclean's Pool =

1992 video game

- Publisher: Virgin Games
- Designer: Archer Maclean
- Composer: Michael Powell
- Platforms: Amiga, Atari ST, MS-DOS
- Release: 1992
- Genre: Sports (pool)
- Modes: Single-player, multiplayer

Archer Maclean's Pool is a video game designed and produced by Archer Maclean, published by Virgin Games in 1992 for Amiga, Atari ST and MS-DOS.

== Gameplay ==
The sequel of sorts to Jimmy White's 'Whirlwind' Snooker, the game replaces the snooker theme of the predecessor game with that of pool.

== See also ==
- Jimmy White's 'Whirlwind' Snooker
