= PQ International =

UK magazine

PQ International is a magazine about polo. The magazine went online in 2014.

== Overview ==
PQ International was founded in 1992 by Heinz Dorler Its offices are located in Ascot, Berkshire, England. The magazine had a circulation of 43,000 copies. Formerly, its editors were Roger Chatterton-Newman Heinz’ wife continued to run PQ after his death Andria lawrence. She further grew the editorial offering adding diversity within its content including Fashion, Beauty and lifestyle editorial led by PR CEO of B. The Communications Agency Sally-Anne Stevens (nee Shrimpton) It is published by PoloLine. In 2014 the print edition of PQ International folded and the magazine became a digital publication., after 1 year of Online publication the magazine went back to its original print edition
