= Mercury Meltdown =

2006 video game

- North American PlayStation Portable box art
- Developer: Ignition Banbury
- Publisher: Ignition Entertainment: JP: Sony Computer Entertainment
- Designers: Rich Hancock; Mark Walden
- Platforms: PlayStation Portable, PlayStation 2, Wii
- Release: PSP: AU: 28 September 2006; NA: 3 October 2006; EU: 6 October 2006; PlayStation 2: EU: 30 November 2006; NA: 4 December 2006; Wii: AU: 26 March 2007; EU: 8 June 2007; NA: 17 October 2007
- Genre: Puzzle-platform
- Modes: Single-player, multiplayer

Mercury Meltdown is a 2006 puzzle-platform video game developed by Ignition Banbury and published by Ignition Entertainment for the PlayStation Portable. Sony Computer Entertainment. It is the sequel to Archer Maclean's Mercury. Like the first game, the goal is to tilt the stage to navigate one or more blobs of mercury to the destination. In contrast to the original, Ignition Banbury had more time and experience developing the game and listened to player feedback. This allowed the game to be easier and provided players with more freedom to choose levels. The game has new hazards, enemies, and mini games.

The game received a port to the PlayStation 2 (PS2) titled Mercury Meltdown Remix released a month after the original, with improved graphics, new levels, and optimization for the PS2's controller. A second port for the Wii titled Mercury Meltdown Revolution was released in 2007 and also changed the levels, improving the graphics further from the Remix version and making use of Wii's motion controls.

All versions of Mercury Meltdown were well received by critics. The game was praised for being an overall improvement from the original in terms of difficulty and art style. Mercury Meltdown Remix received mixed reviews in regards to the PS2 controls with criticism of removing multiplayer. Mercury Meltdown Revolution was also criticized for its lack of multiplayer, but was praised for its use of the Wii's motion controls.

== Gameplay ==
Gameplay of Mercury Meltdown. The mercury in a solid state allows it to be moved on rails. A new color-mixing chart is featured in the top right corner.

Similar to its predecessor, Mercury Meltdown is a puzzle-platform game. The goal is to navigate blobs of mercury to one or more finish points by tilting the stage with the analog stick of the PSP. The stage is failed if all mercury is lost or the amount of mercury drops below the minimum requirement to complete the stage. However, running out of time no longer causes the stage to be failed, since the time limit has been retooled as "Par Time", which simply denotes the time needed to complete a stage for the purpose of getting more points. The mercury can be split into multiple blobs by using sharp objects or obstacles. The mercury color can be changed using a Paintshop or merging with other blobs of different colors. Color mixing is based on the RGB color model. The game is made up of worlds referred to as "Labs" that are split into 16 stages represented by test tubes. Each individual stage has achievements for completing with 100% remaining mercury, beating the top score, and collecting all bonus stars. An additional achievement is granted for obtaining all three of these in a single stage and can each be obtained individually in any number of attempts. Labs are unlocked by accumulating mercury from stage completion. If the player does exceptionally well in a particular laboratory, a secret 17th stage is unlocked for that lab.

Mercury Meltdown introduces the Playground, a circular arena, with most of the items found in the stages to play and test with. Another new mechanic is the ability to change the mercury into three new states: Hot, Cold, and Solid. The Hot state turns the mercury into a near-liquid blob that travels more quickly, but is very easy to split. The Cold state turns the mercury into a semi-solid blob that is harder to split, but moves slowly. The Solid state turns the mercury into a solid ball that can never be split, allowing it to traverse over rails, but not through spikes. Multiplayer is accessible via Ad-Hoc wireless mode or online network infrastructure mode. In multiplayer mode, two players can participate in battle mode in which players race each other on any of the unlocked single-player levels. Bonus stars are replaced with battle pick-ups that can assist the player or hinder the opponent.

Mercury Meltdown also includes five unlockable party games: Rodeo, Race, Metrix, Shove, and Paint. In Rodeo, players tilt the stage to prevent the mercury from falling off. In Race, players take control of the mercury as it speeds around a track. Metrix is a match-three puzzle mini game requiring players to make a group of three or more colored blobs that fit inside a predefined grid. Shove is a mini game similar to curling where players aim the mercury for the center spot of a target, avoiding hazards. In Paint, players move the mercury to paint the tray in their respective colors before the opponent does. All of these games are unlocked by accumulating bonus stars from stage completion in the main game and can be played in single-player and multiplayer.

== Development and release ==
Mercury Meltdown was developed by Ignition Banbury (formerly Awesome Studios). Early in the production stages, Archer Maclean, who originally coined the concept of the first game, had resigned from Ignition Banbury. His resignation was early enough in development to not have hindered the game's production. The first game, Archer Maclean's Mercury, was released in a tight production schedule to match the launch of the PlayStation Portable, resulting in a lack of refinements. Mercury Meltdown was closer to what the team originally wanted in the first game due to them becoming more experienced with PSP development. Ignition Banbury chose to use a cel-shaded style to differentiate it from its predecessor and to appeal to a wider audience. One of the criticisms of the original game that the developers made note of was the difficulty. Ignition Banbury focused on making it easier and less linear. It was intended to be released in Europe by September 2006 with plans of having downloadable content (DLC), but the game was delayed and no DLC was released. Mercury Meltdown was released in North America on 3 October 2006, and in Europe on 6 October 2006. A limited edition bundle was released with its predecessor on 19 October 2010. An iOS version was announced in E3 2011, but no new information has since been released.

A month before the release of the PSP version, Ignition Banbury announced a revised version for the PlayStation 2 titled Mercury Meltdown Remix. This version uses the DualShock controller's second analog stick and rumble feature as opposed to the PSP's singular analog. It added new levels, making the total over 200 levels. Mercury Meltdown Remix was released in Europe on 24 November 2006, and in North America on 4 December 2006. The PS2 version was revised once more and ported onto the Wii under the title, Mercury Meltdown Revolution. Ignition Banbury began development when Nintendo announced the Wii under the code name: Revolution and was inspired by the Wii's motion controls. Ignition Banbury then pitched the concept to Nintendo for release on the console in E3 2006, which resulted in approval. Ignition Banbury produced the game using an unfinished GameCube engine and the tilt sensor mechanics that were intended to be used for the original Mercury game. Ignition Banbury further improved the graphics from Mercury Meltdown Remix, added in new levels, and refined the difficulty curve. In addition to utilizing the Wii Remote's tilt controls, Ignition Banbury also implemented the option to play Revolution with a Classic Controller and attempted to add GameCube controller support, but this feature did not make the final release. Mercury Meltdown Revolution was released in Europe on 8 June 2007, and in North America on 17 October 2007.

== Reception ==
Reception

Aggregate score
Aggregator	Score		
Aggregator	PS2	PSP	Wii
Metacritic	73/100 (22 reviews)	78/100 (36 reviews)	77/100 (41 reviews)

Review scores
Publication	Score		
Publication	PS2	PSP	Wii
Edge	N/A	7/10	8/10
Eurogamer	N/A	9/10	9/10
GameSpot	7.2/10	8.2/10	8.5/10
GameZone	7.7/10	N/A	N/A
IGN	6.8/10	8.5/10	7.5/10 (UK)
PALGN	7/10	7/10	8/10
Play	N/A	N/A	3/10
Pocket Gamer	N/A	4/5	N/A

All versions of Mercury Meltdown have been well received by critics. The PSP, PS2, and Wii versions hold a score of 78, 73, and 77 out of 100 respectively. The PSP and Wii versions were featured in 1001 Video Games You Must Play Before You Die. In regards to the original PSP version, critics praised the improvements it made from the difficult and new visual style. Eurogamer praised the difficulty curves for being more consistent and the variety of the level designs. IGN commended the new cel-shaded design and bright colors as opposed to the cold-steel design of its predecessor, stating that it brightens the game and makes it more fun. IGN further elaborated that the new cel-shaded design of the mercury blob makes it easier to define the shape of the blob and when it dissipates. GameSpot also praised the stages for being more pleasing to the eye due to the bright and colorful appearance. PALGN said that the environments did not feel as epic, but did feel more lively. Pocket Gamer stated that it was an improvement from its predecessor in nearly every way.

Mercury Meltdown Remix received mixed reviews from critics. Both GameZone and PALGN complimented the camera controls for improving the game. GameSpot criticized the new controls for the camera, stating the sensitivity was too high and allowing more mistakes to be made. Another criticism was the lack of a multiplayer option, causing the Party games to become dull without it. IGN was also critical of it, feeling that the PlayStation 2 controller did not feel right.

Mercury Meltdown Revolution received a more positive reception, in particular for the motion controls. PALGN complimented how well the motion controls work. Eurogamer felt that the controls were more well-realized than other Wii games at the time and were accessible to all players. IGN UK gave it an editor's choice award, although they said the sound could be better and the lack of multiplayer is disappointing, especially on the Wii. GamePro said the motion controls were fresh and a lot of fun, but they also criticized the lack of multiplayer. Play was very critical of the Wii version due to similar titles in the Wii's library and the art style not being as appealing as other titles such as Kororinpa.
