= George of the Jungle and the Search for the Secret =

2008 video game

- Developers: Papaya Studio; 7 Studios (DS)
- Publishers: NA: Crave Entertainment; EU: Ignition Entertainment
- Composers: Stephen Card; Paul Millunzi
- Platforms: PlayStation 2, Wii, Nintendo DS
- Release: PlayStation 2 & Wii: NA: March 18, 2008; AU: March 20, 2008; EU: April 4, 2008; Nintendo DS: NA: April 1, 2008; PAL: April 4, 2008
- Genre: Platform
- Mode: Single-player

George of the Jungle and the Search for the Secret (George of the Jungle in PAL regions) is a platform video game based on the animated television program George of the Jungle.

== Gameplay ==
The game is 2.5D. There are a total of 6 levels; 2 with a jungle theme, 2 with a swamp theme, and 2 with temple theme. All 6 levels are made to look like the 2007 remake cartoon series. The secret alluded to in the game's title is never explained.

== Reception ==
Reception

Aggregate score
Aggregator	Score		
Aggregator	DS	PS2	Wii
Metacritic	44/100	30/100	35/100

Review scores
Publication	Score		
Publication	DS	PS2	Wii
Eurogamer	N/A	N/A	1/10
GamesMaster	39%	N/A	N/A
IGN	5.4/10	3.1/10	2.9/10
NGamer	N/A	N/A	55%
PlayStation Official Magazine – UK	N/A	3/10	N/A
PSM3	N/A	41%	N/A

The game received "generally unfavorable reviews" on all platforms according to the review aggregation website Metacritic. IGN criticized the Wii and Nintendo DS versions for its poor collision detection and how it mocks the player with doors that lead into the background where the player can't do anything.
