= Archer Maclean =

British video game programmer (1962–2022)

Archer Donald Maclean (28 January 1962 – 17 December 2022) was a British video game programmer. He was the author of Dropzone which he developed for the Atari 8-bit computers and was ported to other systems. Maclean also developed the Commodore 64 version of International Karate and the sequel, IK+ which was developed for the Commodore 64 and ported to other systems. He was also known for his series of snooker and pool games, which commenced with Jimmy White's Whirlwind Snooker in 1991 (originally called 147).

Maclean left Awesome Studios—the studio he helped found and establish—in July 2005 and ran Awesome Play.

Maclean died on 17 December 2022, at the age of 60.

== Early life ==
Maclean showed interest in electronics from an early age, being self taught by way of dismantling electronic devices. In 1972, he dismantled a television. In 1975, he commenced working part time in a television repair shop in Brentwood, Essex.

After a chance meeting with its owner in 1976, Maclean started part-time work at electronics company Ambit International. This work allowed Maclean to start spending "unfeasibly large amounts of money on computer hardware, as a school kid".

== Works ==
Maclean's first game, Dropzone, was heavily influenced by Stargate and Defender.

Maclean's final title for Awesome Studios was Archer Maclean's Mercury completed in 2005. The follow-up versions were Mercury Meltdown for the PlayStation Portable, Mercury Meltdown Remix for the PlayStation 2, and Mercury Meltdown Revolution for the Wii. Maclean then developed a futuristic racing game, WheelSpin, for the Wii.

Maclean also wrote a monthly column for Retro Gamer magazine.

Notable works
Release	Title	Role(s)
1984	Dropzone	Writing
1986	International Karate	Design, graphics
1987	International Karate +	Design, writing, graphics, sound FX
1991	Jimmy White's 'Whirlwind' Snooker	Game design, programming, graphics, sound FX
1992	Archer Maclean's Pool	Original design, programming, sound FX
1998	Jimmy White's 2: Cueball	Direction, design, original code, music, sound FX
2001	Jimmy White's Cueball World	Design
2004	Archer Maclean Presents Pool Paradise	Creative director
2005	Archer Maclean's Mercury	Original concept
2009	Wheelspin	Direction, production, design
