= Teenage Zombies: Invasion of the Alien Brain Thingys! =

2008 video game

- Developer: InLight Entertainment
- Publisher: Ignition Entertainment
- Designer: Mike Lowry
- Composer: Linc Page
- Platform: Nintendo DS
- Release: EU: 28 March 2008; NA: 15 April 2008
- Genre: Platformer
- Mode: Single Player

Teenage Zombies: Invasion of the Alien Brain Thingys! is a video game for the Nintendo DS developed by Canadian studio InLight Entertainment.

== Gameplay ==
Teenage Zombies is a platforming game, that also includes several minigames. In the platforming sections, players need to swap between the three characters, each with their abilities, in order to progress through the levels.

Minigames are opened up through the adventure, and use all the Nintendo DS's unique features, such as the microphone and the touchscreen.

== Reception ==
Reception

Aggregate score
Aggregator	Score
Metacritic	67/100

Review scores
Publication	Score
Destructoid	7/10
Eurogamer	4/10
Game Informer	6.75/10
GameRevolution	C−
GameSpot	6.5/10
GameZone	6.9/10
IGN	6.8/10
Nintendo Power	7/10
Pocket Gamer	3.5/5
VideoGamer.com	7/10
The New York Times	(favorable)

The game received "average" reviews according to the review aggregation website Metacritic.
