= Pool Paradise =

2004 video game

- Developer: Awesome Studios
- Publisher: Ignition Entertainment
- Director: Archer Maclean
- Programmers: Ed Bradley; Fred O'Rourke
- Artist: Drew Northcott
- Composer: Tom Davies
- Platforms: Windows, PlayStation 2, GameCube
- Release: Windows, PlayStation 2: EU: 2 April 2004; NA: April 2004 (PC); NA: 15 June 2004 (PS2); AU: 2004 (PS2); GameCube: EU: 7 May 2004; NA: 28 June 2004
- Genre: Sports
- Modes: Single-player, multiplayer

Pool Paradise is a 2004 pocket billiards video game, developed by Awesome Studios, and published by Ignition Entertainment, released for Microsoft Windows, PlayStation 2, and GameCube. The game is the fourth game to be endorsed by professional snooker and pool player Jimmy White.

== Gameplay ==
Players control a virtual pool player at a beach resort, with pool tables inside different huts. Players have to work their way up the tournament ladder in order to unlock features and complete the game.

The game's features, according to Booners Interactive, include 30 unique computer characters, with highly detailed hands, on an animated island with day and night cycles, and 8 virtual camera modes; 11 different game types and 5 modes of play, with 10 different tournament ladders, and 10 table sizes and shapes; and analog cueing, using a gamepad or a mouse. "Hidden features" throughout the game were also alluded to. As well as various pool and snooker games, beach darts, a coconut shy, skee-ball ramp, and the original Dropzone arcade game are all unlockable. Unlike previous games endorsed by Jimmy White, in Pool Paradise, White is a playable character, and is the best player in game.

== International edition ==
The game was re-released in 2006 under the new title Pool Paradise: International Edition, only in Europe for the PlayStation 2.

== Reception ==
Reception

Aggregate score
Aggregator	Score		
Aggregator	GameCube	PC	PS2
Metacritic	76/100	76/100	77/100

Review scores
Publication	Score		
Publication	GameCube	PC	PS2
Edge	N/A	N/A	8/10
Eurogamer	N/A	N/A	8/10
Game Informer	6/10	N/A	N/A
GameSpot	7.9/10	N/A	7.9/10
GameSpy	3/5	N/A	N/A
GameZone	N/A	N/A	7.9/10
IGN	7.6/10	N/A	7.6/10
Nintendo Power	2.5/5	N/A	N/A
Official U.S. PlayStation Magazine	N/A	N/A	3/5
PC Gamer (UK)	N/A	78%	N/A
BBC Sport	80%	80%	80%
The Sydney Morning Herald	N/A	N/A	4/5

The game received "generally favourable reviews" on all platforms according to the review aggregation website Metacritic. Alex Trickett of BBC Sport called the game "crisp, clean fun at a budget price"; however, he did call the game's soundtrack "uninspired". Alex Navarro of GameSpot enjoyed the European GameCube version months before it was released, stating in an early review, "Pool Paradise features a great gameplay design, as well as a ton of available pool games and side ventures." He also suggested the game was very strong on its own merits commenting "even if Pool Paradise weren't the only available pool game for the GameCube, it would still be a strong choice for any billiards fan." GameSpot later named it the best GameCube game of April 2004, and nominated it for the year-end "Best Alternative Sports Game" award. GameSpy and Game Informer gave the same European GameCube version a mixed review, two months before it was released in Europe, and nearly three months before it was released Stateside.
