= Epics (company) =

Japanese video game developer

epics Inc
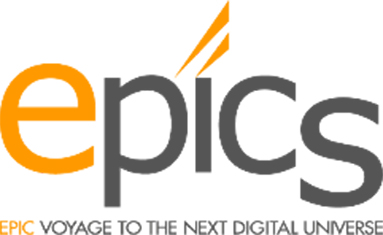
- Native name: 株式会社epics
- Romanized name: Kabushiki gaisha epics
- Type: Private
- Industry: Video games
- Founded: February 1987
- Headquarters: Tokyo, Japan
- Key people: Tetsuji Yamamoto (president, CEO)
- Products: PopoloCrois series
- Revenue: ¥ 100 million yen (2006)
- Parent: WiZ Co., LTD.
- Website: www.epics-gogo.com

epics Inc. (株式会社epics, Kabushiki gaisha epics) is a Japanese video game software developer located in Tokyo, Japan. Originally established as Gen Creative House Co., Ltd. in February 1987, changed company name to G-Artists Inc. in March 1991, then to epics Inc. in June 2006.

== Release history ==
| Release date | Title | Platform | Publisher |
|---|---|---|---|
| JP: 1995; US: 1996 | Philosoma | PlayStation | Sony Computer Entertainment |
| JP: July 12, 1996 | PopoloCrois Monogatari | PlayStation | Sony Computer Entertainment |
| JP: January 31, 1997; US: September 30, 1997 | I.Q.: Intelligent Qube | PlayStation | Sony Computer Entertainment |
| JP: November 26, 1998 | PopoRogue | PlayStation | Sony Computer Entertainment |
| JP: December 23, 1998; EU: August 1999 | I.Q Final | PlayStation | Sony Computer Entertainment |
| JP: January 27, 2000 | PopoloCrois Monogatari II | PlayStation | Sony Computer Entertainment |
| JP: June 20, 2002 | PopoloCrois: Adventure of Beginnings | PlayStation 2 | Sony Computer Entertainment |
| JP: March 18, 2004 | PopoloCrois: Adventure of the Law of the Moon | PlayStation 2 | Sony Computer Entertainment |
| JP: September 15, 2005; US: October 26, 2005; EU: October 21, 2005 | Ghost in the Shell: Stand Alone Complex | PlayStation Portable | JP: Sony Computer Entertainment; NA/EU: Bandai |
| JP: February 10, 2005; US: December 6, 2005; EU: June 16, 2006; AU: June 30, 2006 | PopoloCrois | PlayStation Portable | JP: Sony Computer Entertainment; US: Agetec; EU: Ignition Entertainment |
| JP: 7 December 2006; US: 17 July 2007 | PaRappa the Rapper | PlayStation Portable | Sony Computer Entertainment |
| JP: December 7, 2006 | Ape Escape Racing | PlayStation Portable | Sony Computer Entertainment |
| JP: July 3, 2008 | Nanashi no Game | Nintendo DS | Square Enix |
| JP: February 14, 2008; US: August 26, 2008 | Digimon World Championship | Nintendo DS | JP: Bandai Namco Games, epics; US: Bandai Namco Games |
| JP: November 27, 2008 | Shiseido Beauty Solution Kaihatsu Center Kanshuu: Project Beauty | Nintendo DS | JP: Sega, epics |
| JP: March 26, 2009 | Keitai Sousakan 7 DS: Buddy Sequence | Nintendo DS | JP: epics, 5pb |
| JP: August 27, 2009 | Nanashi no Game: Me | Nintendo DS | Square Enix |
| JP: October 15, 2009 | PoPoLoCrois Monogatari: Story Card Quest | Smartphone | JP: Sony Computer Entertainment, EZWeb |
| JP: February 28, 2011 | PoPoLoCrois Monogatari: The Adventure of Dreams and Bonds | Smartphone | JP: Sony Computer Entertainment, epics |
| JP: June 18, 2015; US: March 1, 2016 | Return to PopoloCrois | Nintendo 3DS | JP: Marvelous, epics; US: Marvelous USA |
| JP/SEA: May 8, 2018 | PoPoLoCrois Monogatari: Narcia's Tears And The Fairy's Flute | Smartphone | JP: Sega, epics; SEA: goGame |

=== Nanashi no Game ===
Nanashi no Game
- Developer: Epics
- Publisher: Square Enix
- Director: Nobuhiko Tenkawa
- Producers: Seiichiro Tsuno; Yosuke Tomita
- Artist: Arata Sakai
- Composer: Masayoshi Soken
- Platform: Nintendo DS
- Release: JP: July 3, 2008
- Genre: Survival horror
- Mode: Single-player

Nanashi no Game (ナナシ ノ ゲエム, Nanashi no Geemu; lit. "Nameless Game" or "The Game with No Name") is a first-person survival horror video game developed by Epics and published by Square Enix for the Nintendo DS. The game follows a university student who becomes cursed by the titular role-playing game, which causes people to die in seven days upon starting. It was released on July 3, 2008, in Japan. A sequel, titled Nanashi no Game: Me, was later released on August 27, 2009 in Japan.

Most of the game takes place in the real world, where the player navigates real-time 3D environments using the DS's D-Pad and Touch Screen. While exploring, the player must solve puzzles and reach locations. The player can switch to the TS Menu at any time, where they can play the cursed game, read e-mail messages, and load a previous save file. In many cases, an e-mail message or update to the cursed game will interrupt the player's exploration. In the cursed game, which only uses the top DS screen, the player controls a 2D 8-bit RPG that provides clues to the current situations and can, in some cases, advance the story. The player encounters Regrets (ルグレ, Rugure), zombie-like spirits that roam the area in exploration mode and end the game upon touching the player.

As of September 30, 2008, Nanashi no Game has sold 60,000 copies in Japan. Famitsu rated the game 30/40.

Nanash no Game: Me
- Developer: Epics
- Publisher: Square Enix
- Series: Nanashi no Game
- Platform: Nintendo DS
- Release: JP: August 27, 2009
- Genre: Survival horror
- Mode: Single-player

Epics developed a sequel, Nanashi no Game: Me (ナナシ ノ ゲエム 目, Nanashi no Geemu Me; lit. "Nameless Game: Eye"), a survival horror video game for the Nintendo DS. It was published by Square Enix, and released on August 27, 2009 in Japan. The story follows an anthropology student from Nanto University, as he discovers two cursed games, an RPG and a platformer. The game's title refers to the protagonist's left eye, represented by the left screen of the DS when held sideways, which allows the player to see things left (and hidden) by the curse. It sold 15,000 copies on the week of its release.

Much like in the original, Nanashi no Game: Me involves two separate modes of play. Most of the game takes place in the real world, where the player navigates real-time 3D environments using the DS's D-Pad and Touch Screen. While exploring, the player must solve puzzles and reach locations. The player can switch to the TS Menu at any time, where they can play the cursed game, read e-mail messages, and load a previous save file. In many cases, an e-mail message or update to the cursed game will interrupt the player's exploration. In the cursed game, which only uses the top DS screen, the player controls a 2D 8-bit RPG that provides clues to the current situations and can, in some cases, advance the story. In Nanashi no Game: Me, the player can now choose the locations they want to explore out of the two available for each day (for three days only). Each destination provides different experiences, including the Regrets the player will encounter.

Two spin-off DSiWare titles, named Noroi no Game: Chi (ノロイ ノ ゲエム 血, Noroi no Gēmu Chi; lit. "Cursed Game: Blood") and Noroi no Game: Oku (ノロイ ノ ゲエム 獄, Noroi no Gēmu Oku; lit. "Cursed Game: Prison") respectively, have also been released on 9 September 2009. Another sequel, Nanashi no Appli (ナナシ ノ 或プリ, Nanashi no Apuri; lit. "Nameless App"), was released on 26 January 2012 for iOS, and in February 2012 for Android.
