= Dropzone =

1984 video game

- Developer: Arena Graphics
- Publishers: U.S. Gold; Mindscape; Acclaim Entertainment (GBC)
- Designer: Archer Maclean
- Platforms: Atari 8-bit, Commodore 64, Game Boy, Game Boy Color, Game Gear, NES
- Release: 1984
- Genre: Scrolling shooter
- Mode: Single-player

Dropzone is a horizontally scrolling shooter developed by Archer Maclean (under the name Arena Graphics) for Atari 8-bit computers and published in 1984 by U.S. Gold. It was ported to the Commodore 64, and later released for the Nintendo Entertainment System, Game Boy, Game Gear, and Game Boy Color. Ports for Master System and Sega Genesis were also announced, but never released.

Maclean's first commercial game, Dropzone is similar in gameplay and style to the arcade game Defender and borrows many elements, including the same style of font, aliens, and title screen.

== Plot ==
On the surface of Jupiter's moon, Io, a human scientific research base is under attack by aliens. The player dons a jetpack armed with a laser, a cloaking device and three smart bombs, to rescue the scientists and return them to the base.

== Gameplay ==
Gameplay screenshot (Atari 8-bit)

The gameplay is in the style of Williams Electronics' Defender, with some influences from Scramble and Robotron: 2084. Players control the hero trying to rescue the scientists on a horizontally-scrolling game field. Players must elude or engage various aliens—some slow, others faster—and return the scientists to the base's eponymous dropzone. The aliens capture scientists walking along the ground. The player must shoot the enemy aliens and catch the falling scientists. Sometimes the aliens will carry lethal androids instead, which must be avoided.

There are 99 levels of gameplay, each increasingly difficult. After level 99, the levels repeat starting with level 95.

== Development ==
Maclean purchased an Atari 800 as soon as they were officially launched in the UK in 1981 and started writing what would eventually evolve into Dropzone. Maclean converted the game to the Commodore 64 himself:

The [Commodore] 64 Dropzone is about 46k [kilobytes] long and consists of 15,000 lines of sparsely commented code with around 350 subroutines and around 3000 labels. Those who can reach Megastar status on the 64 should have had enough practice to attempt an Atari supervised Dropzone mission. The Atari, being the Porsche of home computers, is capable of running Dropzone 2.5 times faster than the 64 and can handle any amount of blobs on screen, even when you release a Strata Bomb. It is visually, sonically etc., identical and about 12K shorter. However, the 64 is still a respectable BMW 316.

The name Dropzone was not settled on until shortly before the game went gold.

Maclean entered into a publishing deal with U.S. Gold for the European distribution of the game. After 18 months, however, they stopped paying him royalties claiming that the game was no longer selling. In addition, Maclean saw it for sale in areas outside of Europe and even in the United States. Four years of legal wrangling with the publisher followed, until they finally settled out of court for copyright infringement. With the proceeds from the settlement, Maclean bought his first Ferrari.

== Reception ==
The Atari 8-bit version received overwhelmingly good reviews. A reviewer for Computer and Video Games in a May 1985 review said that Dropzone was one of the best Atari games and Atari owners could not afford to miss this game. Personal Computer World reviewer agreed with this notion, who also praised the game's graphics and sound.

The Commodore 64 version of the game was awarded a gold medal in issue 3 of Zzap!64 magazine, with an overall rating of 95%.

== Legacy ==
The sequel, Super Dropzone, adds new weapon types and end-level bosses. It was released for the Super Nintendo Entertainment System (titled Super Dropzone on all packaging, but only Dropzone on the title screen), Game Boy Advance, and PlayStation. Only the Game Boy Advance version saw a North American release; the others were European exclusives.

A fully playable port of the C64 version can be found in Windows, PlayStation, and Dreamcast versions of Jimmy White's 2: Cueball, also by Archer Maclean.
