= SpeedZone (video game) =

2009 video game

Wheelspin / SpeedZone
- European cover art
- Developer: Awesome Play
- Publishers: NA: Detn8 Games; EU: Bethesda Softworks
- Platform: Wii
- Release: NA: August 18, 2009; EU: November 27, 2009
- Genre: Racing
- Modes: Single-player, multiplayer

Wheelspin, known as SpeedZone in America, is a futuristic racing video game for the Wii, developed by British developer Awesome Play and published by Detn8 Games in North America and Bethesda Softworks in Europe. The races take place on various terrains such as space stations, planets and asteroids.

== Gameplay ==
Boost pads are used to accelerate 'into the zone' where racing lines and phantom cars are used in an attempt to set lap records, levels are unlocked by beating a set Zone-Time. There are shortcuts and secret pickups to be found with bonus rewards being earned by setting new best times. These bonus rewards can then be used to buy aerodynamic aids, various performance upgrades, new cars and skins which all help to give a speed increase when re-attempting levels.

A single pickup is added randomly during each race, this power-up transforms the car driven into a giant enemy robot, which does massive damage to other cars. While in control of the robot speed is greatly increased but maneuverability is drastically brought down and it becomes harder for other cars to overtake you.

In Race mode seven computer-controlled cars are competed against, unlocking levels by finishing in the top three or better. Finally there is Battle Mode which is a futuristic demolition derby; players can use an assortment of weapons such as rockets, mines, lasers, missiles, a lightning gun and a chain gun. There are also assorted defensive pick-ups such as shields, a stealth cloak and shock-jumps.

=== Multiplayer ===
Race and Battle modes allow up to eight simultaneous players (via split screen). Similar to Bust-A-Move Bash, Wheelspin implements 5-8 player games by having four players use Wii Remotes, while other players use external controllers connected to them (Nunchuks or Classic Controllers) or other controllers that directly connect to the Wii console, such as GameCube controllers and Logitech Speed Force Wireless force feedback racing wheels. This is the first Wii game to support four Logitech wheels simultaneously.

== Development ==
The game was developed by Awesome Play Ltd a U.K company founded by programmer Archer Maclean. This would be the final game he was involved in developing.

== Reception ==
Reception

Aggregate score
Aggregator	Score
Metacritic	37/100

Review scores
Publication	Score
Edge	3/10
GamePro	2.5/5
GamesTM	3/10
Jeuxvideo.com	7/20
NGamer	38%
Official Nintendo Magazine	11%
VideoGamer.com	4/10

The game received "unfavorable" reviews according to the review aggregation website Metacritic.
