= PQ2: Practical Intelligence Quotient 2 =

2006 puzzle video game

- Front cover of the North American release of PQ2, representative of the in-game graphics and puzzles
- Developer: Now Production
- Publishers: JP: Now Production; WW: D3 Publisher
- Platform: PlayStation Portable
- Release: JP: December 21, 2006; NA: June 18, 2007; EU: August 3, 2007
- Genre: Puzzle game
- Mode: Single-player

PQ2: Practical Intelligence Quotient 2 (also known as PQ2; Intelligent License 2 (インテリジェント・ライセンス2, Interijento Raisensu 2) in Japan; Practical IQ in Europe) is a puzzle game for the PlayStation Portable, and a sequel to PQ: Practical Intelligence Quotient. The game is based on testing the model of human intelligence developed by Dr. Masuo Koyasu at Kyoto University.

== Gameplay ==
PQ2 shares many features with the first PQ game and similar platform-like puzzle games. In each stage, the player controls a human avatar in a virtual reality world, climbing and dropping from levels, lifting, dropping, pushing and pulling boxes in order to activate switches and lifts, block laser beams, and to create stairways in order to reach an exit point. The player must also avoid guards that make rounds on the level.

The main game is presented as an intelligence test of 100 stages. The player is given a total cumulative time of 5 hours to complete all 100 puzzles; time is only counted while the player is performing the puzzles, and the player can save and come back at any time without time penalty. The player's score is based on the number of "moves" (excluding walking around) on the stage, the time it took to complete it, and the number of attempts at that stage. A player can skip a stage with a scoring penalty; levels not completed in the 5 hour limit are also penalized against the player. Once completed, the player can upload their score to worldwide scoring tables to compare their results.

Obstacles in levels include:

- Boxes. Small opaque boxes can be picked up and dropped, and their height is the maximum height that the avatar can climb up on, thus these are commonly used to make stairs. Larger boxes can be pushed or pulled.
- Glass boxes. These boxes operate like regular boxes, but will shatter if dropped from any height or hit by something dropped on them. They also are translucent and will allow both laser and regular light through.
- Laser boxes. Like regular boxes but have laser beams that come out of one end. Crossing the beams will prematurely end the level.
- Switch panels and switch boxes. Colored switches, when active, will activate platforms that may move across the field or that increase height, while deactivating a switch will cause these platforms to return to their original position. Floor panels are active by stepping on them or placing a box on them, while switch boxes require a laser beam to hit them.
- Teleporters. These can be moved like boxes and will teleport the avatar between the end points.
- Police officers. These characters roam from one police call box to the next closest one, and shine a line in front of them. Should the avatar be caught in this light, the level must be restarted. The police call boxes can be moved to alter the police officer's behavior.
- Detectives. These characters will follow a specific roaming path until they discover footprints left by the avatar. At this point, they will follow the footprints until either the trail is lost, they find an obstacle they cannot pass through, or until they catch the avatar (which then will restart the level). Footprints will disappear after a number of steps, but can also be manipulated by using boxes and other obstacles.

PQ2 introduces the ability to create one's own levels to share with friends, and a "weekly quiz" that can be downloaded through the Internet.

== Reception ==
Reception

Aggregate score
Aggregator	Score
Metacritic	74/100

Review scores
Publication	Score
Electronic Gaming Monthly	8.67/10
Famitsu	31/40
GamePro	3/5
GameSpot	7.7/10
GameZone	8.5/10
Hardcore Gamer	2.5/5
IGN	8/10
PlayStation Official Magazine – UK	6/10 (OPS2) 4/10
Pocket Gamer	3.5/5
PlayStation: The Official Magazine	7/10
The A.V. Club	A−

The game received "mixed or average reviews" according to the review aggregation website Metacritic. GameSpot said, "PQ2 builds on the good foundation of the original and addresses many of its weaknesses, offering a bigger, better puzzle experience," yet mentioning that the "presentation is still very understated". In Japan, Famitsu gave it a score of one seven, one nine, one seven, and one eight for a total of 31 out of 40.
