= PQ: Practical Intelligence Quotient =

2005 puzzle video game

- Developers: Now Production; O-Two
- Publishers: JP: Now Production; WW: D3 Publisher
- Platform: PlayStation Portable
- Release: JP: May 26, 2005; NA: January 11, 2006; EU: July 14, 2006
- Genre: Puzzle game
- Mode: Single-player

PQ: Practical Intelligence Quotient, also known as simply PQ, is a puzzle game for the PlayStation Portable. The game is known in Japan as Intelligent License (インテリジェント・ライセンス, Interijento Raisensu).

PQ is notable for being the first published game from D3 Publisher in North America.

A sequel, PQ2: Practical Intelligence Quotient 2, was released in 2006–2007.

== Gameplay ==
The game's framework is centered on discovering the player's "practical intelligence quotient," by completing a test consisting of 100 puzzles. The player controls a white, human-like avatar who can interact with the game world. The puzzles are all logic-based, and include a variety of tasks, from rearranging blocks to avoiding security guards to operating machinery. In most of the levels, an exit must be reached to complete that stage.

After clearing all 100 levels, the player's score is determined based on how long each stage took, among other variables. The player's PQ could be taken online and be compared with other players' scores (a high score table was also available online).

== Reception ==
Reception

Aggregate score
Aggregator	Score
Metacritic	69/100

Review scores
Publication	Score
Edge	5/10
Electronic Gaming Monthly	6.5/10
Game Informer	7.75/10
GameSpot	7/10
GameSpy	3.5/5
GameZone	7.9/10
IGN	7.4/10
Official U.S. PlayStation Magazine	4.5/5
Pocket Gamer	3/5
X-Play	3/5
Detroit Free Press	1/4

The game received "average" reviews according to the review aggregation website Metacritic. IGN called PQ a "deep, involving puzzle game". GameSpot noted that while the game has some "deliberate and challenging puzzles", one has to be "willing to look past an interface that is occasionally awkward".
