= OSG =

OSG may refer to:

- Office of the Solicitor General of the Philippines
- Office of the Solicitor General of the United States
- Office of the Surgeon General of the United States
- Oklahoma State Guard, active during World War II
- On-site generation of electrical power
- One Scotland Gazetteer, the definitive national land, property and address dataset for Scotland
- Open Science Grid, a worldwide collection of technological resources
- OpenSceneGraph, a 3D graphics programming interface
- Operational Studies Group, a publisher of wargames related primarily to the Napoleonic Wars
- Overseas Shipholding Group
