= Football pitch =

Area for playing association football

Standard pitch measurements, with permitted ranges for length and width. The preferred size for many professional teams' pitches is 115 by 74 yards (105 by 68 metres).

A football pitch or soccer field is the playing surface for the game of association football. Its dimensions and markings are defined by Law 1 of the Laws of the Game, "The Field of Play". The pitch is typically made of natural turf or artificial turf, although amateur and recreational teams often play on dirt fields. Artificial surfaces are allowed only to be green in colour.

All line markings on the pitch form part of the area which they define. For example, a ball on or above the touchline is still on the field of play, and a foul committed over the line bounding the penalty area results in a penalty. Therefore, a ball has to completely cross the touchline to be out of play, and a ball has to fully cross the goal line (between the goal posts) in order for a goal to be scored; if any part of the ball is still on or above the line, a goal is not scored and the ball is still in play.

The field descriptions that apply to adult matches are described below. Because of the role of the British football associations in the history of the game, the dimensions of the field of play were originally formulated and expressed in imperial units. Since 1999, the Laws of the Game have preferred metric units, with imperial equivalents given only in brackets. Because the actual values have, in general, not changed since the early twentieth century, they tend to be round numbers in imperial units (for example the width of the goal, unchanged since 1863, is 8 yards (7.32 metres)). Use of the imperial values remains very common, especially in Great Britain and the United States.

== Pitch boundary ==
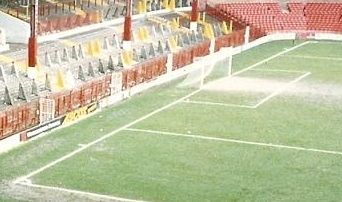
The goal line at the Stretford End of Old Trafford in Manchester (1992)

The difference of pitch sizes among competitions.

The pitch is rectangular in shape. The shorter sides are called goal lines and the longer sides are called the touchlines. The two goal lines are between 50 and 100 yards (46 and 91 metres) wide and must be the same length. The two touchlines are between 100 and 130 yards (91 and 119 metres) long and, likewise, must be the same length. All lines on the ground are equally wide, not to exceed 12 centimetres (4.72 in). The corners of the pitch are marked by corner flags.

For international matches the field dimensions are more tightly constrained; the goal lines are between 70–80 yards (64–73 m) wide and the touchlines are between 110–120 yards (100–110 m) long. FIFA recommends that the field of play measures exactly 105 metres (115 yards) long and 68 metres (74 yards) wide; most – but not all – top-level professional pitches conform to these constraints.

Although the term goal line is often taken to mean only that part of the line between the goalposts, in fact it refers to the complete line at either end of the pitch, from one corner flag to the other. In contrast the term byline (or by-line) is often used to refer to that portion of the goal line outside the goalposts. This term is commonly used in football commentaries and match descriptions.

== Goals ==
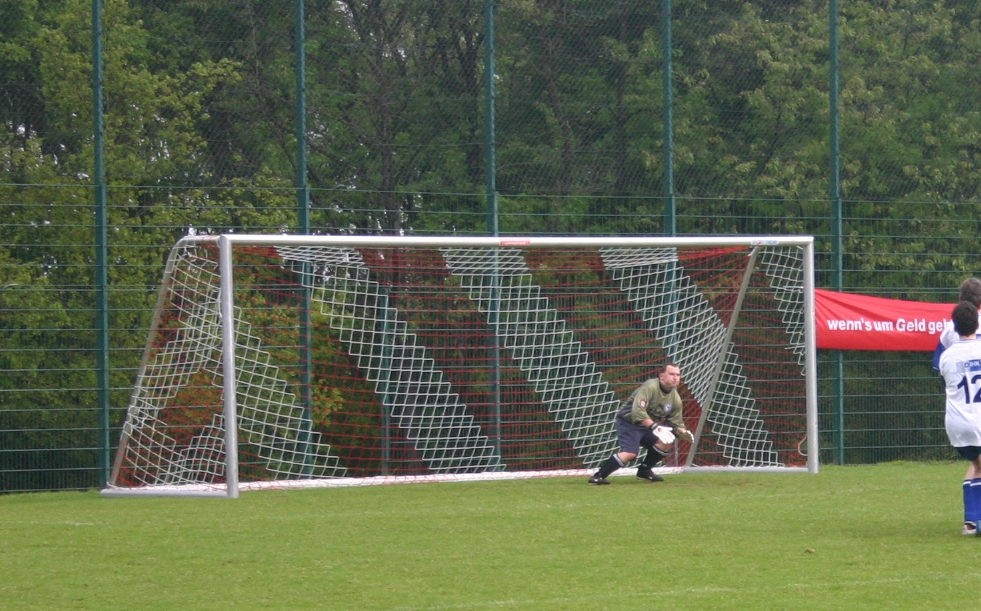
A football goal

Goals are placed at the centre of each goal-line. These consist of two upright posts placed equidistant from the corner flagposts, joined at the top by a horizontal crossbar. The inner edges of the posts are regulated to be 8 yards (7.32 metres) (wide) apart, and the lower edge of the crossbar is elevated to 8 feet (2.44 metres) above the pitch. As a result, the area that players shoot at is 192 square feet (17.84 square metres). Nets are usually placed behind the goal, though are not required by the Laws.

Goalposts and crossbars have to be white and made of wood, metal or other approved material. Rules regarding the shape of goalposts and crossbars are somewhat more lenient, but they have to conform to a shape that does not pose a threat to players. Despite this, injuries due to goalpost collisions are still quite common, and not much research goes into this aspect of player safety.

Recent developments in material science, however, have shown that there are a variety of materials that can be used to coat goalposts to reduce impact on players, hence improving safety. The majority of these materials come from various mixtures of polymers with desirable properties. An example of this would be a mixture made of 63% by weight of methyl methacrylate, 32% by weight of polyethylene glycol, crosslinked with 5% by weight of ethylene glycol dimethacrylate. This has up to a 99% shape recovery rate with very heavy impacts (such as that of a high speed player hitting the post), and deform significantly enough so as to reduce the impact on the player. This significantly improves player safety, while sacrificing very little in terms of function of the goal post.

A goal is scored when the ball fully crosses the goal line between the goal-posts and beneath the crossbar, even if a defending player last touched the ball before it crossed the goal line (see own goal). A goal may, however, be ruled illegal (and void by the referee) if the player who scored or a member of their team commits an offence under any of the laws between the time the ball was previously out of play and the goal being scored. It is also deemed void if a player on the opposing team commits an offence before the ball has passed the line, as in the case of fouls being committed, a penalty awarded but the ball continued on a path that caused it to cross the goal line.

The football goal size for a junior match goal is approximately half the size of an adult sized match goal.

== Penalty and goal areas ==
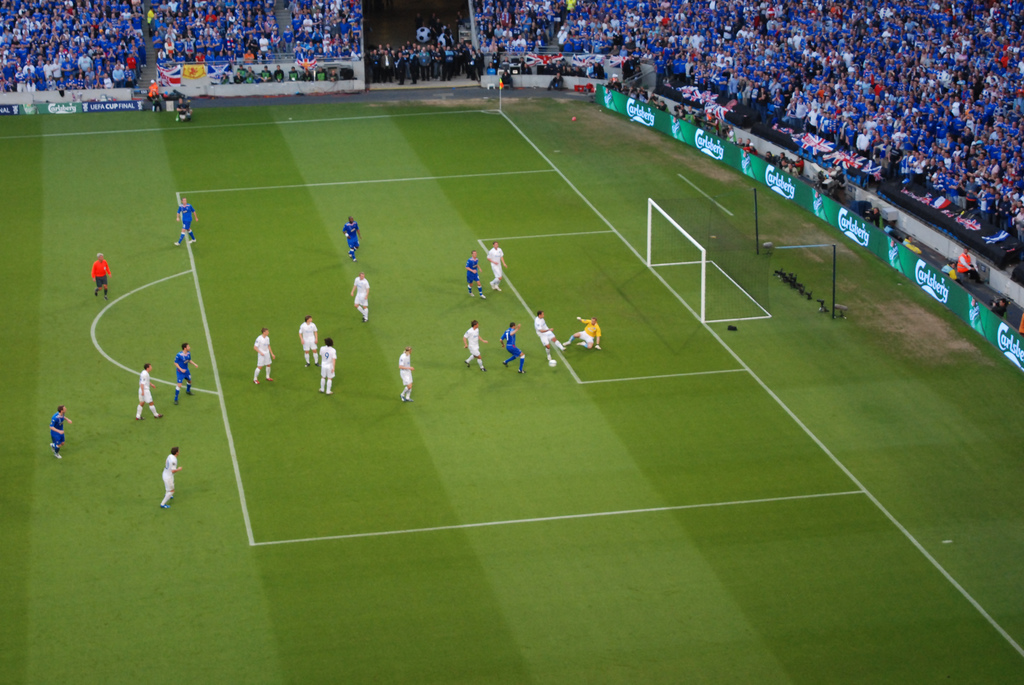
The penalty area is the large marked rectangular area. The smaller rectangle within it is the goal area (here, the yellow-shirted goalkeeper is the only player in the goal area). The penalty arc is the curved line adjoining the "top" of the penalty area (here, the red-shirted referee is standing near the arc).

Two rectangular boxes are marked out on the pitch in front of each goal.

The goal area (colloquially the "six-yard box"), consists of the rectangle formed by the goal-line, two lines starting on the goal-line 6 yards (5.49 metres) from the goalposts and extending 6 yards (5.49 metres) into the pitch from the goal-line, and the line joining these, i.e. they are a rectangle 6 yards (5.49 metres) by 20 yards (18.29 metres). Goal kicks and any free kick by the defending team may be taken from anywhere in this area. FIFA's laws of the game stipulates that: "All free kicks are taken from the place where the offence occurred, except: indirect free kicks to the attacking team for an offence inside the opponents' goal area are taken from the nearest point on the goal area line which runs parallel to the goal line, and free kicks to the defending team in their goal area may be taken from anywhere in that area."

The penalty area (colloquially "the 18-yard box" or just "the box") is similarly formed by the goal-line and lines extending from it, but its lines start 18 yards (16.46 metres) from the goalposts and extend 18 yards (16.46 metres) into the field. i.e. this is a rectangle 44 yards (40.23 metres) by 18 yards (16.46 metres). This area has a number of functions, the most prominent being to denote where the goalkeeper may handle the ball and where a foul by a defender, usually punished by a direct free kick, becomes punishable by a penalty kick. Both the goal and penalty areas were formed as semicircles until 1902.

The penalty mark (colloquially "the penalty spot" or just "the spot") is 12 yards (10.97 metres) in front of the very centre of the goal: this is the point from where penalty kicks are taken.

The penalty arc (colloquially "the D") is marked from the outside edge of the penalty area, 10 yards (9.14 metres) from the penalty mark; this, along with the penalty area, marks an exclusion zone for all players other than the penalty kicker and defending goalkeeper during a penalty kick.

== Other markings ==
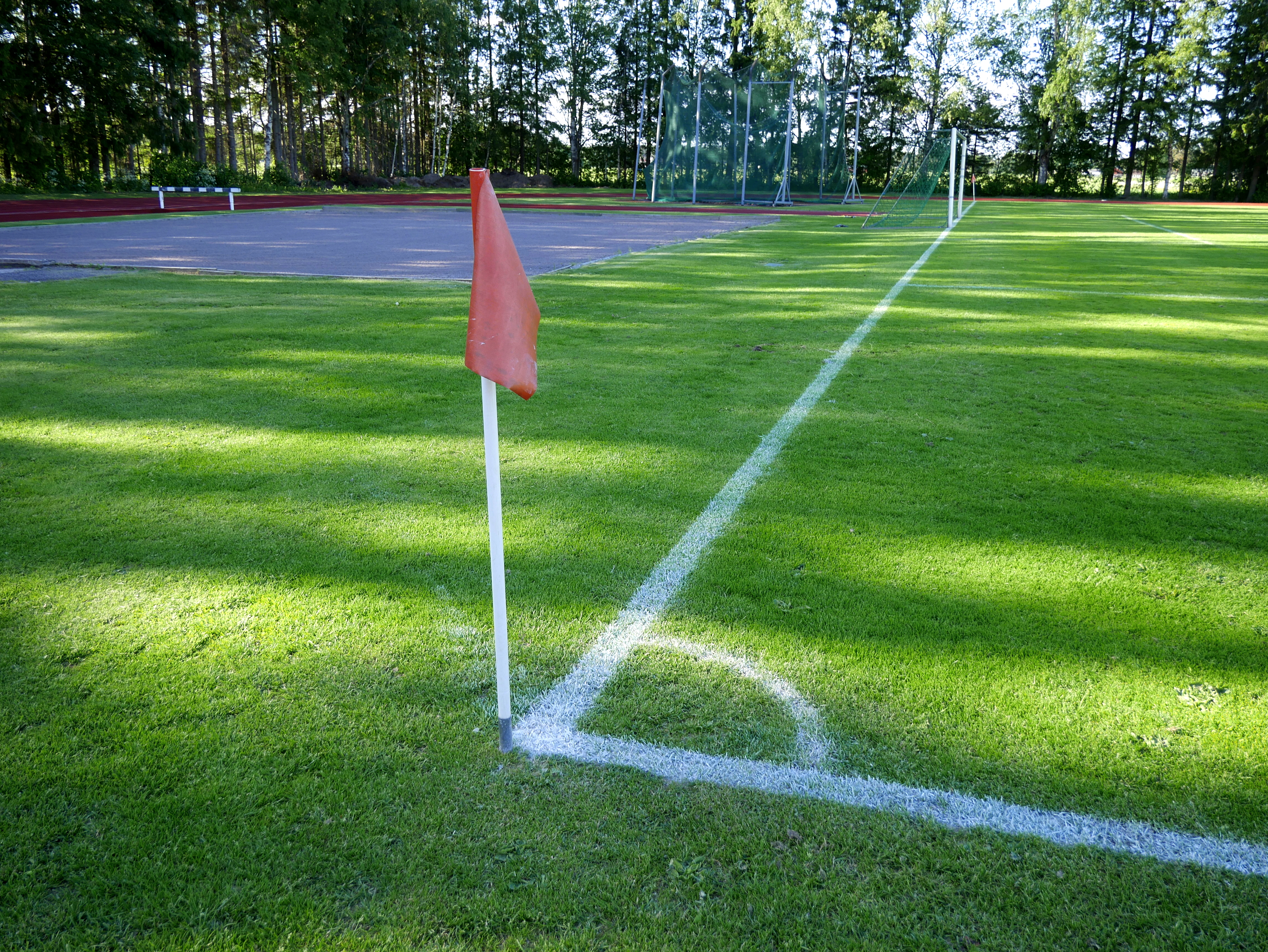
Corner arc and flag

The centre circle is marked at 10 yards (9.14 metres) from the centre mark. Similar to the penalty arc, this indicates the minimum distance that opposing players have to keep at kick-off; the ball itself is placed on the centre mark. During penalty shootouts all players other than the two goalkeepers and the current kicker are required to remain within this circle.

The half-way line divides the pitch in two. The half which a team defends is commonly referred to as being their half. Players have to be located within their own half at a kick-off and may not be penalised as being offside in their own half. The intersections between the half-way line and the touchline can be indicated with flags like those marking the corners – the laws consider this as an optional feature.

The arcs in the corners denote the area (within 1 yard (0.91 metres) of the corner) in which the ball has to be placed for corner kicks; opposition players have to be 10 yards (9.14 metres) away during a corner, and there may be optional lines off-pitch 10 yards (9.14 metres) away from the corner arc on the goal- and touch-lines to help gauge these distances.

== Turf ==
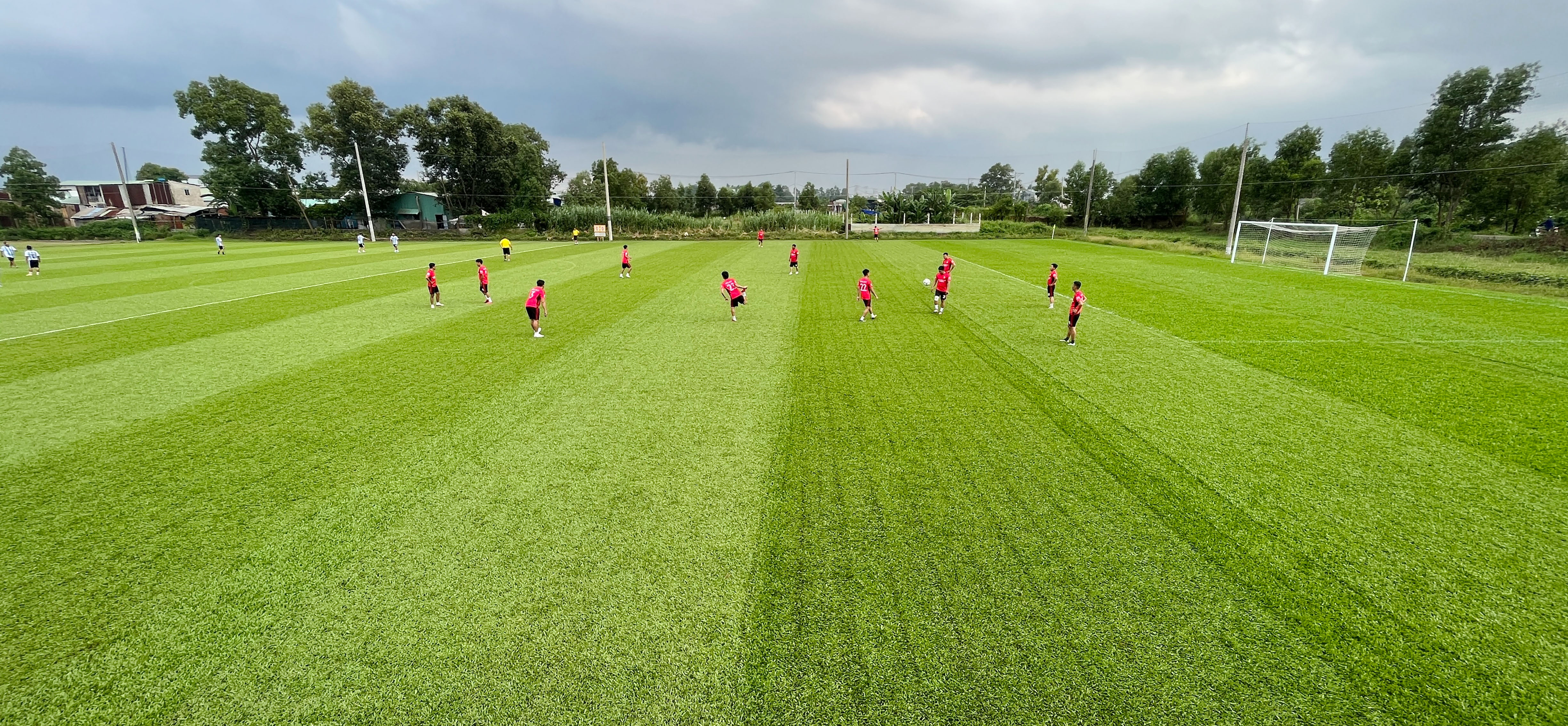
A natural grass football pitch located in Vietnam.

Grass is the normal surface of play, although artificial turf may sometimes be used especially in locations where maintenance of grass may be difficult due to inclement weather. This may include areas where it is very wet, causing the grass to deteriorate rapidly; where it is very dry, causing the grass to die; and where the turf is under heavy use. The latest artificial surfaces use rubber crumbs, as opposed to the previous system of sand infill. Some leagues and football associations have specifically prohibited artificial surfaces due to injury concerns and require teams' home stadia to have grass pitches. All artificial turf has to be green and also meet the requirements specified in the FIFA Quality Concept for Football Turf.

Football can also be played on a dirt or gravel field. In most parts of the world dirt is used only for casual recreational play.

In the winter, the pitch may be used for bandy (similar to ice hockey) games after being filled with water which is allowed to freeze.

== History ==
Before IFAB fixed the dimensions, FA stipulates football pitches were 50–100 yards (46–91 m) wide x 100–200 yards (91–183 m) long.

Football goals were first described in England in the late 16th and early 17th centuries. In 1584 and 1602 respectively, John Norden and Richard Carew referred to "goals" in Cornish hurling. Carew described how goals were made: "they pitch two bushes in the ground, some eight or ten foote asunder; and directly against them, ten or twelue [twelve] score off, other twayne in like distance, which they terme their Goales". The first reference to scoring a goal is in John Day's play The Blind Beggar of Bethnal Green (performed circa 1600; published 1659). Similarly in a poem in 1613, Michael Drayton refers to "when the Ball to throw, And drive it to the Gole, in squadrons forth they goe". Solid crossbars were first introduced by the Sheffield Rules. Football nets were invented by Liverpool engineer John Brodie in 1891, and they were a necessary help for discussions about whether or not a goal had been scored.

Historic Association football pitches

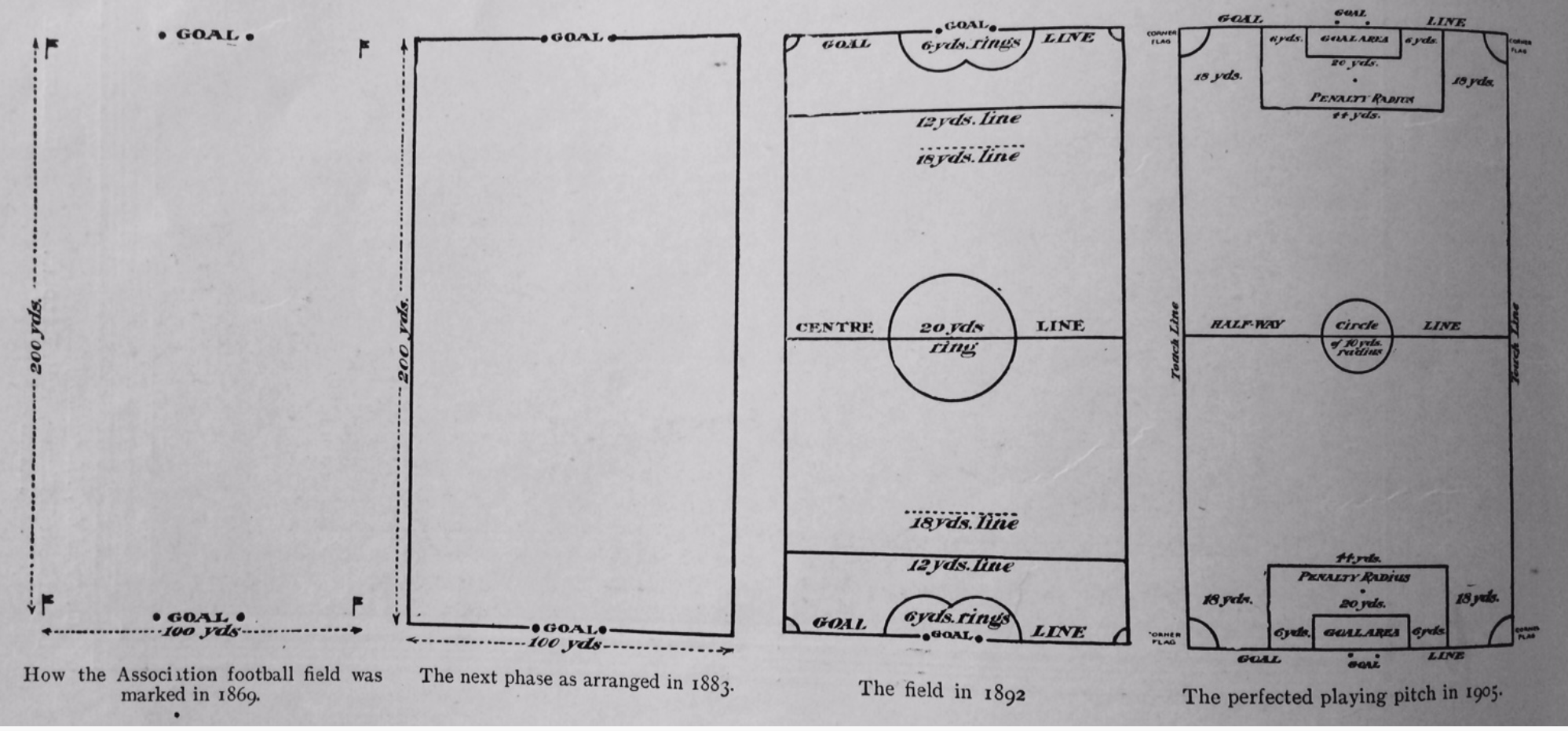
1869-1905

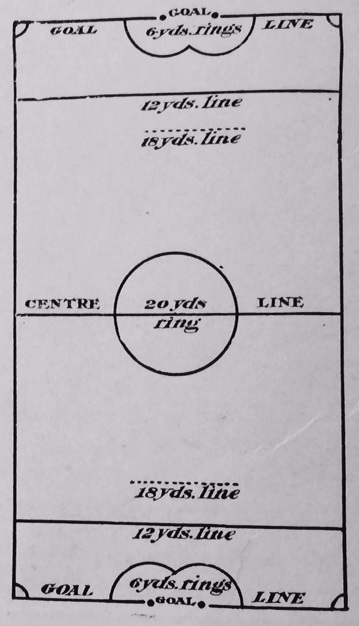
1892

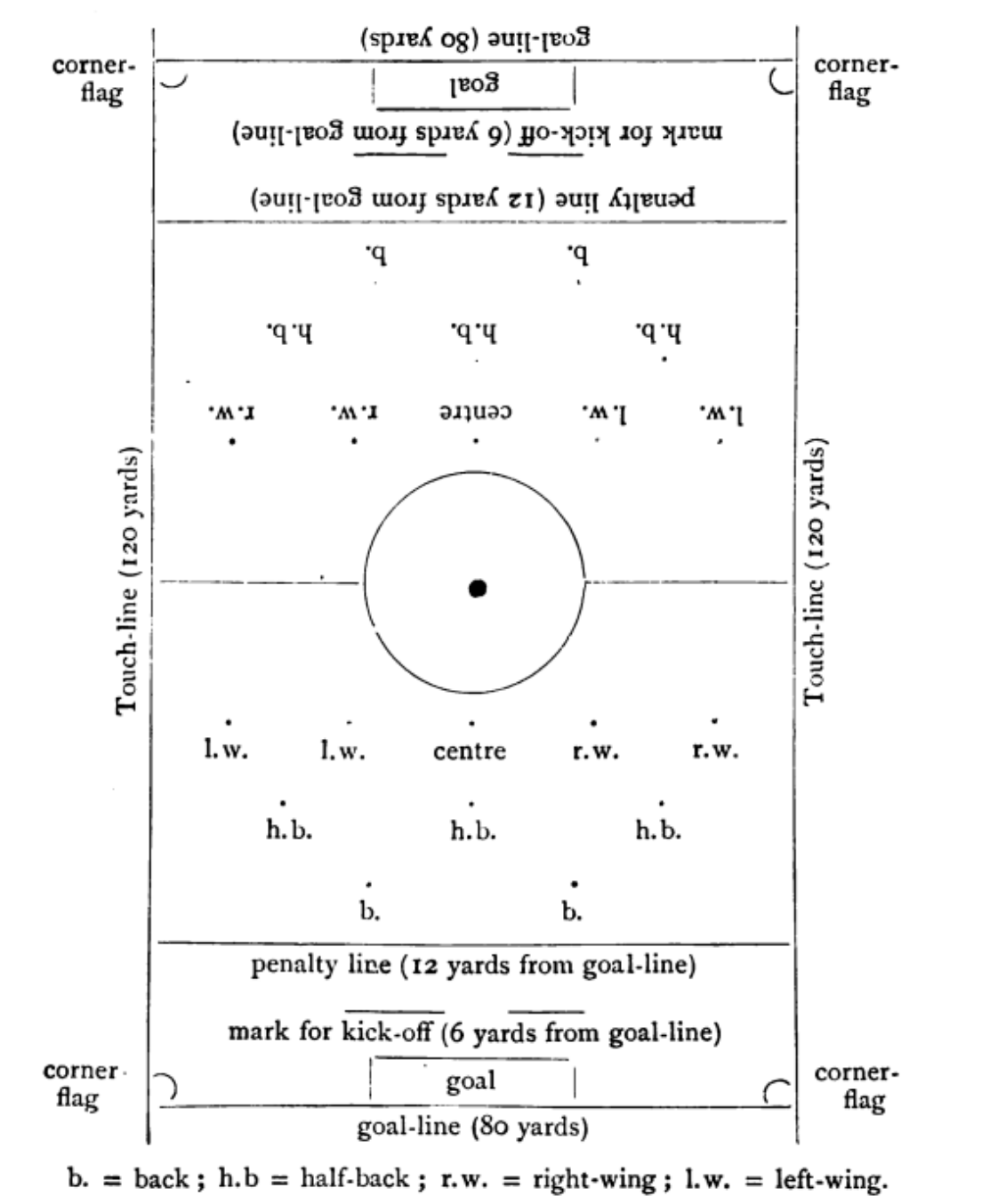
1898

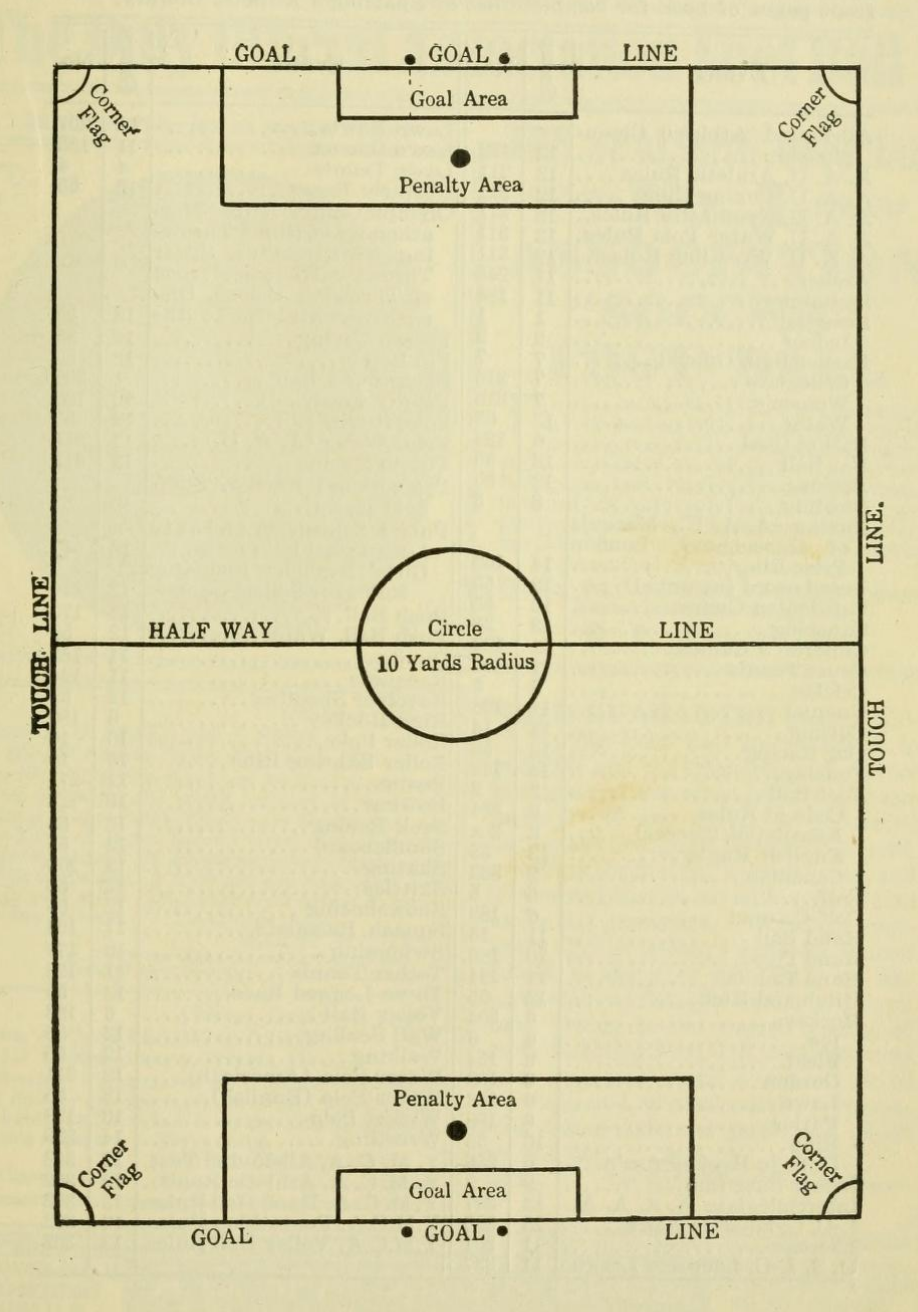
1902

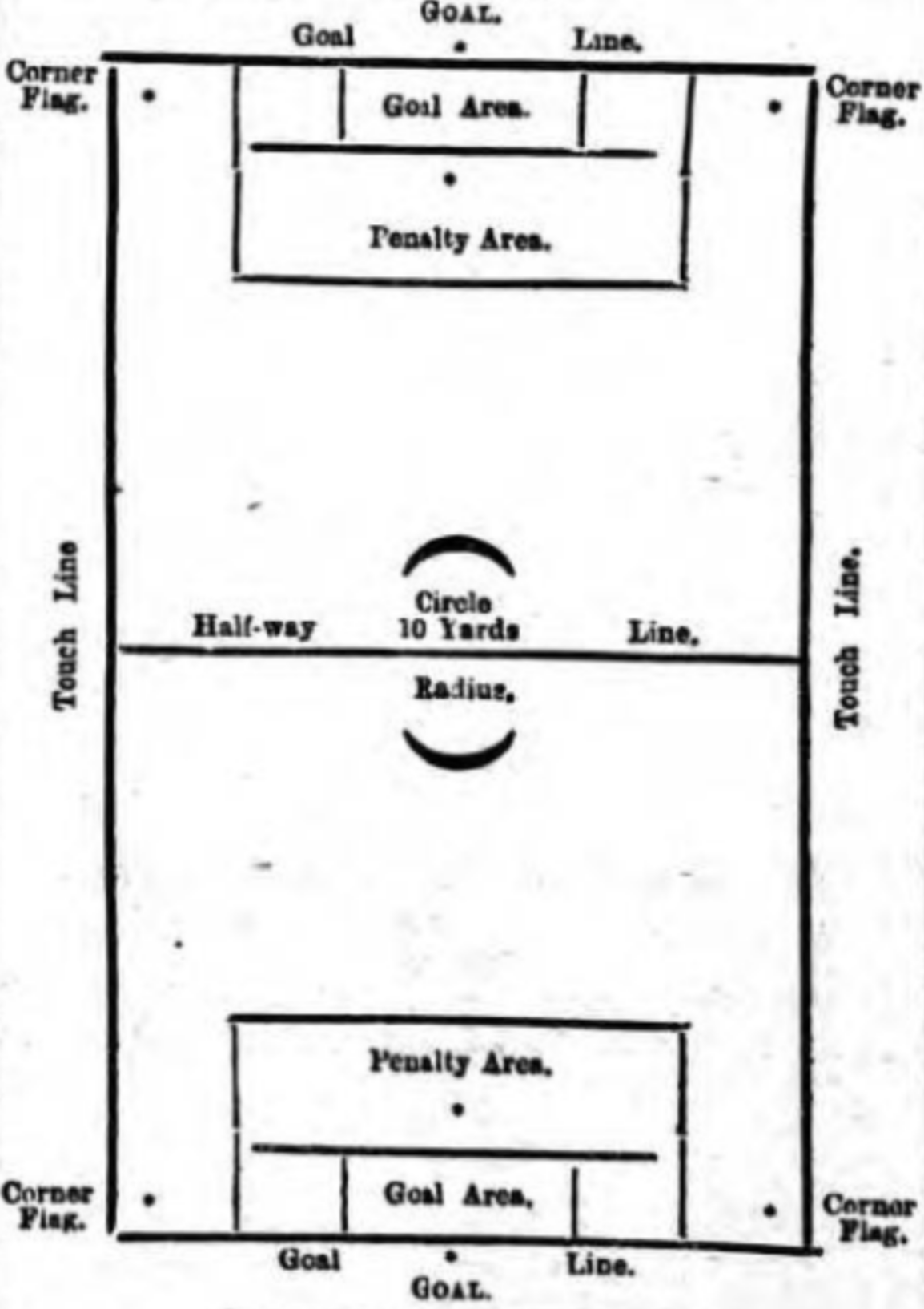
1902

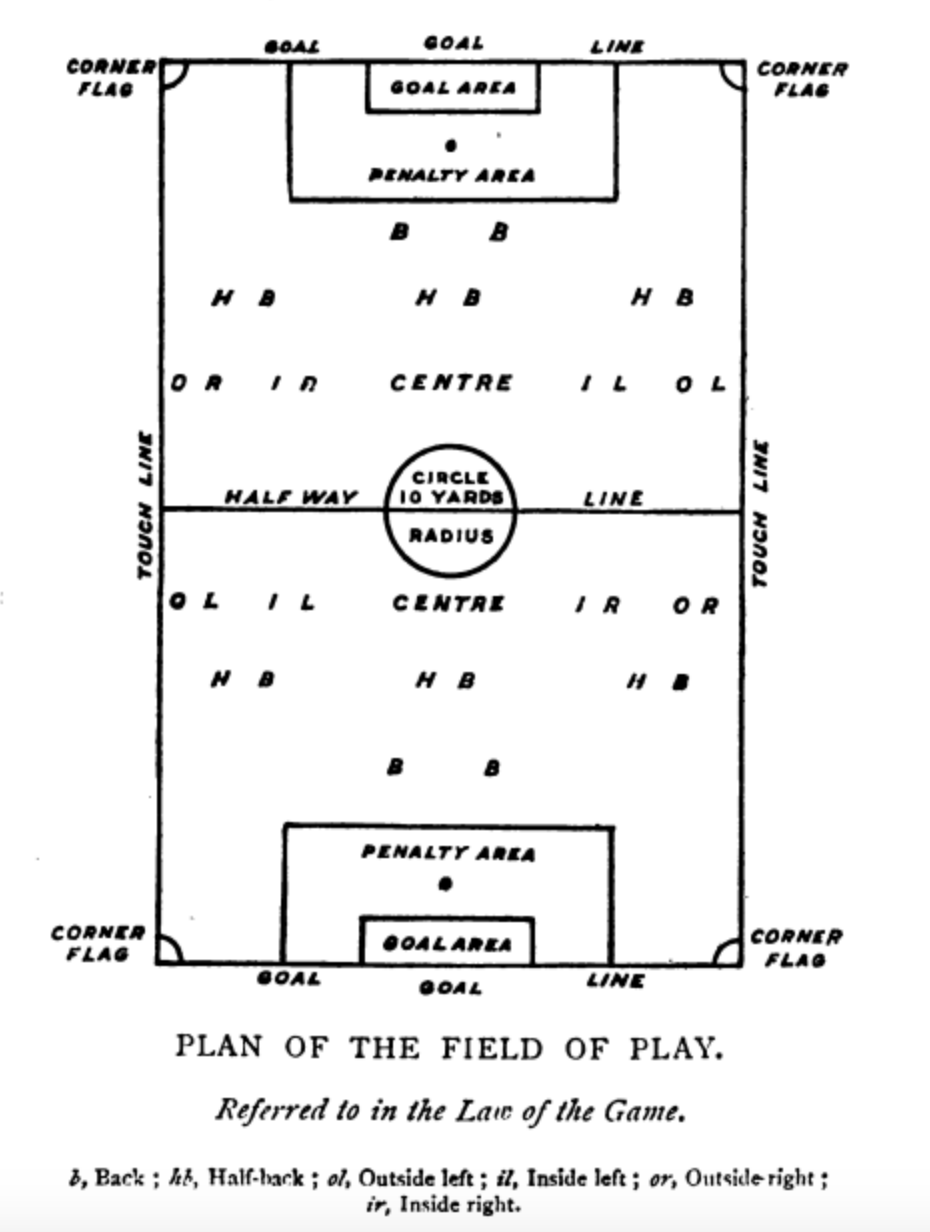
1905

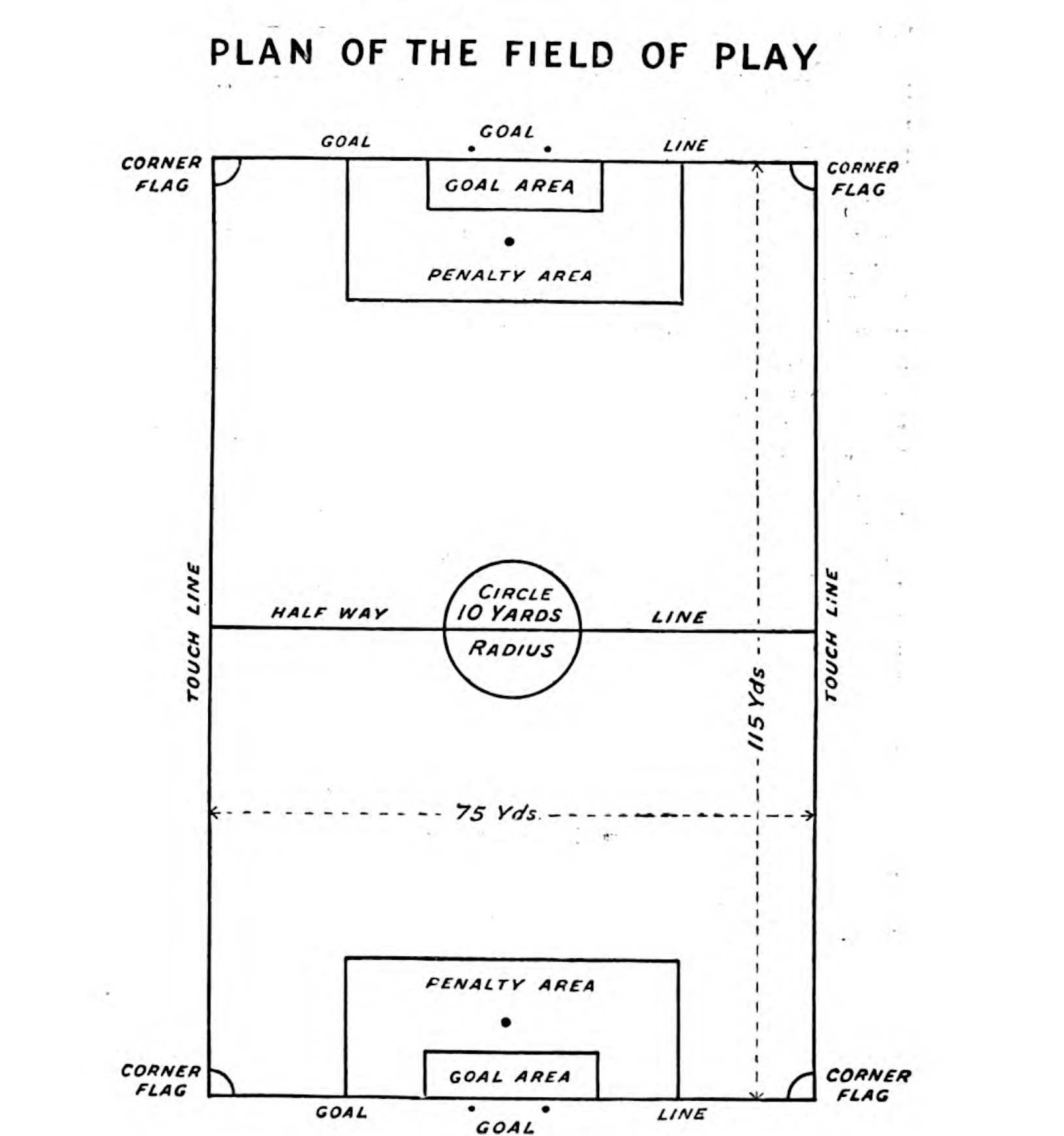
1907

== See also ==
- Football field (for each sport called "football")
- Turf management
- Groundskeeping
