= Football field =

Football field or football pitch may refer to the playing areas of several codes of football:

- American football field
- Australian rules football playing field
- Canadian football field
- Football pitch, for association football (soccer)
- Gaelic football playing field
- Rugby league playing field
- Rugby union playing field

== See also ==
- Football field (length), an unusual unit of length
- Football field (area), an unusual measure of area
