= One Scotland Gazetteer =

The One Scotland Gazetteer is the definitive national land, property and address dataset for Scotland that is published by Spatial Information Service within the Improvement Service. It is compiled using information from all 32 Scottish councils and produced to common standards and specification. It is not to be confused with the Royal Mail Postcode Address File (PAF) which is only a list of mail delivery locations.

The Improvement Service Spatial Information Service also manages Tellmescotland ( portal for accessing public information notices issued by local authorities across Scotland) and the Spatial Hub - which compiles and publishes other local authority spatial datasets.

== History ==
In 2000, the Scottish Executive (now Scottish Government) set up a Modernising Government Fund to improve public services. In 2002 a proposal was made around Definitive National Addressing for Scotland (DNA Scotland), with all 32 Scottish councils involved. The project was aimed at producing common standards and to establish corporate address gazetteers within each local authority. The gazetteer began in 2003 as the National Gazetteer for Scotland. In 2007 it was renamed to 'One Scotland Gazetteer' and was relaunched with a refreshed website design in late 2017.

The One Scotland Gazetteer is used by the wider Scottish public sector inc.for eDevelopment (Planning & Building Standards), The Energy Saving Trust (for energy performance certificates) and for the National Landlord Registration Scheme.

The dataset also feeds into Ordnance Survey's AddressBase dataset via Geoplace who compile the address gazetteers from all 353 English, 22 Welsh and 32 Scottish local authorities.

== Standards ==
Local Authorities have statutory obligations in regard to planning, building standards and street naming and numbering in Scotland They are the source of definitive address information in their local government area and also the source of any change intelligence about land or property.

The INSPIRE Directive of the European Union came into force in 2007, which introduced formal requirements around Spatial data infrastructure, which the Scottish Parliament then legislated for in 2009.

Data from the One Scotland Gazetteer compiles with the BS7666 standard.
