= Edmund Bohun =

English writer

Edmund Bohun (1645–1699) was an English writer on history and politics, a publicist in the Tory interest.

== Life ==
=== Great Britain ===
Coat of Arms of Edmund Bohun

Edmund Bohun was born on March 12, 1644/5 in Ringsfield, Suffolk, England. He was educated at Queens' College, Cambridge. He married Mary Brampton (d. 1719) on July 26, 1669. They had a single child, Nicholas (1679-1718) who died in Carolina.

In the late 1660s, Bohun became associated with William Sancroft, Samuel Parker and Leoline Jenkins, in a group of High Church proto-Tory thinkers. He began to write against the Whigs after the Exclusion Crisis of the 1680s. He attacked Whig theories and in particular Algernon Sidney in his Defence of Sir Robert Filmer (1684). Sancroft asked Bohun to edit Robert Filmer’s works, for an edition of 1685, and its preface Bohun attacked James Tyrrell.

In reply to Jeremy Collier's The Desertion discuss'd in a Letter to a Country Gentleman (1688), Bohun wrote The History of the Desertion (1690), bringing forward an argument influential for Tories who (unlike Collier) were prepared to swear allegiance after the Glorious Revolution; this work was the first history written of the events in which James II of England left the throne. He drew on the work of Grotius, in De Jure Belli ac Pacis, for the idea of conquest after a just war as applicable to the contemporary United Kingdom, as was also done by William King.

In 1692, Bohun was appointed Licenser of the Press, a position as pre-publication censor. He ran into trouble in the case of an anonymous pamphlet called, King William and Queen Mary Conquerors which was really by Charles Blount. It argued a case similar to Bohun's own views. Thomas Babington Macaulay claimed that the Whig Blount in writing it deliberately set out to entrap the unpopular Bohun, but this is no longer accepted. In a House of Commons debate in 1693, Tories defending Bohun pointed out that the bishops Gilbert Burnet and William Lloyd had published similar arguments. The outcome was that Bohun lost the position, which was shortly abolished, and Burnet's Pastoral Letter of 1689 was included in a suppression order covering William and Queen Mary Conquerors. Bohun was briefly imprisoned, and after a two-year renewal of the Press Act providing for a Licenser as censor to 1695, the pre-publication censorship of the press was allowed by Parliament to lapse.

=== America ===
He emigrated to Carolina, becoming in 1698 the first recorded Chief Justice of (south) Carolina there, based in Charleston.

On October 5, 1699, Bohun died of Yellow Fever.

In 1885, Bohun's diary and autobiography were published by S. Wilton Rix.

== Works ==
- An Address to the Free-men and Free-holders of the Nation. 1682. OCLC 65328399. ProQuest 2264195044, 2248546800, 2248541925.
- A Defence of Sir Robert Filmer, against the Mistakes and Misrepresentations of Algernon Sidney, Esq. in a Paper Delivered by Him to the Sheriffs upon the Scaffold on Tower-Hill, on Fryday December the 7th 1683 before His Execution there. 1684.
- A Geographical Dictionary, Representing the Present and Ancient Names of All the Countries, Provinces, Remarkable Cities, Universities, Ports, Towns, Mountains, Seas, Streights, Fountains, and Rivers of the Whole World: Their Distances, Longitudes and Latitudes. With a Short Historical Account of the Same; and Their Present State: To which is Added an Index of the Ancient and Latin Names. Very Necessary for the Right Understanding of All Modern Histories, and Especially the Divers Accounts of the Present Transactions of Europe. London: Printed for Charles Brome, at the Gun, at the west-end of St. Pauls. 1688. OCLC 78703528.
- The History of the Desertion, or, An Account of All the Publick Affairs in England, from the Beginning of September 1688, to the Twelfth of February following with an Answer to a Piece Call'd The Desertion Discussed, in a Letter to a Country Gentleman. 1690.
- The Character of Queen Elizabeth, or, A Full and Clear Account of Her Policies, and the Methods of Her Government both in Church and State: Her Virtue and Defects, together with the Characters of Her Principal Ministers of State, and the Greatest Part of the Affairs and Events that Happened in Her Times. 1693.
- The Justice of Peace, His Calling and Qualifications. 1693.
