= William Mackenzie (publisher) =

British publisher

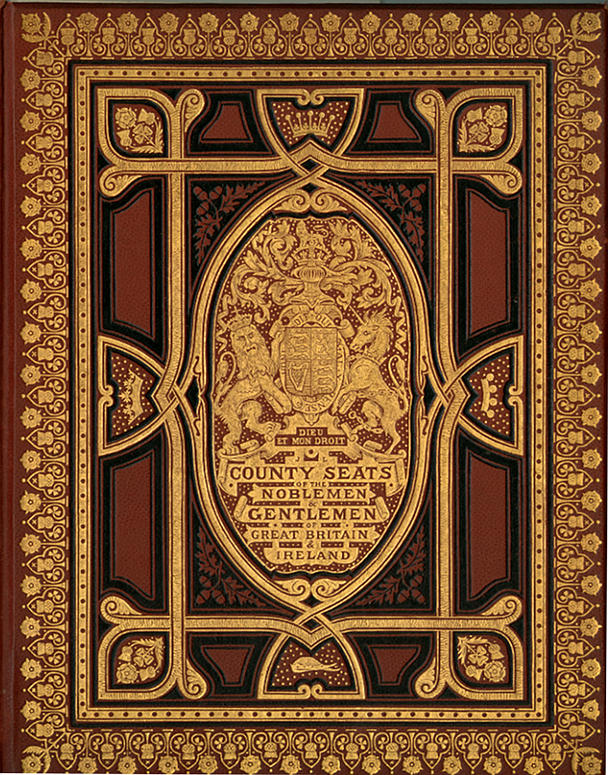
County Seats of The Noblemen and Gentlemen of Great Britain and Ireland (1870)

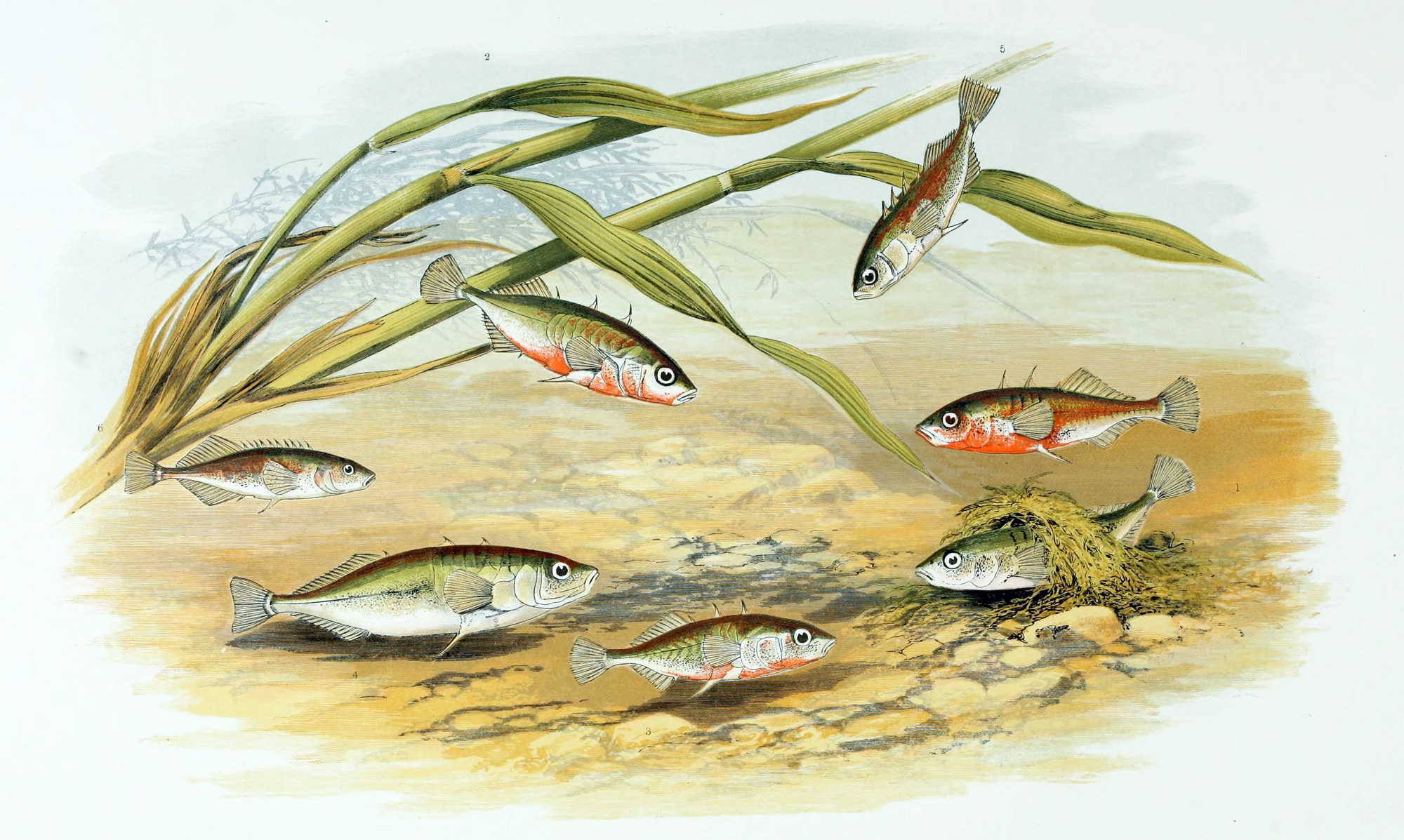
Three-spined stickleback from British Fresh Water Fishes

William Mackenzie (of Ludgate Hill, Edinburgh and Dublin) was a well-known Scottish publisher in the mid to late 1800s. He published works by the trio of Francis Orpen Morris, Benjamin Fawcett and Alexander Francis Lydon. Some of his prints were commissioned by the Royal Agricultural Society of England. He was most active in publishing from 1866 to 1895.

In 1859, he was awarded a patent for the invention of "An Improved Method Of Printing Impressions Upon An Enlarged Or Reduced Scale, Either From Engraved Plates, Electrotypes, Blocks, Drawings, Or Other Surfaces". According to The British & Colonial Printer and Stationer, Mackenzie "had an enormous business, their Family Bibles, Home Preachers and other books of a devotional nature being known all the world over. In Scotland, at least, no home was considered completely furnished unless one of Mackenzie's Family Bibles lay upon the parlour table".

== Selected books published ==
- British Fresh Water Fishes
- County Seats of The Noblemen and Gentlemen of Great Britain and Ireland
- Wilson's Tales of the Borders and of Scotland: Historical, Traditionary, and Imaginative
- The National Encyclopedia: A Dictionary of Universal Knowledge
- The Scots Worthies: Their Lives and Testimonies
- Upper Egypt and Ethiopia
- The Museum of Natural History: Being A Popular Account of the Structure, Habits, and Classification of the various Departments of the Animal Kingdom
- The National Burns
- The Illustrated Family Burns
- Chemistry: Theoretical, Practical, and Analytical, As Applies and Relating To The Arts and Manufactures
