= Speculum Britanniae =

1593 chorographical work by John Norden

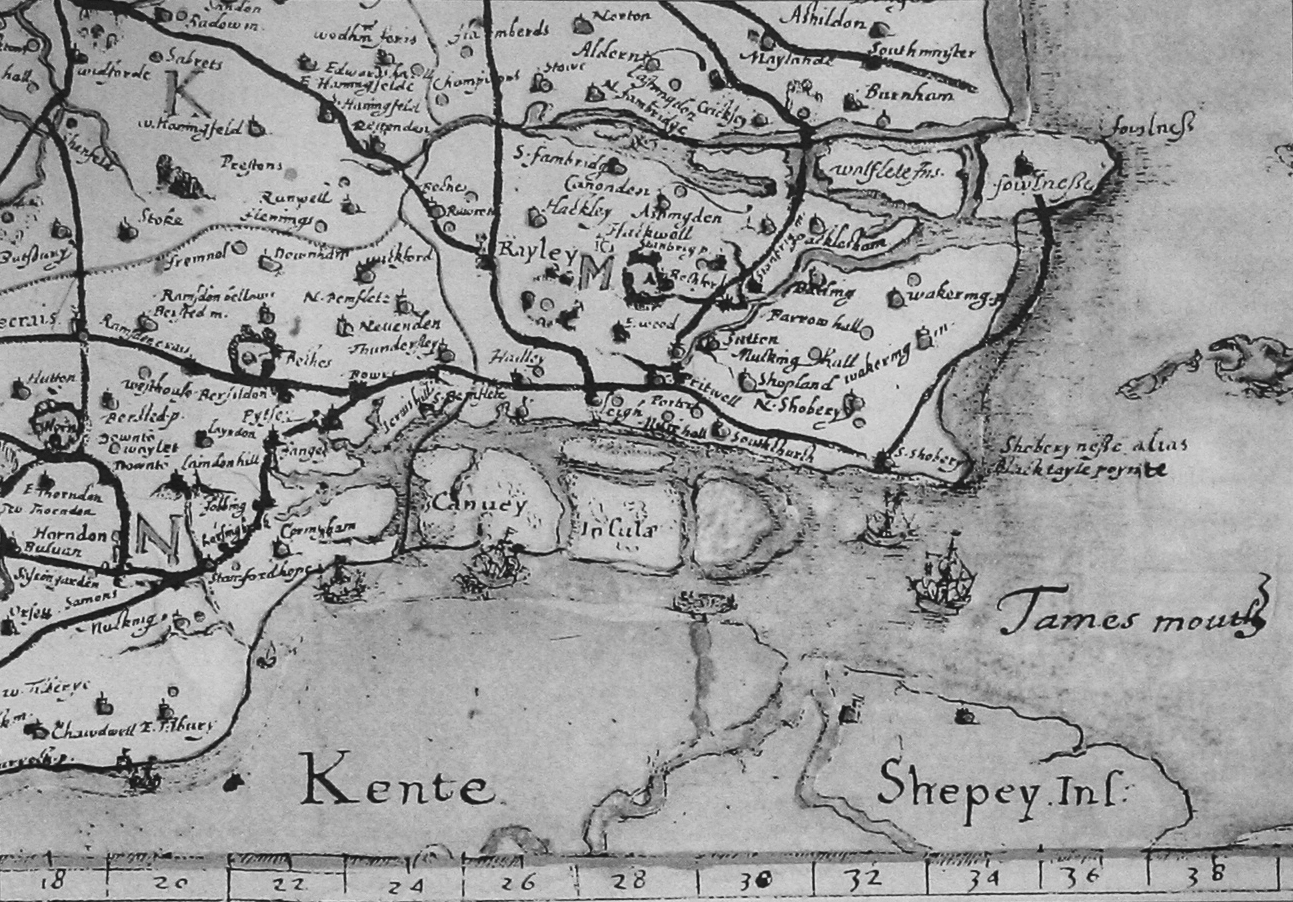
Norden's map of south Essex from the Speculum Britanniae

Speculum Britanniae ("Mirror of Britain"), published in London from 1593, was a projected, but unfinished, chorography of Britain by John Norden (1548–1625). It was intended to take the form of a series of county maps, accompanied by place-by-place written descriptions. Norden was primarily a surveyor and cartographer, and the written descriptions always had a subsidiary role, being much slighter than other early county histories. Nevertheless, they were based on direct observation, and Norden recorded much topographical and antiquarian detail of interest, including the heraldry of tombs, and archaeological sites.

The first instalment, Speculum Britanniae: the First Parte: an Historicall, & Chorographicall Discription of Middlesex, was published in 1593. The second, Speculi Britaniae Pars: the Description of Hartfordshire, appeared in 1598. In 1595 Norden wrote a "Chorographical Description" of Middlesex, Essex, Surrey, Sussex, Hampshire, Wight, Guernsey and Jersey, as a presentation manuscript for Queen Elizabeth (now British Library Add. MS 21853), but it remained unpublished. (He did, however, publish maps alone of Surrey, Hampshire, Sussex and probably Kent.) In 1596 he published an explanation and justification of the overall project as Speculum Britanniae: a Preparative to this Work. In 1604, he presented to James I a more expansive description and set of nine maps of Cornwall (later published in 1728). A description of Northamptonshire (which he had surveyed in the 1590s, and is known to have completed in 1610) reached print in 1720; and one of Essex (related to, but distinct from, that in the "Chorographical Description") was eventually published in 1840.

The idea of a work that was a "mirror" of a land or even of a region of thought had given rise to an extensive medieval "mirror literature".
