= John Norden =

British cartographer, chronographer and antiquary (died 1625)

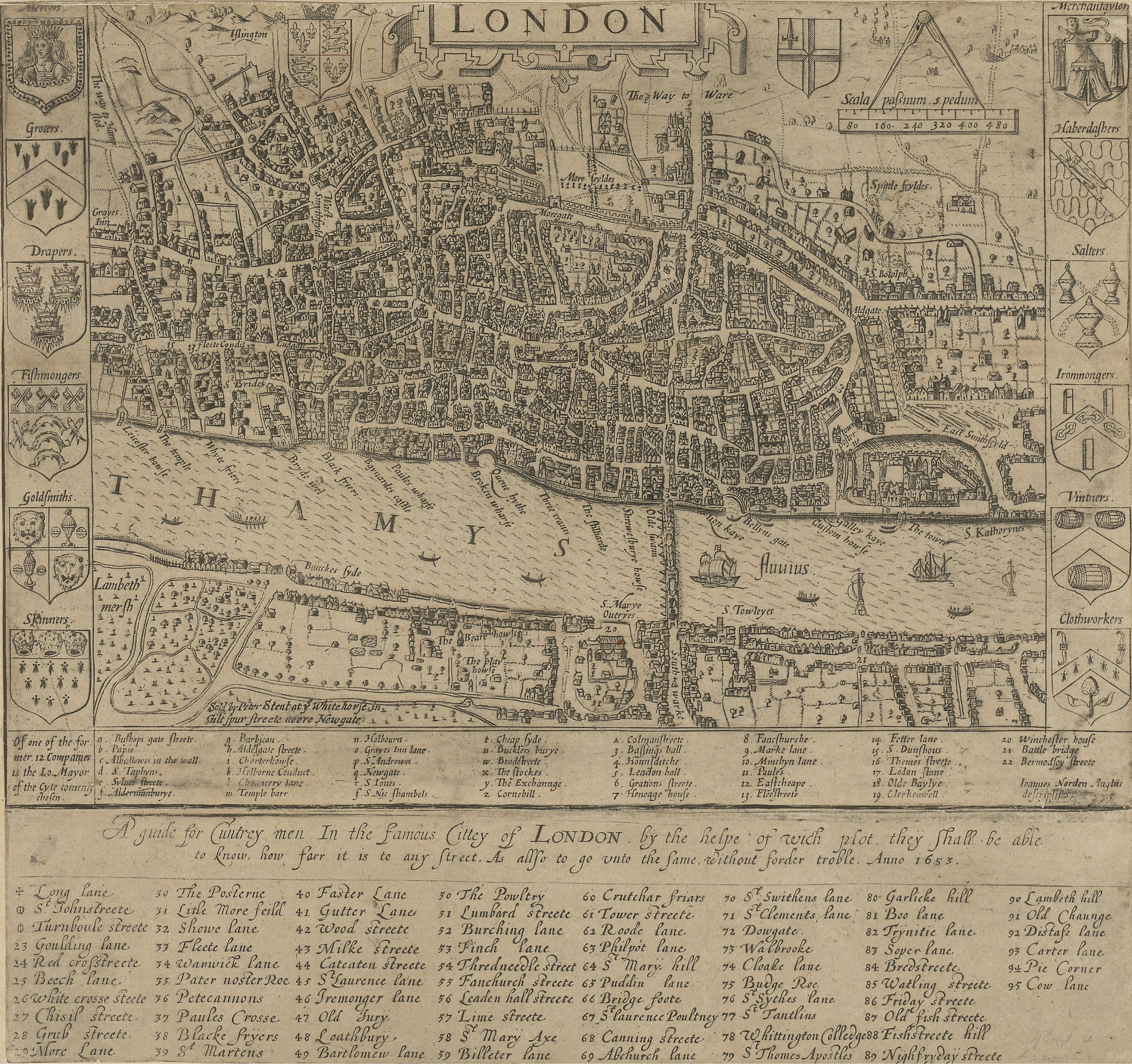
John Norden's map of London in 1593, engraved by Pieter van den Keere. There is only one bridge across the Thames, but parts of Southwark on the south bank of the river have been developed.

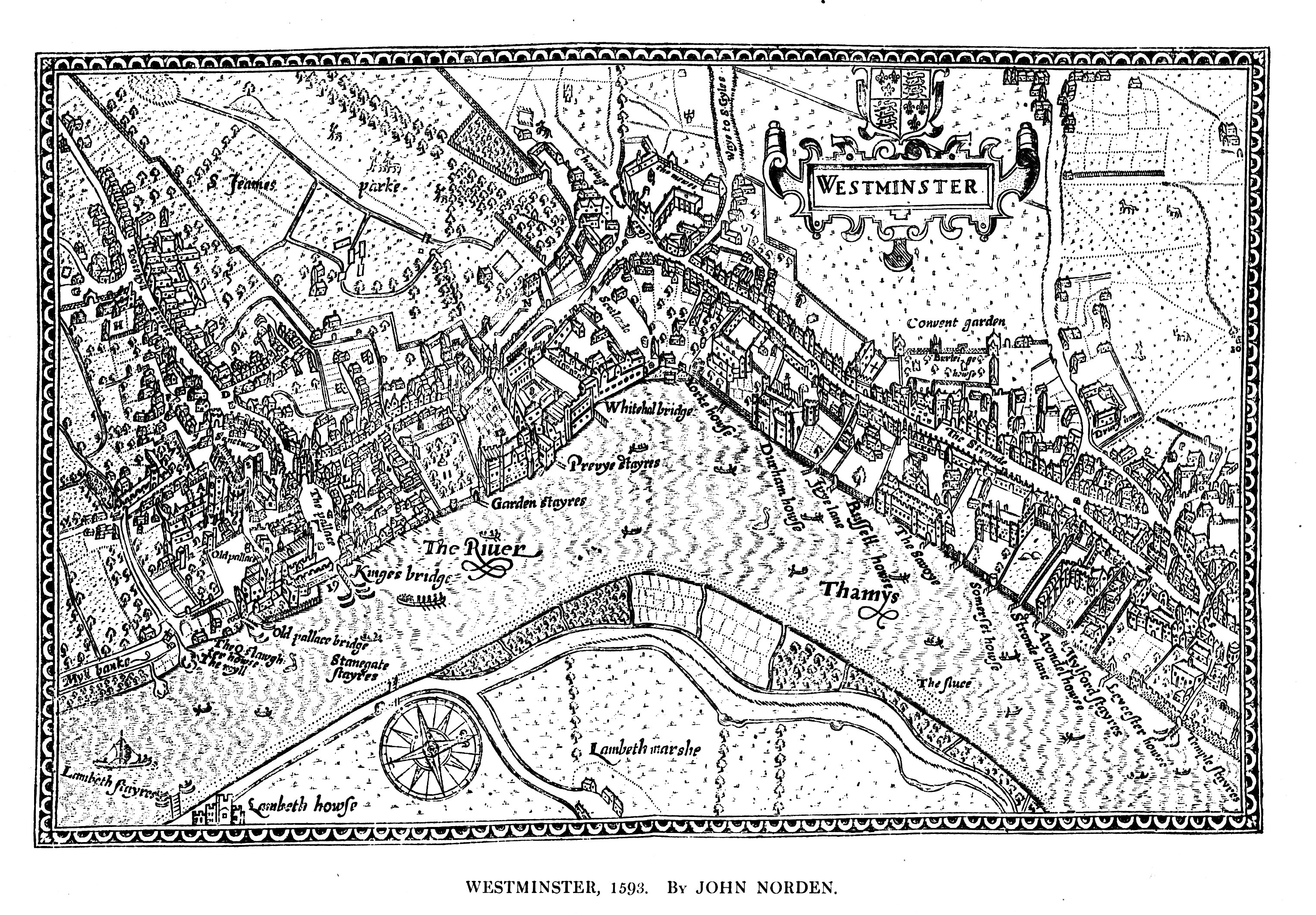
John Norden's map of Westminster, 1593

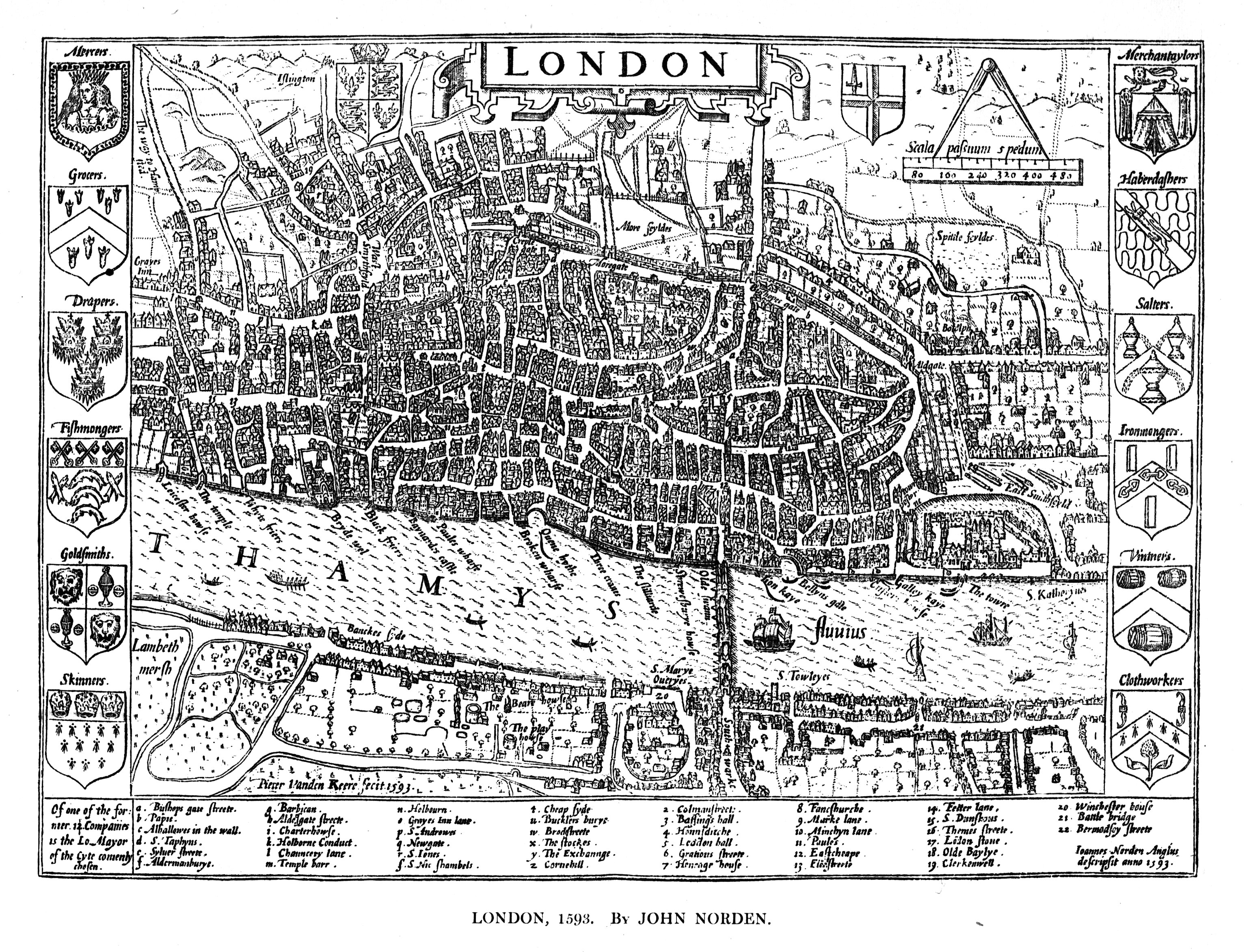
Large version of the London map

John Norden (c. 1547 – 1625) was an English cartographer, chorographer and antiquary. He planned (but did not complete) a series of county maps and accompanying county histories of England, the Speculum Britanniae. He was also a prolific writer of devotional works.

== Life ==
Norden was born in Somerset in 1548, the son of a yeoman, though little is known about his family background. He was educated at Hart Hall, Oxford.

He subsequently led a peripatetic existence, but for much of his life had his home in Middlesex on the outskirts of London: he was living in Walham Green, Middlesex, in 1592; by 1607 he was at Hendon, Middlesex, where he remained until 1619; and in the latter year he moved to the parish of St Giles in the Fields, where he eventually died in 1625. He was married and had at least two sons, John Norden junior, and Josias.

== Chorography and cartography ==
=== The Speculum Britanniae ===
The first instalment of Norden's chorographical project was published in 1593 as the Speculum Britanniae: the First Parte: an Historicall, & Chorographicall Discription of Middlesex. The work formed part of a planned series of county surveys combining maps with descriptive accounts of England. The manuscript in the British Library (Harleian MS 570) includes corrections in the hand of Lord Burleigh, a senior adviser to Queen Elizabeth I.

In 1595 he wrote a manuscript "Chorographical Description" of Middlesex, Essex, Surrey, Sussex, Hampshire, Wight, Guernsey and Jersey, dedicated, and perhaps presented, to Queen Elizabeth (now British Library Add. MS 21853). In 1596 he published his Preparative to the Speculum Britanniae, dedicated to Burleigh. In 1598 there appeared the only other part of the project to reach print in his lifetime, Speculi Britaniae Pars: the Description of Hartfordshire.

He also completed accounts of five other counties in manuscript. Three of these were printed many years after his death: Essex, edited for the Camden Society in 1840 by Sir Henry Ellis from a manuscript at Hatfield House; Northamptonshire, known to have been finished in 1610, but not published until 1720; and Cornwall, likewise finished in 1610, but published in 1728. The other two counties were Kent and Surrey: even the manuscripts for these are now lost, although the Surrey text would presumably have overlapped with that in the "Chorographical Description" of 1595.

=== Later survey work ===
In 1600 Norden was appointed surveyor of the crown woods and forests in Berkshire, Devon, and Surrey; in 1605 he obtained the surveyorship of the Duchy of Cornwall; and in 1607, after a careful survey, he composed his valuable Description of the Honor of Windsor, with fine maps and plans in colour, dedicated to James I. In 1608 he was mainly occupied with the surveying of crown woods, especially in Surrey, Berkshire and Devon, and with the writing of his works on forest culture Considerations touching... raising... of Coppices, and Relation of... Proceedings upon... Commission concerning new forests, to which he added in 1613 his Observations concerning Crown Lands and Woods.

In 1612 he was made surveyor of the royal castles in Kent, Surrey, Sussex, Hampshire, Berkshire, Dorset, Wiltshire, Somerset, Devon and Cornwall; in 1616 and 1617 he appears surveying the soke of Kirketon in Lindsey, as well as various manors and lands belonging to Prince Charles, afterwards Charles I. His last works were a survey of Sheriff Hutton manor, Yorks, in 1624, and England, an intended guide for English travellers, a series of tables to accompany Speed's county maps, executed in 1625, shortly before his death.

=== Cartography ===
Norden's maps of London and Westminster (in his Speculum Britanniae of 1593) are the best representations known of the English metropolis under the Tudors; his maps of Middlesex (also from the Speculum Britanniae of 1593), of Essex (1594), of Hertfordshire (1598) and of Cornwall (published in 1728; see above) are also notable. In the last of these the roads are indicated for the first time in English cartography.

Norden also executed maps of Hampshire, Hertfordshire, Kent, Middlesex, Surrey and Sussex, for the fifth edition (1607) of Camden's Britannia; and maps of Middlesex, Essex, Sussex, Surrey and Cornwall for John Speed (1610).

Several important cartographical works are lost. These include Norden's Map ... of Battles fought in England from ... William the Conqueror to Elizabeth, in 16 sheets, formerly in the Bodleian Gallery, Oxford, of which elements are probably preserved in the Invasions of England, an appendix to Speed's Prospect of the most Famous Parts of the World (1635); and his View of London, in 8 sheets, made c. 1604–6, and View of London Bridge, published in 1624. An earlier View of London by Norden (1600), and an 1804 reprint of the View of London Bridge, are held in the Crace collection at the British Library. A map of Surrey by Norden, said to have been copied by Speed and Kip in Camden's Britannia of 1607, has also disappeared.

== Devotional writings ==
Norden frequently experienced difficulty in finding patronage for his cartographical and chorographical work. A steadier source of income was his devotional writing, of which he published twenty-four volumes between 1582 and his death. A Pensive Mans Practise, first published in 1584, reached more than forty editions in his lifetime.

He always kept the two areas of his professional life quite separate, and when in the late 1590s a series of dedications in his devotional works to the Earl of Essex placed him in political difficulties with Sir Robert Cecil he attempted to deny authorship, claiming that the devotional books were the work of "another of my name ... [a] Norden pretender". This denial has caused historians some difficulty, but Frank Kitchen has established beyond doubt that there was only one John Norden.

== Bibliography ==
- Kitchen, Frank (1997). "John Norden (c1547–1625): estate surveyor, topographer, county mapmaker and devotional writer". Imago Mundi. 49: 43–61. doi:10.1080/03085699708592858.
- Kitchen, Frank (2008) [2004]. "Norden, John (c.1547–1625)". Oxford Dictionary of National Biography (online ed.). Oxford University Press. doi:10.1093/ref:odnb/20250. (Subscription, Wikipedia Library access or UK public library membership required.)
- Mendyk, S. A. E. (1989). "Speculum Britanniae": regional study, antiquarianism and science in Britain to 1700. Toronto: University of Toronto Press. pp. 57–74. ISBN 0-8020-5744-6.
- Ravenhill, William, ed. (1972). John Norden and his maps of Cornwall and its nine hundreds. Exeter: University of Exeter.
