= Ordnance Survey =

National mapping agency for Great Britain

Agency overview
- Formed: 1791; 235 years ago
- Jurisdiction: Great Britain (Note: The Ordnance Survey deals only with maps of Great Britain, and, to an extent, the Isle of Man, but not Northern Ireland, which has its own, separate government agency, the Ordnance Survey of Northern Ireland.)
- Headquarters: Southampton, England, UK; 50.9378°N 1.4713°W OS grid SU 373 155
- Employees: 1,244
- Minister responsible: Liz Kendall, Secretary of State for Science, Innovation and Technology
- Agency executive: Nick Bolton, CEO
- Parent agency: Department for Science, Innovation and Technology
- Website: ordnancesurvey.co.uk

The Ordnance Survey (OS) is the national mapping agency for Great Britain. The agency's name indicates its original military purpose (see ordnance and surveying), which was to map Scotland in the wake of the Jacobite rising of 1745. This work was also driven by a more general and nationwide need in light of the potential threat of invasion during the Napoleonic Wars. Since 1 April 2015, the Ordnance Survey has operated as Ordnance Survey Ltd, a government-owned company, 100% in public ownership. The Ordnance Survey Board remains accountable to the Secretary of State for Science, Innovation and Technology. It was also a member of the Public Data Group.

Paper maps represent only 5% of the company's annual revenue. It produces digital map data, online route planning and sharing services and mobile apps, plus many other location-based products for business, government and consumers. Ordnance Survey mapping is usually classified as either "large-scale" (in other words, more detailed) or "small-scale". The Survey's large-scale mapping comprises 1:2,500 maps for urban areas and 1:10,000 more generally. (The latter superseded the 1:10,560 "six inches to the mile" scale in the 1950s.) These large-scale maps are typically used in professional land-use contexts and were available as sheets until the 1980s, when they were digitised. Small-scale mapping for leisure use includes the 1:25,000 "Explorer" series, the 1:50,000 "Landranger" series and the 1:250,000 road maps. These are still available in traditional sheet form.

Ordnance Survey maps remain in copyright for 50 years after their publication. Some of the copyright libraries hold complete or near-complete collections of pre-digital OS mapping.

== History ==
=== Origins ===
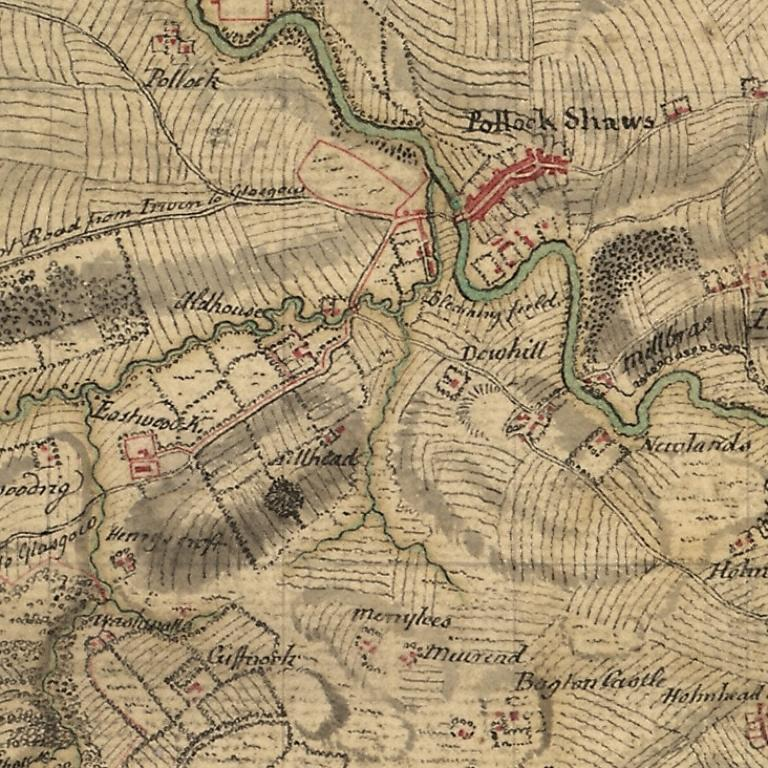
Pollokshaws on Roy's Military Survey of Scotland (1747–1755)

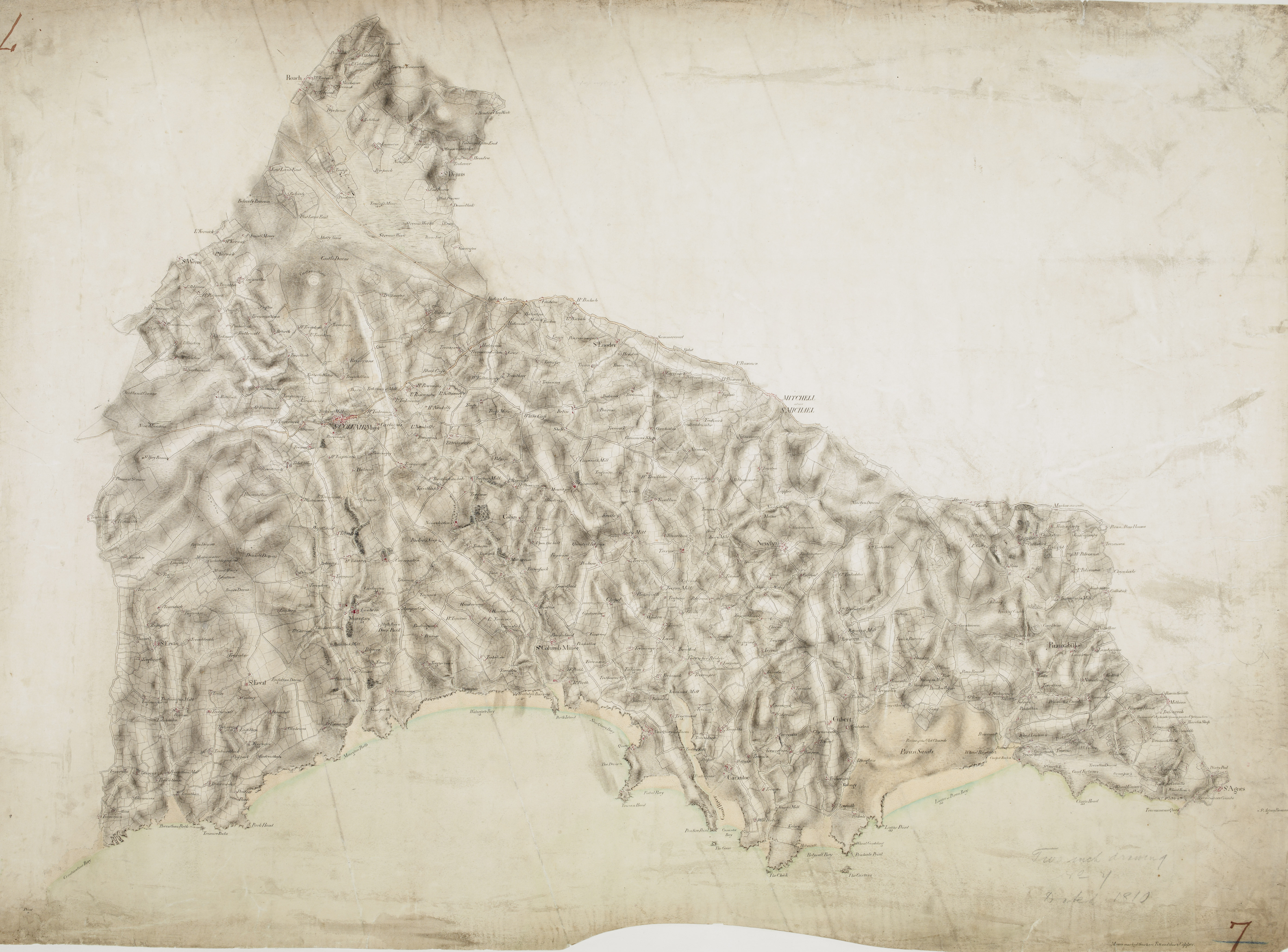
The original 1810 draftsman's drawings for the area around St Columb Major, Cornwall.

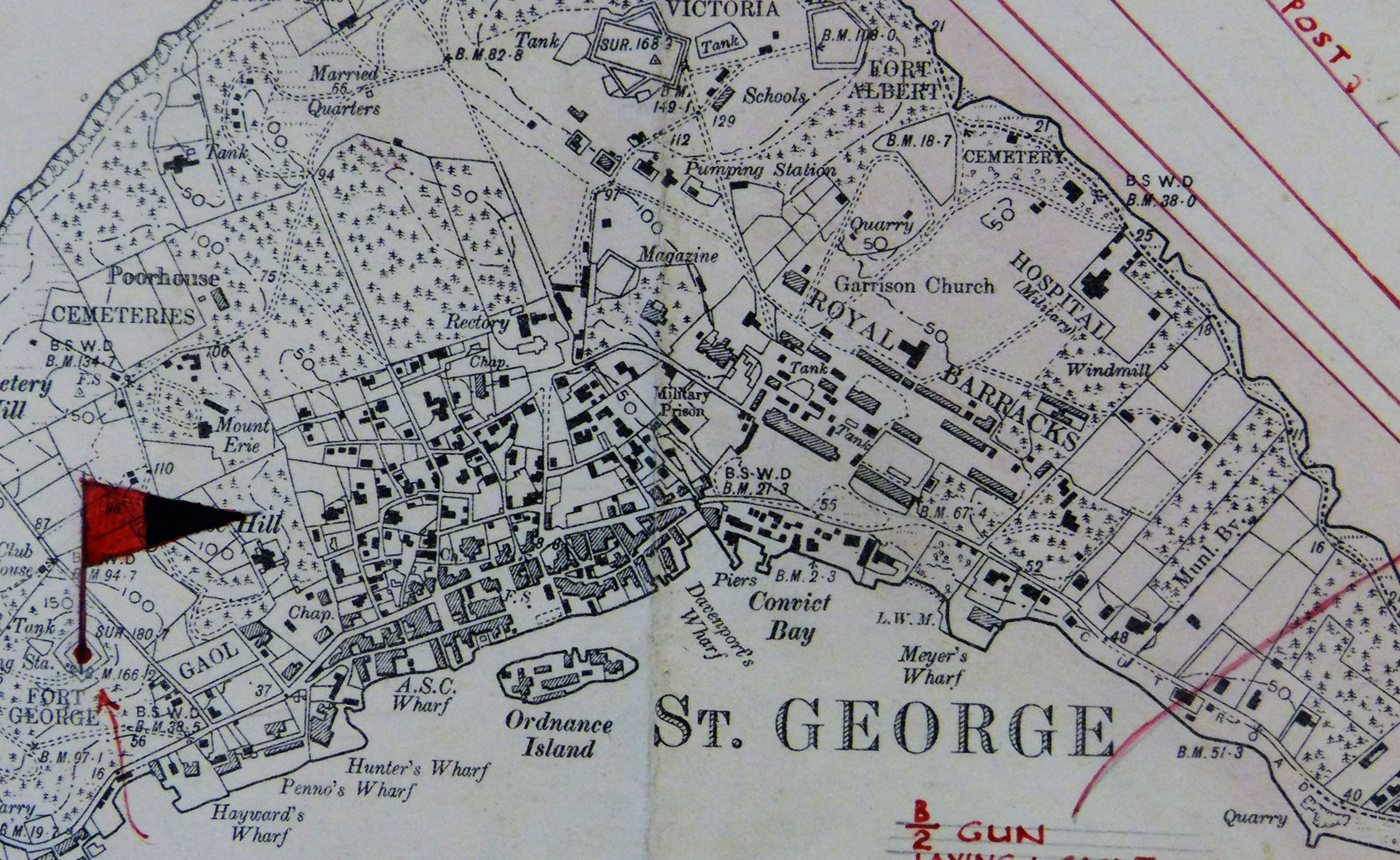
Detail from 1901 Ordnance Survey map of the Imperial fortress colony of Bermuda

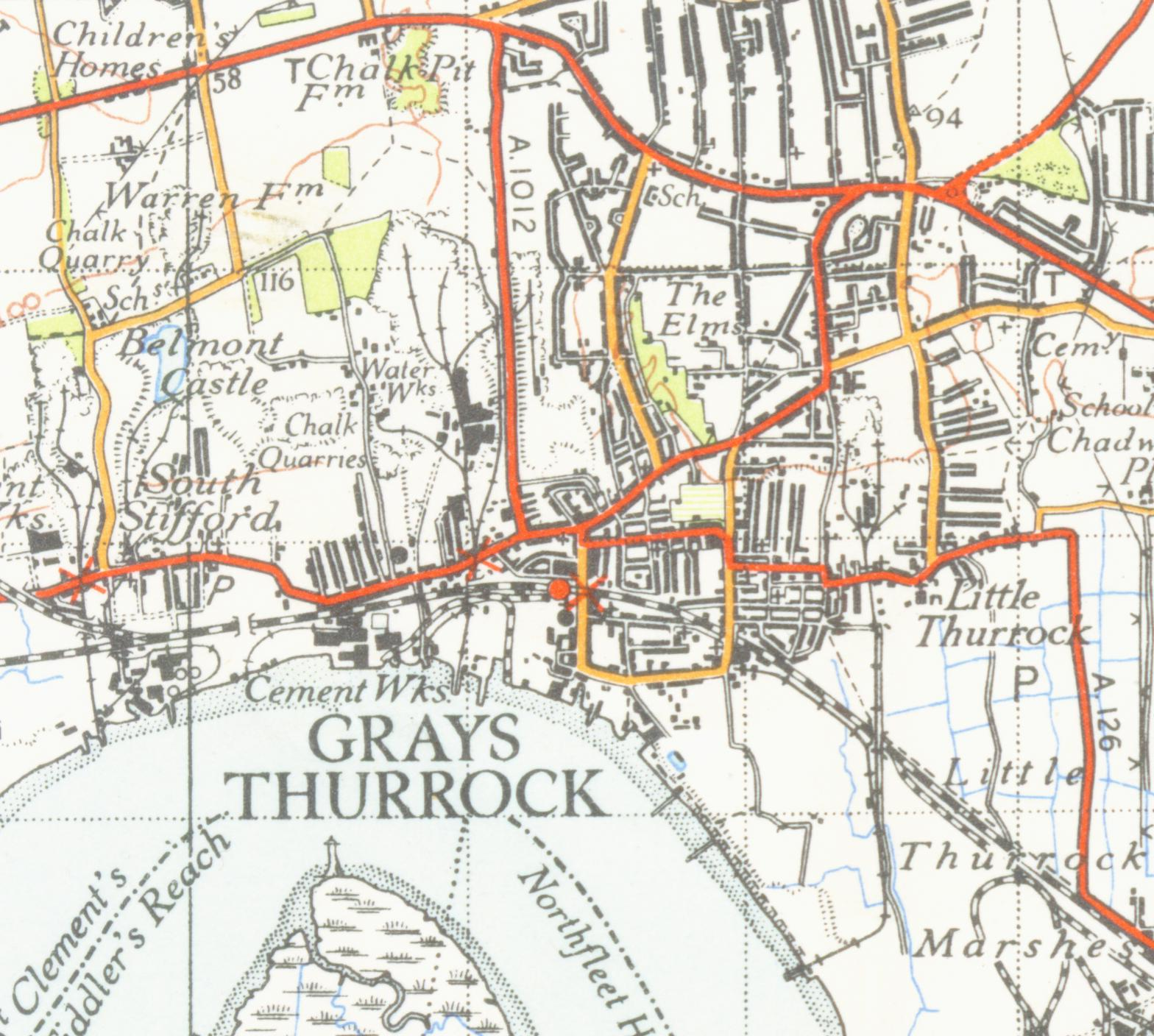
Part of an Ordnance Survey map, at the scale of one inch to the mile, from a New Popular Edition map published in 1946

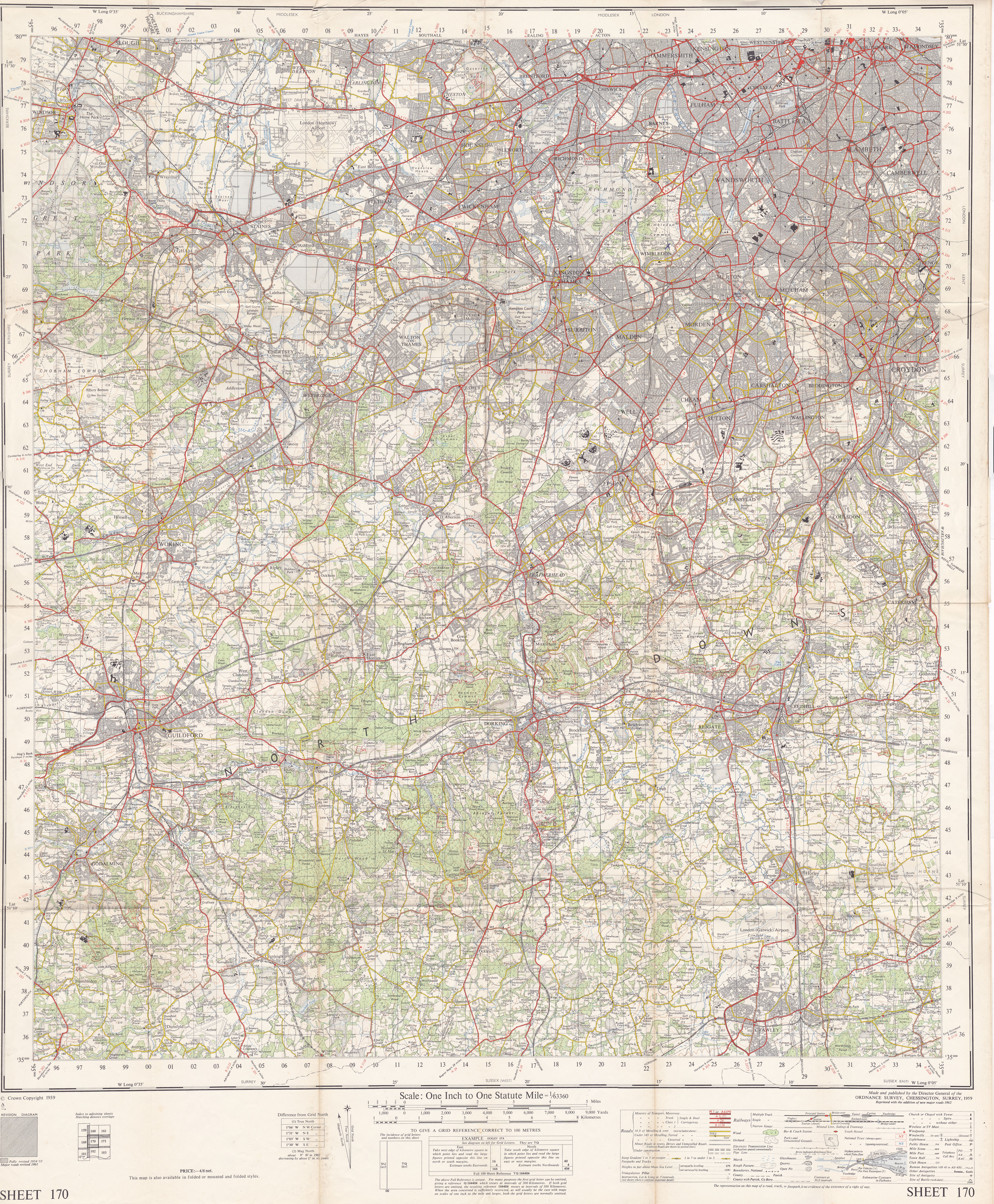
Detailed scan of a complete 7th series sheet

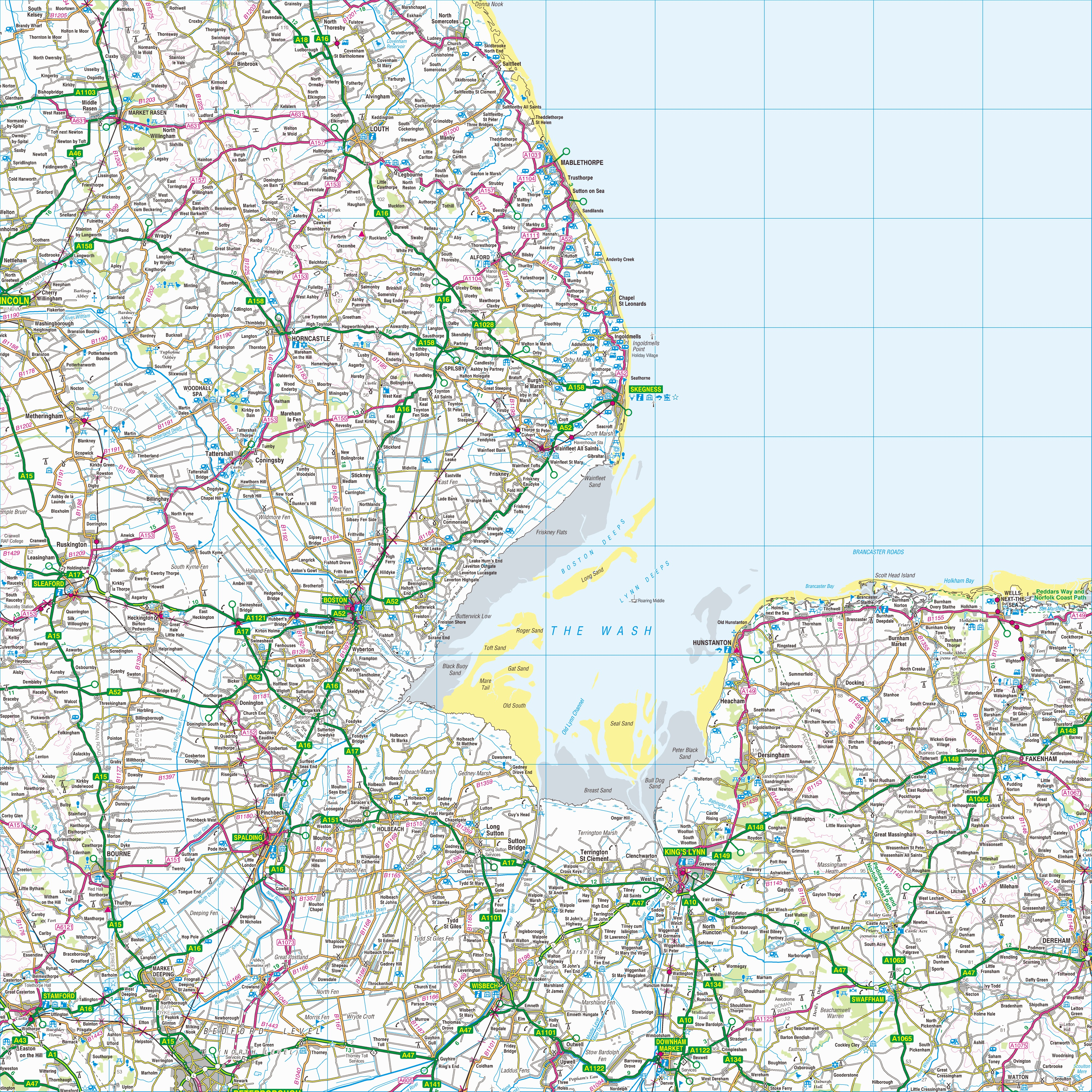
Grid square TF from the Ordnance Survey National Grid at 1:250,000 scale. Shown: the Wash, the North Sea, parts of Lincolnshire, Cambridgeshire and Norfolk.

The origins of the Ordnance Survey lie in the aftermath of the Jacobite rising of 1745. Prince William, Duke of Cumberland realised that the British Army did not have a good map of the Scottish Highlands to locate Jacobite dissenters such as Simon Fraser, 11th Lord Lovat so that they could be put on trial. In 1747, Lieutenant-Colonel David Watson proposed the compilation of a map of the Highlands to help in pacifying the region. In response, King George II charged Watson with making a military survey of the Highlands under the command of the Duke of Cumberland. Among Watson's assistants were William Roy, Paul Sandby and John Manson. The survey was produced at a scale of 1 inch to 1,000 yards (1:36,000) and included "the Duke of Cumberland's Map" (primarily by Watson and Roy), now held in the British Library.

Roy later had an illustrious career in the Royal Engineers (RE), rising to the rank of General, and he was largely responsible for the British share of the work in determining the relative positions of the French and British royal observatories. This work was the starting point of the Principal Triangulation of Great Britain (1783–1853), and led to the creation of the Ordnance Survey itself. Roy's technical skills and leadership set the high standard for which the Ordnance Survey became known. Work was begun in earnest in 1790 under Roy's supervision, when the Board of Ordnance (a predecessor of part of the modern Ministry of Defence) began a national military survey starting with the south coast of England. Roy's birthplace near Carluke in South Lanarkshire is today marked by a memorial in the form of a large OS trig point.

By 1791, the Board received the newer Ramsden theodolite (an improved successor to the one that Roy had used in 1784), and work began on mapping southern Great Britain using a 5 mi (8 km) baseline on Hounslow Heath that Roy himself had previously measured; it crosses the present Heathrow Airport. In 1991, Royal Mail marked the bicentenary by issuing a set of postage stamps featuring maps of the Kentish village of Hamstreet.

In 1801, the first one-inch-to-the-mile (1:63,360 scale) map was published, detailing the county of Kent, with Essex following shortly afterwards. The Kent map was published privately and stopped at the county border, while the Essex maps were published by the Ordnance Survey and ignored the county border, setting the trend for future Ordnance Survey maps.

During the next 20 years, about a third of England and Wales was mapped at the same scale (see Principal Triangulation of Great Britain) under the direction of William Mudge, as other military matters took precedence. It took until 1823 to re-establish the relationship with the French survey made by Roy in 1787. By 1810, one-inch-to-the-mile maps of most of the south of England were completed, but they were withdrawn from sale between 1811 and 1816 because of security fears. By 1840, the one-inch survey had covered all of Wales and all but the six northernmost counties of England.

Surveying was hard work. For instance, Major Thomas Colby, the longest-serving Director General of the Ordnance Survey, walked 586 mi (943 km) in 22 days on a reconnaissance in 1819. In 1824, Colby and most of his staff moved to Ireland to work on a six-inches-to-the-mile (1:10,560) valuation survey. The survey of Ireland, county by county, was completed in 1846. The suspicions and tensions it caused in rural Ireland are the subject of Brian Friel's play Translations, written in 1980.

Colby was not only involved in the design of specialist measuring equipment. He also established a systematic collection of place names, and reorganised the map-making process to produce clear, accurate plans. Place names were recorded in "Name Books", a system first used in Ireland. The instructions for their use were:

The persons employed on the survey are to endeavour to obtain the correct orthography of the names of places by diligently consulting the best authorities within their reach. The name of each place is to be inserted as it is commonly spelt, in the first column of the name book and the various modes of spelling it used in books, writings &c. are to be inserted in the second column, with the authority placed in the third column opposite to each.

Whilst these procedures generally produced excellent results, mistakes were made, for instance, the Pilgrims' Way in the North Downs labelled the wrong route, but the name stuck. Similarly, the spelling of Scafell and Scafell Pike copied an error on an earlier map, and was retained as this was the name of a corner of one of the Principal Triangles, despite "Scawfell" being the almost universal form at the time. Colby believed in leading from the front, travelling with his men, helping to build camps and, as each survey session drew to a close, arranging mountain-top parties with enormous plum puddings.

The British Geological Survey was founded in 1835 as the Ordnance Geological Survey under Henry De la Beche, and remained a branch of the Ordnance Survey until 1965. At the same time, the uneven quality of the English and Scottish maps was being improved by engravers under Benjamin Baker. By the time Colby retired in 1846, the production of six-inch maps of Ireland was complete. This had led to a demand for similar treatment in England, and work was proceeding on extending the six-inch map to northern England, but only a three-inch scale for most of Scotland.

Survey Act 1870 (Note: Section 1.)
- Act of Parliament
- Parliament of the United Kingdom
- Long title: An Act to amend the Law relating to the Surveys of Great Britain, Ireland, and the Isle of Man.
- Citation: 33 & 34 Vict. c. 13
- Territorial extent: United Kingdom; Isle of Man; (Note: Section 2.)

Dates
- Royal assent: 12 May 1870
- Commencement: 12 May 1870 (Note: The Acts of Parliament (Commencement) Act 1793.)
- Repealed: 16 November 1989
Other legislation
Repeals/revokes	Military Survey (Ireland) Act 1805
Amended by	Statute Law Revision Act 1883; Statute Law (Repeals) Act 1977
Repealed by	Statute Law (Repeals) Act 1989

Status: Repealed

Text of statute as originally enacted

When Colby retired, he recommended William Yolland as his successor, but he was considered too young and the less experienced Lewis Alexander Hall was appointed. After a fire in the Tower of London, the headquarters of the survey was moved to Southampton taking over buildings previously occupied by a military orphanage (the Royal Military Asylum) in 1841, and Yolland was put in charge, but Hall sent him off to Ireland so that when Hall left in 1854 Yolland was again passed over in favour of Major Henry James. Hall was enthusiastic about extending the survey of the north of England to a scale of 1:2,500. In 1855, the Board of Ordnance was abolished, and the Ordnance Survey was placed under the War Office together with the Topographical Survey and the Depot of Military Knowledge. Eventually in 1870 it was transferred to the Office of Works.

The primary triangulation of the United Kingdom of Roy, Mudge and Yolland was completed by 1841, but was greatly improved by Alexander Ross Clarke who completed a new survey based on Airy's spheroid in 1858, completing the Principal Triangulation. The following year, he completed an initial levelling of the country.

=== Great Britain "County Series" ===
Ordnance Survey Act 1841 (Note: The citation of this act by this short title was authorised by section 1 of, and the first schedule to, the Short Titles Act 1896. Due to the repeal of those provisions it is now authorised by section 19(2) of the Interpretation Act 1978.)
- Act of Parliament
- Parliament of the United Kingdom
- Long title: An Act to authorize and facilitate the Completion of a Survey of Great Britain, Berwick upon Tweed, and the Isle of Man.
- Citation: 4 & 5 Vict. c. 30
- Territorial extent: United Kingdom

Dates
- Royal assent: 21 June 1841
- Commencement: 21 June 1841
Other legislation
Amended by	Survey Act 1856; Statute Law Revision Act 1874 (No. 2); Summary Jurisdiction Act 1884; Statute Law Revision (No. 2) Act 1890; Statute Law Revision Act 1892; Public Authorities Protection Act 1893; Courts Act 1971; Criminal Damage Act 1971; Sheriff Courts (Scotland) Act 1971; Local Government Act 1972; Criminal Procedure (Scotland) Act 1975; Criminal Law Act 1977; Criminal Justice Act 1982; Statute Law (Repeals) Act 1993; Courts Act 2003

Status: Partially repealed

Text of statute as originally enacted

Revised text of statute as amended

Text of the Ordnance Survey Act 1841 as in force today (including any amendments) within the United Kingdom, from legislation.gov.uk.

Part of a hand-coloured OS 1:2500 first edition (County Series) Staffordshire LXX.12 sheet, surveyed and published in 1882

After the Ordnance Survey published its first large-scale maps of Ireland in the mid-1830s, the Tithe Act 1836 (6 & 7 Will. 4. c. 71) led to calls for a similar six-inch to the mile survey in England and Wales. Official procrastination followed, but the development of the railways added to pressure that resulted in the Ordnance Survey Act 1841 (4 & 5 Vict. c. 30). This granted a right to enter property for the purpose of the survey. Following a fire at its headquarters at the Tower of London in 1841 the Ordnance Survey relocated to a site in Southampton and was in disarray for several years, with arguments about which scales to use. Major-General Sir Henry James was by then Director General, and he saw how photography could be used to make maps of various scales cheaply and easily. He developed and exploited photozincography, not only to reduce the costs of map production but also to publish facsimiles of nationally important manuscripts. Between 1861 and 1864, a facsimile of the Domesday Book was issued, county by county; and a facsimile of the Gough Map was issued in 1870.

From the 1840s, the Ordnance Survey concentrated on the Great Britain "County Series", modelled on the earlier Ireland survey. A start was made on mapping the whole country, county by county, at six inches to the mile (1:10,560). In 1854, "twenty-five inch" maps were introduced with a scale of 1:2500 (25.344 inches to the mile) and the six-inch maps were then based on these twenty-five-inch maps. The first edition of the two scales was completed by the 1890s, with a second edition completed in the 1890s and 1900s. From 1907 till the early 1940s, a third edition (or "second revision") was begun but never completed: only areas with significant changes on the ground were revised, many two or three times. Meanwhile, publication of the one-inch to the mile series for Great Britain was completed in 1891.

"The first edition Ordnance Survey 25-inch, a miracle of cartography, tries to depict every non-woodland tree... These wonderful maps are the zenith of cartography in the British Isles. They should form the base for any study of modern woodland topography. Recent OS maps cannot compare in detail or accuracy with those of a century ago."

— Oliver Rackham, Trees and Woodland in the British Landscape (1990)

From the late 19th century to the early 1940s, the OS produced many "restricted" versions of the County Series maps and other War Department sheets for War Office purposes, in a variety of large scales that included details of military significance such as dockyards, naval installations, fortifications and military camps. Apart from a brief period during the disarmament talks of the 1930s, these areas were left blank or incomplete on standard maps. The War Department 1:2500s, unlike the standard issue, were contoured. The de-classified sheets have now been deposited in some of the Copyright Libraries, helping to complete the map-picture of pre-Second World War Britain.

=== City and town mapping, 19th and early 20th century ===
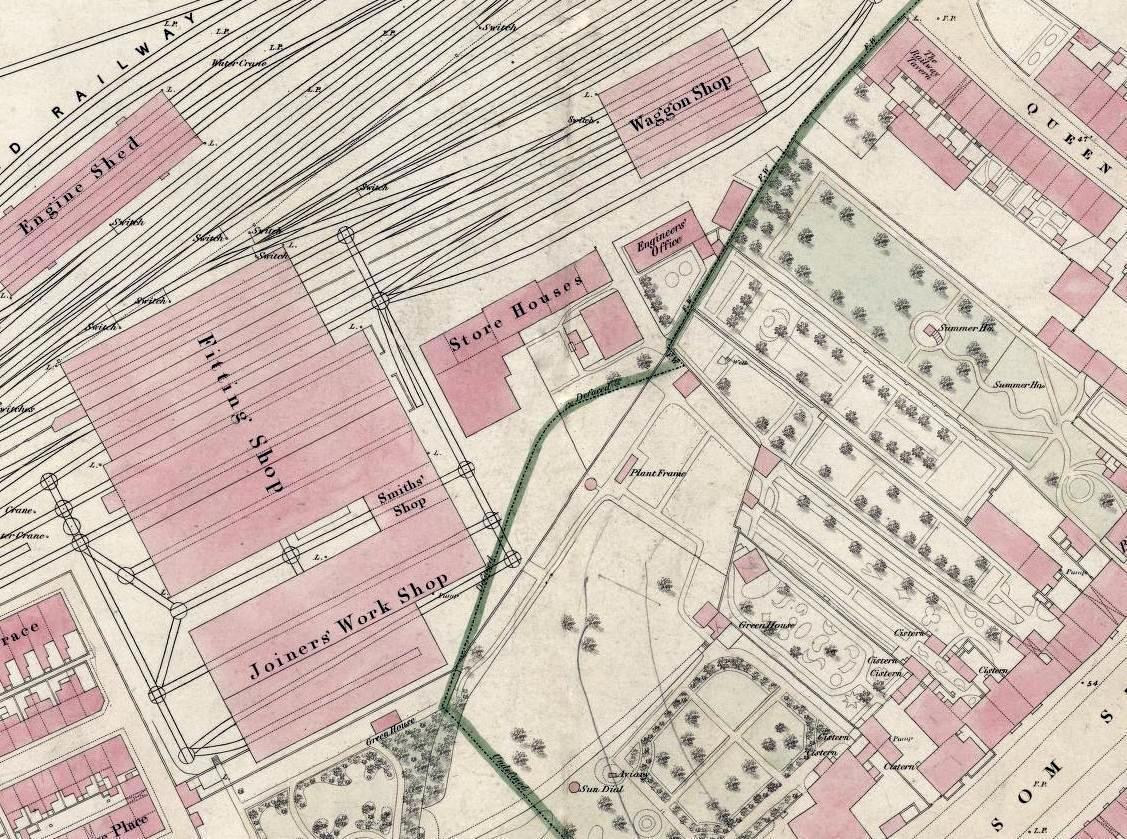
Part of a hand-coloured Sheet 11, Ordnance Survey town plan of York, at 1:1056 (5 ft to 1 mile), surveyed and engraved in 1851

From 1824, the OS began a 6-inch (1:10,560) survey of Ireland for taxation purposes but found this to be inadequate for urban areas and adopted the five-foot scale (1:1056) for Irish cities and towns. From 1840, the six-inch standard was adopted in Great Britain for the un-surveyed northern counties and the 1:1056 scale also began to be adopted for urban surveys. Between 1842 and 1895, some 400 towns were mapped at 1:500 (126 inches), 1:528 (120 inches, "10 foot scale") or 1:1056 (60 inches), with the remaining towns mapped at 1:2500 (~25 inches). In 1855, the Treasury authorised funding for 1:2500 for rural areas and 1:500 for urban areas. The 1:500 scale was considered more 'rational' than 1:528 and became known as the "sanitary scale" since its primary purpose was to support establishment of mains sewerage and water supply. However, a review of the Ordnance Survey in 1892 found that sales of the 1:500 series maps were very poor and the Treasury declined to fund their continuing maintenance, declaring that any revision or new mapping at this scale must be self-financing. Very few towns and cities saw a second edition of the town plans: by 1909 only fourteen places had paid for updates. The review determined that revision of 1:2500 mapping should proceed apace.

The most detailed mapping of London was the OS's 1:1056 survey between 1862 and 1872, which took 326 sheets to cover the capital; a second edition (which needed 759 sheets because of urban expansion) was completed and brought out between 1891 and 1895. London was unusual in that land registration on transfer of title was made compulsory there in 1900. The 1:1056 sheets were partially revised to provide a basis for HM Land Registry index maps and the OS mapped the whole London County Council area (at 1:1056) at national expense. Placenames from the second edition were used in 2016 by the GB1900 project to crowd-source an open-licensed gazetteer of Great Britain.

From 1911 onwards – and mainly between 1911 and 1913 – the Ordnance Survey photo-enlarged many 1:2500 sheets covering built-up areas to 1:1250 (50.688 inches to the mile) for Land Valuation and Inland Revenue purposes: the increased scale was to provide space for annotations. About a quarter of these 1:1250s were marked "Partially revised 1912/13". In areas where there were no further 1:2500s, these partially revised "fifty inch" sheets represent the last large-scale revision (larger than six-inch) of the County Series. The County Series mapping was superseded by the Ordnance Survey National Grid 1:1250s, 1:2500s and 1:10,560s after the Second World War.

=== 20th century ===
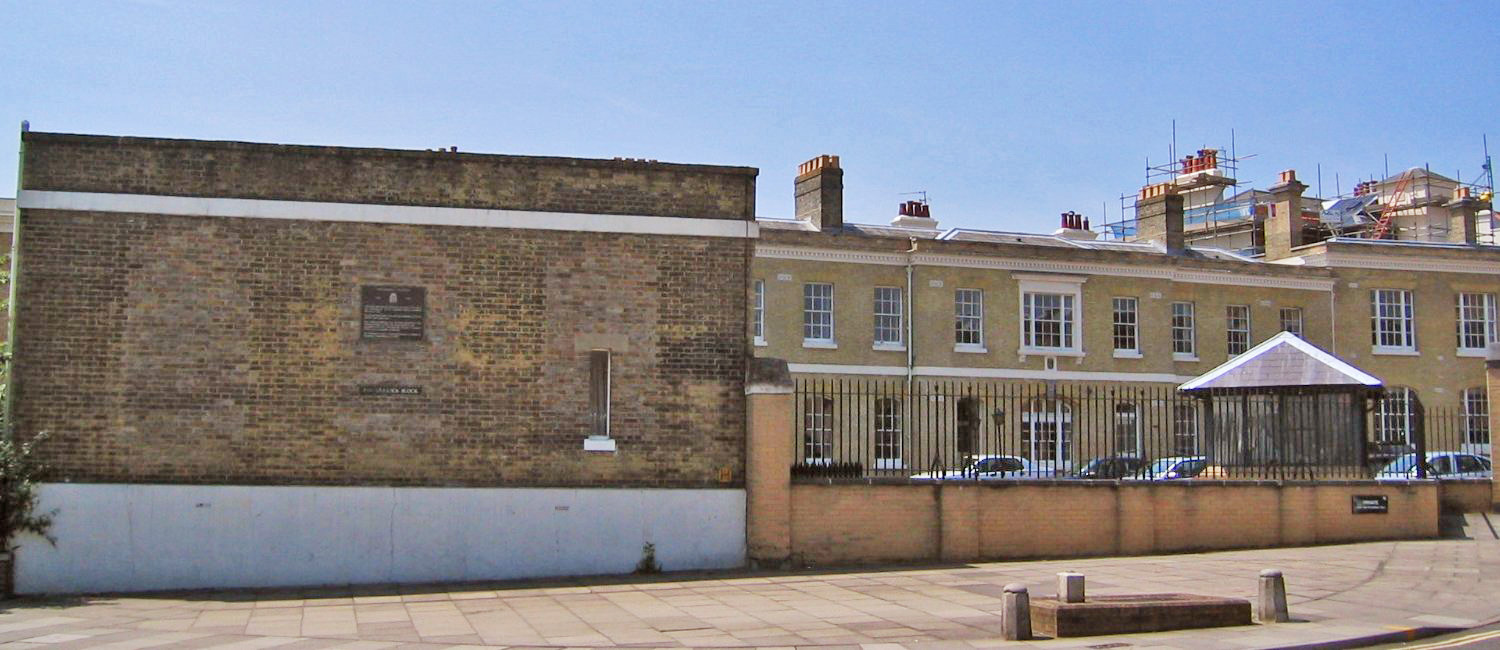
The former headquarters of the Ordnance Survey in London Road, Southampton

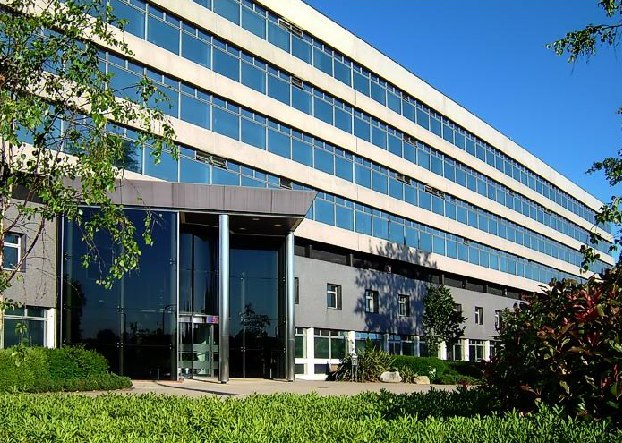
Maybush, Southampton. Ordnance Survey headquarters from 1969 to 2011

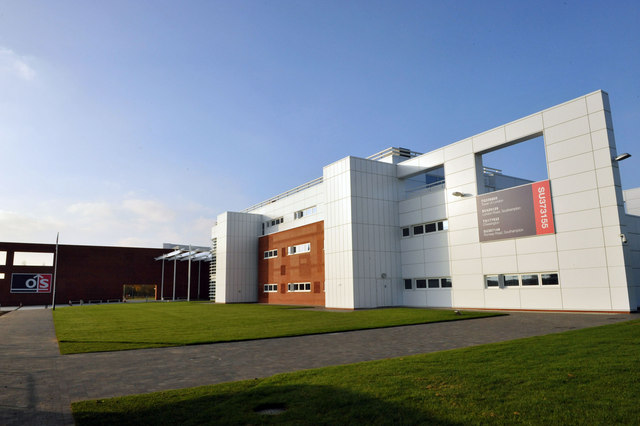
Headquarters in Adanac Park from 2011

During World War I, the Ordnance Survey was involved in preparing maps of France and Belgium. During World War II, many more maps were created, including:

- 1:40,000 map of Antwerp, Belgium
- 1:100,000 map of Brussels, Belgium
- 1:5,000,000 map of South Africa
- 1:250,000 map of Italy
- 1:50,000 map of north-east France
- 1:30,000 map of the Netherlands with manuscript outline of districts occupied by the German Army.

After the war, Colonel Charles Close, then Director General, developed a strategy using covers designed by Ellis Martin to increase sales in the leisure market. In 1920 O. G. S. Crawford was appointed Archaeology Officer and played a prominent role in developing the use of aerial photography to deepen understanding of archaeology.

In 1922, devolution in Northern Ireland led to the creation of the Ordnance Survey of Northern Ireland (OSNI) and the independence of the Irish Free State led to the creation of the Ordnance Survey of Ireland, so the original Ordnance Survey pulled its coverage back to Great Britain. In 1935, the Davidson Committee was established to review the Ordnance Survey's future. The new Director General, Major-General Malcolm MacLeod, started the retriangulation of Great Britain, an immense task involving the erection of concrete triangulation pillars ("trig points") on prominent hilltops as infallible positions for theodolites. Each measurement made by theodolite during the retriangulation was repeated no fewer than 32 times.

The Davidson Committee's final report set the Ordnance Survey on course for the 20th century. The metric national grid reference system was launched and a 1:25000-scale series of maps was introduced. The one-inch maps continued to be produced until the 1970s, when they were superseded by the 1:50000-scale series – as proposed by William Roy more than two centuries earlier.

The Ordnance Survey had outgrown its site in the centre of Southampton (made worse by the bomb damage of the Second World War). The bombing during the Blitz devastated Southampton in November 1940 and destroyed most of the Ordnance Survey's city centre offices. Staff were dispersed to other buildings and to temporary accommodation at Chessington and Esher, Surrey, where they produced 1:25000 scale maps of France, Italy, Germany and most of the rest of Europe in preparation for its invasion. Until 1969, the Ordnance Survey largely remained at its Southampton city centre HQ and at temporary buildings in the suburb of Maybush nearby, when a new purpose-built headquarters was opened in Maybush adjacent to the wartime temporary buildings there. Some of the remaining buildings of the original Southampton city-centre site are now used as part of the city's court complex.

The new head office building was designed by the Ministry of Public Building and Works for 4000 staff, including many new recruits who were taken on in the late 1960s and early 1970s as draughtsmen and surveyors. The buildings originally contained factory-floor space for photographic processes such as heliozincography and map printing, as well as large buildings for storing flat maps. Above the industrial areas were extensive office areas. The complex was notable for its concrete mural. Celestial, by sculptor Keith McCarter and the concrete elliptical paraboloid shell roof over the staff restaurant building.

In 1995, the Ordnance Survey digitised the last of about 230,000 maps, making the United Kingdom the first country in the world to complete a programme of large-scale electronic mapping. By the late 1990s, technological developments had eliminated the need for vast areas for storing maps and for making printing plates by hand. Although there was a small computer section at the Ordnance Survey in the 1960s, the digitising programme had replaced the need for printing large-scale maps, while computer-to-plate technology (in the form of a single machine) had also rendered the photographic platemaking areas obsolete. Part of the latter was converted into a new conference centre in 2000, which was used for internal events and also made available for external organisations to hire.

The Ordnance Survey became an Executive Agency in 1990, making the organisation independent of ministerial control. In 1999, the agency was designated a trading fund, required to cover its costs by charging for its products and to remit a proportion of its profits to the Treasury.

=== 21st century ===
In 2010, OS announced that printing and warehouse operations were to be outsourced, ending over 200 years of in-house printing. The Frome-based firm Butler, Tanner and Dennis (BT&D) secured its printing contract. As already stated, large-scale maps had not been printed at the Ordnance Survey since the common availability of geographical information systems (GISs), but, until late 2010, the OS Explorer and OS Landranger series were printed in Maybush.

In April 2009, building began of a new head office in Adanac Park on the outskirts of Southampton. By 10 February 2011, virtually all staff had relocated to the new "Explorer House" building and the old site had been sold off and redeveloped. Prince Philip officially opened the new headquarters building on 4 October 2011.

On 22 January 2015, plans were announced for the organisation to move from a trading fund model to a government-owned limited company, with the move completed in April 2015. The organisation remains fully owned by the UK government and retains many of the features of a public organisation. In September 2015, the history of the Ordnance Survey was the subject of a BBC Four TV documentary entitled A Very British Map: The Ordnance Survey Story. In December 2015, OS acquired a 25 percent stake in Dennis Maps, successor to the map printing business of BT&D.

On 10 June 2019, the Department for Business, Energy and Industrial Strategy (BEIS) appointed Steve Blair as the Chief Executive of the Ordnance Survey. (Note: see Directors of the Ordnance Survey) The Ordnance Survey supported the launch of the Slow Ways initiative, which encourages users to walk on lesser used paths between UK towns. On 7 February 2023, ownership of Ordnance Survey Ltd passed to the newly formed Department for Science, Innovation and Technology. In August 2025, Ordnance Survey bought the 75 percent interest in Dennis Maps owned by the estate of the late Felix Dennis, bringing its printing operations into the Survey's full ownership.

== Map range ==
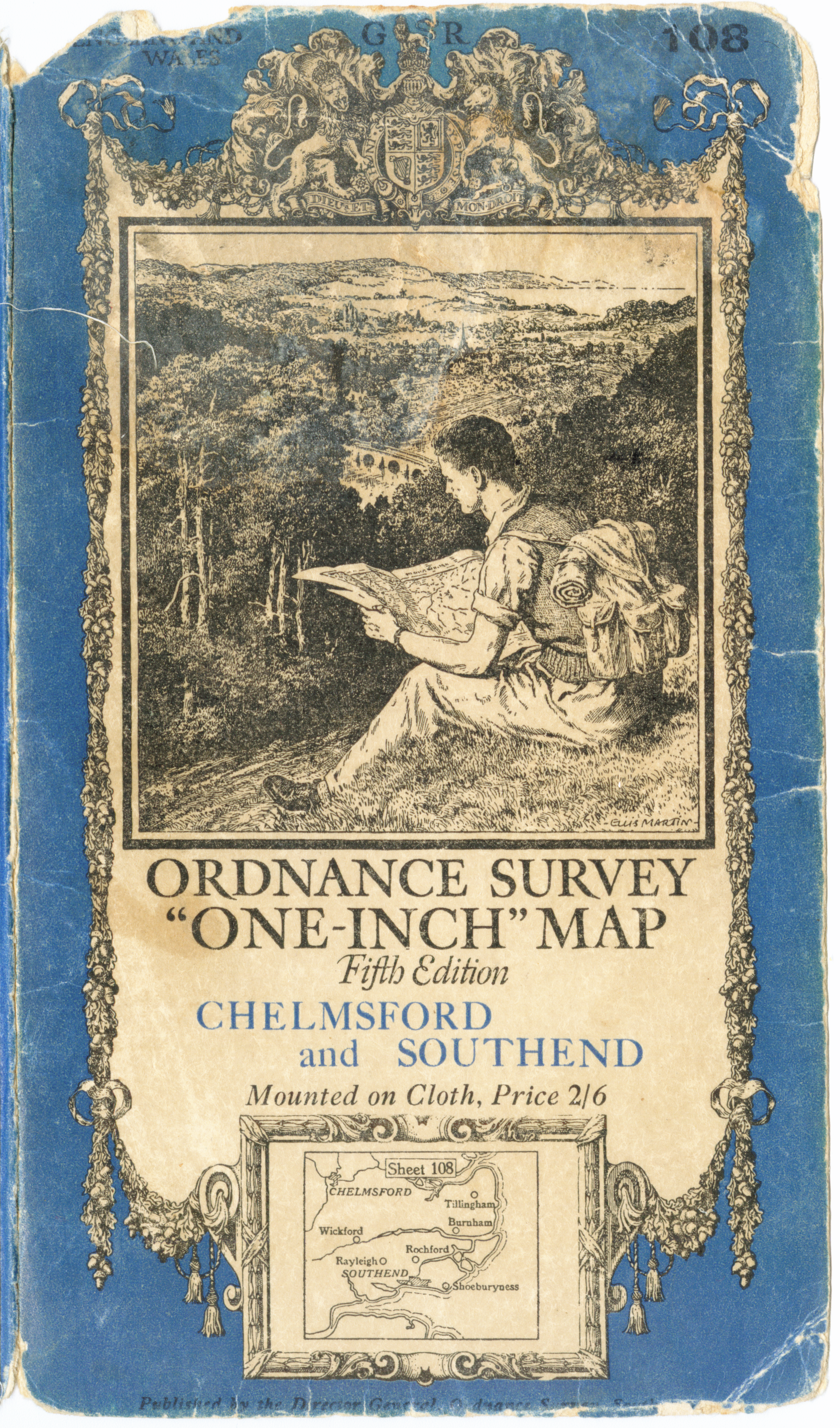
5th series OS map sheet 108, cover. Art by Ellis Martin.

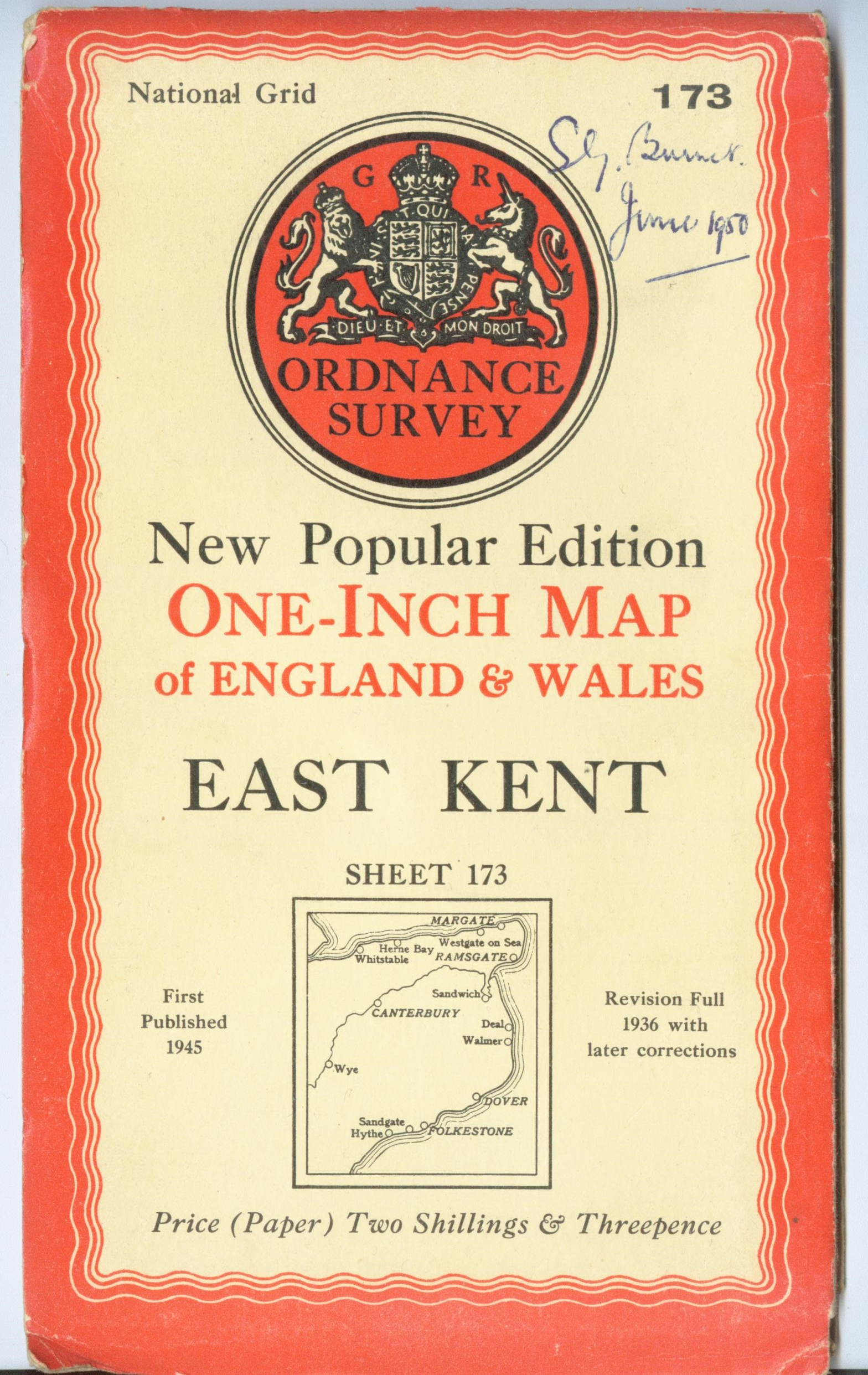
Front cover from 1945

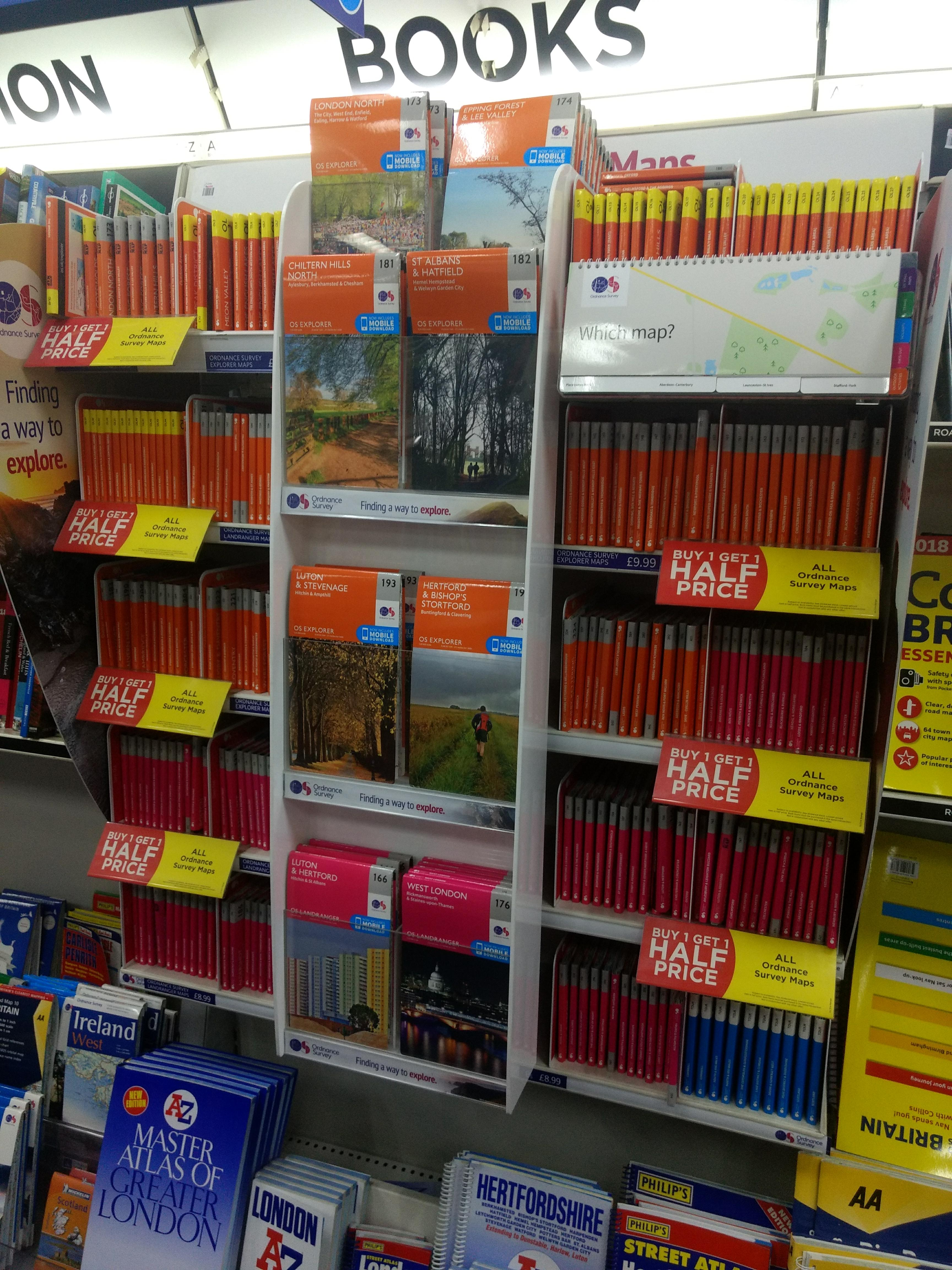
Ordnance Survey maps on sale

The Ordnance Survey produces a large range of paper maps and digital mapping products.

=== OS MasterMap ===
The Ordnance Survey's flagship digital product, launched in November 2001, is OS MasterMap, a database that records, in one continuous digital map, every fixed feature of Great Britain larger than a few metres. Every feature is given a unique TOID (TOpographical IDentifier), a simple identifier that includes no semantic information. Typically, each TOID is associated with a polygon that represents the area on the ground that the feature covers, in National Grid coordinates.

OS MasterMap is offered in themed layers, each linked to a number of TOIDs. In September 2010, the layers were:

Topography
The primary layer of OS MasterMap, consisting of vector data comprising large-scale representation of features in the real world, such as buildings and areas of vegetation. The features captured and the way they are depicted is listed in a specification available on the Ordnance Survey website.
Integrated transport network
A link-and-node network of transport features such as roads and railways. This data is at the heart of many satnav systems. In an attempt to reduce the number of HGVs using unsuitable roads, a data-capture programme of "Road Routing Information" was undertaken by 2015, aiming to add information such as height restrictions and one-way streets.
Imagery
Orthorectified aerial photography in raster format.
Address
An overlay adding every address in the UK to other layers.
Address 2
Adds further information to the Address layer, such as addresses with multiple occupants (blocks of flats, student houses, etc.) and objects with no postal addresses, such as fields and electricity substations.

ITN was withdrawn in April 2019 and replaced by OS MasterMap Highways Network. The Address layers were withdrawn in about 2016 with the information now being available in the AddressBase products – so as of 2020, MasterMap consists of Topography and Imagery. Pricing of licenses to OS MasterMap data depends on the total area requested, the layers licensed, the number of TOIDs in the layers, and the period in years of the data usage. OS MasterMap can be used to generate maps for a vast array of purposes and maps can be printed from OS MasterMap data with detail equivalent to a traditional 1:1250 scale paper map.

The Ordnance Survey states that thanks to continuous review, OS MasterMap data is never more than six months out of date. The scale and detail of this mapping project is unique. By 2009, around 440 million TOIDs had been assigned, and the database stood at 600 gigabytes in size. As of March 2011, OS claims 450 million TOIDs. As of 2005, OS MasterMap was at version 6; 2010's version 8 includes provision for Urban Paths (an extension of the "integrated transport network" layer) and pre-build address layer. All these versions have a similar GML schema.

=== Business mapping ===
The Ordnance Survey produces a wide variety of different products aimed at business users, such as utility companies and local authorities. The data is supplied by the Ordnance Survey on optical media or increasingly, via the Internet. Products can be downloaded via FTP or accessed 'on demand' via a web browser. Organisations using Ordnance Survey data have to purchase a licence to do so. Some of the main products are:

OS MasterMap
The Ordnance Survey's most detailed mapping showing individual buildings and other features in a vector format. Every real-world object is assigned a unique reference number (TOID) that allows customers to add this reference to their own databases. OS MasterMap consists of several so-called "layers" such as the aerial imagery, transport and postcode. The principal layer is the topographic layer.
OS VectorMap Local
A customisable vector product at 1:10,000 scale.
Meridian 2, Strategi
Mid-scale mapping in vector format.
Boundary-Line
Mapping showing administrative boundaries such as counties, parishes and electoral wards.
Raster versions of leisure maps
1:10,000, 1:25,000, 1:50,000, 1:250,000 scale raster

=== Leisure maps ===
Illustration of the Ordnance Survey National Grid coordinate system, with Royal Observatory Greenwich as an example

OS's range of leisure maps are published in a variety of scales:

Tour scales and titles as of July 2021
Number	Scale	Title
1	1:100 000	Cornwall
3	1:110 000	Lake District & Cumbria
4	1:100 000	Peak District & Derbyshire
5	1:130 000	Devon & Somerset West
8	1:100 000	The Cotswolds & Gloucestershire
10	1:175 000	North & Mid Wales
11	1:175 000	South & Mid Wales
12	1:500 000	Scotland

Tour (c. 1:100,000, except Scotland)
One-sheet maps covering a generally county-sized area, showing major and most minor roads and containing tourist information and selected footpaths. Tour maps are generally produced from enlargements of 1:250,000 mapping. Several larger scale town maps are provided on each sheet for major settlement centres. The maps have sky-blue covers and there are eight sheets in the series. Scales vary:
OS Landranger (1:50,000)
The "general purpose" map. They have pink covers; 204 sheets cover the whole of Great Britain and the Isle of Man. The map shows all footpaths and the format is similar to the Explorer maps, but with less detail.
OS Landranger Active (1:50,000)
Select OS Landranger maps available in a plastic-laminated waterproof version, similar to the OS Explorer Active range. As of October 2009, 25 of the 204 Landranger maps were available as OS Landranger Active maps.
OS Explorer (1:25,000)
Specifically designed for walkers and cyclists. They have orange covers, and contain 403 sheets covering the whole of Great Britain (the Isle of Man is excluded from this series). These are the most detailed leisure maps that the Ordnance Survey publish and cover all types of footpaths and most details of the countryside for easy navigation. The OL branded sheets within the Explorer series show areas of greater interest (including the Lake District, the Black Mountains, etc.) with an enlarged area coverage. They appear identical to the ordinary Explorer maps, except for the numbering and a little yellow mark on the corner (a relic of the old Outdoor Leisure series). The OS Explorer maps, together with the former Outdoor Leisure series, superseded the numerous green-covered Pathfinder maps. In May 2015 the Ordnance Survey announced that the new release of OL series maps would come with a mobile download version, available through a dedicated app on Android and iOS devices. It is expected that this will be rolled out to all the Explorer and Landranger series over time.
OS Explorer Active (1:25,000)
OS Explorer and Outdoor Leisure maps in a plastic-laminated waterproof version.
Activity Maps
An experimental range of maps designed to support specific activities. The four map packs currently published are Off-Road Cycling Hampshire North, South, East and West. Each map pack contains 12 cycle routes printed on individual map sheets on waterproof paper. While they are based on the 1:25,000 scale maps, the scales have been adjusted so each route fits on a single A4 sheet.
Route (1:625,000; discontinued 2010)
A double-sided map designed for long-distance road users, covering the whole of Great Britain.
Road (1:250,000; discontinued 2010)
A series of eight sheets covering Great Britain, designed for road users.

The last two, along with fifteen Tour maps, were discontinued during January 2010 as part of a drive for cost efficiency following the Great Recession.

The Road series was reintroduced in September 2016.

=== App development ===
In 2013, the Ordnance Survey released its first official app, OS MapFinder (still available, but no longer maintained), and has since added three more apps. In 2021, OS Maps added coverage in Australia.

OS Maps
Available on iOS and Android, the free to download app allows users to access maps direct to their devices, plan and record routes and share routes with others. Users can subscribe and download OS Landranger and OS Explorer high-resolution maps in 660dpi quality and use them without incurring roaming charges as maps are stored on the device and can be used offline – without Wi-Fi or mobile signal.
OS Maps Web
Available as a web page–it allows users to access maps from the web using modern web browsers, planning of custom routes and printing of maps is possible similarly to what the mobile applications can do
OS Locate
Launched in February 2014 and available on iOS and Android, the free app is a fast and highly accurate means of pinpointing a users exact location and displays grid reference, latitude, longitude and altitude. OS Locate does not need a mobile signal to function, so the inbuilt GPS system in a device can be relied upon.

=== Custom products ===
The Ordnance Survey also offers OS Custom Made, a print-on-demand service based on digital raster data that allows a customer to specify the area of the map or maps desired. Two scales are offered – 1:50,000 (equivalent to 40 km by 40 km) or 1:25,000 (20 km by 20 km) – and the maps may be produced either folded or flat for framing or wall mounting. Customers may provide their own titles and cover images for folded maps.

The Ordnance Survey also produces more detailed custom mapping to order, at 1:1,250 or 1:500 (Siteplan), from its large-scale digital data. Custom scales may also be produced from the enlargement or reduction of the existing scales.

=== Educational mapping ===
The Ordnance Survey supplies reproductions of its maps from the early 1970s to the 1990s for educational use. These are widely seen in schools both in Britain and in former British colonies, either as stand-alone geographic aids or as part of geography textbooks or workbooks.

During the 2000s, in an attempt to increase schoolchildren's awareness of maps, the Ordnance Survey offered a free OS Explorer Map to every 11-year-old in UK primary education. By the end of 2010, when the scheme closed, over 6 million maps had been given away. The scheme was replaced by free access to the Digimap for Schools service provided by EDINA for eligible schools.

With the trend away from paper products towards geographical information systems (GISs), the Ordnance Survey has been looking into ways of ensuring schoolchildren are made aware of the benefits of GISs and has launched "MapZone", an interactive child-orientated website featuring learning resources and map-related games. The Ordnance Survey publishes a quarterly journal, principally for geography teachers, called Mapping News.

=== Derivative and licensed products ===
Bing Maps offers OS data as a layer for the whole of the UK. Philip's publishes OS data in its road and street atlases in book format. One series of historic maps, published by Cassini, is a reprint of the Ordnance Survey first series from the mid-19th century but using the OS Landranger projection at 1:50,000 and given 1 km gridlines. This means that features from over 150 years ago fit almost exactly over their modern equivalents and modern grid references can be given to old features.

The digitisation of the data has allowed the Ordnance Survey to sell maps electronically. Several companies are now licensed to produce the popular scales (1:50,000 and 1:25,000) and their own derived datasets of the map on CD/DVD or to make them available online for download. The buyer typically has the right to view the maps on a PC, a laptop, and a pocket PC/smartphone, and to print off any number of copies. The accompanying software is GPS-aware, and the maps are ready-calibrated. Thus, the user can quickly transfer the desired area from their PC to their laptop or smartphone, and go for a drive or walk with their position continually pinpointed on the screen. The individual map is more expensive than the equivalent paper version, but the price per square km falls rapidly with the size of coverage bought.

=== Free access to historic mapping ===
The National Library of Scotland provides free access to OS mapping from 1840 to 1970, in a variety of scales from 1:1056 "five foot" maps of London to 1:625,000 "ten mile" national planning maps.

In addition, SABRE Maps provides free access to OS mapping from the end of World War 1 to the 1970s at small and intermediate scale mapping, including 1:25000, One Inch, Half Inch, Quarter Inch and Ten Mile scales, usually with a wider coverage of individual revisions than the NLS.

=== History of 1:63360 and 1:50000 map publications ===
Main OS Great Britain 1:63360 (1 inch to 1 mile) and 1:50000 publications
Edition	Publication dates	Scale	Coverage (Note: Coverage: E=England; W=Wales; S=Scotland)	No. of sheets	Notes
Old Series (or First Edition)	1805–1874	1:63360	EW	110	excluded Scotland; first published edition
New Series (or Second Edition)	1872–1897	1:63360	EWS	360EW+131S	first using contour lines
Revised New Series	1895–1904	1:63360	EWS	360EW+131S	some colour sheets available
Third Edition	1903–1919	1:63360	EWS	360EW+131S	"Small sheet series"
Third Edition	1906–1913	1:63360	EWS	152EW+131S	"Large sheet series" in colour; also district and tourist editions
Fourth Edition	1911–1912	1:63360	EWS	–	abandoned small sheet series
Popular Edition	1919–1926	1:63360	EWS	146EW+92S	large sheets; often mistakenly called Fourth Edition
Fifth Edition	1931–1939	1:63360	part E	–	abandoned; many styles available
War Revisions	1943–1945	1:63360	part EW	–	based on fifth and abandoned sixth editions
New Popular (Sixth) Edition	1945–1947	1:63360	EW	64–190	excluded Scotland, national grid
Seventh Series	1952–1973	1:63360	EWS	190	rights of way shown; ten colours
Landranger Series	1974–present	1:50000	EWS	204	ongoing revisions

== Cartography and geodesy ==
The Ordnance Survey maps of Great Britain use the Ordnance Survey National Grid

The Ordnance Survey's original maps were made by triangulation. For the second survey, in 1934, this process was used again and resulted in the building of many triangulation pillars (trig points): short (c. 4 feet/1.2 m high), usually square, concrete or stone pillars at prominent locations such as hill tops. Their precise locations were determined by triangulation, and the details in between were then filled in with less precise methods.

Modern Ordnance Survey maps are largely based on orthorectified aerial photographs, but large numbers of the triangulation pillars remain, many of them adopted by private land owners. The Ordnance Survey still has a team of surveyors across Great Britain who visit in person and survey areas that cannot be surveyed using photogrammetric methods (such as land obscured by vegetation) and there is an aim of ensuring that any major feature (such as a new motorway or large housing development) is surveyed within six months of being built. While original survey methods were largely manual, the current surveying task is simplified by the use of Global Navigation Satellite System technology, allowing the most precise surveying standards yet. The Ordnance Survey is responsible for a UK-wide network of continually operating GNSS stations known as "OS Net". These are used for surveying and other organisations can purchase the right to utilise the network for their own uses.

The Ordnance Survey still maintains a set of master geodetic reference points to tie Ordnance Survey geographic datum points to modern measurement systems such as GPS. Ordnance Survey maps of Great Britain use the Ordnance Survey National Grid rather than latitude and longitude to indicate position. The Grid is known technically as OSGB36 (Ordnance Survey Great Britain 1936) and was introduced after the 1936–1953 retriangulation.

On the British mainland for recording heights the Ordnance Survey maintains an orthometric system referenced to Ordnance Datum Newlyn, which is a height datum defined by mean sea level as measured in Newlyn, Cornwall, between 1915 and 1921. In 2016 the Ordnance Survey redefined Ordnance Datum Newlyn causing a general upwards shift of circa 25mm; an effect of this included the Calf Top hill in Cumbria becoming a mountain.

The Ordnance Survey's CartoDesign team performs a key role in the organisation, as the authority for cartographic design and development, and engages with internal and external audiences to promote and communicate the value of cartography. They work on a broad range of projects and are responsible for styling all new products and services.

== Research ==
For several decades the Ordnance Survey has had a research department that is active in several areas of geographical information science, including:

- Spatial cognition
- Map generalisation
- Spatial data modelling
- Remote sensing and analysis of remotely sensed data
- Semantics and ontologies

The Ordnance Survey actively supports the academic research community through its external research and university liaison team. The research department actively supports MSc and PhD students as well as engaging in collaborative research. Most Ordnance Survey products are available to UK universities that have signed up to the Digimap agreement and data is also made available for research purposes that advances the Ordnance Survey's own research agenda.

== Data access ==
Ordnance Survey possesses a virtual government monopoly on geographic data in the UK, but, although a government agency, it has been required to act as a trading fund (i.e. a commercial entity) from 1999 to 2015. This meant that it is supposed to be entirely self-funded from the commercial sale of its data and derived products whilst at the same time the public supplier of geographical information. In 1985, the Committee of Enquiry into the Handling of Geographic Information was set up to "advise the Secretary of State for the Environment within two years on the future handling of geographic information in the UK, taking account of modern developments in information technology and market needs". The committee's final report, published in 1987 under the name of its chairman Roger Chorley, stressed the importance of accessible geographic information to the UK and recommended a loosening of policies on distribution and cost recovery.

In 2007 the Ordnance Survey were criticised for contracting the public relations company Mandate Communications to understand the dynamics of the free data movement and discover which politicians and advisers continued to support their current policies.

=== OS OpenData ===
In response to the feedback from a consultation Policy options for geographic information from Ordnance Survey the government announced that a package of Ordnance Survey data sets would be released for free use and re-use. On 1 April 2010 the Ordnance Survey released the brand OS OpenData under an attribution-only licence compatible with CC-BY. Various groups and individuals had campaigned for this release of data, but some were disappointed when some of the profitable datasets, including the leisure 1:50,000 scale and 1:25,000 scale mapping, as well as the low scale Mastermap were not included. These were withheld with the counter-argument that if licensees do not pay for OS data collection then the government would have to be willing to foot a £30 million per annum bill to obtain the future economic benefit of sharing the mapping.

In mid-2013 the Ordnance Survey described an "enhanced" linked-data service with a SPARQL 1.1-compliant endpoint and bulk-download options.

In June 2018, following the recommendations of the Geospatial Commission, part of the Cabinet Office, it was announced that parts of OS Mastermap would be released under the Open Government Licence. These would include:

- property extents created from OS MasterMap Topography Layer
- TOIDs from OS MasterMap Topography Layer, by integration into OpenMap Local

Other data would be made available free up to small businesses (under a transaction threshold)

- OS MasterMap Topography Layer, including building heights and functional sites
- OS MasterMap Greenspace Layer
- OS MasterMap Highways Network
- OS MasterMap Water Network Layer
- OS Detailed Path Network

These are available through APIs on the OS Data Hub.

=== Historical material ===
Ordnance Survey historical works are generally available, as the agency is covered by Crown Copyright: works more than fifty years old, including historic surveys of Britain and Ireland and much of the New Popular Edition, are in the public domain. However, finding suitable originals remains an issue as the Ordnance Survey does not provide historical mapping on "free" terms, instead marketing commercially "enhanced" reproductions in partnership with companies including GroundSure and Landmark.

The National Library of Scotland has been developing its archive to make Ordnance Survey maps for all of Great Britain more easily available through their website, whilst the Society for All British and Irish Road Enthusiasts (SABRE) also has a large easily available archive for large numbers of Ordnance Survey maps across all of Great Britain, often with almost complete sets of all relevant map revisions.

Wikimedia Commons has complete sets of scans of the Old/First series one-inch maps of England and Wales; of the Old/First series one-inch maps of Scotland; of the Seventh Series One-inch maps of Great Britain (1952–1967); of the Third Edition quarter-inch maps of England and Wales; and of the Fifth Series quarter-inch maps of Great Britain. These sets are complete in the sense of including at least one copy of each of the sheets in the series, not in the sense of including all revision levels.

== See also ==
- Admiralty chart – Nautical chart
- Benchmark (surveying) – Point with known height used in surveying when levelling
- Cartography – Study and practice of making maps
- Directors of the Ordnance Survey
- Geographers' A–Z Map Company – British independent map publisher
- Geoinformatics – Application of information science methods in geography and geosciences
- Great Trigonometric Survey – 19th-century survey to measure the Indian subcontinent
- Grid reference – Cartesian geographic coordinate system
- Hydrographic survey – Science of measurement and description of features which affect maritime activities
- Hydrography – Measurement of bodies of water
- International Map of the World – Global mapping project in the 20th century
- Martin Hotine – British Army officer and surveyor (was the head of the Trigonometrical and Levelling Division of the Ordnance Survey responsible for the 26-year-long retriangulation of Great Britain (1936–1962) and was the first Director General of the Directorate of Overseas Surveys (1946–1955).)
- National mapping agency – Organisation that produces maps and geographic information of a country
- Ordnance datum – Vertical datum used as the basis for deriving altitudes on maps
- Ordnance Survey International – OS collection for former British colonies
- Ordnance Survey Ireland – Former national mapping agency of Ireland
- Ordnance Survey National Grid – System of geographic grid references used in Great Britain
- Ordnance Survey of Northern Ireland – Northern Irish mapping agency
