= Digimap =

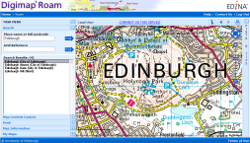
- Screenshot of Digimap Roam showing a map of Edinburgh.
- Website type: Web mapping
- Available in: English
- Owner: EDINA
- Creator: EDINA
- Website: digimap.edina.ac.uk
- Registration: Yes
- Launched: 10 January 2000
- Current status: Active

Digimap is a web mapping and online data delivery service developed by the EDINA national data centre for UK academia. It offers a range of on-line mapping and data download facilities which provide maps and spatial data from Ordnance Survey, British Geological Survey, Landmark Information Group and OceanWise Ltd Ltd., (marine mapping data and charts from the UK Hydrographic Office), Getmapping Ltd, the Environment Agency, OpenStreetMap, CollinsBartholomew Ltd, and various other sources.

Digimap is available to members of subscribing higher and further education institutions in the UK. The service is free at the point of use but requires individual registration. Institutional subscription fees are based on an institutional banding system devised by JISC Collections.

== History ==
Digimap started as a project under the eLib (Electronic Libraries) Programme in 1996 offering Ordnance Survey maps to 6 trial universities: Aberdeen, Edinburgh, Glasgow, Newcastle, Oxford and Reading. The full service was launched in 2000 and won the AGI Award for Technological Progress in 2000.

In mid-2010 Digimap for Schools was launched, providing on-line maps to the schools sector. The service won a Gold Certificate for the best overall resource in the Geographical Association’s 2011 Publishers’ Awards.

== Structure ==
The Digimap service has eleven collections for higher and further education; Ordnance Survey, Historic, Geology, Marine, Environment, Aerial, LiDAR, Global, Society, Verisk, and agCensus. There is also the Digimap for Schools service, which is available to primary and secondary education institutions.

=== Digimap: Ordnance Survey Collection ===
When Digimap was first launched this was the only collection of data available. Originally, the service consisted of a simple mapping client, first known as Lite then re-launched as Classic; an advanced mapping facility, Digimap Carto, which is a Java Applet; and a data download facility. Additional facilities for downloading boundary and postcode data, as well as postcode and gazetteer querying tools, were included later.

In 2007 a separate download facility was developed to allow the download of OS MasterMap data.

In 2009 the simple mapping client (Classic) was replaced with a new interface, Roam, which makes use of OpenLayers "slippy map" technology.

=== Historic Digimap ===
The scanned and georeferenced images of old Ordnance Survey maps were added as a new collection to Digimap in April 2005. The collection was scanned by Landmark Information Group and comprises the Ordnance Survey County Series maps and the National Grid maps covering the period up to the release of the digital Land-Line product in 1996. Along with the scanned maps Landmark also created a mosaic for each map series and each of its revisions, these mosaics have then been cut up into the current Ordnance Survey national grid squares.

The service originally consisted of a single interface for viewing maps and downloading either the national grid squares or the original scanned sheets as GeoTIFF images.

In 2010 a new facility called Ancient Roam was released as a beta service to provide a "slippy maps" style interface for viewing the maps. A separate download interface was also added which allows a greater number of maps to be taken in a single session. At this time the most detailed historic Ordnance Survey maps, the Town Plans, were also offered through the service.

A separate viewer for the Dudley Stamp Land-use Survey maps from the 1930s is also included in the collection.

=== Geology Digimap ===
Geology Digimap was launched in January 2007 to provide access to British Geological Survey (BGS) mapping data.

The service contains the BGS DiGMapGB (Digital Geological Map of Great Britain) Data at three scales: 1:625,000, 1:250,000 and 1:50,000 and uses grey-scale Ordnance Survey mapping as a backdrop for the online mapping facilities. Geology Digimap provides a data download facility in addition to online mapping. This offers the ability to download BGS data for onward use in GIS application software.

In 2010 Geology Digimap a new interface, Geology Roam, was developed to enable slippy map browsing, changes in the opacity of the geology over the backdrop mapping and additional zoom levels.

=== Marine Digimap ===
Marine Digimap was released in January 2008 and contains vector and raster mapping datasets from SeaZone. The service offers Hydrospatial data which is a vector data product created from various hydrographic surveys and data agencies. There is also the Charted Raster dataset, which contains scanned and georeferenced Admiralty Charts from the UK Hydrographic Office.

=== Digimap for Schools ===
Digimap for Schools was launched by Baroness Joan Hanham CBE, Parliamentary Under Secretary of State for Communities and Local Government and Dr Vanessa Lawrence CB, Director General and Chief Executive of Ordnance Survey at Graveney School in Wandsworth, London on Wednesday 10 November 2010. The service was offered free to all schools with 11-year-old pupils until the end of 2011, as part of the Free maps for 11-year-olds scheme. The service is very similar to Digimap Roam for Higher Education, allowing teachers and pupils to view the majority of Ordnance Survey's mapping products on-line, and print them out.

=== Environment Digimap ===
Environment Digimap, offering the LandCover data from the Centre for Ecology and Hydrology (CEH), was added to the suite of Digimap services in October 2013. Initially the service only included data for Great Britain but Northern Irish data was included in March 2014.

=== Aerial Digimap ===
Aerial Digimap was added to the collections in October 2016. This service has added national coverage of 25 cm resolution aerial images from Getmapping. One key difference between this Digimap Data collection and the others is that it is not Jisc funded and subscriptions are directly with EDINA.

=== LiDAR Digimap ===
LiDAR Digimap offers access to Digital Elevation Models created by the Environment Agency, Scottish Environment Protection Agency (SEPA), and Natural Resources Wales. This collection was added in 2017.

=== Global Digimap ===
Global Digimap was added in 2018 to give Digimap data beyond Great Britain. It contains data from OpenStreetMap, Natural Earth, and Collins Bartholomew.

=== Other Collections ===
Digimap also offers Society Digimap with socio-economic data from the Office for National Statistics, Verisk Digimap with data from Verisk Analytics, and agCensus Digimap providing agricultural census data for Great Britain.

== Technology ==

Digimap uses both open source and proprietary software to provide a range of facilities. JavaScript and Java Applet mapping tools are used to present data from PostGIS databases via MapServer and TileCache (Tile Map Service) software. Maps from the TileCache and customised maps specified by the user are created on demand using Cadcorp's GeognoSIS software and presented to the user via an OpenLayers and MapFish interface. In 2010 the EDINA Geoservices Team received a "Highly Commended" in the Innovation & Best Practice (Charitable Status) Award from the AGI, for its implementation of its new technical infrastructure.

In 2007 Snowflake Software's Go Publisher and an Oracle database were added to the software supporting the delivery of Ordnance Survey's OS MasterMap GML data.

The Digimap service is OGC standards compliant and EDINA is an active member of the Open Geospatial Consortium, hosting a meeting in June 2006.
