= Ordnance Survey Great Britain County Series =

Part of a hand-coloured OS 1:2500 first edition (County Series) Staffordshire LXX.12 sheet, surveyed and published 1882

The Ordnance Survey Great Britain County Series maps were produced from the 1840s to the 1890s by the Ordnance Survey, with revisions published until the 1940s. The series mapped the counties of Great Britain at both a six inch and twenty-five inch scale with accompanying acreage and land use information. Following the introduction of the Ordnance Survey National Grid in the 1930s the County Series maps were replaced by a new series of maps at each scale.

== History ==
The Ordnance Survey began producing six inch to the mile (1:10,560) maps of Great Britain in the 1840s, modelled on its first large-scale maps of Ireland from the mid-1830s. This was partly in response to the Tithe Commutation Act 1836 which led to calls for a large-scale survey of England and Wales.

From 1854, to meet requirements for greater detail, including land-parcel numbers in rural areas and accompanying information, cultivated and inhabited areas were mapped at 1:2500 (25.344 inches to the mile), at first parish by parish, with blank space beyond the parish boundary, and later continuously. Early copies of 1:2500 maps were available hand-coloured. Up to 1879 the 1:2500 maps were accompanied by Books of Reference or "area books" that gave acreages and land-use information for land-parcel numbers. After 1879, land-use information was dropped from these area books; after the mid-1880s, the books themselves were dropped and acreages were printed instead on the maps. After 1854, the six-inch maps and their revisions were based on the twenty-five inch maps.

The six-inch sheets covered an area of six by four miles on the ground; the twenty-five inch sheets an area of one by one and a half. One square inch on the twenty-five inch maps was roughly equal to an acre on the ground. In later editions the six-inch sheets were published in "quarters" (NW, NE, SW, SE), each covering an area of three by two miles on the ground.

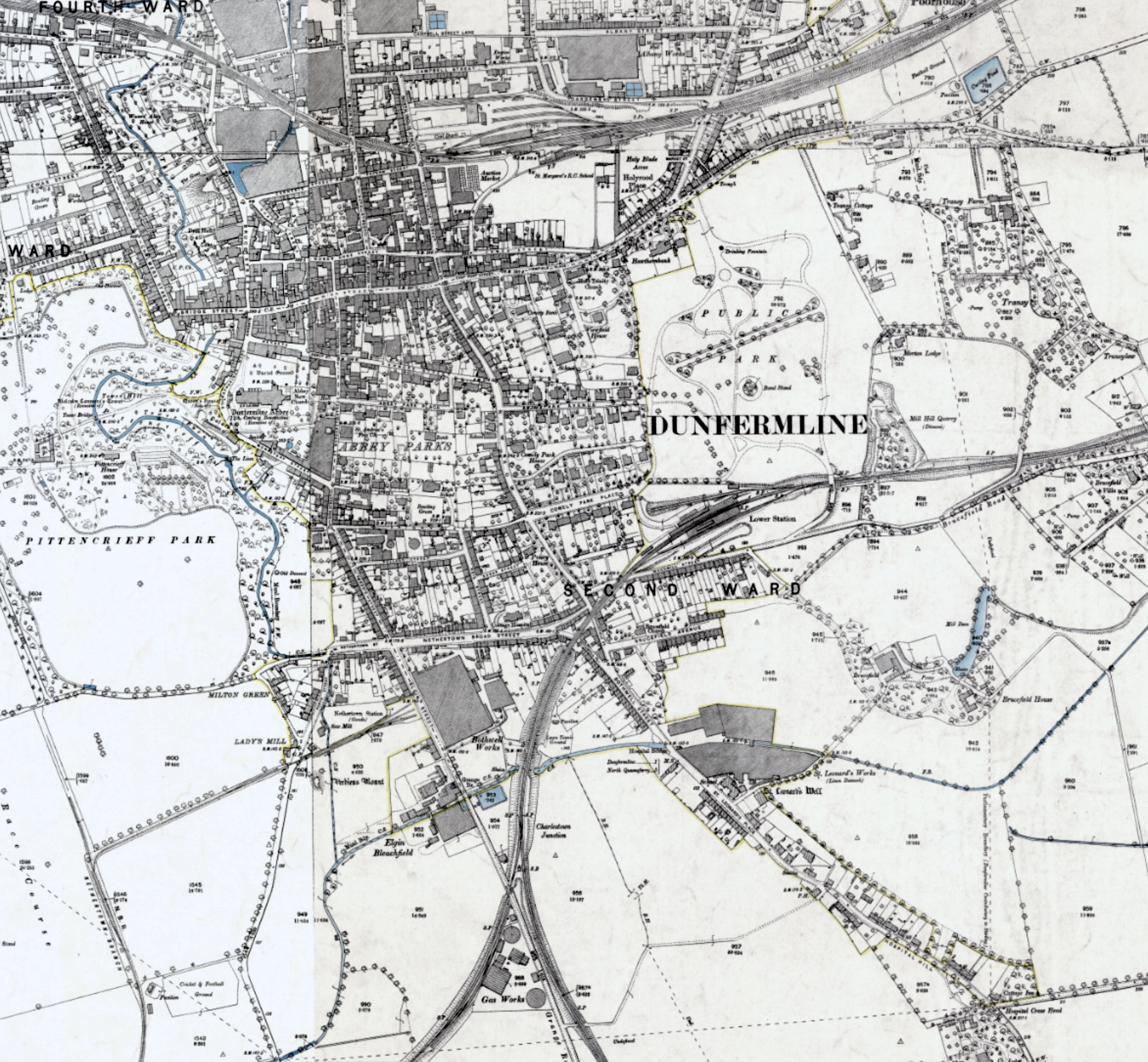
Part of a partially hand-coloured OS 1:2500 (County Series) Fifeshire and Kinross-shire XXXV.14 sheet, 1893; the 25-inch first edition, but re-plotted from the original 1852–1855 six-inch

The first edition of the two scales was completed by the 1890s. A second edition (or "first revision") was begun in 1891 and completed just before the First World War. From 1907 till the early 1940s, a third edition (or "second revision") was begun but never completed: only areas with significant changes on the ground were revised, many two or three times.

From the late 19th century to the early 1940s, the OS produced many "restricted" versions of the County Series maps and other War Department sheets for War Office purposes, in a variety of large scales that included details of military significance such as dockyards, naval installations, fortifications and military camps. Apart from a brief period during the disarmament talks of the 1930s, these areas were left blank or incomplete on standard maps. The de-classified sheets have now been deposited in some of the Copyright Libraries, helping to complete the map-picture of pre-Second World War Britain.

"The first edition Ordnance Survey 25-inch, a miracle of cartography, tries to depict every non-woodland tree... These wonderful maps are the zenith of cartography in the British Isles. They should form the base for any study of modern woodland topography. Recent OS maps cannot compare in detail or accuracy with those of a century ago."

— Oliver Rackham, Trees and Woodland in the British Landscape (1990)

== Coverage ==
Both the 6 inch and 25 inch scale Ordnance Survey maps of Great Britain showed the boundaries of:

- Counties
- Divisions of counties, ridings and quarter sessional divisions
- Parliamentary divisions of counties
- Hundreds/wapentakes/wards (until 1879)
- Mother or ancient parishes (until 1879)
- Civil parishes or townships
- Parliamentary boroughs
- Municipal boroughs
- Municipal wards
- Police burghs (Scotland)
- County boroughs
- Parliamentary divisions of county boroughs
- Wards of corporate towns
- Liberties, honours etc.
- Urban sanitary or local board districts
- Poor law unions
- Divisions of townships (until 1879)
- Subdivisions of townships (until 1879)
- Registrar's and Superintendent registrar's districts (Lancashire & Yorkshire only)

The maps included the area of most civil parishes and their detached parts, as well as extra-parochial areas and townships. Originally the area of these places was given in acres, roods and perches. After about 1879 this was changed to solely acres, with area given to three decimal places. As boundary changes occurred throughout the late 19th century, reprints of map sheets would be updated with annotations detailing these changes.

== 6 inches to the mile (1:10,560) ==
=== England ===
County	No. of Sheets	Surveyed in	Index map
Bedfordshire	35	1878-82	
Berkshire	50	1867-78	
Buckinghamshire	58	1868-81	
Cambridgeshire	63	1877-86	
Cheshire	67	1871-75	
Cornwall & Isles of Scilly	90	1857-84	
Cumberland	90	1863-65	
Derbyshire	63	1874-82	
Devonshire	139	1855-88	
Dorsetshire	60	1862-89	
Durham	58	1856-75	
Essex	89	1862-76	
Gloucestershire	78	1873-83	
Hampshire & Isle of Wight	100	1856-75	
Herefordshire	54	1883-87	
Hertfordshire	47	1865-79	
Huntingdonshire	28	1885-87	
Isle of Man	19	1867-69	
Kent	86	1858-72	
Lancashire	118	1842-49; 1888-93 (Revised & Re-Surveyed)	
Leicestershire	54	1881-86	
Lincolnshire	154	1883-87	
Middlesex	25	1862-71	
Norfolk	111	1879-85	
Northamptonshire	67	1882-86	
Northumberland	111	1857-66	
Nottinghamshire	54	1876-84	
Oxfordshire	58	1872-80	
Rutland	15	1883-84	
Shropshire	84	1873-83	
Somersetshire	95	1882-88	
Staffordshire	75	1875-86	
Suffolk	90	1882-86	
Surrey	47	1861-71	
Sussex	83	1869-75	
Warwickshire	59	1882-86	
Westmorland	51	1858-59	
Wiltshire	78	1873-84	
Worcestershire	64	1881-88	
Yorkshire	301	1844-54; 1888-93 (Revised & Re-Surveyed)	East R. North R. West R. north West R. south

=== Scotland ===
County	No. of Sheets	Surveyed in	Index map
Aberdeenshire	113	1864-71	
Argyllshire & Buteshire	267	1855-77	
Ayrshire	74	1854-59	
Banffshire	49	1865-70	
Berwickshire	31	1855-57	
Caithness-shire	44	1870-72	
Dumbartonshire	29	1858-61	
Dumfries-shire	69	1854-58	
Edinburghshire	25	1850-52	
Elginshire	34	1866-71	
Fifeshire & Kinross-shire	41	1852-55	East; West
Forfarshire	55	1857-62	
Haddingtonshire	22	1852-54	
Inverness-shire (Mainland)	169	1866-76	
Inverness-shire (Hebrides)	70	1876	
Inverness-shire (Isle of Skye)	73	1874-77	
Kincardineshire	28	1863-65	
Kirkcudbrightshire	55	1845-50	East; West
Lanarkshire	55	1856-59	
Linlithgowshire	12	1854-56	
Nairnshire	13	1866-69	
Orkney & Shetland Islands	127	1877-78	North; South
Peebles-shire	27	1855-58	
Perthshire & Clackmannanshire	143	1859-64	
Renfrewshire	20	1856-58	
Ross-shire & Cromartyshire (Mainland)	135	1868-75	
Ross-shire & Cromartyshire (Isle of Lewis)	49	1848-52	
Roxburghshire	48	1856-59	
Selkirkshire	22	1856-59	
Stirlingshire	36	1858-63	
Sutherland	113	1868-73	
Wigtownshire	37	1843-47	East; West

=== Wales ===
County	No. of Sheets	Surveyed in	Index map
Anglesey	25	1886-87	
Brecknockshire	51	1875-88	
Cardiganshire	47	1885-88	
Carmarthenshire	59	1875-88	
Carnarvonshire	48	1887-88	
Denbighshire	46	1871-75	
Flintshire	27	1869-72	
Glamorganshire	52	1871-78	
Merionethshire	49	1873-88	
Monmouthshire	40	1877-82	
Montgomeryshire	52	1881-87	
Pembrokeshire	44	1861-88	
Radnorshire	39	1884-88	

== 25.344 inches to the mile (1:2,500) ==
- 16 25.344" sheets = 1 6" sheet
- 100 5' sheets = 1 6" sheet

== Ordnance Survey Town Plans ==
=== 5 feet to the mile (1:1,056) ===
Town	County	No. of Sheets	Surveyed in
Ayr	Ayrshire	11	1855
Windsor & Eton	Berkshire/Buckinghamshire		1871
Stockport (1st edition)	Cheshire		1851
Stockport (2nd edition)	Cheshire		1873
Stockport (3rd edition)	Cheshire		1895
Dumfries (1st edition)	Dumfriesshire	9	1850
Darlington	Durham		1856
Dalkeith (1st edition)	Edinburghshire	2	1852
Edinburgh (1st edition)	Edinburghshire	54	1849-53
Edinburgh (2nd edition)	Edinburghshire	66	1876-77
Musselburgh (1st edition)	Edinburghshire	12	1853
Cupar (1st edition)	Fifeshire	9	1854
Dunfermline (1st edition)	Fifeshire	9	1854
Kirkcaldy (1st edition)	Fifeshire	7	1855
St Andrews (1st edition)	Fifeshire	4	1854
Haddington (1st edition)	Haddingtonshire	2	1853
Southampton (1st edition)	Hampshire	33	1845-46
Kirkcudbright (1st edition)	Kirkcudbrightshire	1	1850
Accrington (1st edition)	Lancashire		1851
Aston-under-Lyne & Stayleybridge (1st edition)	Lancashire/Cheshire		1851
Aston-under-Lyne & Stayleybridge (2nd edition)	Lancashire/Cheshire		1874
Aston-under-Lyne & Stayleybridge (3rd edition)	Lancashire/Cheshire		1893-94
Bacup (1st edition)	Lancashire		1852
Blackburn (1st edition)	Lancashire		1848
Bolton le Moors (1st edition)	Lancashire		1849
Burnley (1st edition)	Lancashire		1851
Bury (1st edition)	Lancashire		1849
Chorley (1st edition)	Lancashire		1848
Clitheroe (1st edition)	Lancashire		1849
Clitheroe (2nd edition)	Lancashire		1886
Colne (1st edition)	Lancashire		1851
Fleetwood (1st edition)	Lancashire		1851
Haslingden (1st edition)	Lancashire		1849
Heywood (1st edition)	Lancashire		1851
Lancaster (1st edition)	Lancashire		1849
Liverpool (1st edition)	Lancashire		1850
Manchester & Salford (1st edition)	Lancashire		1850-51
Middleton (1st edition)	Lancashire		1851
Oldham (1st edition)	Lancashire		1848-51
Ormskirk (1st edition)	Lancashire		1851
Prescot (1st edition)	Lancashire		1852
Preston (1st edition)	Lancashire		1849
Rochdale (1st edition)	Lancashire		1851
St Helens (1st edition)	Lancashire		1851
Ulverston (1st edition)	Lancashire		1852
Warrington (1st edition)	Lancashire		1851
Wigan (1st edition)	Lancashire		1848-64
Linlithgow	Linlithgowshire	4	1856
Brentford	Middlesex		1867
London (1st edition)	Middlesex/Surrey/Essex/Kent	326	1863-71
London (2nd edition)	Middlesex/Surrey/Essex/Kent	759	1893-96
Selkirk	Selkirkshire	6	1865
Kingston upon Thames	Surrey		1869
Richmond & Kew	Surrey		1871
Stranraer (1st edition)	Wigtownshire	4	1847
Stranraer (2nd edition)	Wigtownshire	4	1863-77
Stranraer (3rd edition)	Wigtownshire	4	1893
Wigtown (1st edition)	Wigtownshire	1	1848
Wigtown (2nd edition)	Wigtownshire	1	1894
Barnsley (1st edition)	Yorkshire		1852
Beverley (1st edition)	Yorkshire		1853-54
Bingley (1st edition)	Yorkshire		1852
Bradford (1st edition)	Yorkshire		1852
Bridlington (1st edition)	Yorkshire		1853
Dewsbury & Batley (1st edition)	Yorkshire		1852
Doncaster (1st edition)	Yorkshire		1852
Halifax (1st edition)	Yorkshire		1852
Howden	Yorkshire		1851
Huddersfield (1st edition)	Yorkshire		1851
Keighley (1st edition)	Yorkshire		1852
Kingston upon Hull (1st edition)	Yorkshire		1856
Knaresborough (1st edition)	Yorkshire		1851
Leeds (1st edition)	Yorkshire		1850
Malton (1st edition)	Yorkshire		1853
Middlesbrough (1st edition)	Yorkshire		1858
Pontefract (1st edition)	Yorkshire		1852
Ripon (1st edition)	Yorkshire		1854
Rotherham (1st edition)	Yorkshire		1853
Scarborough (1st edition)	Yorkshire		1852
Selby (1st edition)	Yorkshire		1849
Sheffield (1st edition)	Yorkshire		1853
Skipton (1st edition)	Yorkshire		1852
Todmorden (1st edition)	Yorkshire		1852
Wakefield (1st edition)	Yorkshire		1851
Whitby (1st edition)	Yorkshire		1852
York (1st edition)	Yorkshire	21	1849-51

=== 10 feet to the mile (1:528) ===
Town	County	No. of Sheets	Surveyed in
Birkenhead	Cheshire		1879-81
Chester	Cheshire		1875
Nantwich	Cheshire		1876
Barnard Castle	Durham		1863
Stockton-on-Tees (1st edition)	Durham		1857
Sunderland	Durham	35	1859
Chelmsford	Essex		1874-76
Merthyr-Tydfil	Glamorganshire	67	1875-76
Hitchin	Hertfordshire		1881
Ware	Hertfordshire		1880
Margate	Kent		1873-74
Sheerness	Kent		1864
Woolwich	Kent		1895
Ashby-de-la-zouch	Leicestershire		1882-3
Hornsey	Middlesex		1894
Uxbridge	Middlesex		1866
Alnwick	Northumberland		1866
Berwick-upon-Tweed	Northumberland	17	1852
Tynemouth, North & South Shields (1st edition)	Northumberland		1857-60

=== 10.56 feet to the mile (1:500) ===
Town	County	No. of Sheets	Surveyed in
Aberdeen	Aberdeenshire	55	1866-67
Peterhead	Aberdeenshire	16	1868
Holyhead	Anglesey	22	1888-89
Campbeltown	Argyllshire	12	1865
Oban	Argyllshire	17	1867-68
Girvan	Ayrshire	9	1857
Irvine	Ayrshire	5	1859
Kilmarnock	Ayrshire	15	1857-59
Maybole	Ayrshire	5	1856-57
Rothesay	Ayrshire	8	1862-63
Bedford	Bedfordshire		
Biggleswade	Bedfordshire	10	
Dunstable	Bedfordshire		
Leighton Buzzard	Bedfordshire		
Luton	Bedfordshire		
Abingdon	Berkshire		
Maidenhead	Berkshire	5	1875
Newbury	Berkshire		
Reading	Berkshire		
Wokingham	Berkshire		
Brecon	Brecknockshire	10	1888
Aylesbury	Buckinghamshire		
Buckingham	Buckinghamshire		
Great Marlow	Buckinghamshire		
High Wycombe	Buckinghamshire		
Alloa	Caithness-shire	10	1861-62
Wick	Caithness-shire	16	1872
Bangor	Carnarvonshire	18	1889
Caernarfon	Carnarvonshire	10	1888-89
Llandudno	Carnarvonshire	19	1889
Cambridge	Cambridgeshire		
Ely	Cambridgeshire		
March	Cambridgeshire		
Wisbech	Cambridgeshire		
Aberystwyth (1st edition)	Cardiganshire	14	1887
Aberystwyth (2nd edition)	Cardiganshire	11	1905
Carmarthen	Carmarthenshire	17	1888
Llanelly	Carmarthenshire	23	1880
Altrincham	Cheshire		
Congleton	Cheshire		
Crewe	Cheshire		
Hyde	Cheshire		
Macclesfield	Cheshire		
Northwich	Cheshire		
Runcorn	Cheshire		
Bodmin	Cornwall		
Camborne	Cornwall		
Falmouth	Cornwall		
Liskeard	Cornwall		
Penzance	Cornwall		
Redruth	Cornwall		
St Austell	Cornwall		
St Ives	Cornwall		
Truro	Cornwall		
Carlisle	Cumberland		
Cockermouth	Cumberland		
Maryport	Cumberland		
Penrith	Cumberland		
Whitehaven	Cumberland		
Wigton	Cumberland		
Workington	Cumberland		
Denbigh	Denbighshire	6	1874-76
Wrexham	Denbighshire	16	1872-81
Belper	Derbyshire		
Buxton	Derbyshire		
Chesterfield	Derbyshire		
Derby	Derbyshire		
Glossop	Derbyshire		
Ilkeston	Derbyshire		
Long Eaton	Derbyshire		
Barnstaple	Devonshire	25	
Bideford	Devonshire	10	
Brixham	Devonshire	5	
Crediton	Devonshire	13	
Dartmouth	Devonshire	13	
Dawlish	Devonshire	9	
Exeter	Devonshire	41	
Exmouth	Devonshire	17	
Ilfracombe	Devonshire	16	
Newton Abbot	Devonshire	15	
Plymouth	Devonshire	84	
Tavistock	Devonshire	14	
Teignmouth	Devonshire		
Tiverton	Devonshire	11	
Torquay	Devonshire	18	
Totnes	Devonshire	9	
Bridport	Dorsetshire		
Dorchester	Dorsetshire		
Poole	Dorsetshire		
Sherborne	Dorsetshire		
Weymouth	Dorsetshire		
Alexandria & Bonhill	Dumbartonshire	11	1859
Dumbarton	Dumbartonshire	7	1859
Kirkintilloch	Dumbartonshire	6	1859
Annan	Dumfriesshire	16	1859
Dumfries (2nd edition)	Dumfriesshire	20	1893
Bishops Auckland	Durham		
Durham	Durham	9	
Gateshead	Durham		
Hartlepool	Durham		
Stockton-on-Tees (2nd edition)	Durham		
Dalkeith (2nd edition)	Edinburghshire	7	1893
Edinburgh (3rd edition)	Edinburghshire	184	1893-94
Musselburgh (2nd edition)	Edinburghshire	11	1893
Portobello	Edinburghshire	8	1893-94
Elgin	Elginshire	13	1868
Forres	Elginshire	8	1868
Braintree	Essex		
Brentwood	Essex		
Colchester	Essex		
Halstead	Essex		
Harwich	Essex		
Maldon	Essex		
Romford	Essex		
Saffron Walden	Essex		
Waltham Abbey	Essex		
Burntisland	Fifeshire	7	1894
Cupar (2nd edition)	Fifeshire	11	1893-94
Dunfermline (2nd edition)	Fifeshire	11	1894
Kirkcaldy (2nd edition)	Fifeshire	26	1894
St Andrews (2nd edition)	Fifeshire	14	1893
Holywell	Flintshire	5	1871
Mold	Flintshire	6	1871-79
Rhyl	Flintshire	18	1872
Arbroath	Forfarshire	16	1858
Brechin	Forfarshire	9	1852
Dundee (1st edition)	Forfarshire	58	1857-58
Dundee (2nd edition)	Forfarshire	111	1871-72
Forfar	Forfarshire	8	1860-61
Kirriemuir	Forfarshire	2	1861
Montrose	Forfarshire	11	1861-62
Aberdare	Glamorganshire	19	1868
Cardiff (1st edition)	Glamorganshire	117	1880
Cardiff (2nd edition)	Glamorganshire	143	1900
Neath	Glamorganshire	13	1878
Swansea	Glamorganshire	35	1879-80
Bristol	Gloucestershire	182	
Cheltenham	Gloucestershire	128	
Cirencester	Gloucestershire	12	
Gloucester	Gloucestershire	61	
Stroud	Gloucestershire	14	
Tewkesbury	Gloucestershire	9	
Haddington (2nd edition)	Haddingtonshire	12	1893
Aldershot	Hampshire		
Andover	Hampshire		
Basingstoke	Hampshire		
Bournemouth	Hampshire		
Christchurch	Hampshire		
Gosport	Hampshire		
Lymington	Hampshire		
Newport	Hampshire		
Petersfield	Hampshire		
Portsmouth	Hampshire		
Romsey	Hampshire		
Ryde	Hampshire		
Southampton (2nd edition)	Hampshire	40	1868
West Cowes	Hampshire		
Winchester	Hampshire		
Hereford	Herefordshire		
Leominster	Herefordshire		
Berkhamstead	Hertfordshire		
Bishop's Stortford	Hertfordshire		
Hemel Hempstead	Hertfordshire		
Hertford	Hertfordshire		
St Albans	Hertfordshire		
Tring	Hertfordshire		
Watford	Hertfordshire		
Huntingdon & Godmanchester	Huntingdonshire		
Inverness	Inverness-shire	41	1867-68
Douglas	Isle of Man		
Ramsey	Isle of Man		
Ashford	Kent		
Canterbury	Kent		
Dartford	Kent		
Deal	Kent		
Dover	Kent		
Faversham	Kent		
Folkestone	Kent		
Gravesend	Kent		
Maidstone	Kent		
Ramsgate	Kent		
Rochester, Chatham & Stood	Kent		
Sandwich	Kent		
Sevenoaks	Kent		
Tonbridge	Kent		
Tunbridge Wells	Kent		
Stonehaven	Kincardineshire	7	1864
Kirkcudbright (2nd edition)	Kirkcudbrightshire	4	1893
Airdrie	Lanarkshire	8	1858
Coatbridge	Lanarkshire	10	1858
Glasgow & Rutherglen (1st edition)	Lanarkshire	206	1857-58
Glasgow & Rutherglen (2nd edition)	Lanarkshire	369	1892-94
Hamilton	Lanarkshire	15	1858
Lanark	Lanarkshire	4	1858
Strathaven	Lanarkshire	2	1858
Accrington (2nd edition)	Lancashire		
Atherton (Chowbent)	Lancashire		
Bacup (2nd edition)	Lancashire		
Barrow-in-Furness	Lancashire		
Blackburn (2nd edition)	Lancashire		
Blackpool	Lancashire		
Bolton-le-Moors (2nd edition)	Lancashire		
Burnley (2nd edition)	Lancashire		
Bury & Radcliffe (2nd edition)	Lancashire		
Chorley (2nd edition)	Lancashire		
Clayton-le-Moors & Great Harwood	Lancashire		
Colne (2nd edition)	Lancashire		
Dalton-in-Furness	Lancashire		
Darwen	Lancashire		
Eccles	Lancashire		
Farnworth	Lancashire		
Fleetwood (2nd edition)	Lancashire		
Garston	Lancashire		
Haslingden (2nd edition)	Lancashire		
Heywood (2nd edition)	Lancashire		
Hindley	Lancashire		
Horwich	Lancashire		
Lancaster (2nd edition)	Lancashire		
Leigh	Lancashire		
Littleborough	Lancashire		
Liverpool (2nd edition)	Lancashire		
Lytham	Lancashire		
Manchester & Salford (2nd edition)	Lancashire		
Middleton (2nd edition)	Lancashire		
Morecambe	Lancashire		
Mossley	Lancashire		
Nelson	Lancashire		
Oldham (2nd edition)	Lancashire		1879
Ormskirk (2nd edition)	Lancashire		
Padiham	Lancashire		
Prescot (2nd edition)	Lancashire		
Preston (2nd edition)	Lancashire		
Ramsbottom	Lancashire		
Rawtenstall	Lancashire		
Rishton	Lancashire		
Rochdale (2nd edition)	Lancashire		
Royton	Lancashire		
Southport	Lancashire		
St Helens (2nd edition)	Lancashire		
Swinton	Lancashire		
Tyldesley	Lancashire		
Ulverston (2nd edition)	Lancashire		
Warrington (2nd edition)	Lancashire		
Widnes	Lancashire		
Wigan (2nd edition)	Lancashire		
Withington	Lancashire		
Hinckley	Leicestershire		
Leicester	Leicestershire		
Loughborough	Leicestershire		
Melton Mowbray	Leicestershire		
Boston	Lincolnshire		
Gainsborough	Lincolnshire		
Grantham	Lincolnshire	10	
Grimsby	Lincolnshire		
Horncastle	Lincolnshire		
Lincoln	Lincolnshire	31	
Louth	Lincolnshire		
Sleaford	Lincolnshire	10	
Spalding	Lincolnshire		
Stamford	Lincolnshire	19	
Abergavenny	Monmouthshire	13	1881
Monmouth	Monmouthshire	10	1881
Newport	Monmouthshire	70	1883-84
Pontypool	Monmouthshire	10	1880-81
Newtown	Montgomeryshire	12	1885
Welshpool	Montgomeryshire	10	1885
Nairn	Nairnshire	12	1867-68
Kettering	Northamptonshire		
Northampton	Northamptonshire		
Peterborough	Northamptonshire	53	
Wellingborough	Northamptonshire		
Blyth	Northumberland		
Hexham	Northumberland		
Morpeth	Northumberland		
Newcastle upon Tyne & Gateshead	Northumberland		
Tynemouth, North & South Shields (2nd edition)	Northumberland		
Wallsend & Jarrow	Northumberland		
East Dereham	Norfolk		
Great Yarmouth	Norfolk		
King's Lynn	Norfolk		
Norwich	Norfolk		
Thetford	Norfolk		
East Retford	Nottinghamshire	17	
Hucknall Torkard	Nottinghamshire		
Mansfield	Nottinghamshire		
Newark-on-Trent	Nottinghamshire	12	
Nottingham	Nottinghamshire		
Sutton in Ashfield	Nottinghamshire		
Worksop	Nottinghamshire		
Banbury	Oxfordshire		
Henley-on-Thames	Oxfordshire		
Oxford	Oxfordshire		
Peebles	Peebles-shire	9	1856
Haverfordwest	Pembrokeshire	16	1889
Pembroke	Pembrokeshire	8	1861
Pembroke Dock	Pembrokeshire	9	1864
Tenby	Pembrokeshire	18	1888-89
Perth	Perthshire	25	1860
Greenock	Renfrewshire	20	1857
Paisley	Renfrewshire	32	1858
Port Glasgow	Renfrewshire	7	1856-57
Hawick	Roxburghshire	13	1857-58
Jedburgh	Roxburghshire	9	1858
Kelso	Roxburghshire	9	1857
Galashiels	Selkirkshire	8	1858
Falkirk	Stirlingshire	14	1859
Bridgnorth	Shropshire		
Ludlow	Shropshire		
Oswestry	Shropshire		
Shrewsbury	Shropshire		
Wellington	Shropshire		
Whitchurch	Shropshire		
Bath	Somersetshire	86	
Bridgwater	Somersetshire	33	
Clevedon	Somersetshire	28	
Crewkerne	Somersetshire	20	
Frome	Somersetshire	27	
Shepton Mallet	Somersetshire	19	
Taunton	Somersetshire	49	
Wellington	Somersetshire	24	
Wells	Somersetshire	12	
Weston-super-Mare	Somersetshire	35	
Yeovil	Somersetshire	26	
Brierley Hill	Staffordshire		
Burslem	Staffordshire		
Burton upon Trent	Staffordshire		
Chesterton	Staffordshire		
Darlaston	Staffordshire		
Fenton	Staffordshire		
Hanley	Staffordshire		
Kidsgrove	Staffordshire		
Leek	Staffordshire		
Lichfield	Staffordshire		
Longton	Staffordshire		
Newcastle-under-Lyme	Staffordshire		
Stafford	Staffordshire		
Stoke-on-Trent	Staffordshire		
Stone	Staffordshire		
Tamworth	Staffordshire		
Tunstall	Staffordshire		
Walsall	Staffordshire		
Wednesbury	Staffordshire		
West Bromwich & Smethwick	Staffordshire		
Wolverhampton	Staffordshire		
Stirling	Stirlingshire	15	1858
Beccles	Suffolk		
Bury St Edmunds	Suffolk		
Ipswich	Suffolk		
Lowestoft	Suffolk		
Newmarket	Suffolk		
Stowmarket	Suffolk		
Sudbury	Suffolk		
Woodbridge	Suffolk		
Chertsey	Surrey		
Croydon	Surrey		
Dorking	Surrey		
Farnham	Surrey		
Guildford	Surrey		
Redhill	Surrey		
Reigate	Surrey		
Brighton	Sussex		
Chichester	Sussex		
Eastbourne	Sussex		
Hastings	Sussex		
Horsham	Sussex		
Lewes	Sussex		
Petworth	Sussex		
Rye	Sussex		
Worthing	Sussex		
Atherstone	Warwickshire		
Birmingham & Smethwick	Warwickshire		
Coventry	Warwickshire		
Leamington	Warwickshire		
Nuneaton	Warwickshire		
Rugby	Warwickshire		
Stratford-upon-Avon	Warwickshire		
Warwick	Warwickshire		
Appleby	Westmorland		
Kendal	Westmorland		
Bradford-on-Avon	Wiltshire	13	
Chippenham	Wiltshire	24	
Devizes	Wiltshire	12	
Salisbury	Wiltshire	17	
Swindon	Wiltshire	28	
Trowbridge	Wiltshire	18	
Warminster	Wiltshire	14	
Bromsgrove	Worcestershire		
Droitwich	Worcestershire		
Dudley	Worcestershire		
Evesham	Worcestershire		
Kidderminster	Worcestershire		
Malvern	Worcestershire		
Oldbury	Worcestershire		
Redditch	Worcestershire		
Stourbridge	Worcestershire		
Worcester	Worcestershire		
Barnsley (2nd edition)	Yorkshire		
Beverley (2nd edition)	Yorkshire		1892
Bingley (2nd edition)	Yorkshire		1891
Birstall	Yorkshire		
Bradford (2nd edition)	Yorkshire		1891
Bridlington (2nd edition)	Yorkshire		
Brighouse	Yorkshire		
Castleford	Yorkshire		
Cleckheaton	Yorkshire		1891
Dewsbury & Batley (2nd edition)	Yorkshire		1890
Doncaster (2nd edition)	Yorkshire		
Elland	Yorkshire		
Farsley, Pudsey & Stanningley	Yorkshire		1891
Goole	Yorkshire		1891
Great Driffield	Yorkshire		
Halifax (2nd edition)	Yorkshire		1890
Harrogate	Yorkshire		1890
Hebden Bridge	Yorkshire		
Heckmondwike	Yorkshire		1890
Huddersfield (2nd edition)	Yorkshire		
Idle	Yorkshire		1891
Ilkley	Yorkshire		1891
Keighley (2nd edition)	Yorkshire		1891
Kingston upon Hull (2nd edition)	Yorkshire		1891
Knaresborough (2nd edition)	Yorkshire		
Knottingley	Yorkshire		
Leeds (2nd edition)	Yorkshire		1891
Malton (2nd edition)	Yorkshire		
Middlesbrough (2nd edition)	Yorkshire		1894
Mirfield	Yorkshire		
Morley	Yorkshire		
Otley	Yorkshire		1890
Pontefract (2nd edition)	Yorkshire		1891
Ravensthorpe	Yorkshire		
Richmond	Yorkshire		
Ripon (2nd edition)	Yorkshire		1891
Rotherham (2nd edition)	Yorkshire		1889
Saltaire & Shipley	Yorkshire		1891
Scarborough (2nd edition)	Yorkshire		1892
Selby (2nd edition)	Yorkshire		1891
Sheffield (2nd edition)	Yorkshire		
Skipton (2nd edition)	Yorkshire		1891
Sowerby Bridge	Yorkshire		
Todmorden (2nd edition)	Yorkshire		
Wakefield (2nd edition)	Yorkshire		
Whitby (2nd edition)	Yorkshire		
York (2nd edition)	Yorkshire	35	1889-91

London Index map 1 London Index map 2 London Index map
