= GB1900 =

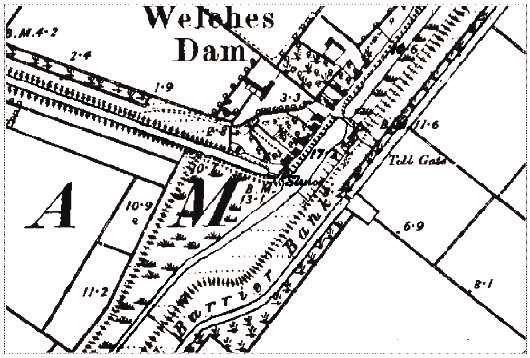
Welches Dam, on the Old Bedford River, as seen on an 1892 map in the series used to compile the gazetteer. The coordinates of the first letter resolve in the GB1900 data to 52.452096°N 0.158079°E

The GB1900 project was a crowd-sourced initiative to create a gazetteer, released under an open licence, by transcribing and geolocating all the place names on the second edition County Series of six inch to one mile (i.e. 1:10,560) maps of Great Britain, published by Ordnance Survey between 1888 and 1914, and thus out of copyright. Almost 1,200 volunteers contributed. Subsequent research found that they were "motivated by personal interest in the maps, in places that held meaning for them, and in how places had changed."

The project began as Cymru1900 in October 2013 under the auspices of the National Library of Wales, the University of Wales Centre for Advanced Welsh and Celtic Studies, People's Collection Wales and the Royal Commission on the Ancient and Historical Monuments of Wales, before being relaunched nationally as GB1900 in September 2016 using maps scanned by the National Library of Scotland. The software was updated and hosted by the University of Portsmouth. Transcription was concluded in January 2018, with the launch of the gazetteer in July that year.

Each placename was tagged with the WGS84 coordinates and Ordnance Survey National Grid reference of the position of the bottom-left of the first letter of its first word, and allocated a 24-character hexadecimal code, which could not begin with zero, as well as a shorter seven-digit sequential ID.

The resulting data (excepting personal data about contributors) is available under a CC0 licence from the Vision of Britain website. The complete gazetteer (reconciled to resolve differences between transcribers and including modern place name equivalents and the corresponding modern parish and local authority names, as of 1991 in England and Wales and 2001 in Scotland) and an abridged version of it (removing duplicated data for common features such as "F.P." for "footpath" and "W" for "well") are available under a CC by-sa licence from the same source. The former has 2,552,460 entries and the latter 1,174,450.

109,193 entries end with a space followed by "Road", "Street", "Lane", "Rd." or "St." The abridged gazetteer includes 1,617 entries for "Manor House", 1,496 for "Manor Farm", and 454 for "High Street".

Data from the gazetteer is used by the Royal Commission on the Ancient and Historical Monuments of Wales and the National Library of Scotland, and is being incorporated into Wikidata.
