= EDINA =

Coordinates: 55°56′49″N 3°12′04″W

- EDINA National Data Centre
- Formation: 1996
- Purpose: Providing online data services for researchers and students
- Location: Argyle House, 3 Lady Lawson Street, Edinburgh, UK
- Region served: UK
- Services: Digimap, Noteable
- Website: EDINA

EDINA is a centre for digital expertise, based at the University of Edinburgh as a division of the Information Services Group.

== Services ==
EDINA front-end services (those accessed directly by the user) are available free at the point of use for University of Edinburgh students and academic staff in the UK working on and off campus. Access to services by external universities, colleges or schools involves licence or subscription and requires some form of authentication by end users. Some services are also provided to researchers outside the UK academic sector.

A key service, offered since January 2000, is Digimap, with its core Ordnance Survey collection. Since 2017, EDINA has also offered Noteable, an online hosting platform for computational notebooks, which is built from the open-source Jupyter Notebook environment.

== History ==
=== Edinburgh University Data Library ===
EDINA has its origin in Edinburgh University Data Library, which was set up in 1983/4.

Researchers at the University of Edinburgh working with data from government surveys were looking to the university to provide university-wide provision for files that were too large to be stored on individual computing accounts. Arrangements for the University Library to purchase the small area statistics from the 1981 Population Census became the opportunity to petition action by the Program Library Unit (PLU) - which had both local responsibility for software provision and a national role to convert software for various computing platforms for UK universities. The PLU was also active in the design and implementation of the code for SASPAC, the program used widely for the extraction of census data, as part of a project led by David Rhind of Durham University.

In response, the Data Library was formed as a small group within the PLU led by Trevor Jones plus 1.5 staff: use of a programmer and a computing assistant. Peter Burnhill took over full-time responsibility in 1984. Early holdings were the 1981 UK population census, and research data from the universities of Edinburgh, Glasgow and Strathclyde.

Geographic information was a focus from the beginning, as the Data Library worked with researcher Jack Hotson to convert parish-based agricultural census data to grid square estimates. This allowed detailed visualisation of land use across the UK.

A collaboration with the Department of Geography saw the establishment of the Regional Research Laboratory for Scotland, focusing on quantitative techniques in the Social Sciences. Soon afterwards followed SALSER, a serials index bringing together libraries from the thirteen Scottish universities, the National Library of Scotland and the two major civic libraries of Edinburgh and Glasgow.

Links to the research community were cemented by the RAPID project, which linked research activity to the output of other work funded by the Economic and Social Research Council. Uniquely, RAPID included not only conventional monograph and journal publications, but also new types of research output such as software, datasets and learning materials. Reusable components for self-paced learning were to become an integral part of the department's role a few years later.

=== Launch of EDINA ===
Such projects built up a wealth of knowledge within the Data Library, and a breadth of subject which was to serve it well for the most important event in its history - the launch of the EDINA national data centre in 1995/96. Along with BIDS (acquired by ingenta in 1998) at the University of Bath and MIDAS (now Mimas) at the University of Manchester, the Edinburgh University Data Library was chosen as a JISC-funded centre for the provision of data services to the entire UK academic community. With the launch of EDINA, the Data Library had to be redefined to continue its local remit, distinct from the national services. Donald Morse took on the role of manager of the new Local Services team, and Joan Fairgrieve became the university's first Data Librarian.

EDINA's new services included bibliographic indexes such as BIOSIS and Ei Compendex, which helped with literature searches, and UKBORDERS, which filled a gap in census, political and postal boundary data. The Digimap service, launched in 2000, continues to provide access to a number of national geospatial data sets including Ordnance Survey GB maps and data, historical Ordnance Survey GB maps and maps and data of UK geology and hydrographic and other marine environments. SUNCAT, the Serials Union Catalogue for the UK research community, became a freely available EDINA service in 2006, and contained data from scores of UK research libraries, including the British Library and the National Libraries of Scotland and Wales. The catalogue was retired in 2019.
