= General Post Office =

Postal system in the United Kingdom

- Royal Arms of HM Government

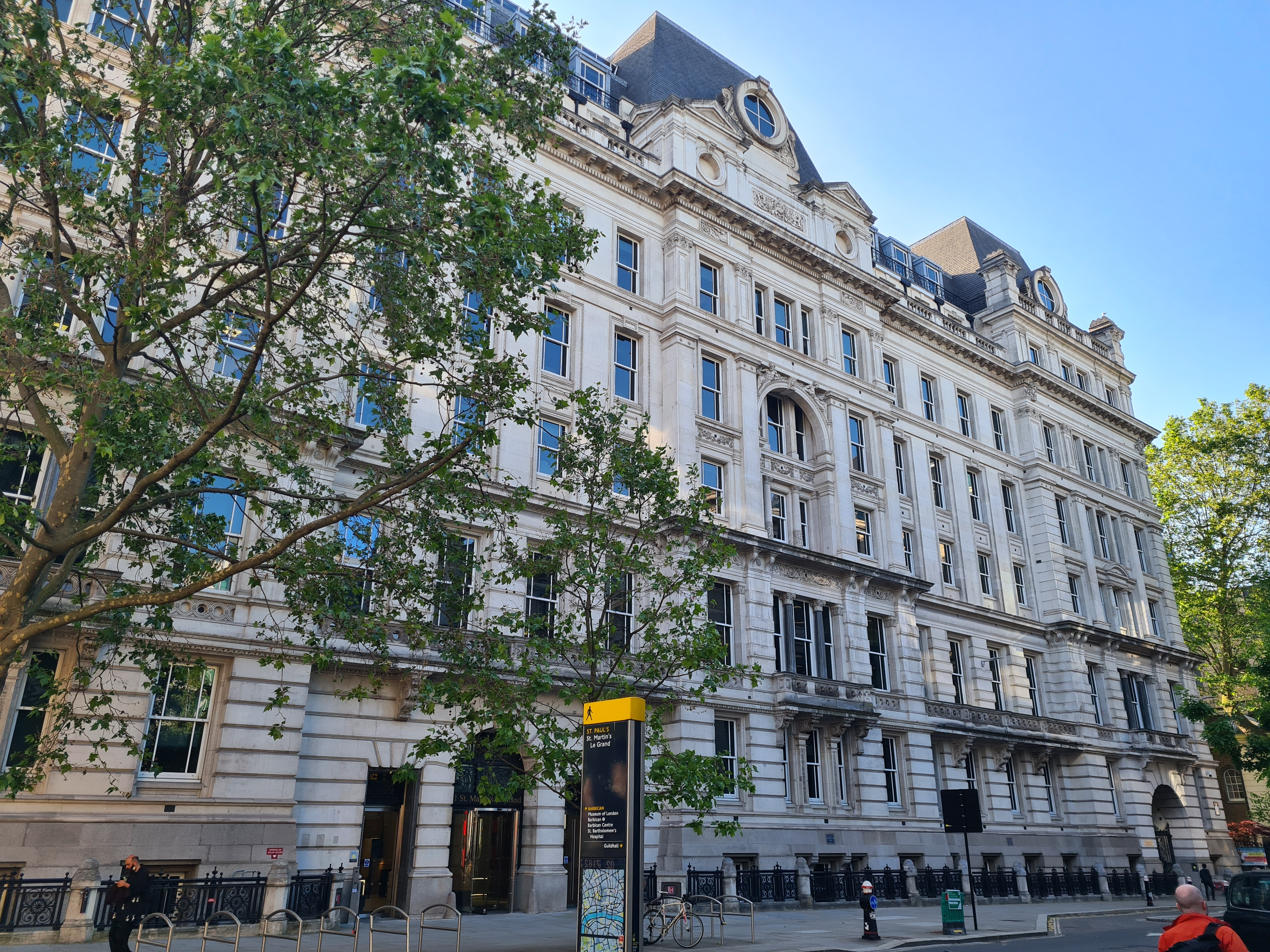
- Former Post Office Headquarters, now Nomura House

Department overview
- Formed: 31 July 1635 (public service); 29 December 1660 (Post Office Act 1660)
- Dissolved: 1 October 1969
- Superseding department: Post Office Ltd Post Office Telecommunications
- Jurisdiction: 1635–1657 England & Scotland; 1657–1784 England, Scotland & Ireland; 1784–1831 England & Scotland; 1831-1969 United Kingdom
- Headquarters: General Post Office, St Martin's le Grand, London EC2
- Secretary of State responsible: Postmaster General
- Department executive: Secretary of the Post Office (1694-1934); Director-General (1934-1966)
- Parent department: HM Government

The General Post Office (GPO) was the state postal system and telecommunications carrier of the United Kingdom until 1969. Established in England in the 17th century, the GPO was a state monopoly covering the dispatch of items from a specific sender to a specific receiver (which was to be of great importance when new forms of communication were invented); it was overseen by a Government minister, the Postmaster General. Over time its remit was extended to Scotland and Ireland, and across parts of the British Empire.

The GPO was abolished by the Post Office Act 1969, which transferred its assets to the Post Office, so changing it from a Department of State to a statutory corporation. Responsibility for telecommunications was given to Post Office Telecommunications, the successor of the GPO Telegraph and Telephones department. In 1980, the telecommunications and postal sides were split prior to British Telecommunications' conversion into a totally separate publicly owned corporation the following year as a result of the British Telecommunications Act 1981. In 1986 the Post Office Counters business was made functionally separate from Royal Mail Letters and Royal Mail Parcels (the latter being later rebranded as 'Parcelforce'). At the start of the 21st century the Post Office became a public limited company (initially called 'Consignia plc'), which was renamed 'Royal Mail Group plc' in 2002. In 2012 the counters business (known as 'Post Office Limited' since 2002) was taken out of Royal Mail Group, prior to the latter's privatisation in 2013. The privatised holding company (Royal Mail plc) was renamed International Distributions Services plc in 2022.

== Early postal services ==
In the medieval period, nobles generally employed messengers to deliver letters and other items on their behalf. In the 12th century a permanent body of messengers had been formed within the Royal Household of King Henry I, for the conveyance of royal and official correspondence. The messengers delivered their messages in person, each travelling on his own horse and taking time as needed for rest and refreshment (including stopping overnight if the length of journey required it).

Under Edward IV, however, a more efficient system was put in place (albeit temporarily) to aid communications during his war with Scotland: a number of post houses were established at twenty-mile intervals along the Great North Road, between London and Berwick, to provide the king's messengers with fresh horses for each stage of the journey; in this way they were able to travel up to a hundred miles a day. The original meaning of the word 'post' (in the sense relevant to this article) comes from this idea of having horses placed or 'posted' (Latin positi) at regular intervals along a route for the swift conveyance of letters and messengers.

Under King Henry VIII a concerted effort was made to maintain this means of conveying royal and government despatches (in times of peace as well as in time of war). To oversee the required arrangements, the king appointed Brian Tuke to serve as 'Master of the Postes'; in 1533 Tuke reported that a regular service was now in place, both between London and Berwick, and between London and Dover.

=== The Elizabethan post network ===
Under Elizabeth I the postal system gained more coherence and a greater sense of permanence.

By the 1550s five post roads were in place, connecting London with:

- Dover
- Edinburgh
- Holyhead (via Chester)
- Milford Haven (via Bristol)
- Plymouth (via Exeter).

At Dover merchant ships were regularly employed to convey letters to and from the continent; similarly, the ports of Holyhead, Milford Haven and Falmouth (served by a by-road from Plymouth) were used to connect the post road network to Ireland. As early as 1598 a regular packet service was running between Holyhead and Dublin.

In the 17th century a sixth post road was added, from London to Great Yarmouth (via Colchester), and the Plymouth post road was extended to Falmouth (which soon became the principal port for packet ships carrying letters to and from Southern Europe and the Americas).

Each post-house on the Elizabethan post roads was staffed by a postmaster (usually referred to as a 'deputy postmaster' by this time), whose main responsibility was to provide the horses. The postmaster would also provide a guide to accompany the messenger as far as the next post-house (and then see to the return of the horses afterwards). In practice most post-houses were established at roadside inns and the innkeeper served as postmaster (in return for a small salary from the Crown).

Private citizens could make use of the post-horse network, if they could afford it (in 1583 they had to pay twopence per mile for the horse, plus fourpence per stage for the guide), but it was primarily designed for the relaying of state and royal correspondence, or for the conveyance from one place to another of individuals engaged on official state business, who paid a reduced rate (fixed by statute at a penny a mile in 1548). Private correspondence was often sent using common carriers at this time, or with others who regularly journeyed from place to place (such as travelling pedlars); towns often made use of local licensed carriers, who plied their trade using a horse and cart or waggon, while the universities, along with certain municipal and other corporations, maintained their own correspondence networks.

Many letters went by foot-post rather than on horseback. Footposts or runners were employed by many towns, cities and other communities, and had been for many years. A 16th-century footpost would cover around 30 miles per day, on average. At the time of the Spanish Armada every parish was by royal command required to provide a footpost, and every town a horse-post, to help convey news in the event of an imminent invasion. In Ireland the first horse-posts appear to have been established during the Nine Years' War at the close of the 16th century, for the conveying of military intelligence.

By the early 1600s there were two options for couriers using the post system: they could either ride 'through-post', carrying the correspondence the full distance; or they could use the 'post of the packet', whereby the letters were carried by the guides from one post house to the next in a cotton-lined leather bag (although this method was only available for royal, government or diplomatic correspondence). The guides at this time were provided with a post horn, which they had to sound at regular intervals or when encountering others on the road (other road users were expected to give way to the post riders).

==== Foreign postage ====
At the start of the 16th century a system for the conveyance of foreign dispatches had been set up, organised by Flemish merchants in the City of London; but in 1558, after a dispute arose between Italian, Flemish and English merchants on the matter, the Master of the King's Posts was granted oversight of it instead. In 1619, James I appointed a separate Postmaster General 'for foreign parts', granting him (and his appointees) the sole privilege of carrying foreign correspondence to and from London. (The separate Postmaster General appointments were consolidated in 1637, but the 'foreign' and 'inland' postal services remained separate in terms of administration and accounting until the mid-19th century).

== The General Post ==
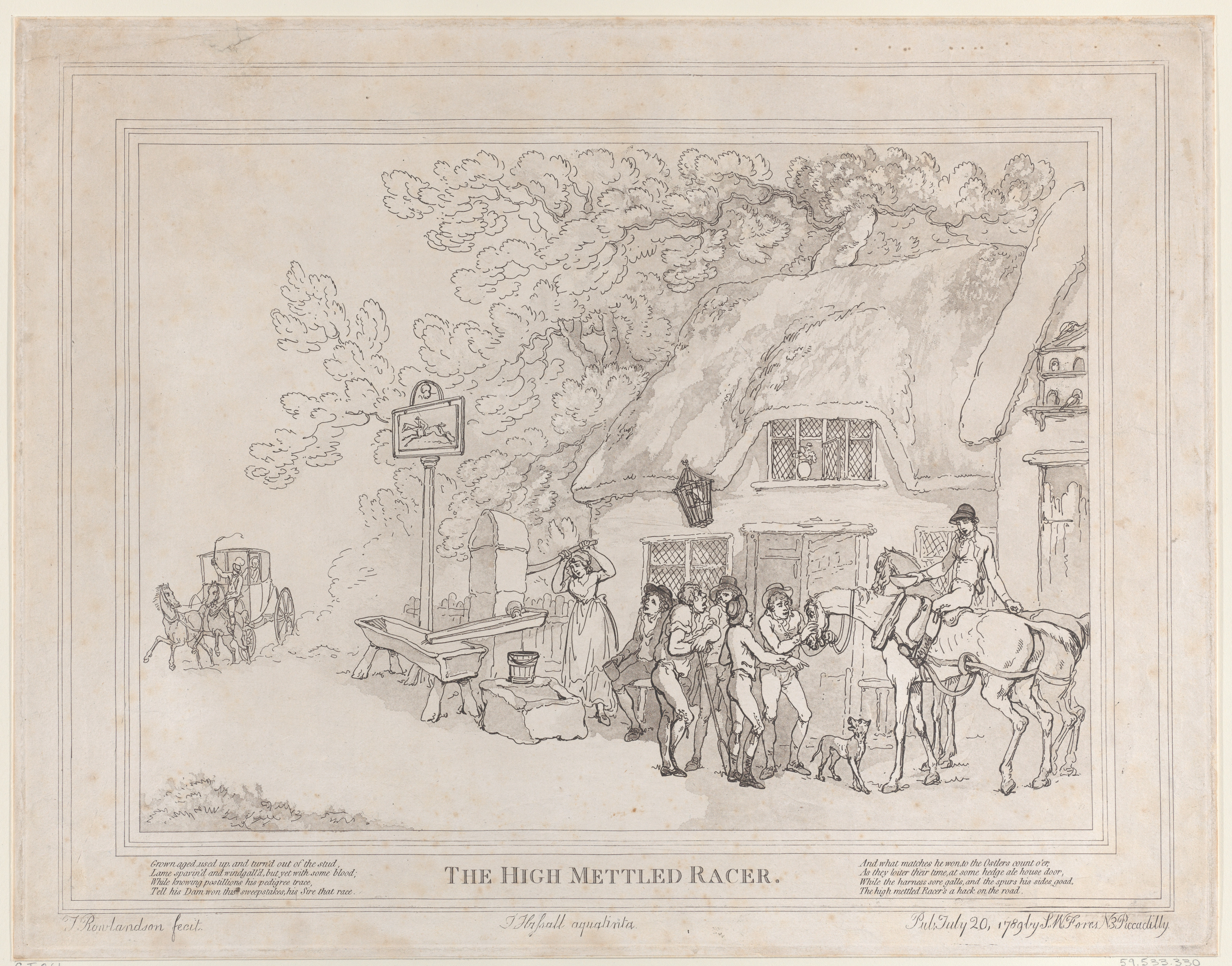
'The Post Horse' (from The Life of a Racehorse, or The High-Mettled Racer) by Thomas Rowlandson, 1789.

It was not until 1635 that a general or public post was properly established, for inland letters as for foreign ones. On 31 July that year, King Charles I issued a proclamation 'for the settling of the Letter-office of England and Scotland', an event which 'may properly be regarded as the origin of the British post-office'. By this decree, Thomas Witherings (who had been appointed 'Postmaster of England for foreign parts' three years earlier) was empowered to provide for the carriage of private letters at fixed rates 'betwixt London and all parts of His Majesty's dominions'. To this end, the royal proclamation instructed him to establish 'a running post, to run night and day', initially between London and Edinburgh, London and Holyhead and London and Plymouth, 'for the advancement of all His Majesty's subjects in their trade and correspondence'. (A similar system, running between London and Dover, had already been established by Witherings as part of his administration of the foreign posts, and he himself had proposed its extension to the rest of the realm). Witherings was required to extend the new system to other post roads 'as soon as possibly may be' (beginning with the routes to Oxford and Bristol, and to Colchester, Norwich and Yarmouth); and provision was also made for the establishment of 'bye-posts' to run to and from places not directly served by the post road system (such as Lincoln and Hull). The new system was fully and profitably running by 1636.

In order to facilitate the new arrangement, the King commanded 'all his postmasters, upon all the roads of England, to have ready in their stables one or two horses [...] to carry such messengers, with their portmantles, as shall be imployed in the said service', and they were forbidden from hiring out these horses to others on days when the mail was due. Furthermore, it was enjoined that (with a few specific exceptions) 'no other messenger or messengers, footpost or footposts, shall take up, carry, receive or deliver any letter or letters whatsoever, other than the messengers appointed by the said Thomas Witherings', thus establishing a monopoly, which (under the auspices of the Royal Mail) would remain in place until 2006.

=== Legislation and oversight ===
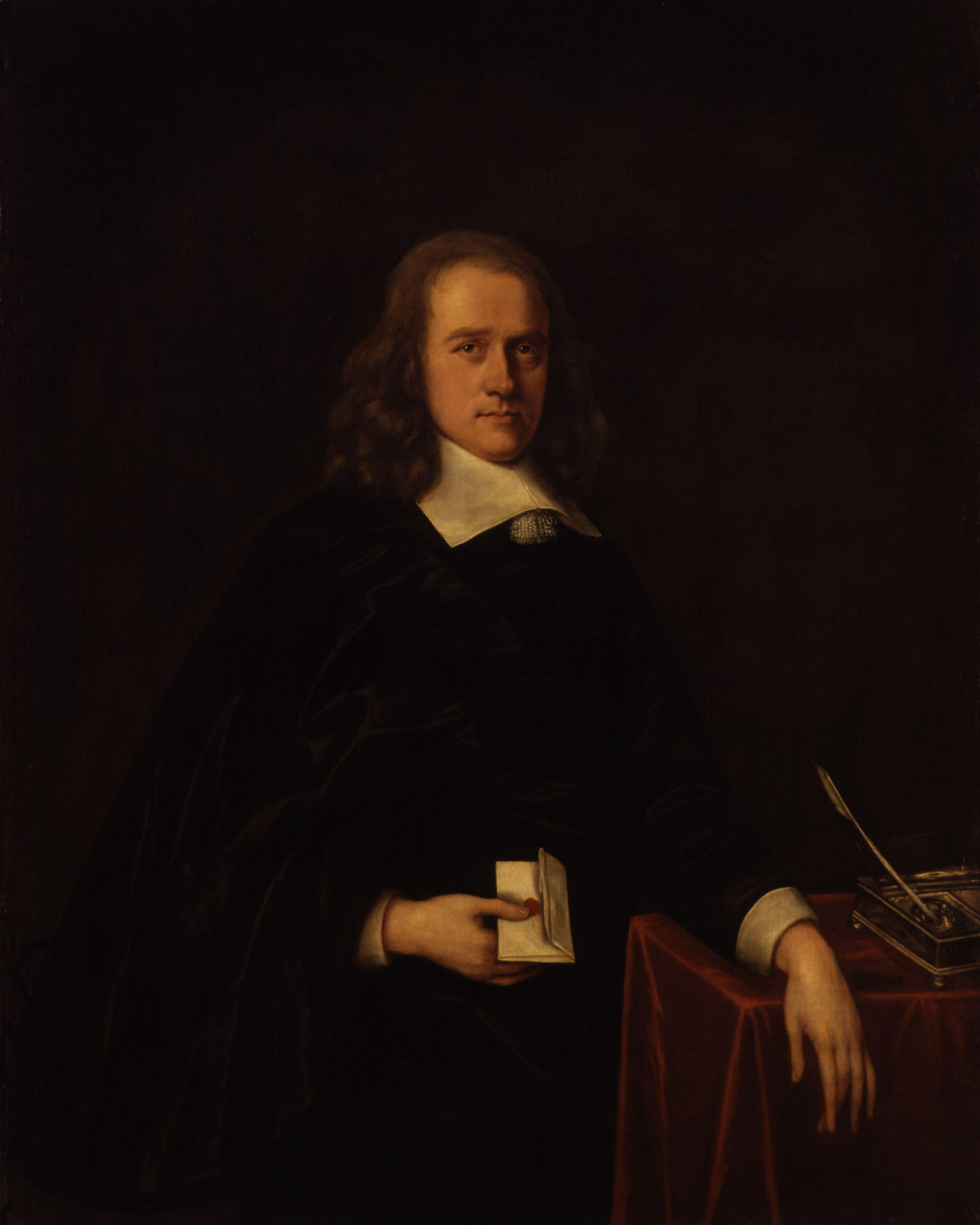
John Thurloe (Postmaster-General 1655-1660).

Under the Commonwealth the Post Office was farmed to John Manley and John Thurloe, successively. In 1657 an Act of Parliament entitled Postage of England, Scotland and Ireland Settled set up a postal system for the whole of the British Isles (the nations of which had been unified under Oliver Cromwell as a result of the Wars of the Three Kingdoms), stating that 'there shall be one General Post-Office, and one office stiled the Postmaster-Generall of England and Comptroller of the Post-Office'. The Act also reasserted the postal monopoly for letter delivery and for post-horses; and it set new rates both for carriage of letters and for 'riding post'. During the Commonwealth, what had been a weekly post service to and from London was increased to a thrice-weekly service: letters were despatched from the General Letter Office in London every Tuesday, Thursday and Saturday evening, while the inbound post arrived early in the morning on Mondays, Wednesdays and Fridays. Usually the recipient of the post paid the fee (and had the right to refuse to accept the item if they did not wish to pay); the charge was based on the distance the item had been carried so the Post Office had to keep a separate account for each item. An executive ordinance of 1654 granted Members of Parliament (and certain other office-holders) a 'franking privilege', meaning that their letters would be conveyed free of charge (an arrangement, much taken advantage of over the years, which would remain in place until 1840).

After the Restoration, the Post Office Act 1660 (12 Cha. 2. c. 35) was passed (the previous Cromwellian Act being void), confirming the arrangements in place for the Post Office, and the post of Postmaster General, and emphasizing the public and economic benefits of a General Post system:

Whereas for the maintenance of mutual correspondencies, and prevention of many inconveniences happening by private posts, several public post-offices have been heretofore erected for carrying and recarrying of letters by post to and from all parts and places within England, Scotland, and Ireland, and several posts beyond the seas, the well-ordering whereof is a matter of general concernment, and of great advantage, as well for the preservation of trade and commerce as otherwise.

To begin with the Post Office was again farmed, nominally to Henry Bishop, but the deal was bankrolled by John Wildman (a gentleman of dubious repute, who kept a tight rein on his investment). Two years later Wildman was imprisoned, implicated in a plot against the King, whereupon Bishop sold the lease on to the King's gunpowder manufacturer, Daniel O'Neill; after the latter's death, his widow the Countess of Chesterfield served out the remainder of the original seven-year term (so becoming the first female Postmaster General). Meanwhile, under the terms of a 1663 Act of Parliament, the 'rents, issues and profits' of the Post Office had been settled by the King on his brother, the Duke of York, to provide for his support and maintenance. Following the latter's accession to the throne as King James II, this income became part of the hereditary revenues of the Crown. (Note: The Post Office revenue was among the hereditary revenues surrendered to Parliament by King George III under the terms of the Civil List Act 1760.) Subsequently, under the growing scrutiny of HM Treasury, the postal service came increasingly to be viewed as a source of government income (as seen in the Post Office (Revenues) Act 1710, which increased postal charges and levied tax on the income in order to finance Britain's involvement in the War of the Spanish Succession).

=== Distribution and delivery ===
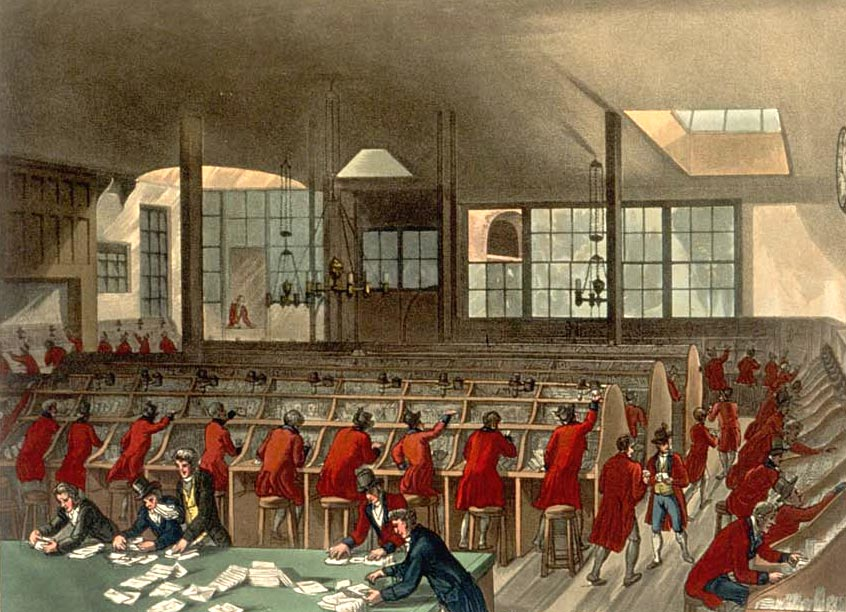
The sorting room at the General Letter Office, Lombard Street, 1809 (as pictured in The Microcosm of London).

The distribution network was centred on the General Letter Office in London (which was on Threadneedle Street prior to the Great Fire of London, after which it moved first to Bishopsgate and then to Lombard Street in 1678). The incoming post arrived each week on Mondays, Wednesdays and Fridays; it was sorted and stamped: London letters went to the 'windows' where members of the public were able to collect them from the office in person (once they had paid the requisite fee), while 'Country letters' were dispatched along the relevant post road. The outgoing post went on Tuesdays, Thursdays and Saturdays. Postage was payable by the recipient (rather than the sender) and depended on the length of the letter and the distance it had travelled; (Note: As per the 1657 Act, a single-sheet letter cost 2d up to 80 miles, 3d over 80 miles and 4d for carriage to or from Scotland.) each individual charge was calculated in London and entered into a book, which went with the letters on the road, indicating the amounts due from each postmaster for the letters delivered into his care. By the 1690s the General Letter Office had opened eight additional 'receiving-houses' in and around Westminster, where senders could submit items (which were then conveyed by letter-carriers to the central office in Lombard Street for sorting and despatch); similar arrangements were also put in place in the larger provincial towns.

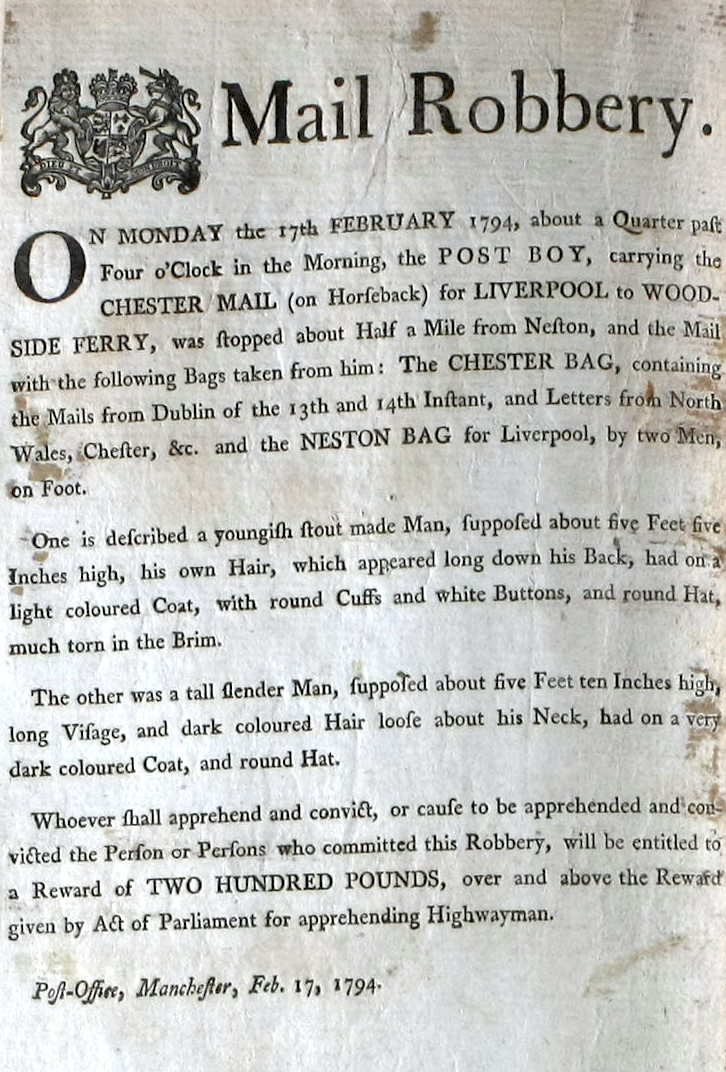
Post riders were vulnerable to attacks by highwaymen; here a reward is offered after a post boy was robbed of mail destined for Liverpool in 1794.

At first the new postal network was not especially well publicised; but in his 1673 publication Britannia, Richard Blome sought to remedy this by describing in some detail the geographical disposition of the new 'general Post-Office', which he called an 'exceeding great conveniency' for the inhabitants of the nation. At that time there were 182 Deputy Post-Masters (or 'Deputies') in England [and Wales], most of whom were stationed at the 'Stages' or stops which lay along the six main post-roads; (Note: Ireland at about this time had three post roads (the Connaught road, the Munster road and the Ulster road) likewise staffed by Deputy Post-Masters (45 in number).) and under them were sub-Post-masters, based at market towns which were not on the main post-roads but to which the service had been extended. (The sub-Post-masters, unlike the Deputies, were not employed by the Post Office.)

The expansion of the service beyond the main post-roads was in no small part due to the enterprise of the Deputy post-masters themselves, who were allowed to profit from branch services which they established and operated. In this way, the network of 'by-posts' greatly expanded in the 1670s: in 1673 Blome could write that 'there is scarce any Market-Town of note [which does not have] the benefit of the conveyance of letters to and fro'; he went on to list, County by County, both the 'Stages' on the post-roads (of which there were over 140) and the Post-towns on the branch roads (which by then numbered over 380 in total), where members of the public were able to leave letters with a Post-Master 'to be sent as directed'. Before long moves were made to incorporate the by-posts (and their income) into the national network: 'Riding Surveyors' were appointed in 1682, to travel with the post and scrutinise the Deputies' income and activity at each Stage (particularly in relation to by-letters); in later years the Surveyors served as the GPO's inspectorate, tasked with maintaining efficiency and consistency across the network (until they were finally disbanded in the 1930s). Letters addressed to destinations which lay neither on a post-road nor on a by-road were simply left at the nearest post-house; from there they might be delivered by a carrier or messenger, who would charge their own fee for doing so.

It was usual for each postmaster to employ post-boys to ride with the mail bags from one post-house to the next; the postmaster at the next post-house would then record the time of arrival, before transferring the bags to a new horse, ridden by a new post-boy, for the next stage of the journey. On the outbound journey from London, the mail for each Stage (and its associated Post-towns) was left at the relevant post-house. Arrangements for its onward delivery varied somewhat from place to place. Witherings had envisaged using 'foot-posts' for this purpose (in 1620 Justices of the Peace had been ordered to arrange appointment of two to three foot-posts in every parish for the conveyance of letters), though in practice precise details were often left to the local postmaster. On the return journey to London, bags of letters would be picked up from each post-house on the way, and taken to the General Letter Office to be sorted for despatch.

=== Packet boats and ship letters ===
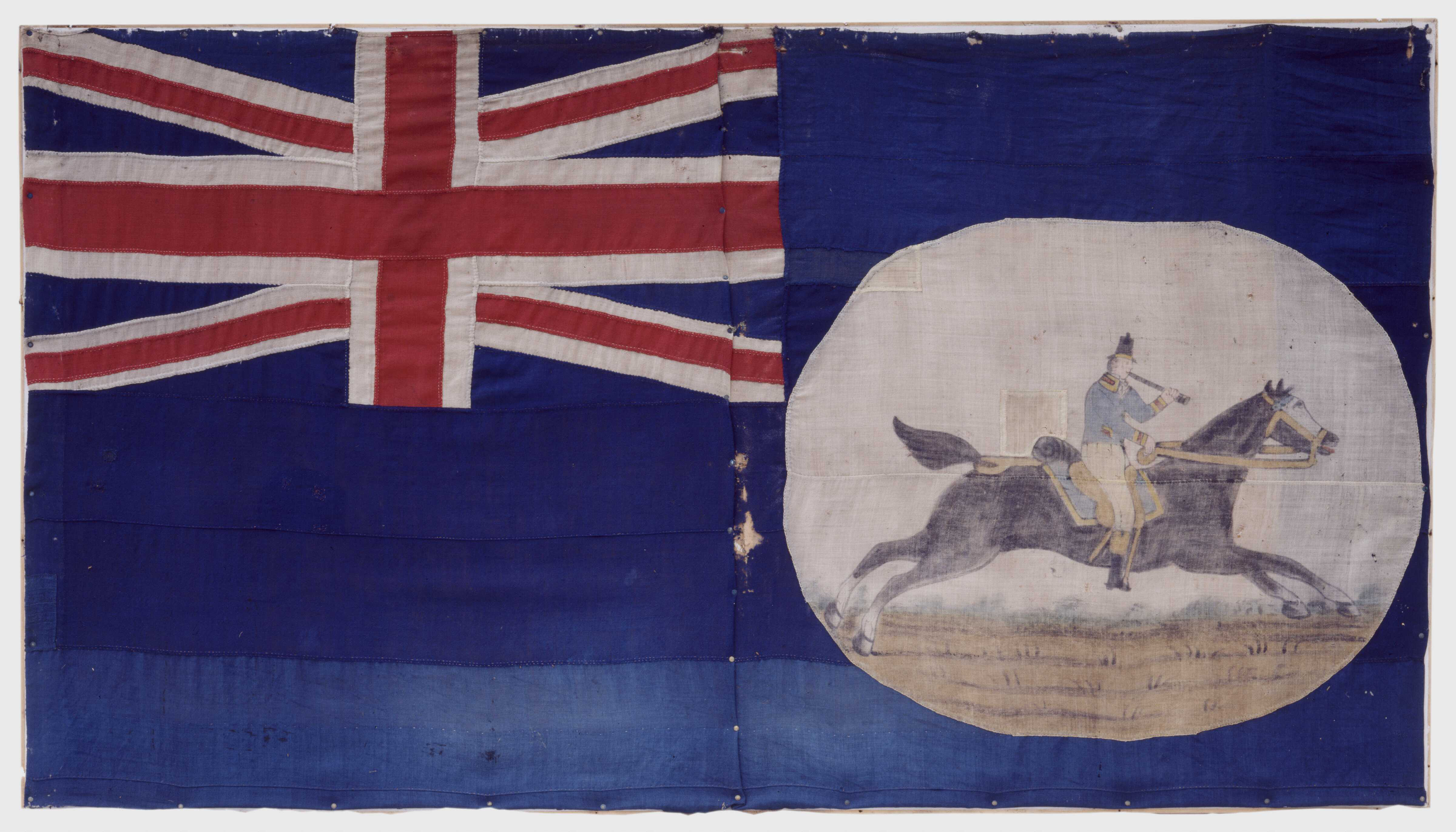
A Post Office Blue Ensign (19th century) as used on packet ships; GPO vessels had been authorised to fly flags displaying a galloping post-boy badge since 1694.

With the establishment of a regular public postal service came the need for waterborne mail services (carrying letters to and from Ireland, continental Europe and other destinations) to be placed on a more regular footing. 'Packet boats', offering a regular scheduled mail service, were already in use for the passage between Holyhead and Dublin; but for letters to and from the Continent the post was entrusted to messengers, who would make their own travel arrangements. This was far from reliable, so in the 1630s Thomas Witherings set about establishing a regular Dover-Calais packet service. During the Commonwealth packet boats ran weekly between Milford Haven and Waterford, and Chester and Dublin. (Note: Chester was used in preference to Holyhead between 1653 and 1693.) In the 1660s a packet service was put in place at Deal, to ferry letters to and from naval and merchant vessels anchored in the Downs; and in the 1690s a service was established between Donaghadee and Portpatrick (served by a foot-post running out of Glasgow).

By the end of the 17th century, additional packet services had been established between Harwich (off the Yarmouth post road) and Helvoetsluys, between Dover and Ostend/Nieuport, and between Falmouth and Corunna. The packet services were generally arranged by contract with an agent, who would commit to provide a regular mail-carrying service in exchange for a fee or subsidy. In the following century, packet services out of Falmouth began to sail to the West Indies, North America and other transatlantic destinations.

Packet boats, however, were not the only means of conveying letters overseas: there had always been the option of sending them by merchant ship, and coffee houses had long been accustomed to receiving letters and packages on behalf of ships' captains, who would carry them for a fee. The trade in these 'ship letters' was acknowledged (and legitimised) in the Post Office Acts of 1657 and 1660. Attempts were made to levy Post Office fees on these letters and 'ship letter money' was offered to captains for each letter given to a postmaster on arrival in England in order for these charges to be applied; however they were under no legal obligation to comply and the majority of ship letters evaded the extra charges.

=== The London Penny Post ===
London, Westminster and Southwark in 1682 (map by John Ogilby and William Morgan).

In 1680 William Dockwra and Robert Murray founded the 'Penny Post', which enabled letters and parcels to be sent cheaply to and from destinations in and around London. A flat fee of a penny was charged for sending letters or parcels up to a pound in weight within an area comprising the City of London, the City of Westminster and the Borough of Southwark; while two-pence was charged for items posted or delivered in the surrounding 'country' area (which included places such as Hackney, Newington, Lambeth and Islington). The Penny Post letter-carriers operated from seven main sorting offices around London, which were supplemented by between four and five hundred 'receiving houses' in all the principal streets in the area, where members of the public could post items. (Prior to the establishment of the Penny Post, the only location where letters could be posted in London was the General Letter Office in Lombard Street.) The receiving-houses were often found in public houses, coffee houses or other retail premises. Deliveries were made six or eight times a day in central London (and a minimum of four times a day in the outskirts).

The innovation was a great success, and within two years a court ruling obliged the London Penny Post to come under the authority of the Postmaster General. Although now part of the GPO, the London Penny Post continued to operate entirely independently of the General (or 'Inland') Post until 1854 (when the two systems were combined). An attempt by Charles Povey to set up a rival halfpenny post in 1709 was halted after several months' operation; however Povey's practice of having letter-carriers ring a bell to attract custom was adopted by the Post Office and went on to be employed in major cities until the mid-19th century.

In 1761 permission was given for the establishment of penny-post arrangements elsewhere in the realm, to function along the same lines as the London office, if they could be made financially viable; by the end of the century there were penny-post systems operating in Birmingham, Bristol, Dublin, Edinburgh and Manchester (to be joined by Glasgow and Newcastle-upon-Tyne in the 1830s).

In 1801 the cost of posting a letter within the central London area was doubled; thenceforward the London District Post was known as the 'Two-penny Post' until its amalgamation into the General Post 53 years later.

=== Expansion at home and abroad ===
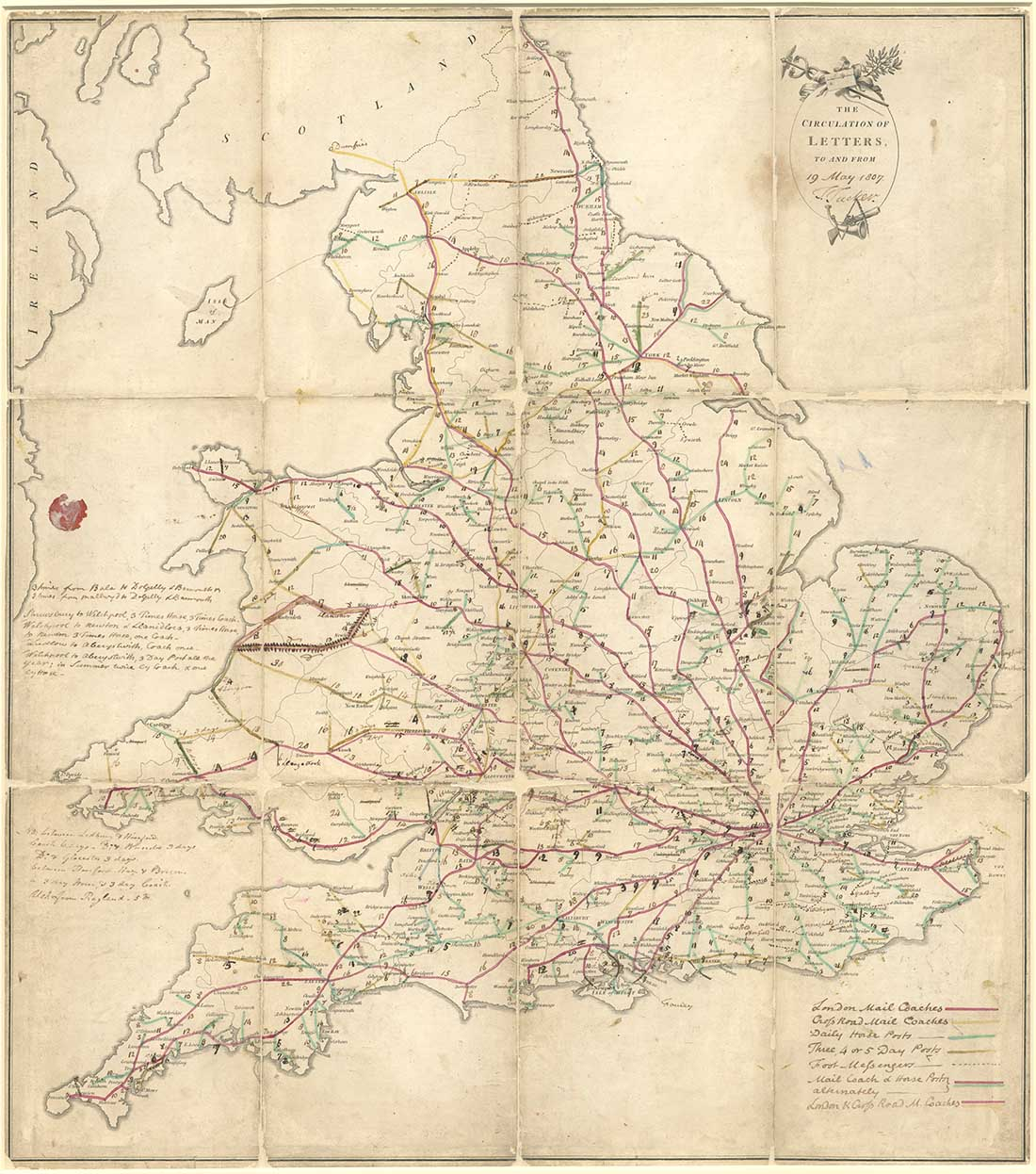
A map showing postal routes (served by mail coaches, horse posts and foot messengers) in 1807.

In the 1680s a post office was established in Jamaica, which set down postal rates for deliveries both within and beyond the island.

In 1691 the Lords of Trade and Plantations commissioned Thomas Neale to establish postal services in the North American colonies; he appointed Andrew Hamilton (who was already Postmaster-General of the Colony of Massachusetts) as his deputy. By 1699 there was a regular weekly post in place between Boston, New York and New Castle.

A Scottish Post Office was established in 1695 (although the main post-road to Edinburgh continued to be managed from London). The Scottish terrain was notoriously challenging: in 1698, Sir Robert Sinclair, when offered the entire revenue of the Scottish posts plus several hundred pounds per annum in exchange for overseeing the office, politely declined. There were no horse posts in Scotland (beyond the road from London) in the early 18th century; instead foot posts were invariably used, providing regular services to and from Edinburgh (going as far north as Thurso and as far west as Inveraray). Post runners travelled from Edinburgh to Glasgow and back three times a week: setting off at midnight, they would arrive at their destination the following evening. It would not be until the middle of the century that horse posts were established on a regular basis between Edinburgh and Glasgow and the other principal burghs. (Note: A horse post was briefly established between Edinburgh and Inverness in 1716, but only as a temporary measure (to aid communication with General Cadogan).)

In 1710 the Scottish and English establishments were united by statute. By virtue of the same Act of Parliament (the Post Office (Revenues) Act 1710), the functions of the 'general letter office and post office' in the City of London were set out, and the establishment of 'chief letter offices' in Edinburgh, Dublin, New York and the Leeward Islands was enjoined.

The Irish post at this time operated as part of the GPO under a Deputy Postmaster General based in Dublin; but in 1784 an Act was passed by the Parliament of Ireland providing for an independent Post Office in Ireland under its own Postmaster General (an arrangement that remained in place until 1831).

==== Ralph Allen and the cross-posts ====
The established post roads in Britain ran to and from London. The use of other roads required government permission (for example, it was only after much lobbying that a 'cross-post' between Bristol and Exeter was authorised, in 1698; previously mail between the two cities had to be sent via London). In 1720 Bath postmaster Ralph Allen, who had a vision for improving the situation, took over responsibility for the cross-posts (i.e. routes connecting one post road to another) and bye-posts (connecting to places off the main post roads). (Note: The term 'bye-posts' also covered "letters not going or coming from, to or through London".) He greatly expanded the network of post towns served by the General Post, and at the same time did much to reform its workings. He introduced the use of post bills to track the movement of letters, which enabled him accurately to collect the revenue for the items for which he was responsible. An astute businessman, he succeeded in turning his farm of the cross-posts (which had long been loss-making for the Post Office) to a highly profitable enterprise.

==== Direct delivery ====
In 1772 the Court of the King's Bench ruled that letters ought to be delivered directly to recipients within the boundaries of each post town at no additional cost. Often a messenger with a locked satchel would be employed by the postmaster to deliver and receive items of mail around town; he would alert people to his presence by ringing a hand bell. While postmasters were not obliged to deliver items to places outside the boundary, they could agree to do so on payment of an extra fee.

=== New modes of transport ===
==== Road ====
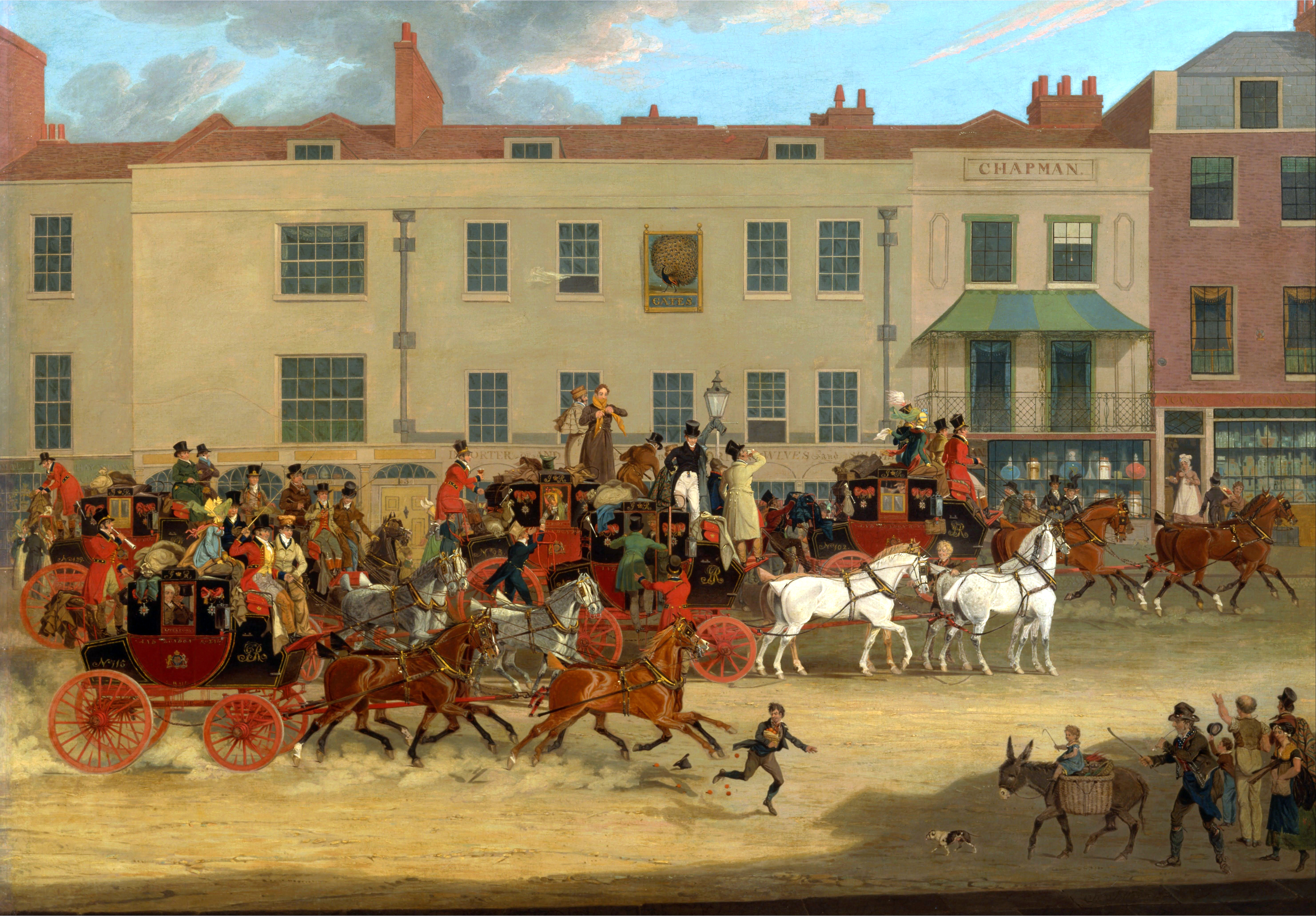
North Country Mails at the Peacock, Islington by James Pollard (1821).

In the 1780s, Britain's General Post network was revolutionised by theatrical impresario John Palmer's idea of using mail coaches in place of the longstanding use of post horses. After initial resistance from the postal authorities, a trial took place in 1784, by which it was demonstrated that a mail coach departing from Bristol at 4pm would regularly arrive in London at 9 o'clock the following morning: a day and a half quicker than the post horses. As a result, the conveyance of letters by mail coach, under armed guard, was approved by Act of Parliament.

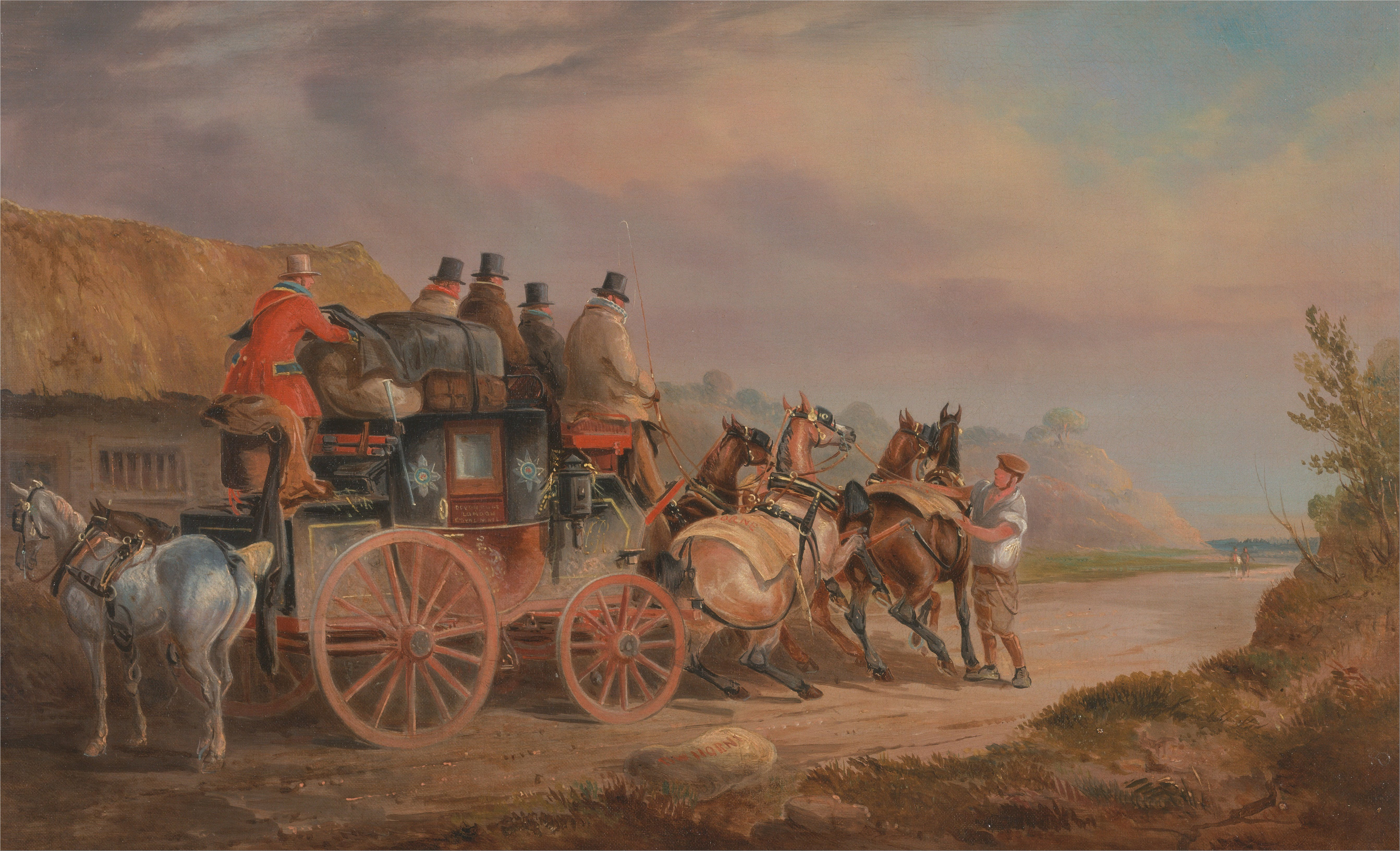
A fresh team of horses being harnessed to the Devonshire-London mail coach in the 1820s (Charles Cooper Henderson).

Mail coaches were similar in design to the passenger-carrying stage coaches, but were smaller, lighter and more manoeuvrable (being pulled by a team of four horses, rather than six as was usual for a stage coach at that time). The long-established practice of 'riding post' was acknowledged through the provision of four seats inside the coach for passengers. The mail bags were carried in a locked box at the back, above which sat a scarlet-coated guard. While the coaches and coachmen were provided by contractors, the guards worked for the Post Office. As well as two pistols and a blunderbuss, each guard carried a secure timepiece by which departure times at each stage of the journey were strictly regulated.

Mail coaches were introduced in Ireland in 1790, on the Dublin-Cork and Dublin-Belfast roads to begin with (and then likewise on the other major post roads in the early 1800s). From 1815 the coaches were provided by Charles Bianconi, initially as a speculative venture and later under contract.

==== Rail ====
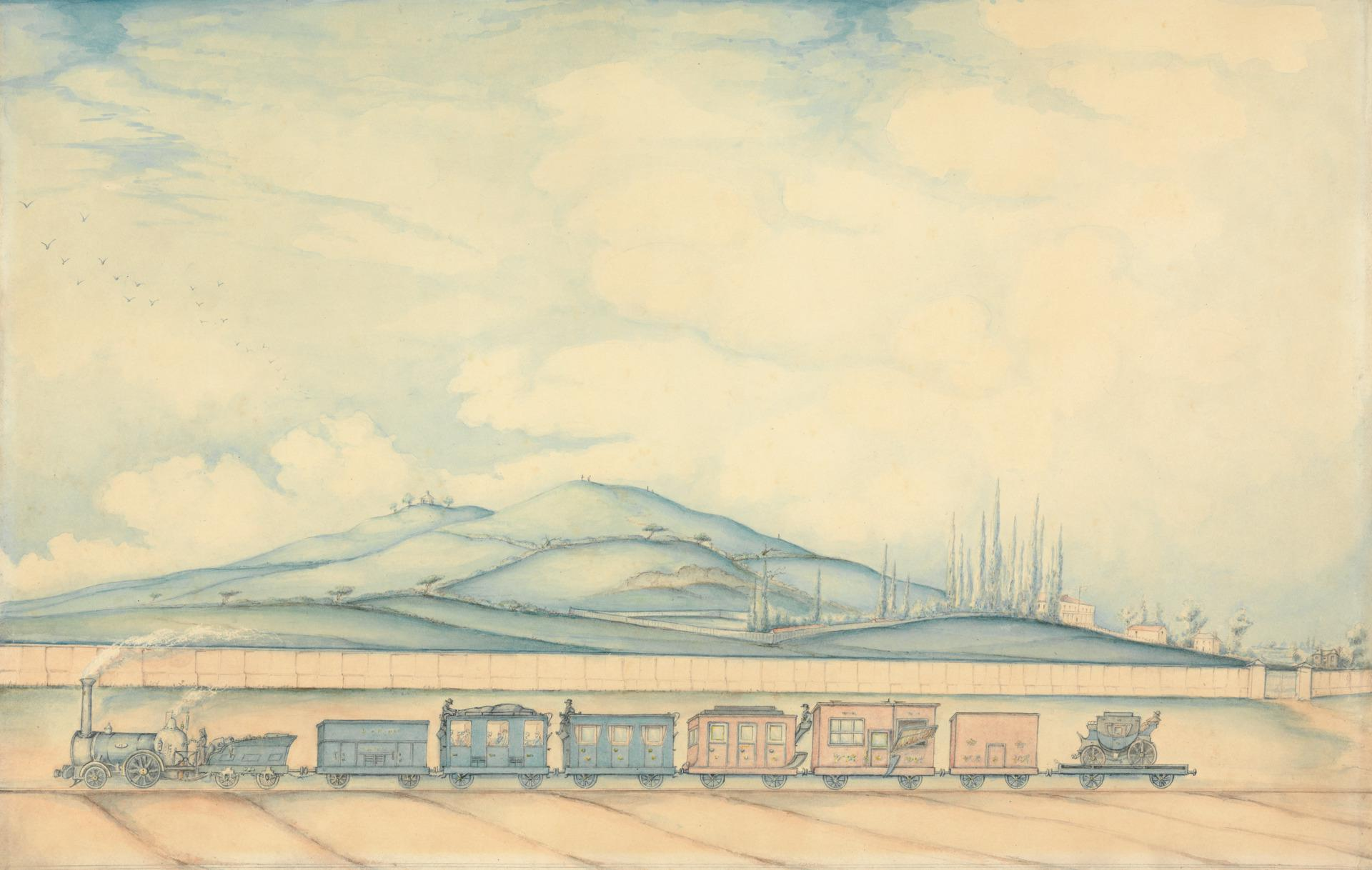
The London and Birmingham Railway at Primrose Hill, 'showing the Travelling Post' (mid-19th century).

In 1830 mail was carried by train for the first time, on the newly-opened Liverpool and Manchester Railway; over the next decade the railways replaced mail coaches as the principal means of conveyance (the last mail coach departed from London on 6 January 1846). The first Travelling Post Office (TPO) was introduced in 1837, and these began to be widely used enabling mail to be sorted in transit; TPO operation was greatly aided by the invention in 1852 of a trackside 'mail-bag apparatus' which enabled bags to be collected and deposited en route. By the 1860s the Post Office had contracts with around thirty different rail companies.

The development of a national rail network, quickly embraced by the Post Office, coincided with the ground-breaking introduction of uniform penny postage (qv below) and to a significant extent it made possible the dynamic growth of the UK postal service that followed.

==== Maritime ====
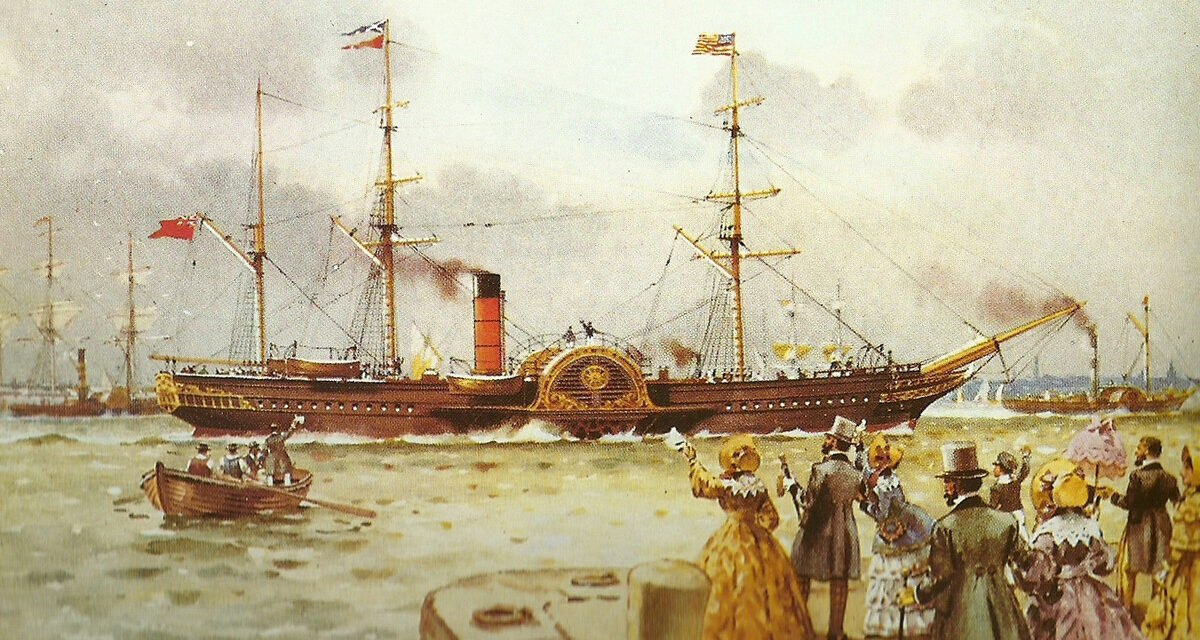
RMS Britannia, a transatlantic paddle steamer of the British and North American Royal Mail Steam Packet Company, in 1840.

The development of marine steam propulsion inevitably affected the packet ship services. Since the 1780s these had been run on behalf of the Post Office by private contractors, who depended on supplementary income from fee-paying passengers in order to make a profit; but in the 19th-century steamships began to lure the passengers away. At some considerable cost the Post Office resolved to build and operate its own fleet of steam vessels, but the service became increasingly inefficient. In 1823 The Admiralty took over managing the long-distance routes out of Falmouth, while services to and from Ireland and the continent were increasingly put out to commercial tender.

Eventually, in 1837, the Admiralty took over control of the whole operation (and with it the remaining Post Office vessels). Subsequently, contracts for carrying mail began to be awarded to new large-scale shipping lines: the Royal Mail Steam Packet Company ran ships out of Southampton to the West Indies and South America, the British and North American Royal Mail Steam Packet Company covered the North Atlantic route, while P&O provided services on eastward routes to the Mediterranean (and onwards to India and eventually Australia). From 1840 vessels carrying mail under Admiralty contract had the privilege of being badged and designated as Royal Mail Ships (RMS). Oversight of the sea mails and packet services reverted from the Admiralty to the Post Office in 1860.

=== Uniform Penny Postage ===
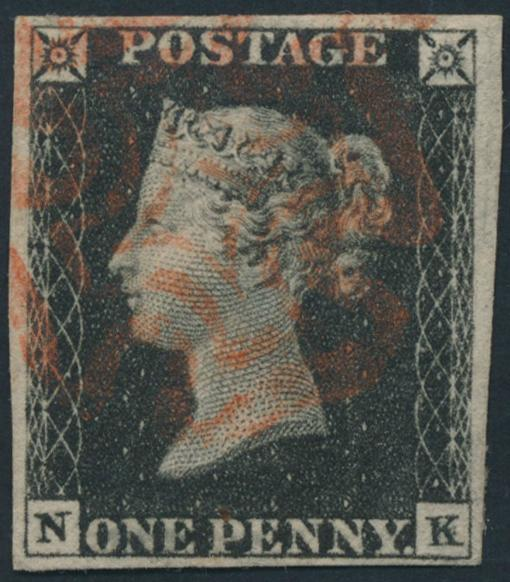
A 'Penny Black' stamp issued in 1840.

In 1840 the Uniform Penny Post was introduced, which incorporated the two key innovations of a uniform postal rate, which cut administrative costs and encouraged use of the system, and adhesive pre-paid stamp. Packets (weighing up to 16 ounces (450 g)) could also be sent by post, the cost of postage varying with the weight. The reforms were devised and overseen by Rowland Hill, having been initially proposed in Parliament by Robert Wallace MP. Rowland Hill developed his argument for a uniform postal rate while serving as secretary of the South Australian Colonization Commission, and there are strong parallels between Hill's economic argument for uniform pricing of postal rates and the uniform pricing of land in Edward Gibbon Wakefield's scheme of colonization that was followed in South Australia. Hill's proposals, published in a 100-page pamphlet in 1837, were strongly repudiated by the Post Office under its long-standing Secretary Sir Francis Freeling and by the Postmaster General Lord Lichfield, who described them in the House of Lords as being 'of all the wild and visionary schemes [...] the most extraordinary'; but among the general public, by contrast, Post Office reform became something of a cause célèbre, with petitions and public meetings attracting large levels of support. With significant public backing, the Penny Postage Bill was introduced to Parliament in July 1839 and passed into law just four weeks later. The effect of the change was immediate: the number of letters sent annually increased from 76 million in 1839 to just under 169 million in 1840; by 1864 that figure had more than quadrupled to 679m.

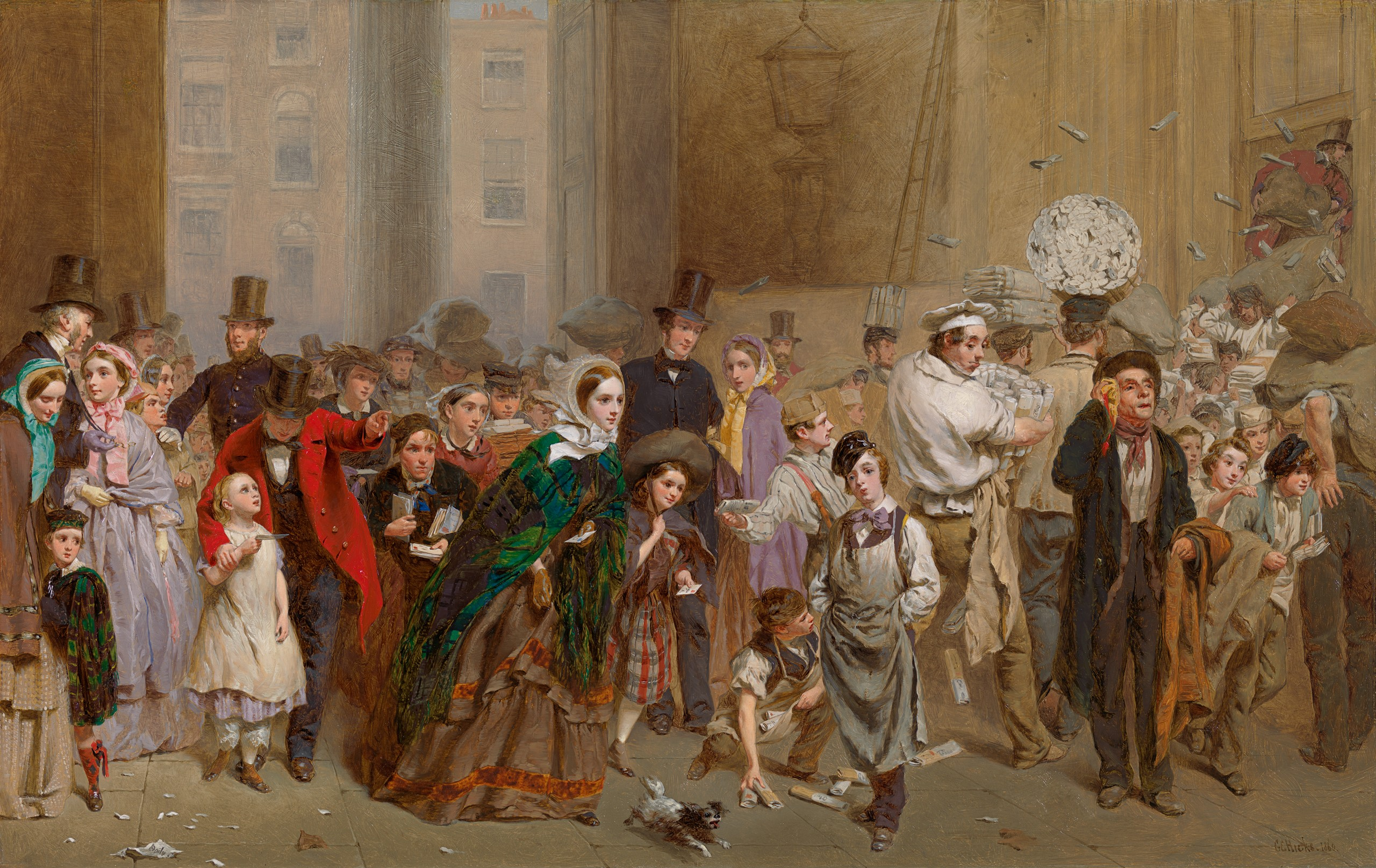
The General Post Office, One Minute to Six: George Hicks's 1860 painting of a motley crowd surging into the General Post Office building to catch the evening mails conveys something of the impact of the penny post across all parts of society.

By the 1850s the postal system was described as having become 'universal all over the three kingdoms: no village, however insignificant, being without its receiving-house'. In 1855 a network of 10,498 post offices was in place across the country (made up of 920 Head Post Offices and 9,578 Sub-Post Offices and Receiving Offices). The following year postal operations within the capital began to be revised: the old London district was subdivided into ten smaller districts, each with its own district sorting office. (Note: These new London districts were named after points of the compass (being notionally centred on St. Martin's Le Grand, where a new purpose-built GPO headquarters had opened in 1829).) The 1850s also saw the widespread introduction of cast-iron road-side post boxes where the public could deposit their outgoing mail; while at the same time the Post Office encouraged householders to insert letter boxes in their front doors for ease of delivery.

Few other organisations, either of state or of commerce, could rival the early Victorian Post Office in the extent of its national coverage, and its counters began to be relied upon for providing other government services (e.g. the issuing of licences of various types). For many people the Post Office was, to all intents and purposes, the public face of the State. It had functioned for decades (alongside the Board of Stamps and Taxes, HM Customs and the Excise office) as a significant revenue-raising department for the Government (albeit a costly one); but increasingly in this period, the GPO came to be viewed (both by those in power and by the general public) less as a source of revenue and more as a public service.

In 1848 Hill, who was an educationalist by background, had introduced a book post service. Pre-stamped postcards, costing one halfpenny (i.e. half the price of a letter) to post, first appeared in 1870, with 75 million of them being posted in that first year. In 1883 Henry Fawcett (whom Gladstone had appointed Postmaster General three years earlier) inaugurated a parcel post service by arrangement with the railway companies; as a result the term 'postman' replaced 'letter-carrier' in the GPO's official nomenclature from October of that year.

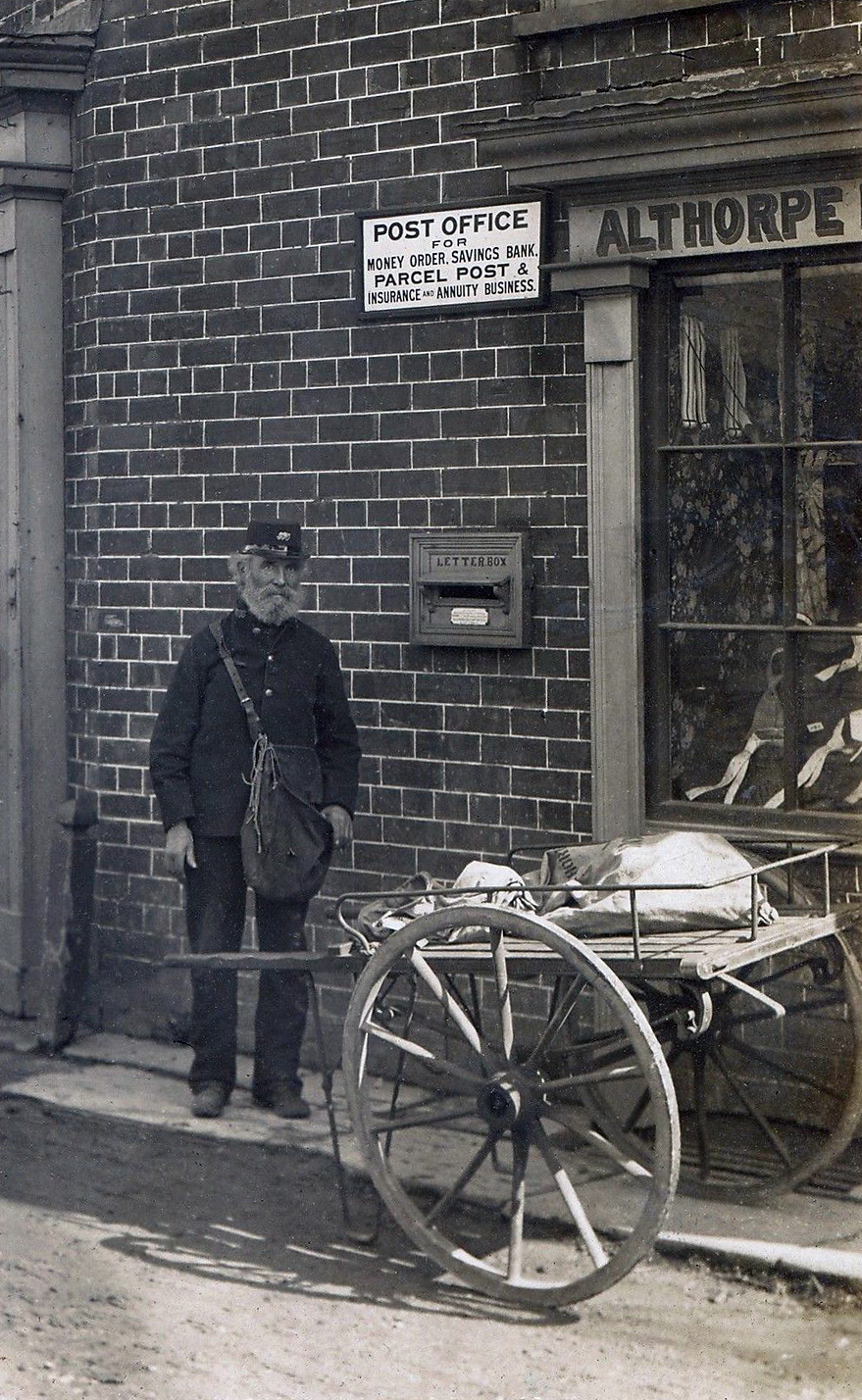
A postman with his mail cart outside Althorpe Post Office, Lincolnshire (c. 1890).

Uniform Penny Postage only covered delivery to (and within) a recognised post town; by 1864 this accounted for around 95% of letters posted. Onward delivery of mail to rural addresses, however, continued to incur an additional fee until the GPO's 'Jubilee concession' of 1897, by which it undertook to guarantee delivery to every house in the kingdom at a standard rate.

International postage rates had been standardised to some extent through the establishment of the General Postal Union in 1874; however, the application of additional transit charges by the GPO meant that correspondence within the British Empire subsequently cost more than the 2½d rate for sending letters within the Union. Campaigns for a 'universal penny post', or global flat rate, were spearheaded in the UK by John Henniker Heaton MP; his vision was achieved in part with the introduction of an 'imperial penny post' in 1897.

== Financial services ==
=== The Money Order Office ===
In 1838 the Money Order Office was established, to provide a secure means of transferring money to people in different parts of the country (or world), and to discourage people from sending cash by post. The money order system had first been introduced as a private enterprise by three Post Office clerks in 1792, with the permission of the Postmaster General.

Alongside money orders, postal orders were introduced in 1881 (on the initiative of Henry Fawcett and George Chetwynd), which were cheaper and easier to cash. The Money Order Office, however, declined to administer them (it was not until 1904 that the Postal Order Branch and the Money Order Department were finally united); instead, Chetwynd himself (in his role as Receiver and Accountant-General of the Post Office) took responsibility.

Postal orders and money orders were vital at this time for transactions between small businesses, as well as individuals, because bank transfer facilities were only available to major businesses and for larger sums of money.

=== The Post Office Savings Bank ===
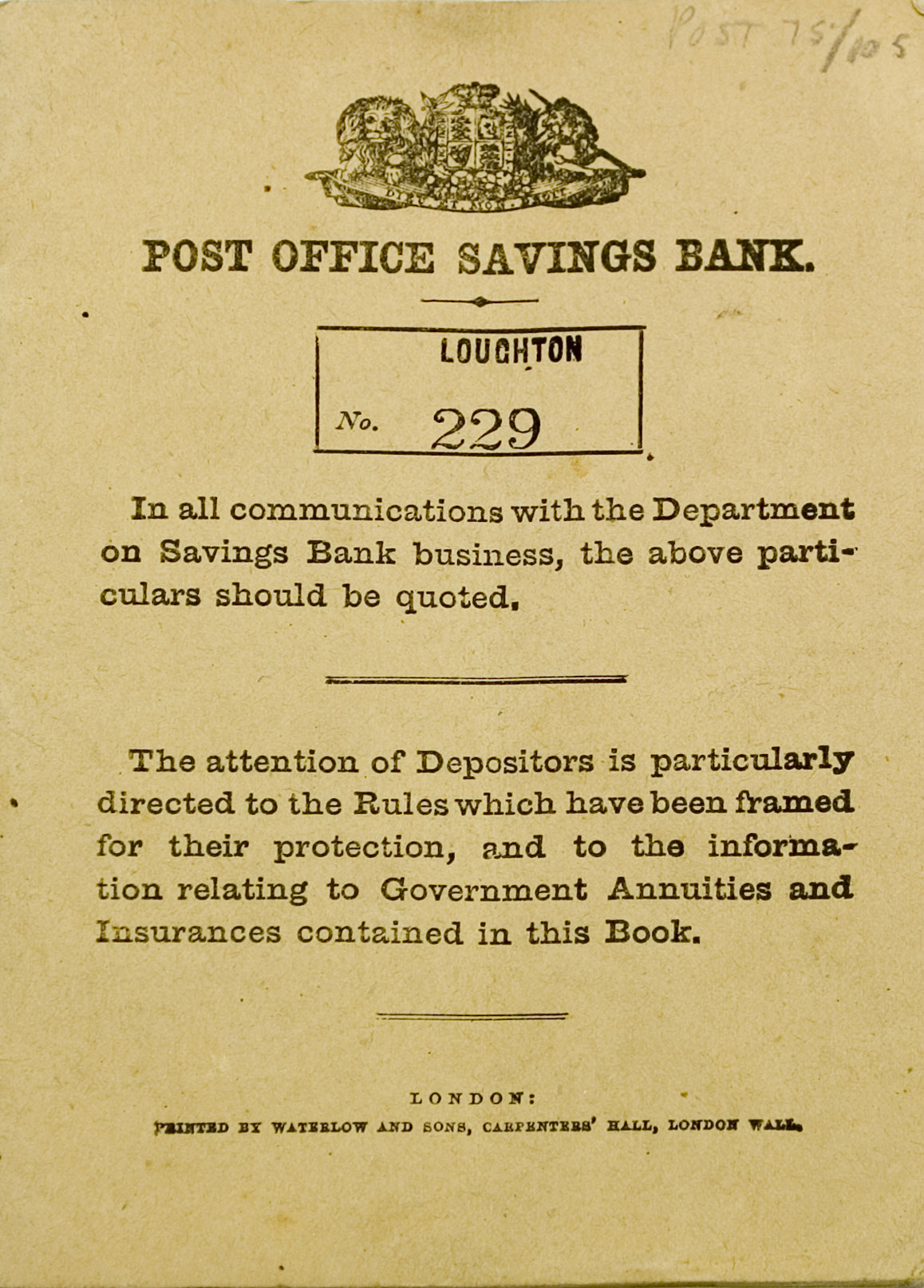
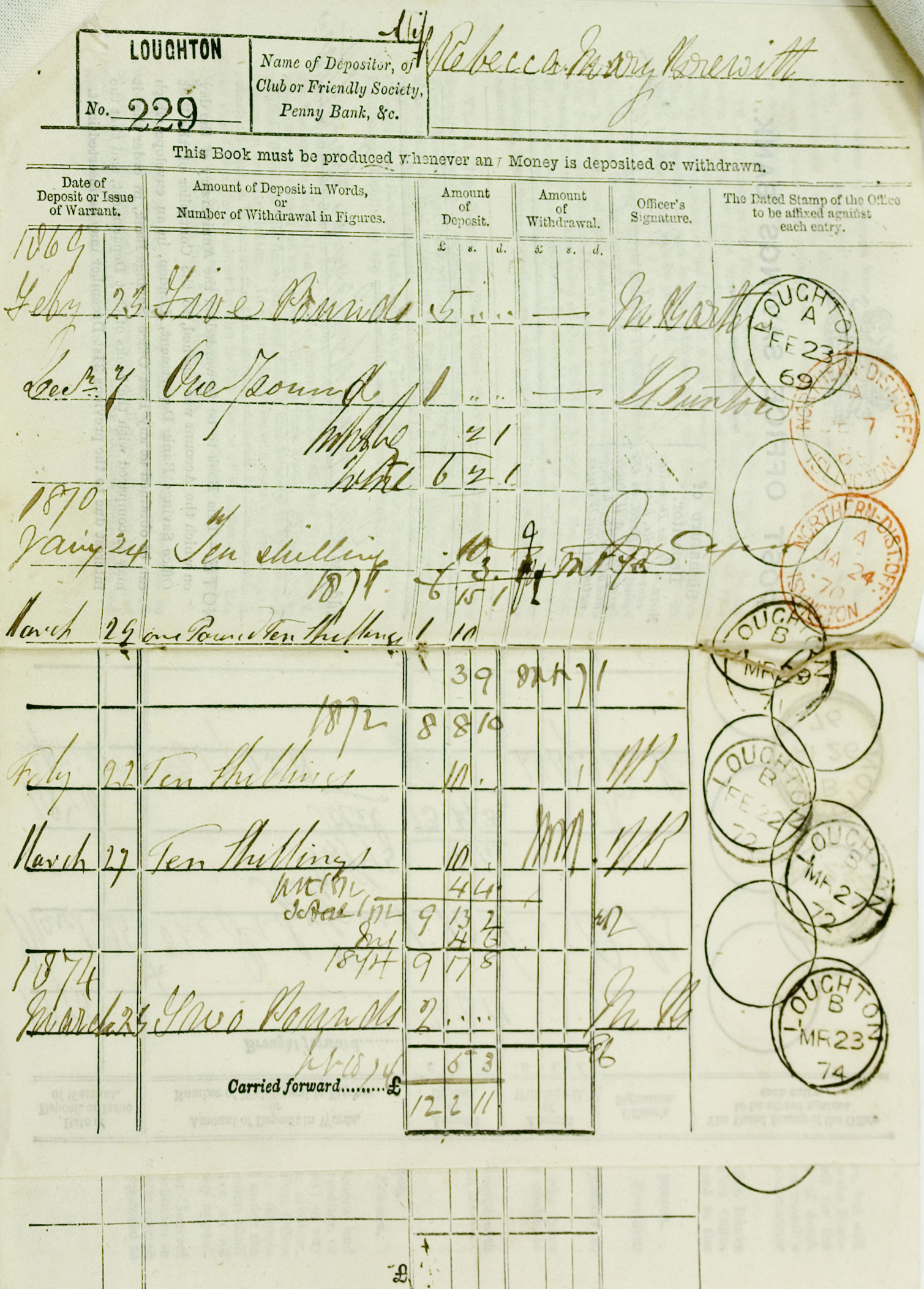
A Post Office Savings Bank deposit book, dating from 1869.

The Post Office Savings Bank (POSB) was inaugurated in 1861, when there were few banks outside major towns; George Chetwynd and Frank Ives Scudamore were its key proponents. Two years later, 2,500 post offices were offering a savings service. Henry Fawcett in the 1880s greatly expanded its operations and encouraged the use of savings stamps; by the end of the century the number of POSB branches had increased to 14,000, making it the largest banking system in the country.

=== Other services ===
Gradually more financial services were offered by post offices, including government stocks and bonds in 1880, insurance and annuities in 1888, and war savings certificates in 1916. In 1909 old age pensions were introduced, payable at post offices. In 1956 a lottery bond called the Premium Bond was introduced. In the mid-1960s the GPO was asked by the government to expand into banking services which resulted in the creation of the National Giro in 1968.

== New communication systems ==
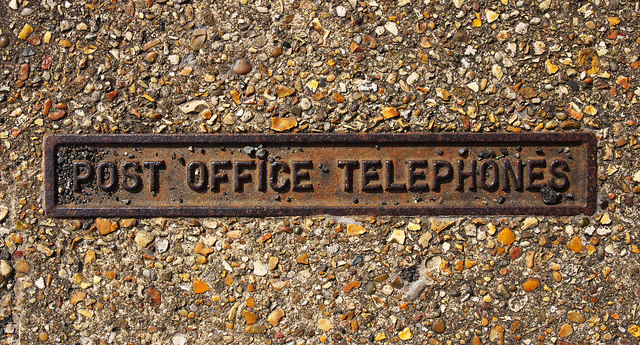
GPO manhole cover in Belfast.

When new forms of communication came into existence in the 19th and early 20th centuries the GPO claimed monopoly rights on the basis that like the postal service they involved delivery from a sender and to a receiver. The theory was used to expand state control of the mail service into every form of electronic communication possible on the basis that every sender used some form of distribution service. These distribution services were considered in law as forms of electronic post offices. This applied to telegraph and telephone switching stations.

=== Telegraph ===
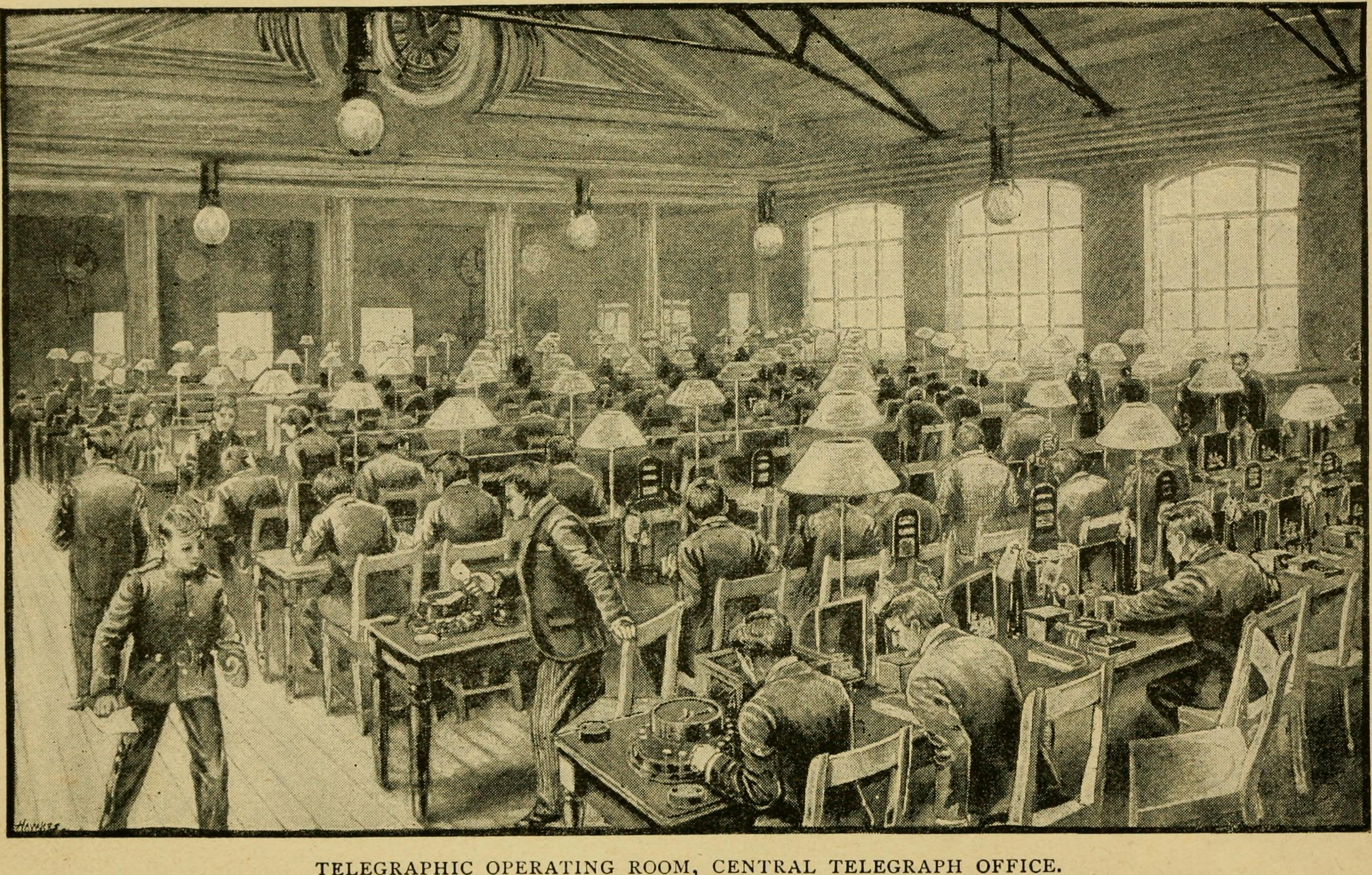
Telegraphic Operating Room in the Central Telegraph Office (GPO West), St Martin's Le Grand, London (1897).

In 1846, the Electric Telegraph Company, the world's first public telegraph company, was established in the UK and developed a nationwide communications network. Several other private telegraph companies soon followed. The Telegraph Act 1868 granted the Postmaster General the right to acquire inland telegraph companies in the United Kingdom and the Telegraph Act 1869 conferred on the Postmaster General a monopoly in telegraphic communication in the UK. The responsibility for the 'electric telegraphs' was officially transferred to the GPO in 1870. Overseas telegraphs did not fall within the monopoly. The private telegraph companies that already existed were bought out. The new combined telegraph service had 1,058 telegraph offices in towns and cities and 1,874 offices at railway stations. 6,830,812 telegrams were transmitted in 1869 producing revenue of £550,000. Duplex working was introduced in 1873, and quadruplex in 1878. The fledgling department was overseen by Frank Scudamore (who had devised and carried out the plan for nationalisation), but he resigned in 1875 after he was found to have diverted money from the Savings Bank and elsewhere in a vain attempt to mitigate the fast-rising costs of the expanding operation.

London's Central Office in the first decade of nationalized telegraphy created two levels of service. High-status circuits catering to the state, international trade, sporting life, and imperial business. Low-status circuits directed toward the local and the provincial. These distinct telegraphic orbits were connected to different types of telegraph instruments operated by differently gendered telegraphists. By the end of the century over 90,000,000 telegrams a year were being sent over Post Office wires.

=== Telephone ===
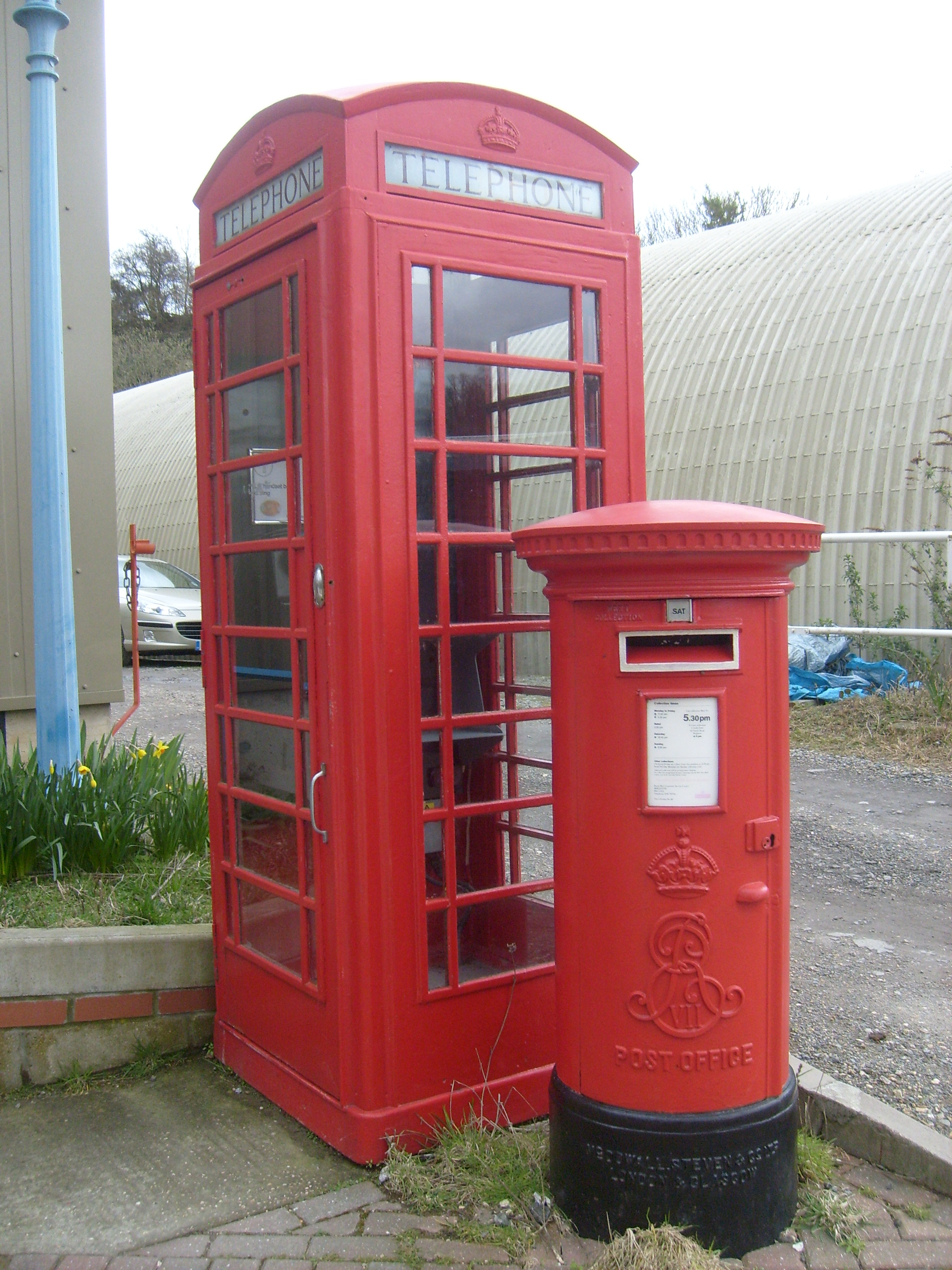
A GPO red telephone box and Edward VII pillar box.

The Post Office commenced its telephone business in 1878, however the vast majority of telephones were initially connected to independently run networks. In December 1880, the Postmaster General obtained a court judgement that telephone conversations were, technically, within the remit of the Telegraph Act. The General Post Office then licensed all existing telephone networks.

The effective nationalisation of the UK telecommunications industry occurred in 1912 with the takeover of the National Telephone Company which left only a few municipal undertakings independent of the GPO (in particular the Hull Telephones Department (now privatised) and the telephone system of Guernsey). The GPO took over the company on 1 January 1912; transferring 1,565 exchanges and 9,000 employees at a cost of £12,515,264.

The GPO installed several automatic telephone exchanges from several vendors in trials at Darlington on 10 October 1914 and Dudley on 9 September 1916 (rotary system), Fleetwood (relay exchange from Sweden), Grimsby (Siemens), Hereford (Lorimer) and Leeds (Strowger). The GPO then selected the Strowger system for small and medium cities and towns.

The telephone systems of Jersey and the Isle of Man, obtained from the NTC were offered for sale to the respective governments of the islands. Both initially refused, but the States of Jersey did eventually take control of their island's telephones in 1923.

In 1937, the GPO placed into service a wideband coaxial carrier system between London and Birmingham for trunk telephony and experimental television transmission. The system used carrier telephony techniques similar to contemporary Bell System coaxial cable systems, employing frequency-division multiplexing, crystal filters, and negative-feedback repeaters to carry up to 320 simultaneous telephone circuits on a single coaxial route.

=== Radio ===
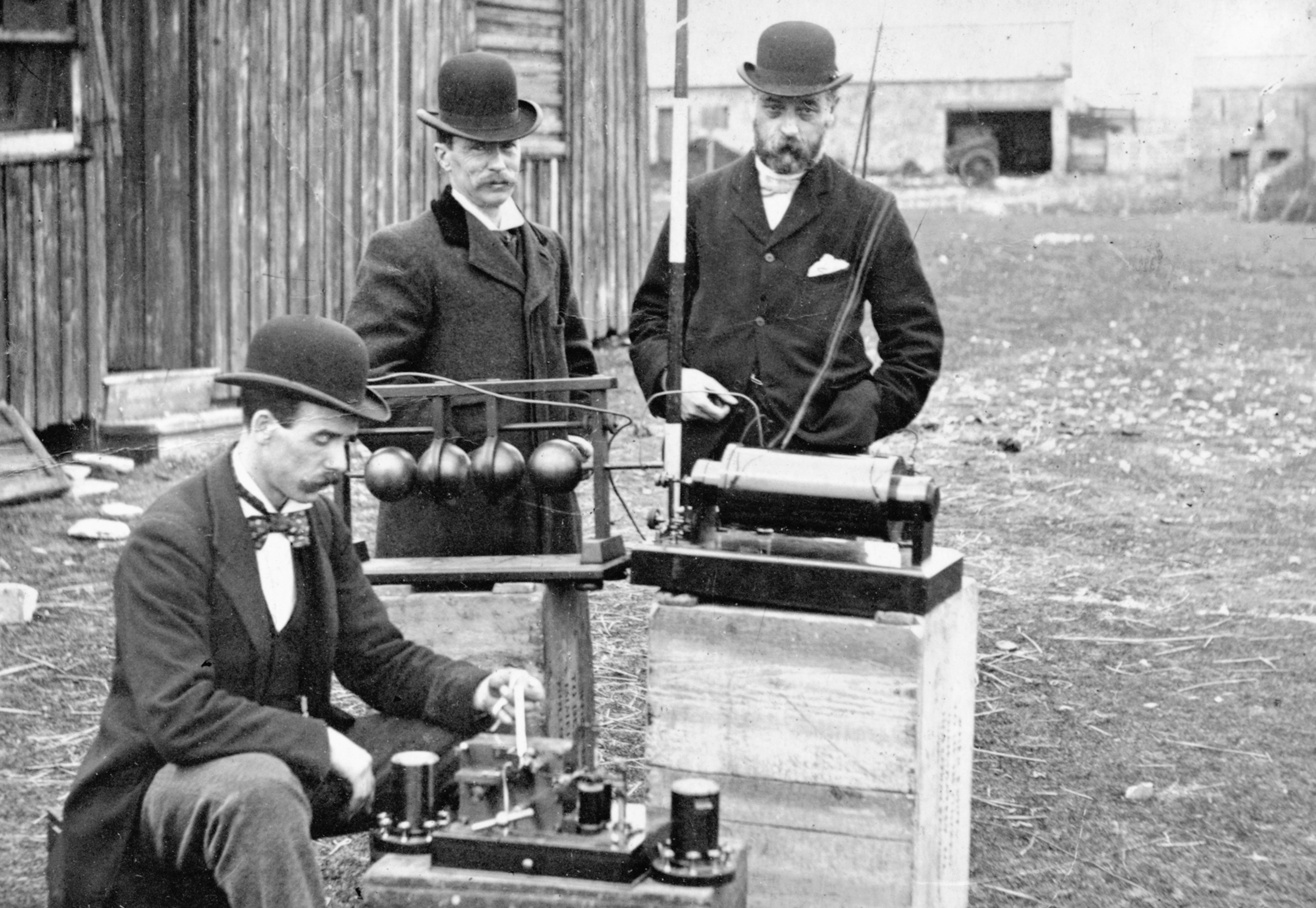
Post Office engineers observing the world's first demonstration of the transmission of radio signals over open sea (Lavernock Point to Flat Holm Island, 13 May 1897) by Marconi.

On 27 July 1896, Guglielmo Marconi gave the first demonstration of wireless telegraphy from the roof of the Telegraph Office in St. Martin's Le Grand.

The development of radio links for sending telegraphs led to the Wireless Telegraphy Act 1904, which granted control of radio waves to the General Post Office, who licensed all senders and receivers. This placed the Post Office in a position of control over radio and television broadcasting as those technologies were developed.

=== An expanded workforce ===
Around fifty women were working as operators for the telegraph companies when they were acquired by the Post Office in 1869; this prompted a change of policy to enable and encourage the recruitment of women to a number of other roles in the organisation (for example, by the end of the following decade half of all counter clerks in London were women). Boys were employed as telegraph messengers from age 14: but, whereas the telegraph companies had routinely promoted boys to the adult grade of telegraph clerk in due course, the GPO merely left them to compete with others for a relatively limited number of jobs; most therefore ended up unemployed and ill-prepared for other work and the GPO was accused of benefitting from child labour. The messenger boys were also vulnerable to child prostitution, working alone on the streets: 'whatever dislike they had for it was entirely and easily overborne by the money which was tendered to them by their seducers', an official noted in 1877; their exploitation came to wide public attention with the uncovering of the Cleveland Street scandal in 1889. Attempts were made to instil discipline among the messenger boys through quasi-military drills and daily exercises, though this did little to protect them. (Note: This daily morning routine of quasi-military training remained in place for the telegraph boys until the early 1920s.) After 1877, the establishment of 'Boy Messenger Institutes' was encouraged with a view to providing educational and other benefits.

The GPO provided a number of benefits for its workers (including, from the 1850s, free medical care and a non-contributory pension scheme), however only so-called 'establishment' workers were included: around 40% of the workforce was deemed to be 'non-establishment', including the telegraph boys, most female employees and the many part-time 'auxiliaries' who filled a variety of roles; all these were paid at a reduced rate with far fewer benefits.

The importance of workers' rights began to be addressed by Henry Fawcett in the 1880s, (Note: Fawcett, as well as being Postmaster General, was Professor of Political Economy at Cambridge and a noted political Radical; his wife Millicent was a leading suffragist.) who established a scheme for improved pay and conditions for telegraphy workers and sorting clerks. During his tenure the first permanent postal workers' union was formed (the Postal Telegraph Clerks' Association) in 1881; others followed, including the United Kingdom Postal Clerks' Association (1887), the Fawcett Association (1890) and the Postmen's Federation (1891). (Note: By the end of the First World War there were sixty-three unions or equivalent bodies representing different types of GPO worker (from the Tube Staff Association to the London Postal Bagmen's Association).) (These aforementioned groups would all come together, in a series of mergers, to form the Union of Post Office Workers in 1919; while other associations, such as the Post Office Engineering Union, continued to maintain their independence.)

== Military links ==
=== Post Office Rifles ===
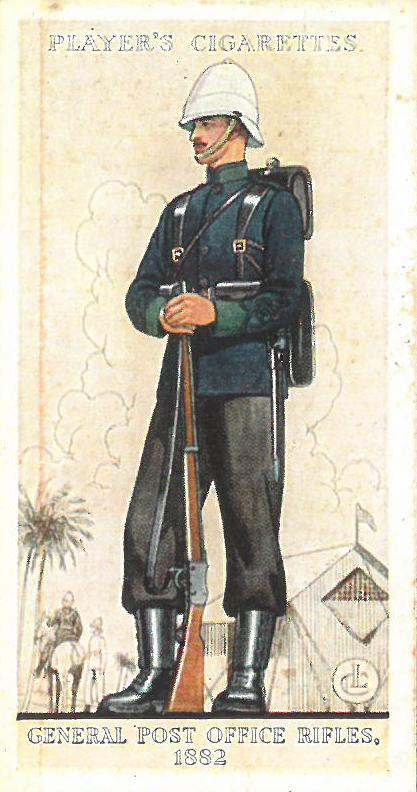
Cigarette card showing a rifleman of the General Post Office Rifles in 1882.

In 1868, as part of the Volunteer Movement, John Lowther du Plat Taylor, Private Secretary to the Postmaster General, raised the 49th Middlesex Rifle Volunteers Corps (Post Office Rifles) from GPO employees, who had been either members of the 21st Middlesex Rifles Volunteer Corps (Civil Service Rifles) or special constables enrolled to combat against Fenian attacks on London in 1867/68. The regiment was restyled 24th Middlesex Rifle Volunteers Corps (Post Office Rifles) in 1880 as part of the Cardwell Reforms.

After the Haldane Reforms the regiment kept its association with the Post Office and continued to recruit postal workers into the Territorial Force under its new title '8th (City of London) Battalion, The London Regiment (Post Office Rifles)' in 1908. It served as an infantry regiment in the First World War (1914–18). Sergeant Alfred Joseph Knight was awarded the Victoria Cross for his bravery in the Capture of Wurst Farm (20 September 1917). The regiment was disbanded in 1921.

==== Specialist companies ====
'M' Company, 24th Middlesex Rifle Volunteers Corps, was formed by royal warrant in 1882 as the Army Post Office Corps (APOC). This newly formed Army Reservist company saw active service providing a postal service to the British military expeditions to Egypt (1882), Suakin (1885) and the Anglo Boer War (1899–1902). The APOC was eventually subsumed by the Royal Engineers in 1913 to re-emerge as the Royal Engineers (Postal Section) Special Reserve. The Postal Section, which recruited heavily from the GPO, provided the Army Postal Service in the First and Second World Wars. (Note: In 1993, what had been the Royal Engineers (Postal Section) became the Postal & Courier Service, Royal Logistic Corps.)

In 1883 the regiment raised 'L' Company as a Telegraph Corps, a year later it was redesignated as the Telegraph Reserve Royal Engineers. Its role was to supplement the Regular Army telegraph units, operated by the Royal Engineers (q.v. below).

=== Royal Engineers telegraph battalion ===
In the second week of December 1869 the War Office declared that 22nd Company Royal Engineers, commanded by Capt. Charles Edmund Webber RE, was to be seconded to the GPO on telegraph duties. The first draft took up their appointments with the GPO in June 1870; Webber as South East District divisional engineer based in New Cross, London, his subalterns as district superintendents of the divisional engineer and the NCOs and sappers as inspectors and linesmen/signallers respectively. They received training at both the School of Military Engineering and the London School of Telegraphy and were for a time billeted at St John's Woods Barracks, London.

The following year the Chatham based 34th Company RE joined 22nd at the GPO. It deployed detachments to GPO offices in Inverness, Ipswich and Bristol. The Company HQ was principally based in Ipswich, but later moved to Bristol. The two companies operated the telegraph services in their respective districts. Exploiting the 'wayleave' agreements, struck for the laying of rail tracks forty years earlier, they further developed the national telegraph network by laying new lines to the more remote parts of the British Isles

In 1884 22nd Company and 34th Company Royal Engineers were amalgamated with 'C' (Telegraph) Troop Royal Engineers (established in 1870 to provide telegraph communications in the field) to form the Telegraph Battalion Royal Engineers (renamed the Royal Engineer Signal Service in 1912), which later became the Royal Corps of Signals. In peacetime, the 1st Division of the new Battalion (formed from the former 'C' Troop) was based in Aldershot and equipped to provide front-line support in the field, whereas the 2nd Division (formed from 22nd Company and 34th Company) was attached to the GPO in London and engaged in installing and operating parts of the national telegraph network; at time of war the two divisions were merged and the battalion as a whole was mobilised (having then the ability both to provide mobile telegraph systems and to make use of existing telegraph infrastructure within the theatre of operations).

== The GPO in the twentieth century ==
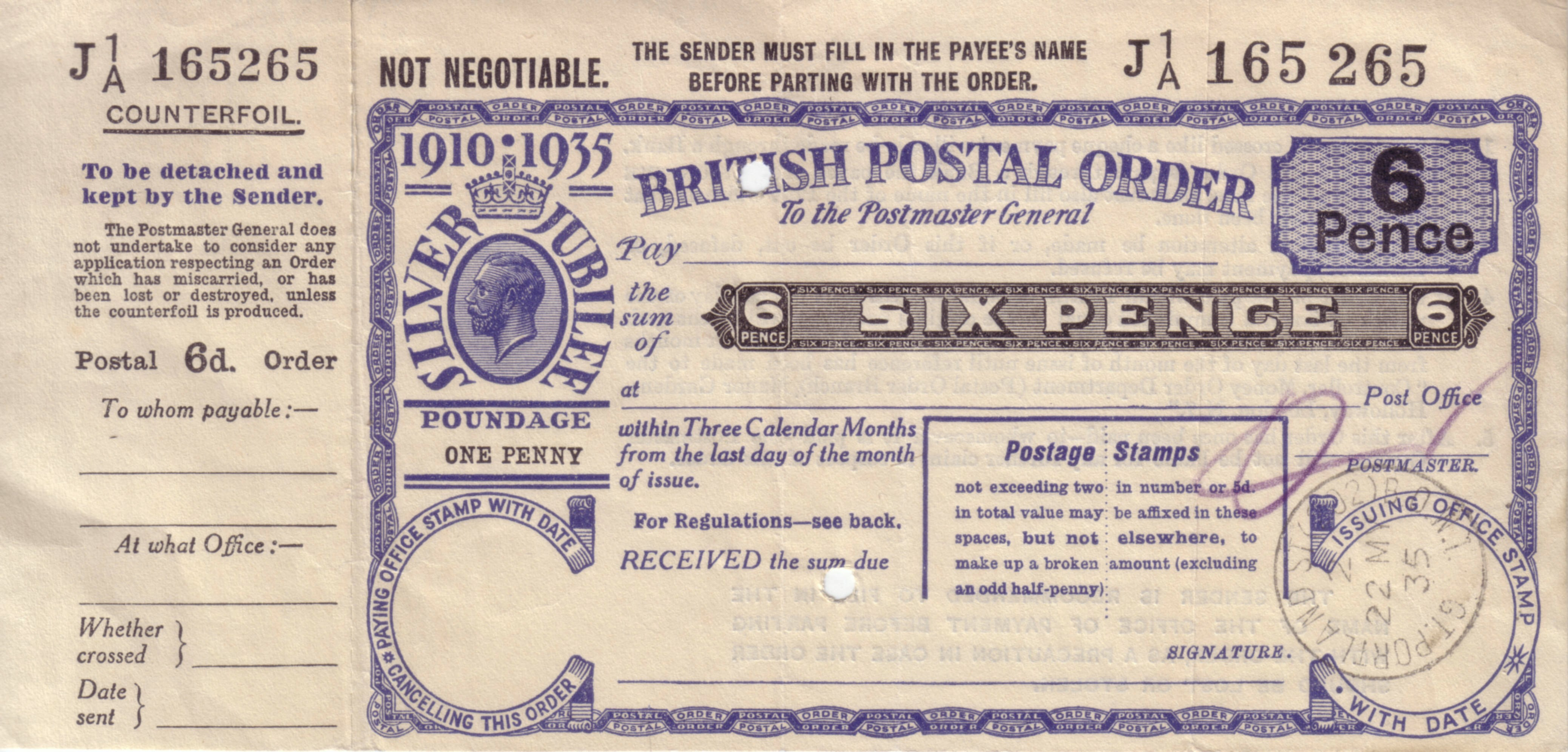
A 6d postal order dating from 1935.

By 1900, house-to-house mail delivery was taking place across England (and was close to being in place in Scotland and Ireland). That year there were nearly 22,000 post offices operating across the United Kingdom: 906 were classified as Head Post Offices (HPOs): these functioned as the head office for their locality and included sorting facilities as well as offering a counter service. Under the HPOs, were a further 255 branch offices (which functioned as additional counters for their associated HPOs). Finally there were 4,964 town sub-post offices and 15,815 country sub-post offices; these were run by sub-postmasters and mistresses, most of whom were self-employed shopkeepers who were paid a commission for their postal work (in contrast to the counter staff of the larger 'Crown' offices, who were GPO employees).

=== The First World War and its aftermath ===
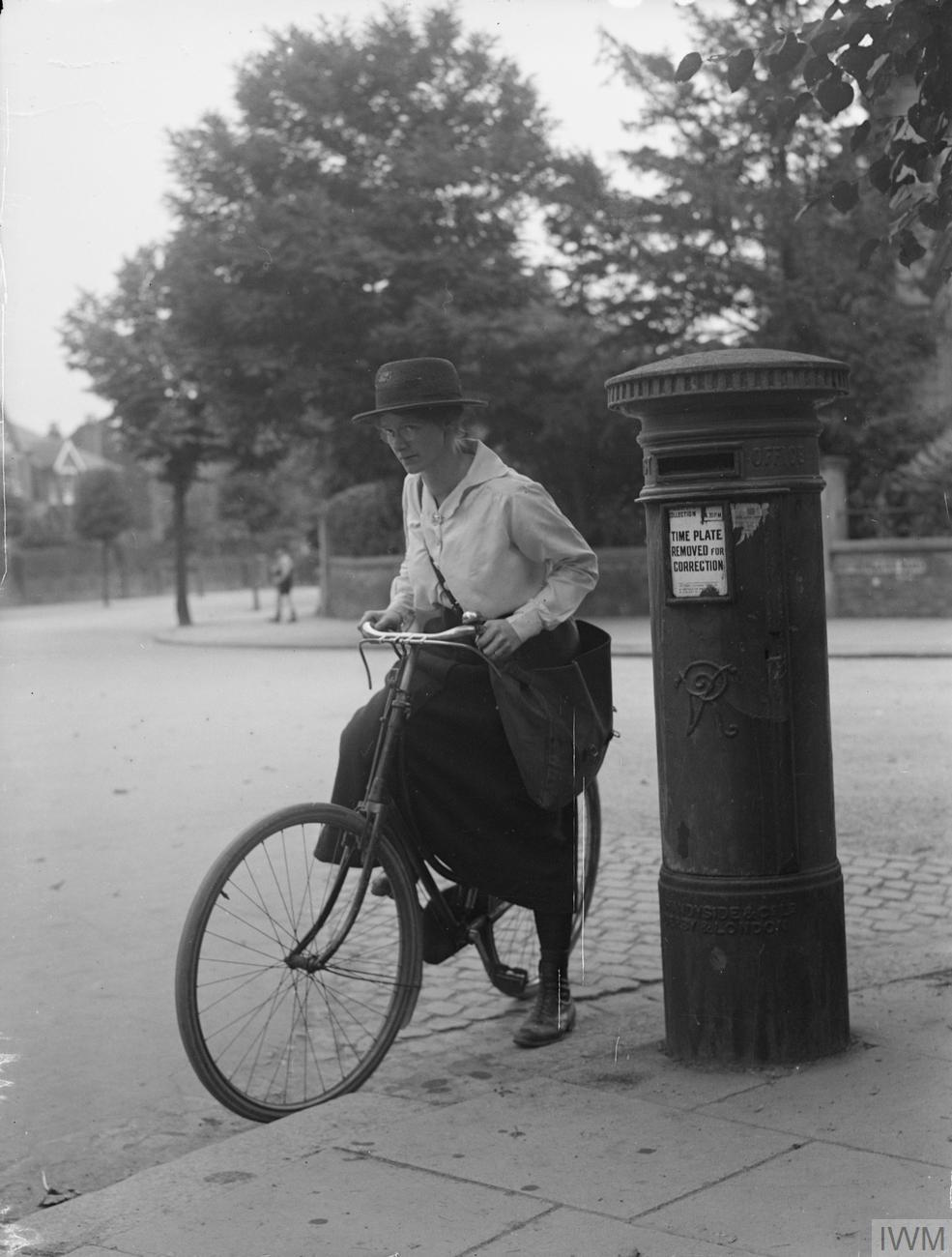
A postwoman at work during the Great War. Bicycles had been issued for use on many postal routes since the turn of the century.

On the eve of the First World War, in 1914, the Post Office is said to have been 'the biggest economic enterprise in Britain and the largest single employer of labour in the world', employing over 250,000 people and with an annual revenue of £32 million. The GPO ran the nation's telegraph and telephone systems, as well as handling some 5.9 billion items of mail each year, while branch post offices offered an increasing number of financial, municipal and other public services alongside those relating to postage. Following the acquisition of the National Telephone Company in 1912 (which employed a significant number of women telephonists), around one quarter of the GPO's workforce was now female.

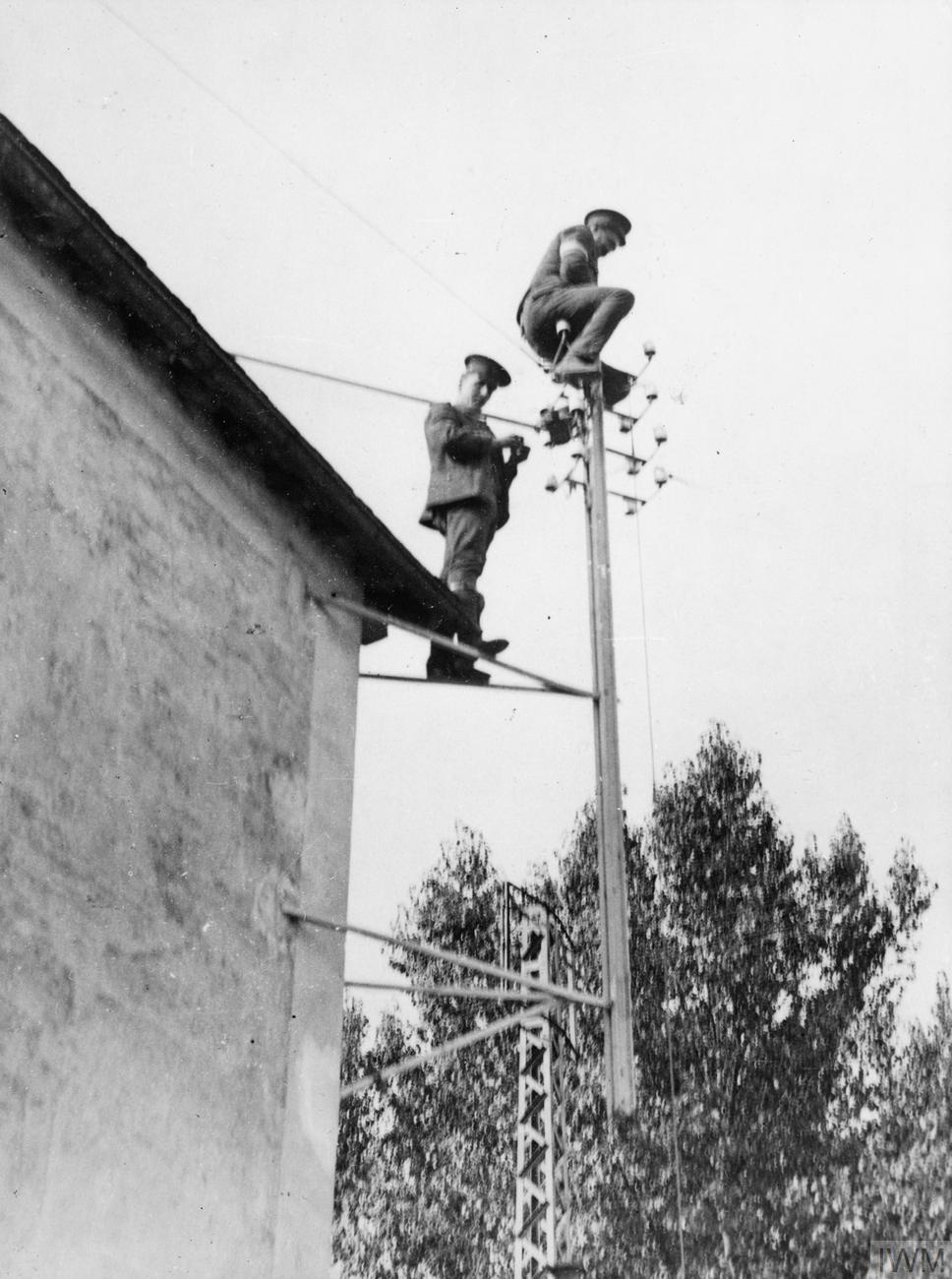
Repairing telegraph wires on the Western Front in 1914.

During the First World War, some 75,000 Post Office men enlisted. The Royal Engineer Postal Section and Signals Section both recruited largely from the GPO, as did the Post Office Rifles (which suffered heavy losses in a series of battles from 1915 onwards). Among other duties, the signals section set up and maintained a network of telephones across the Western Front, while the postal section handled the mail; regular delivery of letters and parcels was seen as vital for morale.

As the war progressed, the GPO was left with hardly any able-bodied male employees between the ages of 18-40 (all of them having either volunteered or been called up for military service). As with other places of work, women were employed for the duration of the war to cover the shortfall; by 1918 they made up around half of the workforce.

At the end of the war, the number of Post Office workers killed in action stood at 8,858. The government put pressure on the Post Office (and other employers) to provide jobs for returning ex-servicemen; most of the temporary staff engaged during the war (including the pioneering wartime postwomen and telegraph girls) were dismissed.

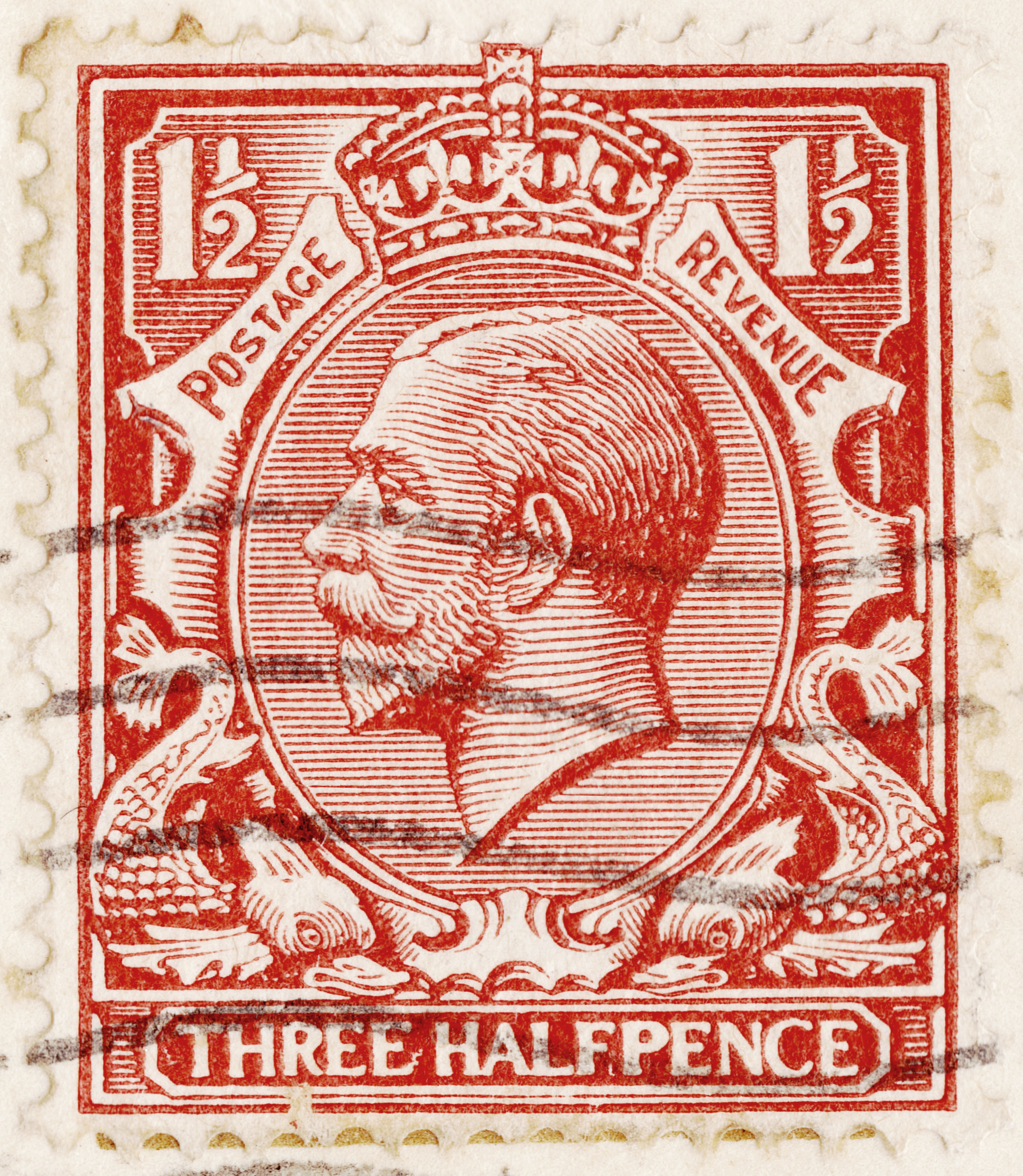
George V 'three halfpence' stamp.

In 1918, the era of the 'penny post' came to an end, as the standard letter rate was raised by one halfpenny to 1½d. (During the war, the penny rate had in any case covered only the lightest letters; while rates for heavier items had fluctuated over many years.) In 1920, the basic rate was again raised, to 2d, in an attempt to cover the GPO's rising wage bill and the cost of the telegraph and telephone businesses, which were running at a deficit; but two years later it was again reduced to 1½d (at which level it remained until 1940).

In the 1920s, motor vehicles began to replace the (previously ubiquitous) horse and cart on short-haul postal routes; and later that decade postal counties would be introduced, to help make the sorting process for deliveries more efficient. The GPO, however, began to face mounting criticism at this time for commercial and technological torpidity (particularly, but not exclusively, in relation to telephones). There were several calls for the Post Office, in whole or in part, to be privatised so as to instil some competitive vigour (including a speech to this effect by Viscount Wolmer, the Assistant Postmaster-General, in 1924). The 1929 Tomlin Commission into the Civil Service also raised serious questions, which (when its final report was published two years later) would have to be addressed by Sir Kingsley Wood, the new Postmaster-General.

=== Ireland ===
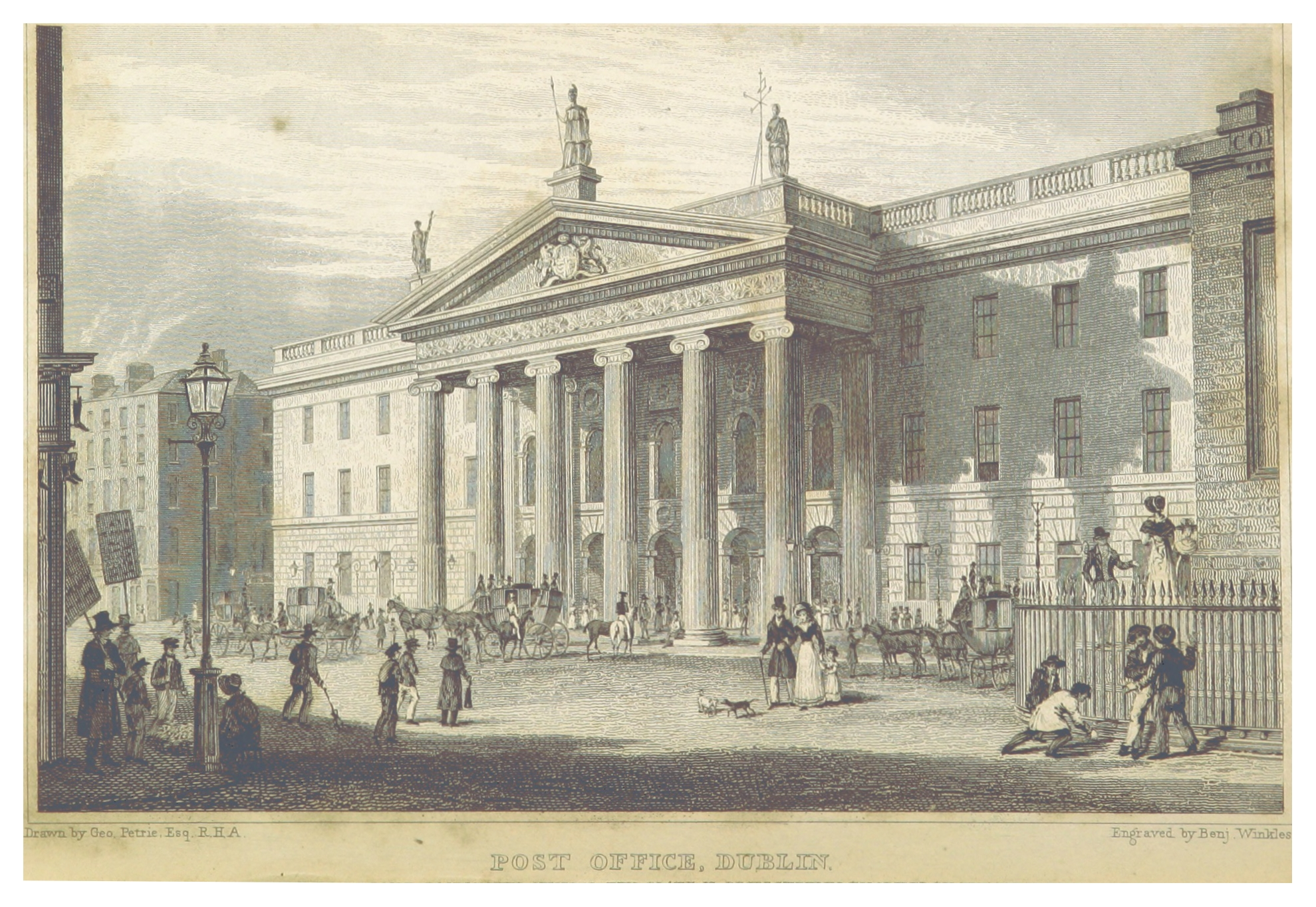
The GPO on Sackville Street, Dublin, in 1837

In 1831, the office of Postmaster General of Ireland had been amalgamated with the equivalent office for Great Britain; for the next 90 years the GPO operated throughout Great Britain and Ireland. In 1916, during World War I, the General Post Office, Dublin was a focus of the Easter Rising, during which the GPO served as the headquarters of the uprising's leaders. It was from outside this building on 24 April 1916, that Patrick Pearse read out the Proclamation of the Irish Republic. (The building was destroyed by fire in the course of the rebellion, save for the granite facade, and not rebuilt until 1929, by the Government of the Irish Free State).

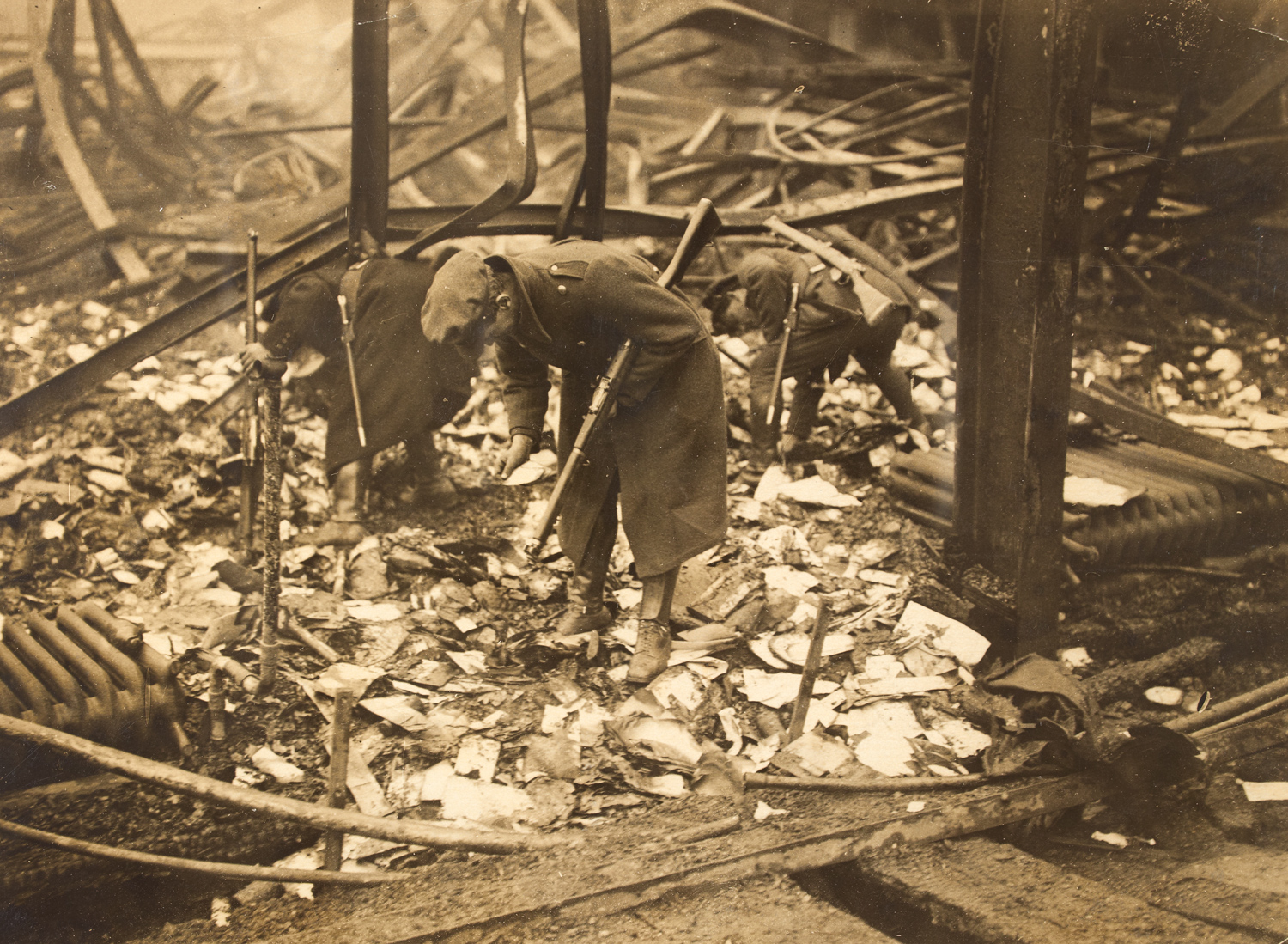
Soldiers of the National Army of the Irish Free State searching through the remains of a fire at the Rotunda Rink, Parnell Square, which was the sorting office of the General Post Office in Dublin (5 November 1922)

Following the Anglo-Irish Treaty of December 1921, responsibility for posts and telegraphs in most of Ireland (but not in Northern Ireland) transferred to the new Provisional Government and then, upon the formal establishment of the Irish Free State in December 1922, to the Free State Government. A Postmaster General was initially appointed by the Free State Government, being replaced by the office of Minister for Posts and Telegraphs in 1924. An early visible manifestation was the repainting of all post boxes in the new Free State in green instead of red. In 1984, the Department of Posts and Telegraphs ('the P. & T.') was replaced by the separate Irish state-owned companies An Post and Telecom Éireann.

=== Control of broadcasting ===
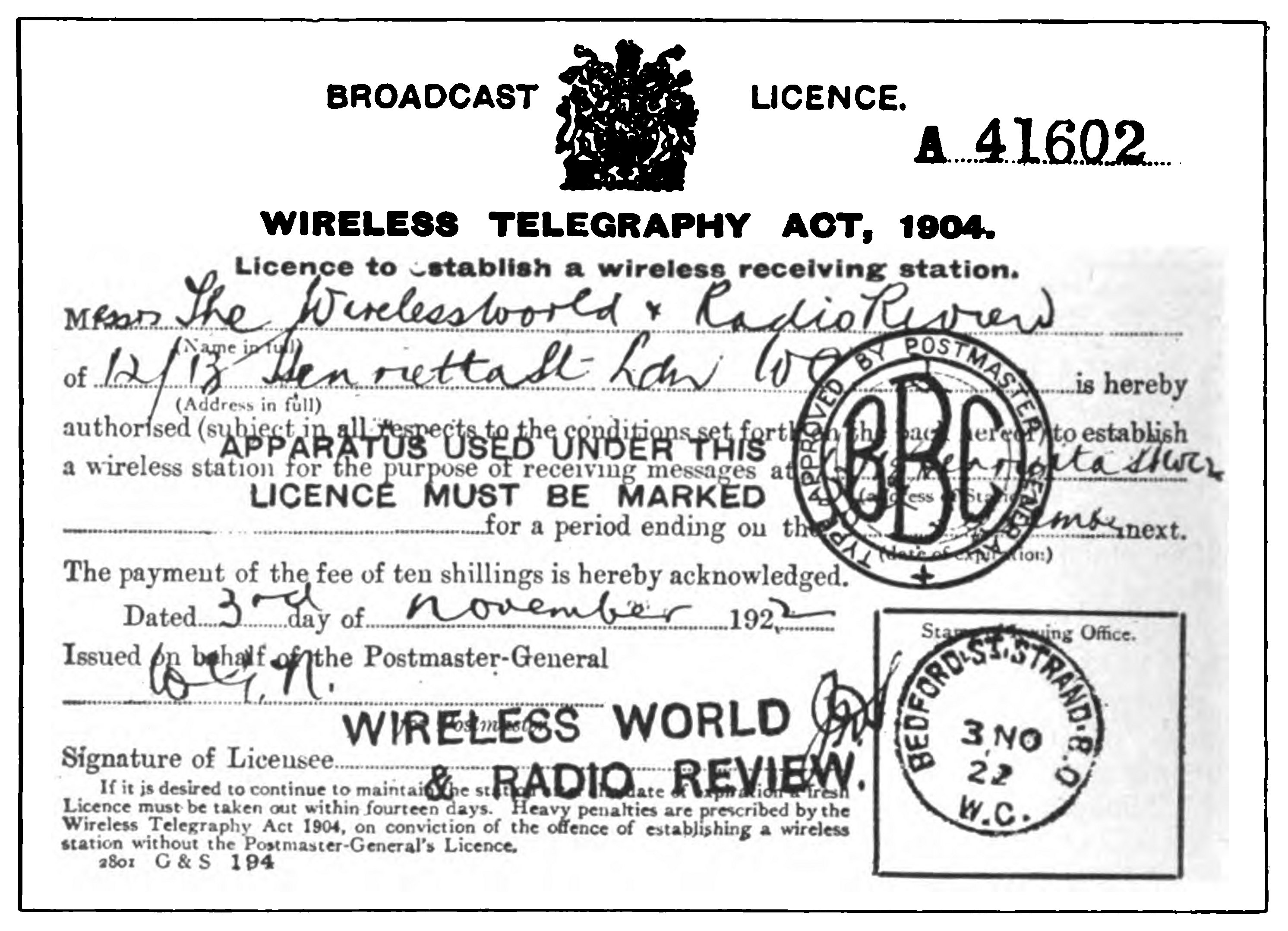
Broadcast Licence 'issued on behalf of the Postmaster-General' in 1922 (permitting the licensee to establish a 'wireless receiving station').

In 1922, a group of radio manufacturers formed the British Broadcasting Company (BBC), which was the sole organisation granted a broadcasting licence by the GPO. In 1927, the original BBC was dissolved and reformed by royal charter as the British Broadcasting Corporation.

From the beginning, the GPO had trouble with competitive pirate radio broadcasters who found ways to deliver electronic messages to British receivers without first obtaining a GPO licence. These competitors were well aware of the fact that the GPO would never grant them such a licence. To police these unlicensed stations, the GPO evolved its own force of detectives and "detector vans".

The radio regulation functions were transferred to the Independent Broadcasting Authority and later Ofcom. Due to its regulatory role, as well as its expertise in developing long-distance communication networks, the GPO was contracted by the BBC, and the ITA in the 1950s and 1960s, to develop and extend their television networks. A network of transmitters was built, connected at first by cable, and later by microwave radio links. The Post Office also took responsibility for the issuing of television licence fees (and radio, until 1971), and the prosecution of evaders until 1991.

=== 20th-century telecommunications ===
==== Telegraphy ====
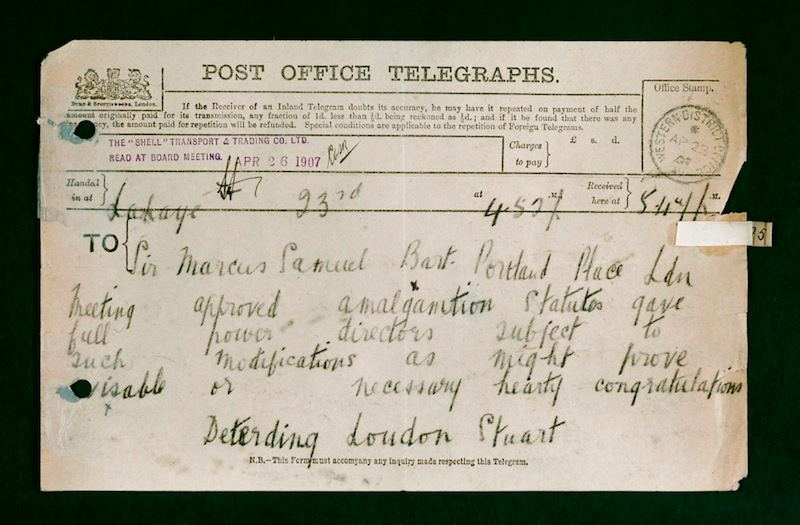
Telegram sent in 1907.

At the start of the twentieth century, a range of systems were in use across the UK and international telegraph networks; the Central Telegraph Office in London employed Morse, Hughes, Wheatstone, Baudot and Murray operators, as around the world different networks used different telegraph codes. Across the UK, the GPO operated more than 14,000 telegraph offices (often co-located with the local post office). The inland telegraph network mostly used Morse sounders or single-needle telegraphs (with Wheatstone ABC machines, which could be operated by untrained staff, being retained in remoter rural locations). As rural telephone exchanges began to be established, however, it became more usual for the less busy offices to convey messages by telephone (at the receiving office the message would be transcribed, before being delivered by a telegram boy in the usual fashion). In large metropolitan areas messages continued to be delivered between district offices using underground networks of pneumatic tubes. In the 1920s Creed teleprinters began to be installed by the GPO in its telegraph offices; having the facility of a typewriter keyboard input and typewritten output (on paper tape or paper), these machines soon began to replace the older devices. A telex service was first introduced in 1932, which enabled direct subscriber-to-subscriber communication by teleprinter.

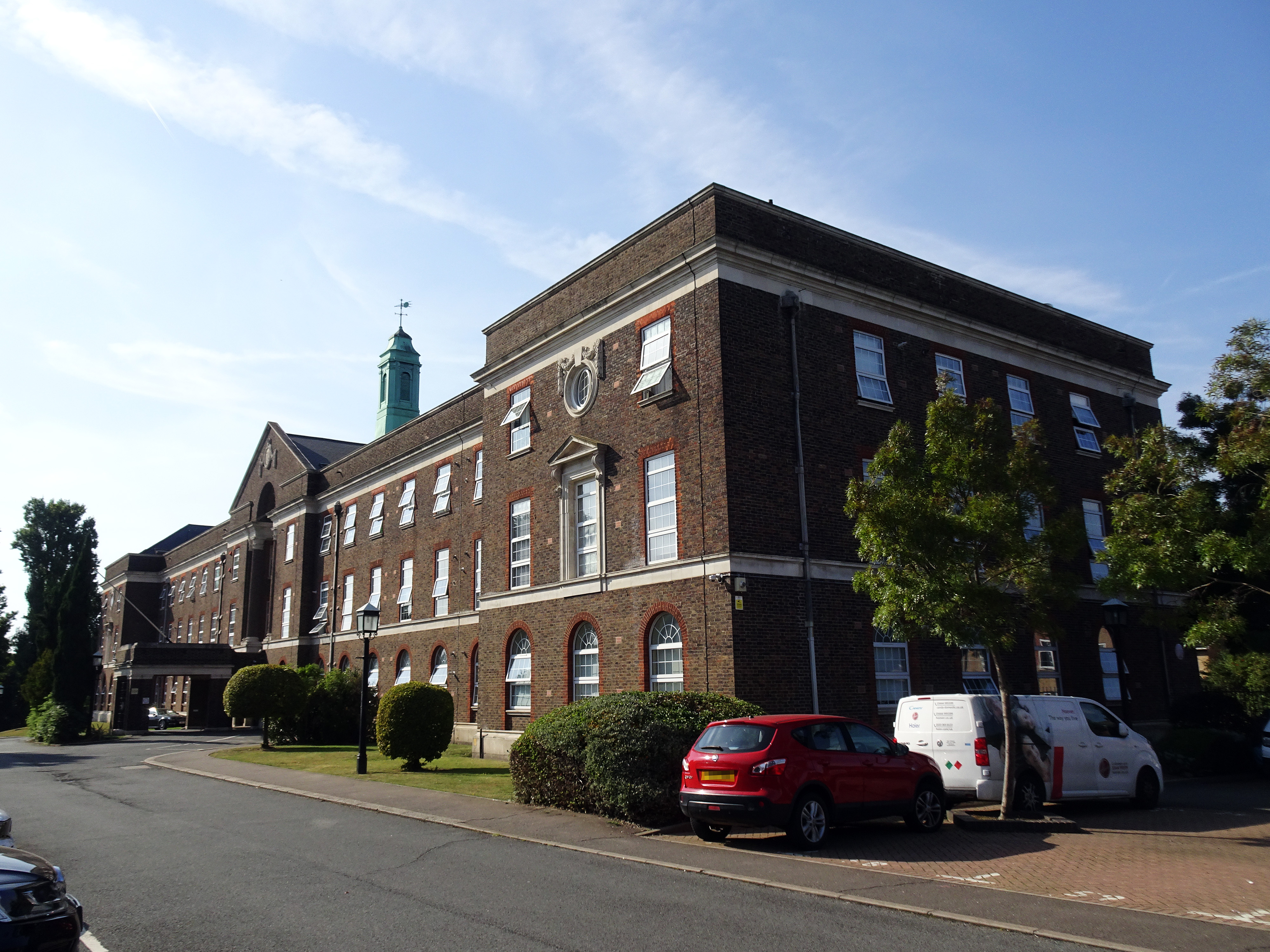
The Post Office Research Station: the world's first electronic computer, 'Colossus', was designed and constructed here by Tommy Flowers and other GPO engineers in 1943.

The year 1909 saw the establishment of the Research Section of the Telegraph Office, which had its origins in innovative areas of work being pursued by staff in the Engineering Department. In the 1920s, a dedicated research station was set up by the GPO seven miles away in Dollis Hill. Through the 1920s, much technical and practical effort was put into improving the speed of transmission and delivery; over a twenty-year period, however, the number of telegrams sent annually dwindled from over 87,000,000 in 1914 to fewer than 50,000,000 in 1934.

The Central Telegraph Office, through which one quarter of the nation's telegraph transmissions passed, was set alight during the London Blitz, destroying much of the interior; it reopened in 1943 but was demolished in the 1960s. (Note: In 1984, the new British Telecom Centre was opened on the site.) In the decades after the Second World War, the volume of telegraph traffic significantly declined; the telegraph network was transferred to British Telecom in 1981, and the following year the inland telegram service was decommissioned.

==== Telephony ====
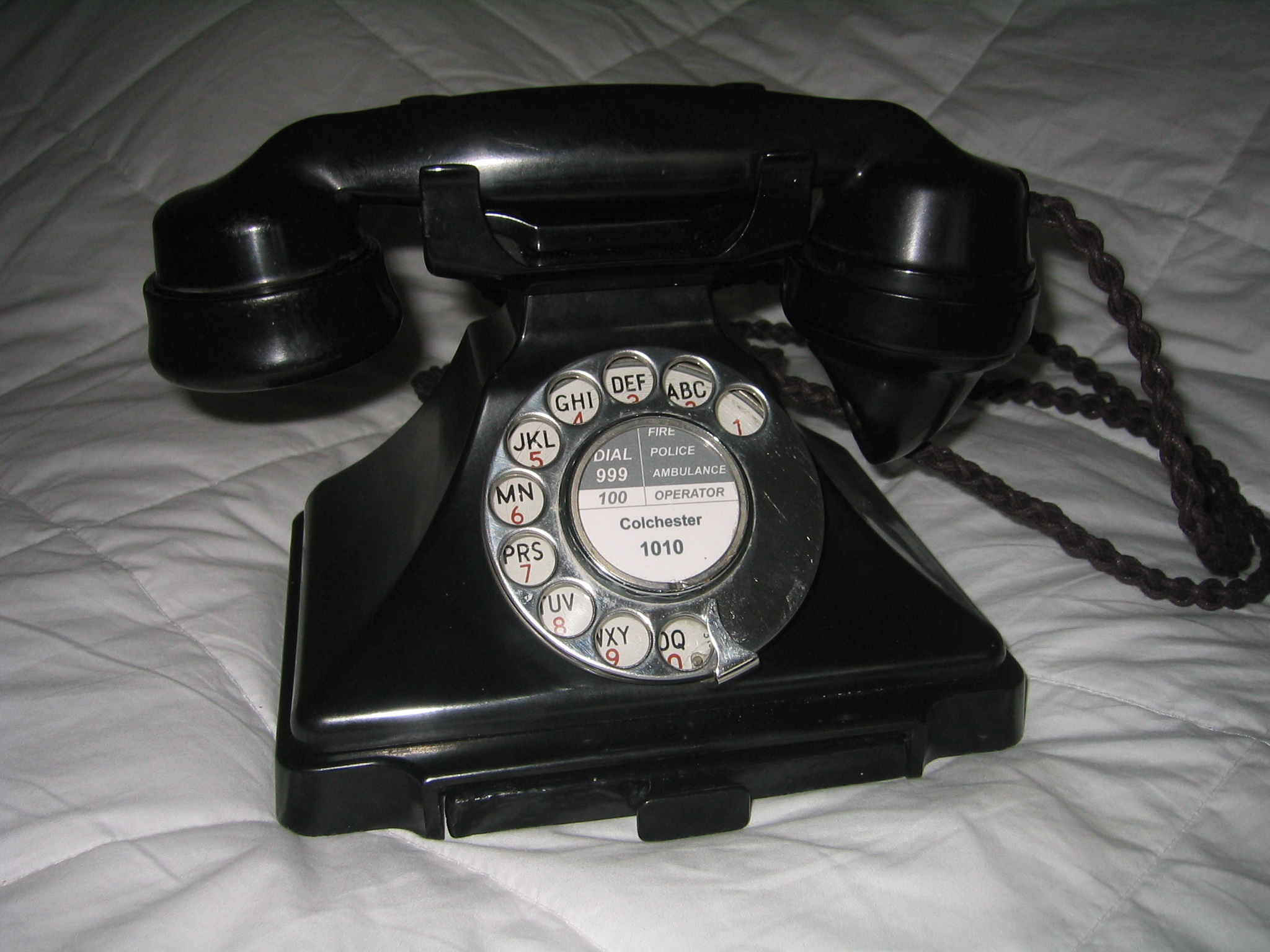
British (BPO) Type 232 phone of 1932

The GPO wished to standardise on the Strowger switch (also called SXS or step-by step) but the basic SXS exchange was not suitable for a large city like London until the Director telephone system was developed by the Automatic Telephone Manufacturing Company in the 1920s. The first London Director exchange, HOLborn, cutover on Saturday 12 November 1927, BIShopgate and SLOane exchanges were to follow in six weeks, followed by WEStern and MONument exchanges. The London area contained 80 exchanges, and full conversion would take many years.

All London customers were given seven-digit numbers, with the first three digits spelling out the (local) exchange name. In March 1966, after all London (and other Director) exchanges were automatic, all-figure dialling was introduced. The Director system enabled the London network to operate with both automatic and manual exchanges in the local network until the 1960s and it was subsequently installed in other large British cities; starting with Manchester (1930), then Birmingham (1931), Glasgow (1937), Liverpool (1941), and Edinburgh (1950).

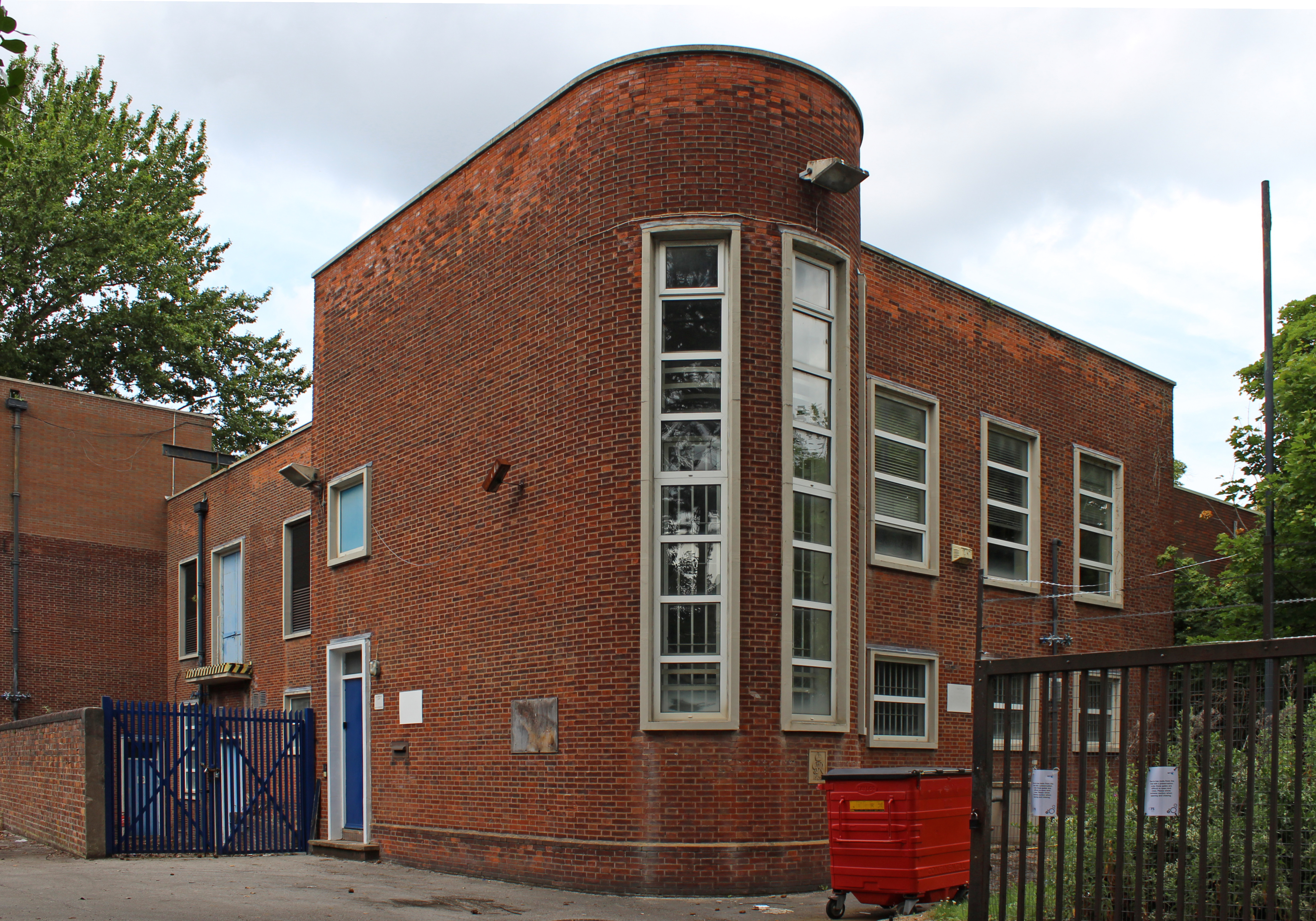
A typical mid-20th century telephone exchange building in Lark Lane, Liverpool.

After the Second World War, there began to be an unprecedented demand for telephone services. In addition, there was the need to make comprehensive repairs, and upgrades to a network which had been severely degraded by war, and lack of investment. Waiting lists for new telephone lines quickly emerged, and persisted for several decades. To alleviate the situation, the Post Office began to provide shared service residential lines, each known as a party line, which could share a cable pair. Most of the line was shared between two subscribers usually splitting off to each within sight of the houses, and both lines attracted a small discount; however, this arrangement had its disadvantages.

At this time, the majority of lines in rural, and regional areas (particularly in Scotland and Wales) were still manually switched. This inhibited growth, and caused bottlenecks in the network, as well as being labour and cost-intensive. The Post Office began to introduce automatic switching, and replaced all of its 6,000 exchanges. Subscriber Trunk Dialling (STD) was also added from 1958, which allowed subscribers to dial their own long-distance calls.

In 1966, a Dial-a-Disc service began,, first in Leeds, dialing the number "16" and a tune would be played, different each day, played from 6pm to 6am and all day on Sunday.

Telecommunications services in the United Kingdom were reorganised as Post Office Telecommunications in October 1969; and then as British Telecom in 1980, although remaining part of the GPO until 1981.

=== 1930s reviews and innovations ===
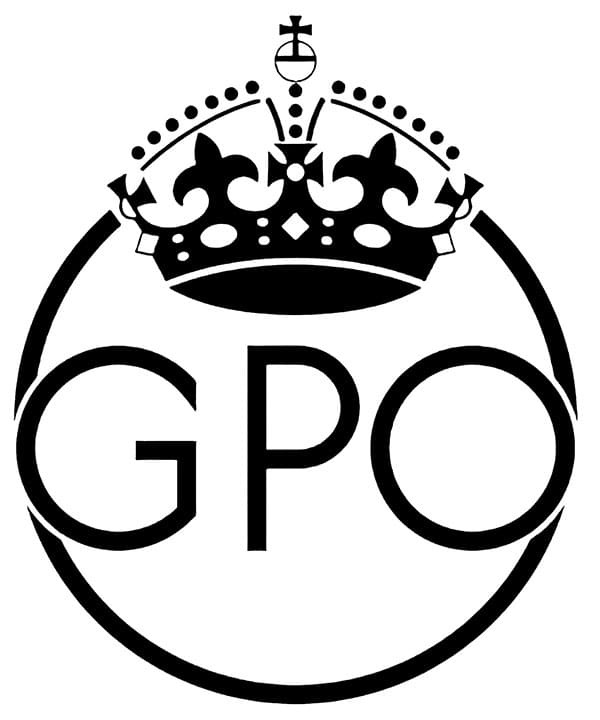
The first GPO logo (1937–1950)

The Bridgeman Committee, chaired by Lord Bridgeman, was set up in 1932 to investigate criticisms of the General Post Office and reported the same year. It highlighted defects in the structure of the organisation and recommended the creation of a new Board (chaired by the Postmaster-General) to replace the Secretariat, and a new official: the Director-General, who would serve as vice-chair 'with the duty of ensuring that board decisions were made effective and that continuity and unity of policy were maintained'. The Gardiner Committee, chaired by Sir Thomas Gardiner, was set up to investigate improvements in efficiency and reported in 1936. The report recommended the setting up of eight provincial regions outside London, (Note: Home Counties; Midland; Northern Ireland; North-Eastern; North-Western; Wales and Border Counties; Scotland; South-Western) and the introduction of the London Postal Region and London Telecommunications Region for the capital and surrounding area. Various executive responsibilities were to be devolved from the centre to the new regions, and the district Surveyors (the provincial eyes and ears of St Martin's Le Grand) were to be abolished. The changes were implemented between 1936-40.

The Motor Transport branch was established in 1932; previously provision of motor vehicles had been contracted out, but henceforward the GPO would maintain its own fleet, the mainstays of which were, initially, Morris Minor vans (built to the Post Office's own specification) and BSA motorcycles (which were used by the older telegraph boys). A pair of Transorma machines were installed in Brighton HPO in 1935, but beyond this trial installation; no practical progress would be made on mechanised mail sorting until the 1960s.

=== GPO Film Unit and Poster Advisory Group ===
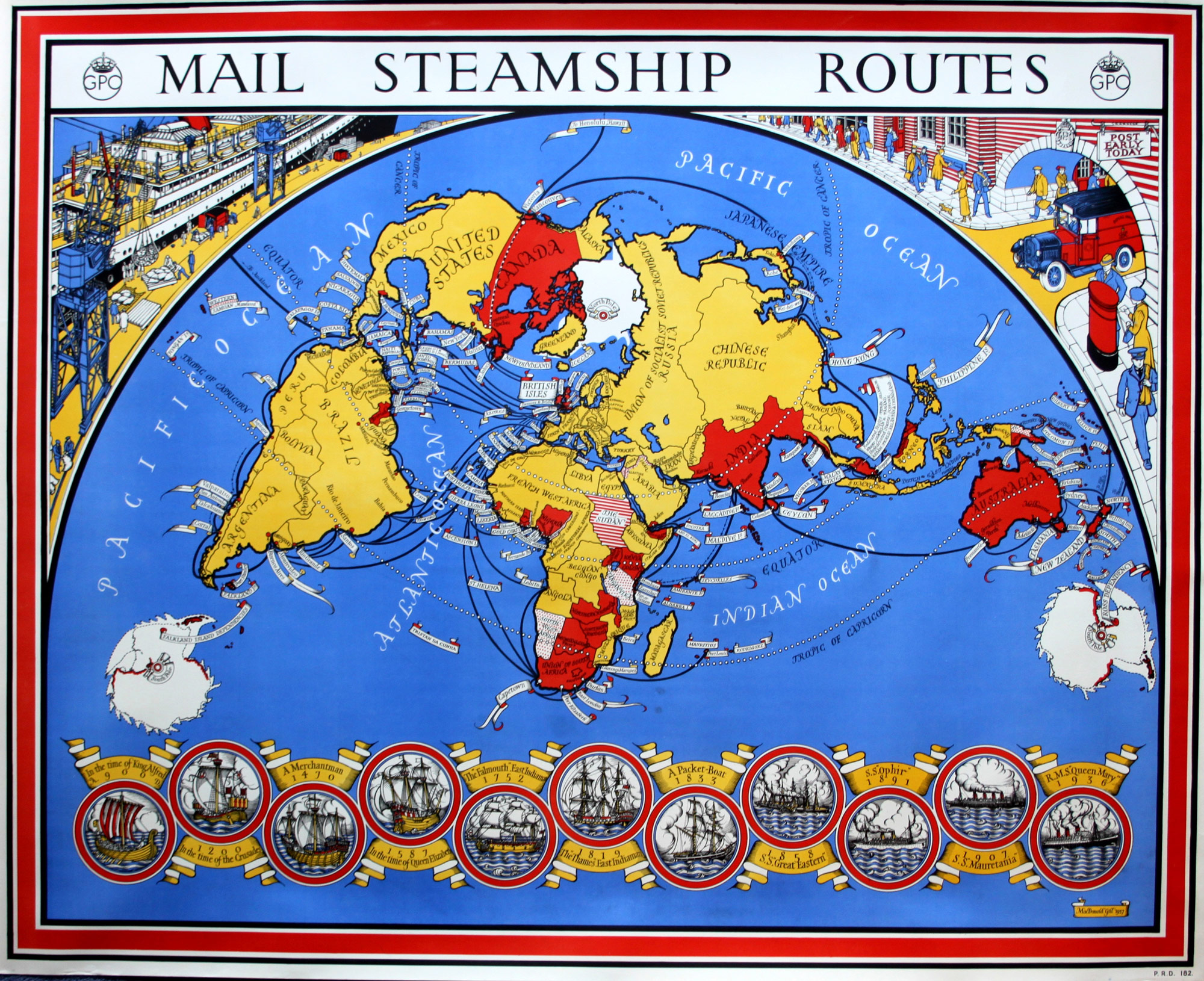
1937 International steamship network GPO by MacDonald Gill

In 1933, Sir Stephen Tallents was appointed to head up a new public relations department. Among other things, he established the influential GPO Film Unit, while his acumen in the field of graphic design led to the Post Office becoming a leader and trend setter in its use of posters for the purposes of marketing, information and publicity. In 1934 a Poster Advisory Group was established at the GPO. Tallents was the chair, and its members included Kenneth Clark, Clive Bell, John Grierson and Jack Beddington. This was a committee established to advise on a series of new posters designed to promote post office services and update the GPO's corporate image. Leading artists and graphic designers were commissioned to produce a range of modern art posters. (The artists included: MacDonald Gill, John Armstrong, Clifford Ellis, Rosemary Ellis, E. McKnight Kauffer, Edward Bawden, Duncan Grant, Stanley Spencer and Eric Fraser.) These were distributed to post offices and schools throughout the United Kingdom. The high artistic quality of these posters and their wide distribution has been credited with helping to foster a greater appreciation of abstract designs and modern art in Britain. However in 1937, after only 3 years the PAG was liquidated due to conflict between the GPO staff, in particular E.T. Crutchley who had replaced Tallents, and the rest of the Group.

=== Airmail ===
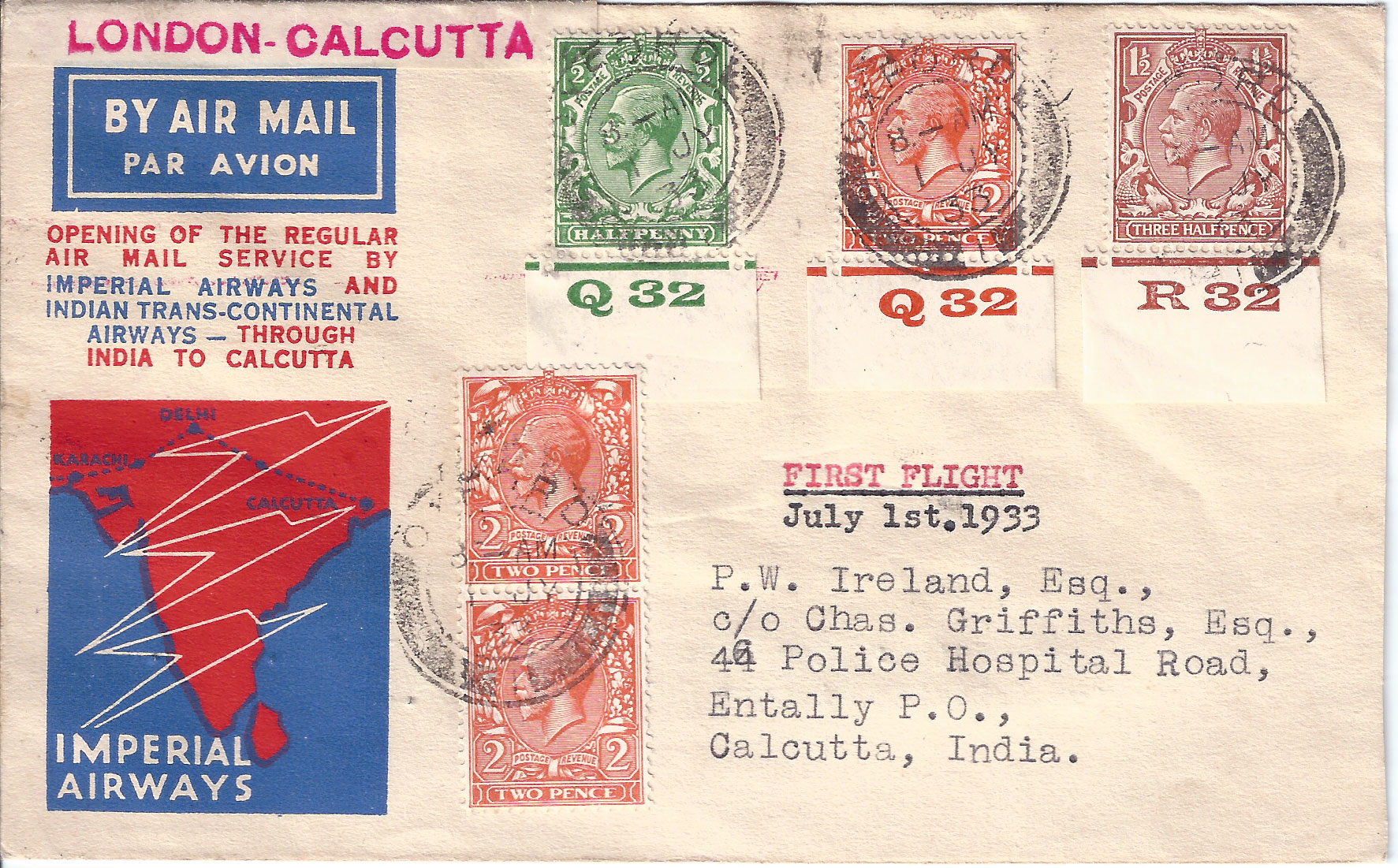
Prior to 1937, sending a letter by airmail entailed paying surcharges (in addition to the standard imperial letter rate of 1½ d or foreign rate of 2½ d).

The first domestic scheduled airmail service was provided in 1911 to coincide with the Coronation; the first international service was provided by the RAF for British troops stationed in Germany in December 1918, and the first transatlantic airmail delivery took place the following year, courtesy of Alcock and Brown. The number of airmail flights on offer had multiplied during the 1920s, with government-supported long-haul services provided initially by the RAF and then by Imperial Airways; but the GPO's role in these enterprises was minimal (beyond providing blue air mail labels at counters, charging the requisite surcharge and directing labelled mail to Croydon Aerodrome).

In 1935, however, the Postmaster-General (under pressure from the UK Government) sanctioned an official Empire Air Mail Scheme, by which a half-ounce letter could be sent anywhere in the Empire for a flat rate of three-halfpence (1½ d); (Note: The cost was the same as for letters sent by sea, except that the sea rate allowed letters weighing up to an ounce.) the scheme was rolled out in stages from 1937-38. Whilst immediately successful, it proved costly both to Imperial Airways (who had drastically underestimated the volume of cargo it would have to carry) (Note: Between 1935-36 and 1938-39, the number of letters sent annually by airmail increased from 10.8 million to 91.2 million.) and the Post Office (who had agreed to subsidise the company through tonnage payments). The scheme was wound up with the outbreak of war in 1939.

=== The Second World War and its aftermath ===
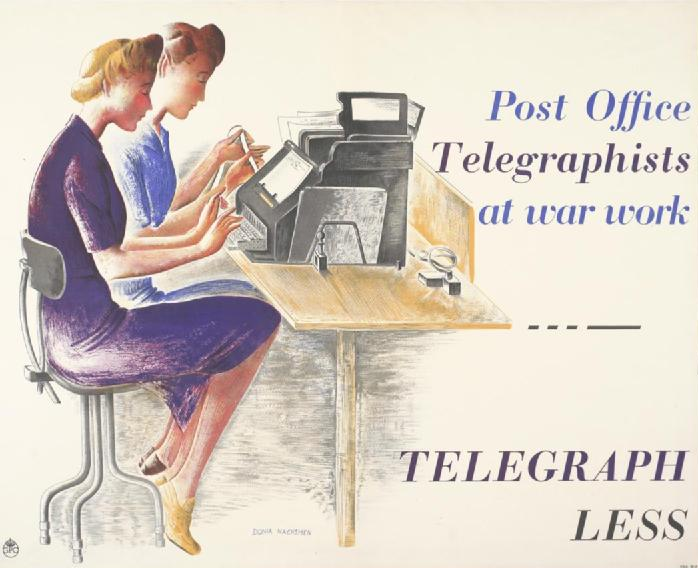
The public were encouraged to minimise their use of telegraphs and telephones during the Second World War.

During the war, a generation of engineers trained by the GPO for its telecommunications operations were to have important roles in the British development of radar and in code breaking. The Colossus computers used by Bletchley Park were designed and built by GPO engineer Tommy Flowers and his team at the Post Office Research Station in Dollis Hill.

As in the previous war, GPO employees joined up in significant numbers (over 78,000 enlisted in total, equivalent to one quarter of the workforce); over the course of the war 3,800 of them were killed on active service (in addition to whom around 400 civilian GPO workers were killed as a result of enemy action).

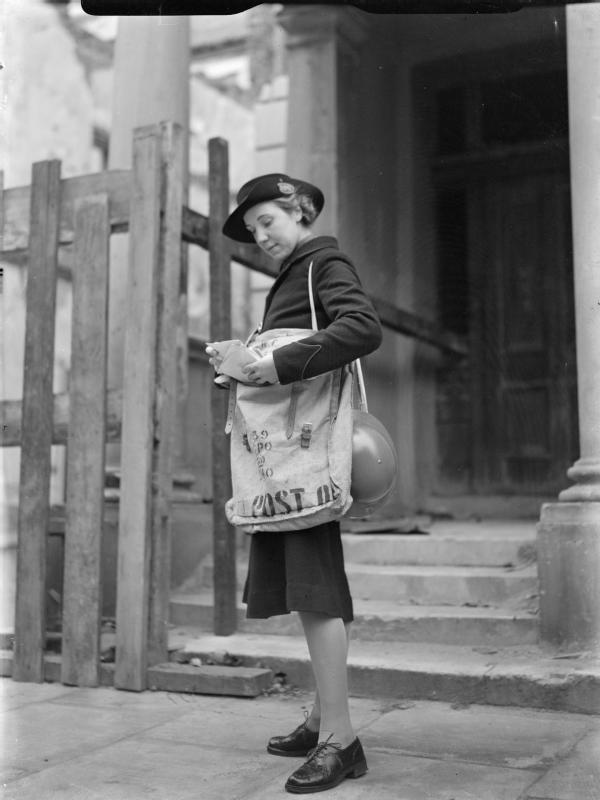
A postwoman at work in Blitz-damaged London, October 1941.

GPO infrastructure, from telephone lines to sorting offices, suffered significant damage during the Blitz: in London alone seven of the ten District Head Offices were hit (some on several occasions) and 234 individual post offices suffered damage; the Central Telegraph Office likewise suffered direct hits (on two separate occasions) as did the UK's largest telephone exchange in nearby Wood Street. Similar scenes were played out elsewhere across he UK; but contingency plans had been made since the mid-1930s, including the strategic provision of duplicate key facilities (either underground or in remote locations). Aided by the courage and determination of numerous GPO workers, the country's communication networks were remarkably well sustained.

Airmail deliveries were resumed by the RAF in 1941, courtesy of the airgraph, which (as flights began to proliferate) was superseded by the pre-stamped air letter. The Army Post Office co-ordinated deliveries to and from Army and RAF personnel stationed overseas (as well as to and from prisoners of war), (Note: albeit the Japanese authorities declined to deliver any letters to the prisoners they held.) while the GPO took care of deliveries to the majority of those stationed at home, as well as co-ordinating with the Admiralty to provide deliveries to and from naval vessels whenever possible. Prior to D-Day, the Army Post Office was made privy to the invasion plans, so as to be able to plan for the provision of field post offices in the right locations; the first consignment of letters for British troops arrived two days later, on 8 June.

After the end of the war, it took some time for infrastructure to be restored and services to be returned to their peacetime footings. It took four years for telephone connections to continental Europe to be re-established, and civil airmail services were not restarted until 1948-49.

==== The last decade ====
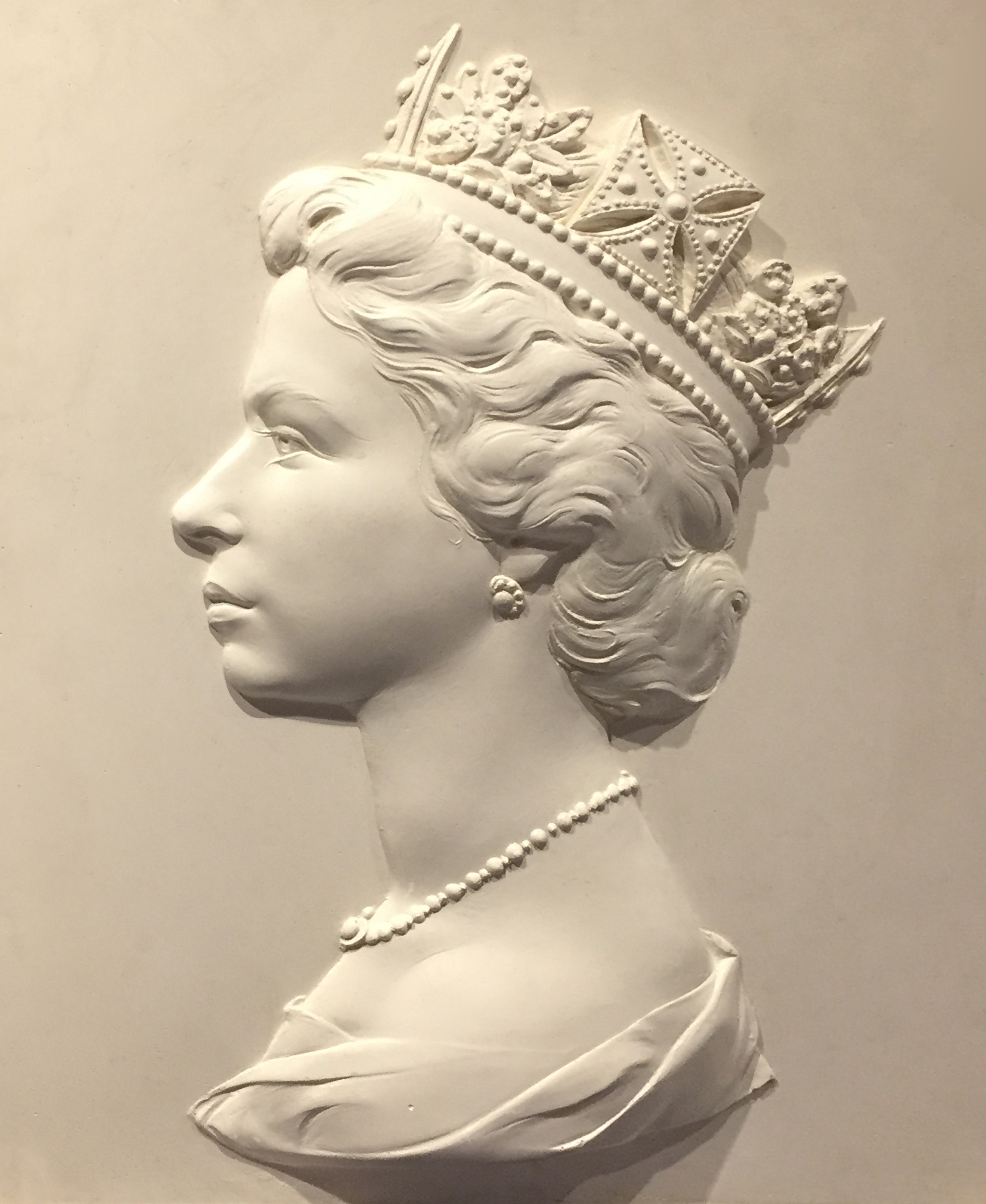
Arnold Machin's plaster bas-relief of Elizabeth II, as used on UK definitive stamps from 1967-2022.

The implementation of a national system of post codes began with Norwich in 1959, where a pair of automatic sorting machines were installed in 1966; the system and its associated hardware were gradually extended across the UK over the course of the next twenty years.

Tony Benn arrived as Postmaster General in October 1964, and promptly abolished the traditional red coats and top hats of the Post Office Headquarters doormen. (He also began a co-ordinated, and ultimately fruitless, campaign to remove the Queen's head from UK stamps). By December 1964, he was persuaded of the need to change the status of the Post Office from a government department to public corporation (a proposition which was broadly supported by senior officials, but opposed by the trade unions). He also advocated splitting and diversifying the business, a position which was less widely supported within the organisation. His term of office as PMG ended in July 1966; less than a month later it was announced in Parliament that the Post Office would indeed become a statutory corporation.

=== Dissolution ===
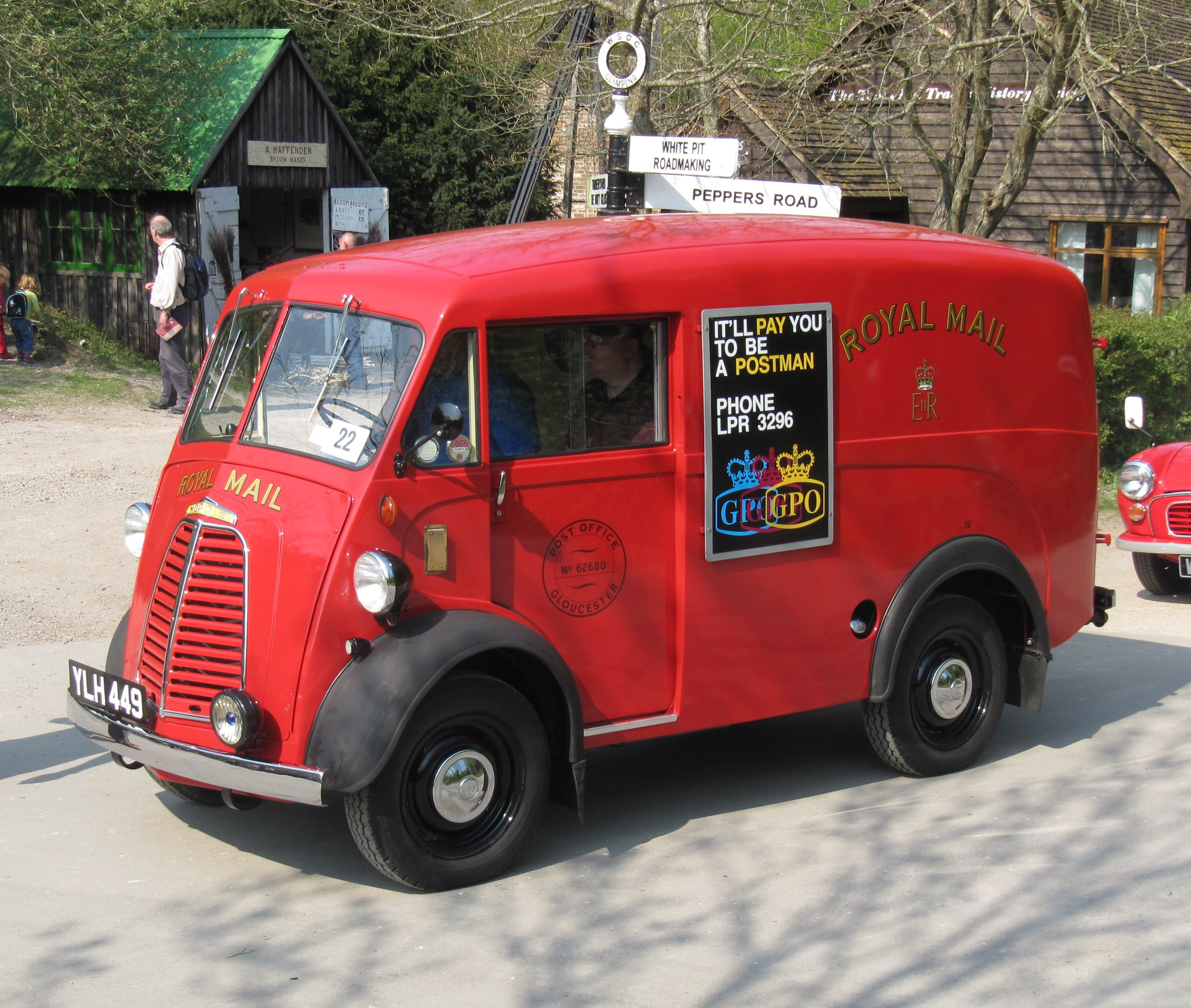
A 1960s vintage Royal Mail post van. A roundel painted on the nearside door indicated each such vehicle's fleet number and district.

Under the Post Office Act 1969, the assets of the GPO were transferred from a government department with a royal charter to a statutory corporation named the Post Office (the word 'General' being dropped from the name). Responsibility for telecommunications was given to Post Office Telecommunications, the successor of the GPO Telegraph and Telephones department, with its own separate budget and management.

Jersey Post and Guernsey Post became independent in 1969, followed by Guernsey and Jersey Telecom in 1973. Isle of Man Post also commenced operation on 5 July 1973.

In 1969, the Post Office Savings Bank was transferred to the Treasury, and renamed the National Savings Bank.

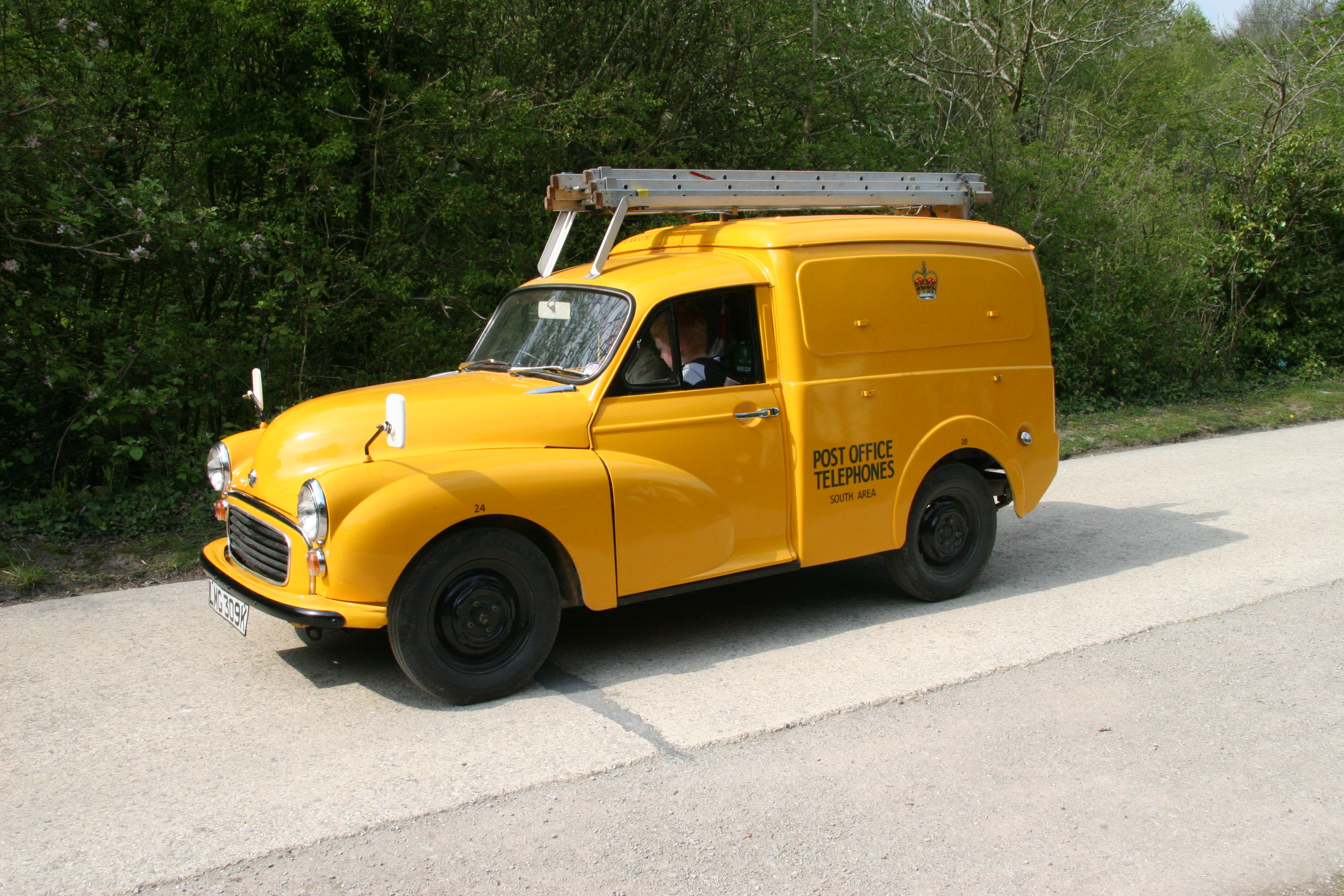
A 1970s vintage Post Office Telephones van. The GPO introduced this 'golden yellow' livery (for safety) in 1968; earlier GPO Telephones vans had been painted bronze-green.

The British Telecommunications Act 1981 split off the telecommunications business to form the British Telecommunications corporation, leaving the Post Office corporation with the Royal Mail, parcels, Post Office Counters and National Giro businesses. British Telecommunications was converted to British Telecommunications plc in 1984, and was privatised. Girobank was divested to Alliance & Leicester in 1990.

As part of the Postal Services Act 2000, the businesses of the Post Office were transferred in 2001 to a public limited company, Consignia plc, which was quickly renamed Royal Mail Holdings plc. The UK Government became the sole shareholder in Royal Mail Holdings plc and its subsidiary Post Office Ltd.

Finally, on 5 April 2007, the UK Government published The Dissolution of the Post Office Order 2007 under which the old Post Office statutory corporation was formally abolished, with effect from 1 May 2007.

== Post Office Headquarters ==
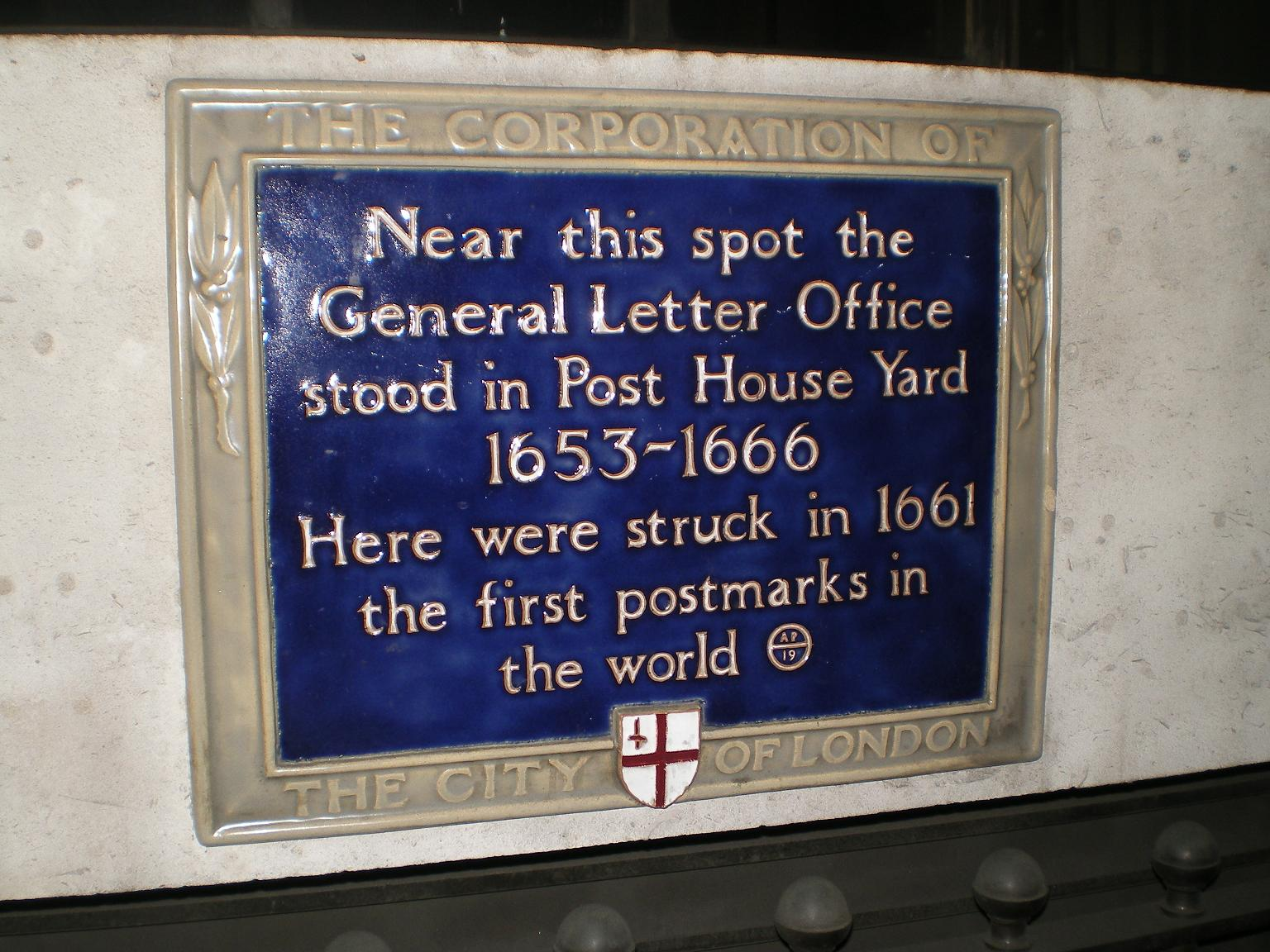
Blue plaque by Threadneedle Street, marking the former site of the General Letter Office.

The head office of the General Post Office was firmly established in the City of London by 1653, in a sizeable building at the lower end of Threadneedle Street (by the junction with Poultry, Cornhill and Lombard Street). Prior to this date there is evidence of the posts having been administered at various times either from the house of the chief postmaster or from one of the City's post houses. The office in Threadneedle Street was destroyed in the Great Fire of London, after which various temporary locations were used up until 1678, when a new office was established in Lombard Street. The General Post Office remained there for the next 150 years.

=== St Martin's Le Grand ===
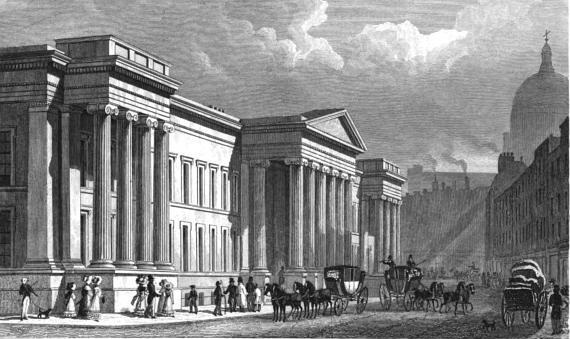
The 19th-century headquarters of the General Post Office in St Martins-le-Grand in the City of London

Having outgrown its premises in Lombard Street, the General Post Office purchased slums on the east side of St. Martin's Le Grand and cleared them to establish a new headquarters, Britain's first purpose-built mail facility. The new General Post Office building, designed with Grecian ionic porticoes by Sir Robert Smirke, was built between 1825 and 1829, ran 400 feet (120 m) long and 80 feet (24 m) deep, and was lit with a thousand gas burners at night. Afterwards 'St. Martin's Le Grand' began to be used as a metonym for the General Post Office (a usage which continued well into the 20th century).

In the 1840s there were, in addition to the chief office at St. Martin's Le Grand, four branch offices in London: one in the City at Lombard Street (in part of the old headquarters building); two in the West End at Charing Cross and Old Cavendish Street near Oxford Street; and one south of the Thames in Borough High Street.

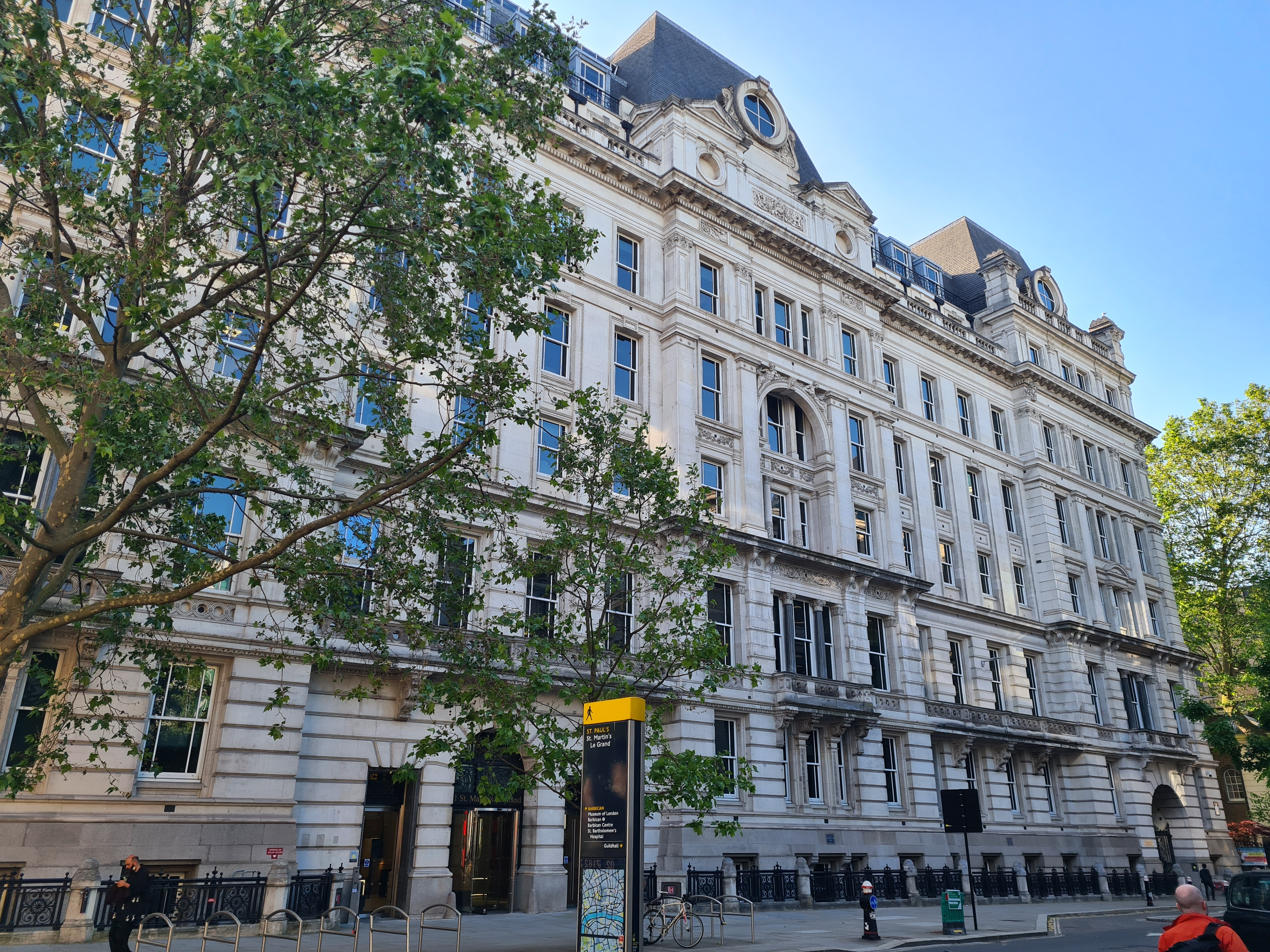
GPO North at 1 St Martin's Le Grand: Post Office Headquarters from 1895-1984.

In 1874, a new headquarters building ('GPO West') was opened on the western side of the street, containing a suite of public rooms and offices for the Postmaster General, the senior officials and all their administrative staff. This left Smirke's building ('GPO East') to function mainly as a sorting office. The upper floors of the new building housed the GPO's newly-acquired telegraph department; but as this fast expanded, more space was needed and in the 1890s a separate new headquarters building was opened ('GPO North'), immediately to the north of the telegraph building. This remained the headquarters of the GPO, and then of the Post Office, until 1984,

In the early 20th century various different departments of the General Post Office (most of which had begun their days in St Martin's Le Grand) were provided with their own headquarters in different parts of London: the Post Office Savings Bank was in Blythe House, West Kensington; the Postal and Money Order office in Manor Gardens, off Holloway Road; the Stores Department was in Studd Street, Islington and the Telephone Department in Queen Victoria Street (in what became the Faraday Building). In 1910 the King Edward Building was opened on King Edward Street (immediately to the west of GPO North) to serve as the new 'London Chief Office' in place of Smirke's GPO East; the latter was then demolished two years later.

=== Links to the intelligence services ===
The practice of intercepting letters for intelligence purposes was well-established by the Commonwealth period, and it continued after the Restoration. At the time of the Rump Parliament, Isaac Dorislaus had set up a secret room in the General Letter Office, adjacent to the Foreign Office, (Note: The establishment of the GPO's 'Foreign Office' predated that of its namesake in Whitehall by more than a century.) where letters were intercepted, opened and read late at night. He was assisted by Samuel Morland, who in the 1660s invented an intelligence machine which could produce facsimiles of intercepted letters.

In the early 18th century the authority of Ministers of the Crown to open and read letters for reasons of public safety had been clearly established by statute, drawn up by Lord Somers. Warrants were frequently applied for in the 18th-century, sometimes on trivial premises, and by the 1730s a permanent office had been established within the General Letter Office, in which a number of cryptanalysts were employed (as 'His Majesty's Post-Office decipherers'), among them the Revd Dr Edward Willes.

In 1844 it was revealed in the House of Commons, in response to an enquiry by Thomas Slingsby Duncombe, that the Home Office had issued a warrant for the Post Office to intercept and investigate correspondence pertaining to Giuseppe Mazzini. The Home Secretary, Sir James Graham, admitted the interception but did not divulge the reason for it. Duncombe contended that warrants for intercepting mail were being issued at the request of foreign governments, in a way that was both unconstitutional and unlawful. The accusations prompted widespread expressions of disapproval and further questions in Parliament. In response to public disquiet, a select committee was set up 'to inquire into a department of Her Majesty's Post-Office commonly called "the secret or inner office", the duties and employment of the persons engaged therein, and the authority under which the functions of the said office were discharged'.

The Mazzini affair left the Post Office wary of involvement in espionage, and legislation was put in place to prevent letters from being opened without a warrant. In 1910, however, the Home Secretary (Winston Churchill) issued a 'general warrant' allowing the Secret Service Bureau to intercept letters at will; in the run-up to the First World War individuals who had been placed under surveillance routinely had their mail monitored. During the Second World War, and for some years after, a department called the GPO Special Investigations Unit was responsible for intercepting letters as part of British intelligence service operations. The unit had branches in every major sorting office in the UK and in St Martin's Le Grand GPO, near St Paul's Cathedral. Letters targeted for interception by the Special Investigations Unit were steamed open and the contents photographed, and the photographs were then sent in unmarked green vans to MI5.

== Lists of senior officials ==
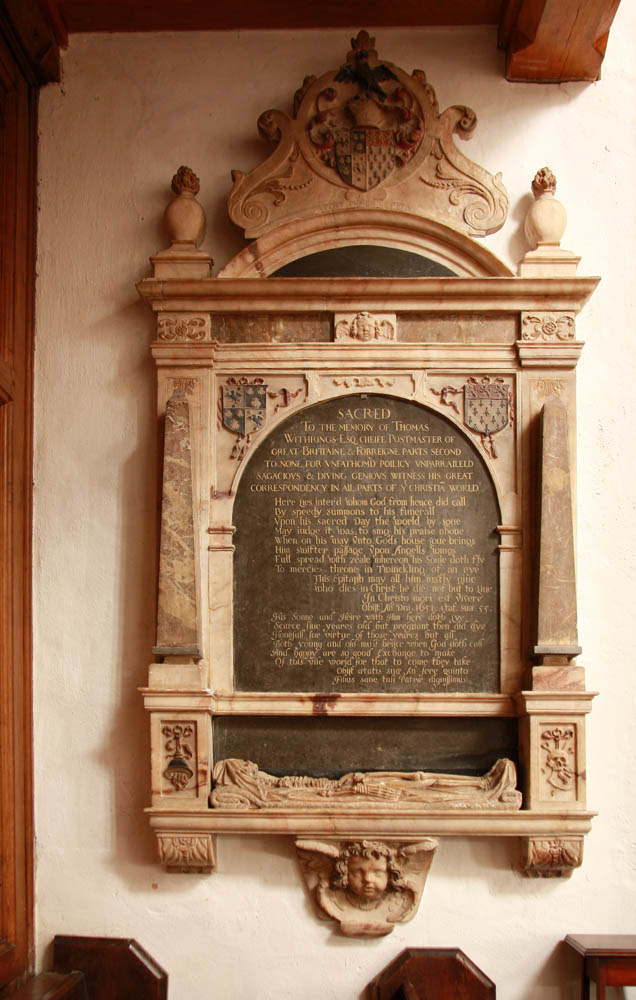
Monument in St Andrew's Church, Hornchurch, 'sacred to the memory of Thomas Witherings Esq, chiefe Postmaster of great Britaine and Foreigne Parts' (who died in 1651).

The Postmaster General was the government minister in charge of the GPO (the office was held jointly by two appointees between 1691 and 1823). The Secretary of the Post Office was the senior civil servant (equivalent to a permanent secretary), who managed the operation from day to day. Evelyn Murray, who served as Secretary until 1934, was not replaced when he left office. Instead a Director-General was appointed, together with a Board which brought together a number of GPO heads of department.

=== Secretaries of the Post Office ===
Name	Date of appointment
John Avent	20 June 1694
Benjamin Waterhouse	c.1700
Henry Weston	c.1714
Joseph Godman	c.1720
W. Rouse	c.1730
Thomas Robinson	c.1737
John D. Barbutt	15 September 1739
George Shelvocke	22 July 1742
Henry Potts	19 March 1760
Anthony Todd	1 December 1762
Henry Potts	19 July 1765
Anthony Todd	6 January 1768
Francis Freeling	7 June 1798
William Leader Maberly	29 September 1836
Rowland Hill	22 April 1854 (Note: Between 1846 and 1854 Hill had served in the distinct role of Secretary to the Postmaster General (a position created specifically for him).)
John Tilley	15 March 1864
Stevenson Arthur Blackwood	1 May 1880
Spencer Walpole	10 November 1893
George H. Murray	10 February 1899
Henry Babington Smith	1 October 1903
Matthew Nathan	17 January 1910
Alexander F. King	1 October 1911
Evelyn Murray	24 August 1914

=== Directors General of the Post Office ===
Name	Date of appointment
Donald Banks	14 April 1934
Thomas Gardiner	9 August 1936
Raymond Birchall	1 January 1946
Alexander Little	1 October 1949
Gordon Radley	1 October 1955
Ronald German	1 June 1960

Sir Ronald German was replaced by John Wall on 1 November 1966, who had been brought in from the private sector to serve as 'Deputy Chairman of the Board' in preparation for the GPO's disestablishment. He departed in September 1968, after which it was announced that the Postmaster General, John Stonehouse, would assume the role of 'Chairman and Chief Executive' in preparation for the business's re-establishment as a public corporation the following year.

== See also ==
- GPO Film Unit
- GPO telephones
- Post Office Research Station
- Postal, telegraph and telephone service
- Postmaster General of the United Kingdom
- Red telephone box
- Royal Mail
- Television licensing in the UK
