= Angel Street, London =

Street in the City of London

Angel Street
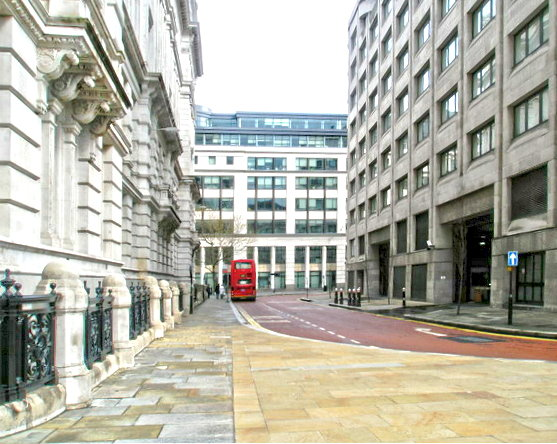
- Angel Street looking east
- Interactive map of Angel Street
- Former names: Angel Alley; Angel Court
- Area: St Martin's Le Grand
- Location: City of London
- Postal code: EC1A
- Coordinates: 51°30′58″N 0°5′51″W

Other
- Known for: The Angel Inn

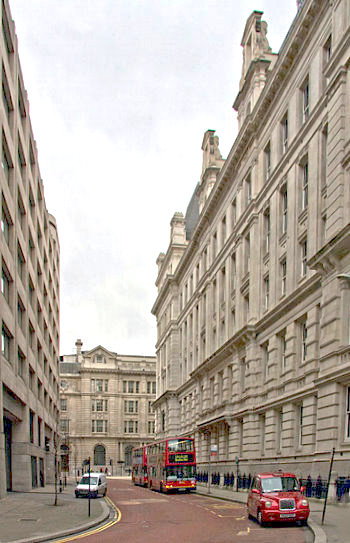
Angel Street looking west

Angel Street, formerly known as Angel Alley, Angel Court, and Angell Street, is a street in the City of London that runs between King Edward Street in the west and St Martin's Le Grand in the east. Although dating back to at least 1542, no original buildings now remain due to the effects of the Great Fire of London, the London Blitz, and redevelopment.

Buildings in the street were damaged in the Great Fire of 1666 when Poulterer's Hall was destroyed, and in the early nineteenth century many buildings were demolished for redevelopment and due to their "ruinous" state. The Angel Inn, which dated from the 17th century, survived on the north side until around 1840.

In the late nineteenth century, the General Post Office (West), which included the Central Telegraph Office, was built on the south side of the street and a further post office building soon after replaced the whole of the north side of the street. In 1940, the telegraph office was seriously damaged during the London Blitz and subsequently demolished in 1967. The site is now occupied by the BT Centre (1984) so that today the street consists solely of two long office frontages.

== Origins ==
Angel Street runs between King Edward Street (originally Butcher Hall Lane) in the west and St Martin's Le Grand in the east. In the Middle Ages, Angel Alley was regarded as part of the sanctuary of St Martin's Le Grand and a witness in a 1536–1537 Star Chamber case testified that the future Cardinal Morton took sanctuary in Angel Alley in the fifteenth century. Angel Alley is also mentioned as within the College of St Martin's Le Grand in the Letters and Papers of the Reign of Henry VIII for 1542.

John Strype referred to it as Angel Alley in his 1720 survey which was based on John Stow's surveys of 1598 and 1603 and William Herbert gave its former name as Angel Court. It is recorded as Angel Street on John Ogilby and William Morgan's Large Scale Map of the City As Rebuilt By 1676 which shows the plan of London after its rebuilding following the fire. The eastern end of the street was part of the Liberty of St Martin's Le Grand.

The Poulters' Hall stood on the corner of Butcher Hall Lane and Angel Street from 1630 until it was burned in the Great Fire of London in 1666 and the Angel coaching inn stood on the north side from the 17th century. It is unknown whether the inn was named after the street or vice versa.

== 18th and 19th centuries ==
King's Head Court was established on the south side on the corner with St Martin's Le Grand by 1746 and appears on John Rocque's map of that year.

In 1809, the Angel Inn was described in The Picture of London as "much frequented by Scotch gentlemen and persons from the North". In 1825, the same directory listed it as among the principal inns visited by mail and stage coaches in London, and a hotel, coffee-house, and tavern. The inn was demolished in around 1840.

It was also in the early decades of the nineteenth century that a number of buildings in Angel Street were acquired to allow for the expansion of Christ's Hospital, including the Queen's Head (Queen's Hotel) on the north side on the corner with St Martin's Le Grand. Houses on the north side were demolished and the land let by the governors of the hospital to allow for the building of a new Bull and Mouth Inn. On the south side at the St Martin's Le Grand end, a number of houses described as "very ruinous" were demolished in Angel Street and King's Head Court in 1835 after they were condemned by a ward-inquest.

In 1869, work started on a new post office building known as General Post Office (West) to distinguish it from the old General Post Office building on the east side of St Martin Le Grand. It opened in 1874, also becoming the post office's Central Telegraph Office. Following the construction of the telegraph office, Bath Street, later known as Roman Bath Street, was joined to the south side of Angel Street which connected it to Newgate Street in the south. It had formerly been known as Bagnio Court in reference to the "Turkish baths" that stood there. In 1890, the foundation stone was laid for the construction of a building known as General Post Office (North) which took up the whole of the north side of Angel Street and led to the demolition of the remaining buildings on that side of the street. It was designed by Henry Tanner.

== 20th century and later ==
The telegraph office was slightly damaged by a bomb during the First World War; the office received more damage during the London Blitz in 1940 when burning debris from adjacent buildings set it alight and totally destroyed the interior. It reopened in 1943 but closed again in 1962 and was demolished in 1967.

The BT Centre, formerly the headquarters of British Telecom, opened in 1984 and now occupies the whole southern side of Angel Street including the former course of Bath Street, which was closed in 1934. The former post office building on the northern side of Angel Street is now known as Nomura House at 1 St Martin's Le Grand.

== Maps ==
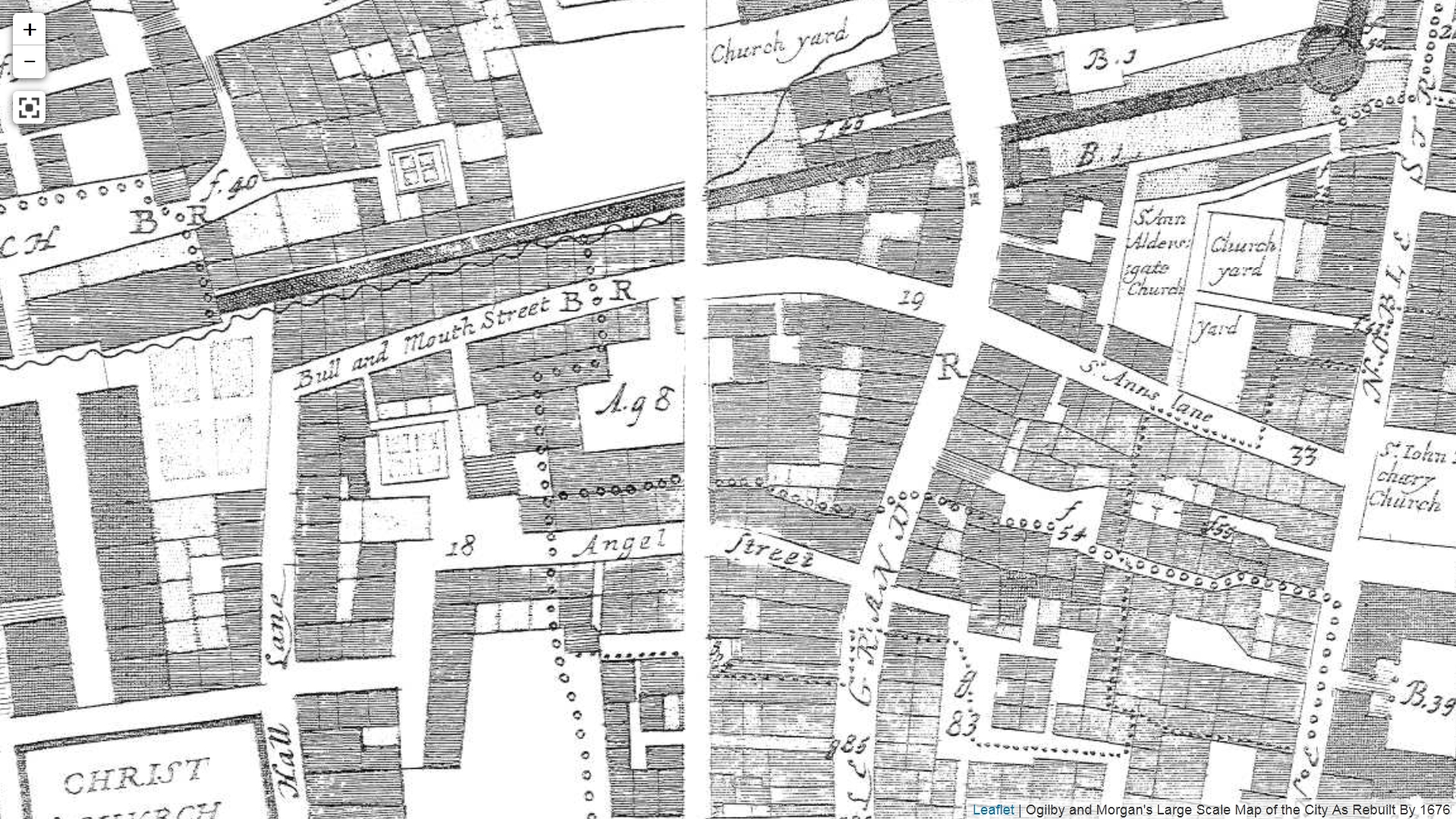
Angel Street (centre) on Ogilby & Morgan's 1676 map.

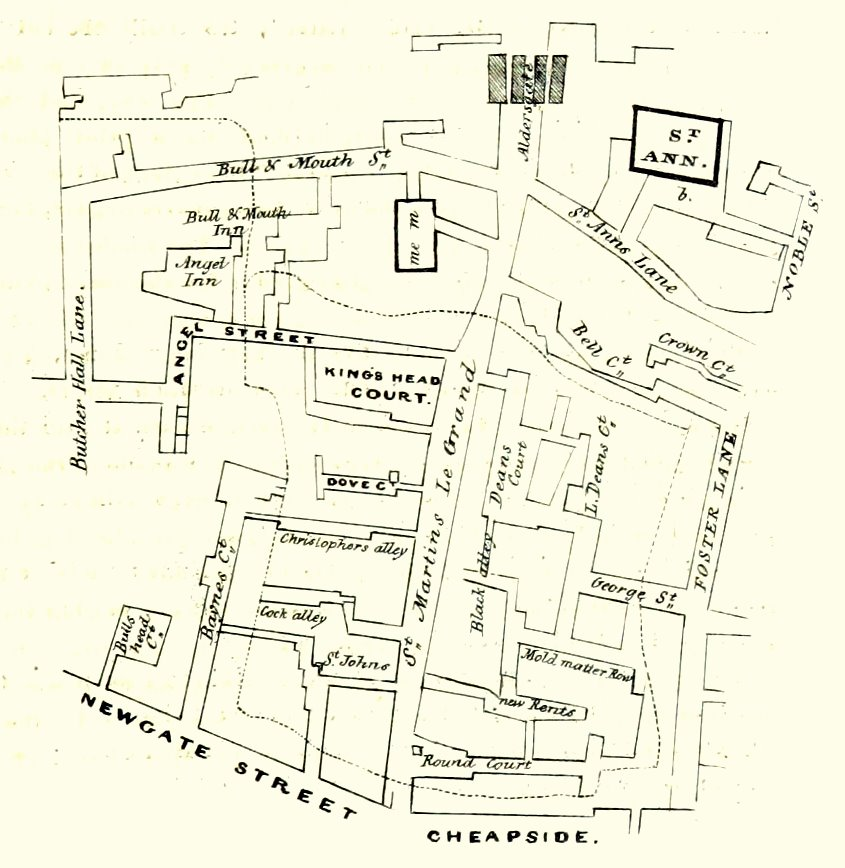
Angel Street and the Angel Inn on John Rocque's Map of London, 1746

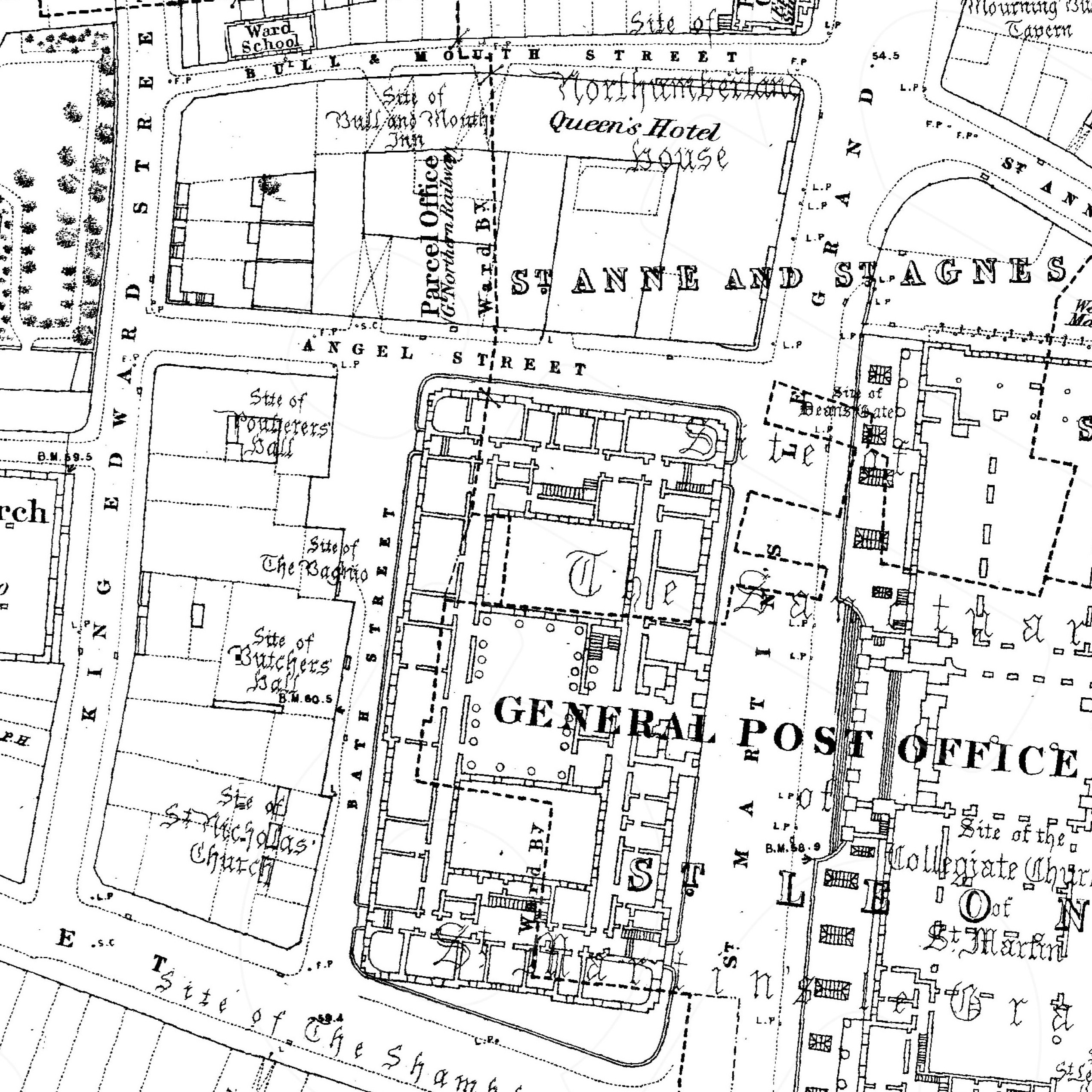
Angel Street on an 1875 Ordnance Survey map

== See also ==
- Bull and Mouth Street
