= Bull and Mouth Street =

Former street in the City of London

Coordinates: 51°30′59.83″N 0°5′51.92″W

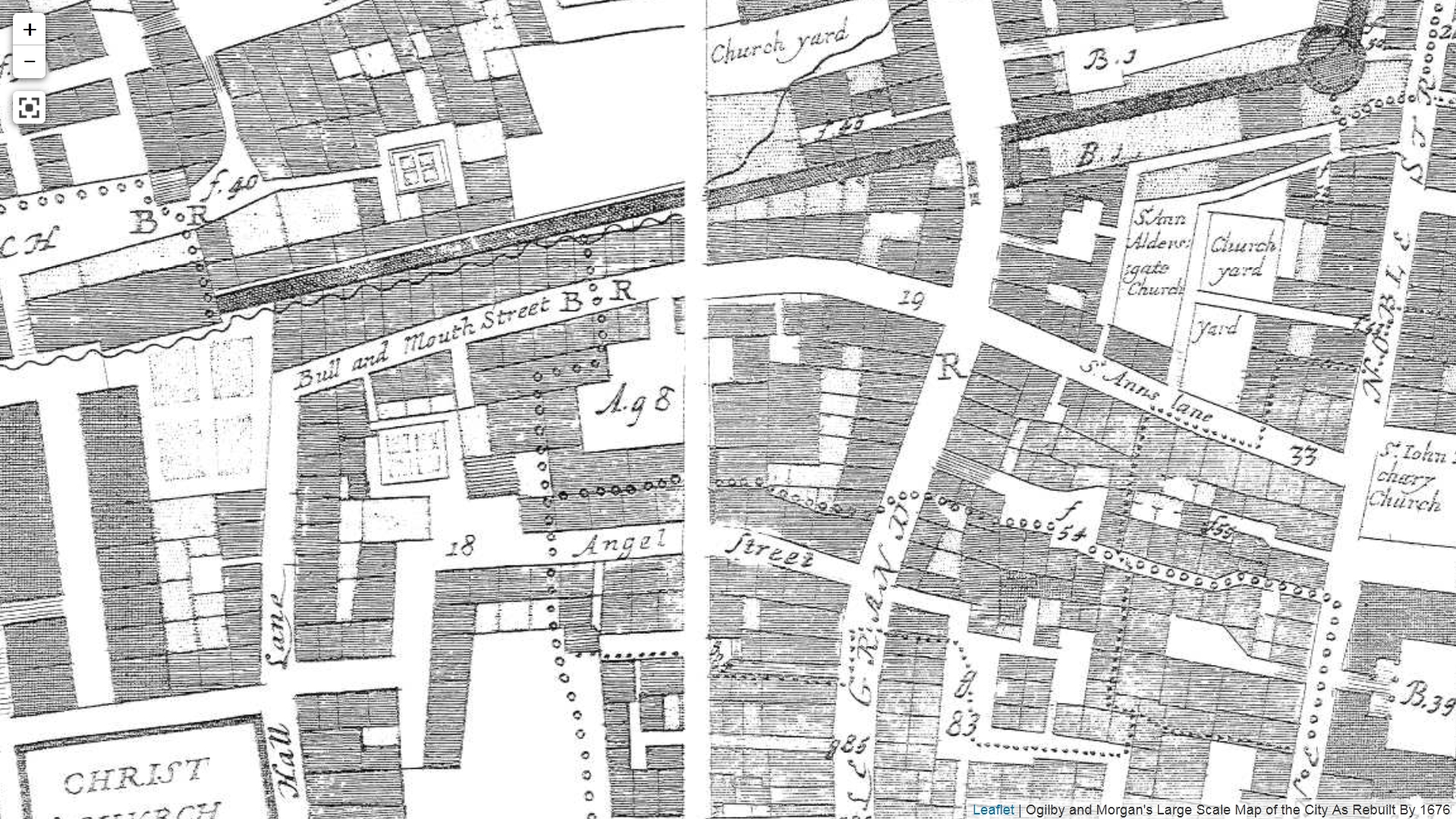
Bull and Mouth Street (centre) on Ogilby & Morgan's 1676 map.

Bull and Mouth Street was a street in the City of London that ran between Edward Street (Hall Lane) and St Martin's Le Grand. On part of its site stands Postman's Park.

== Origins ==
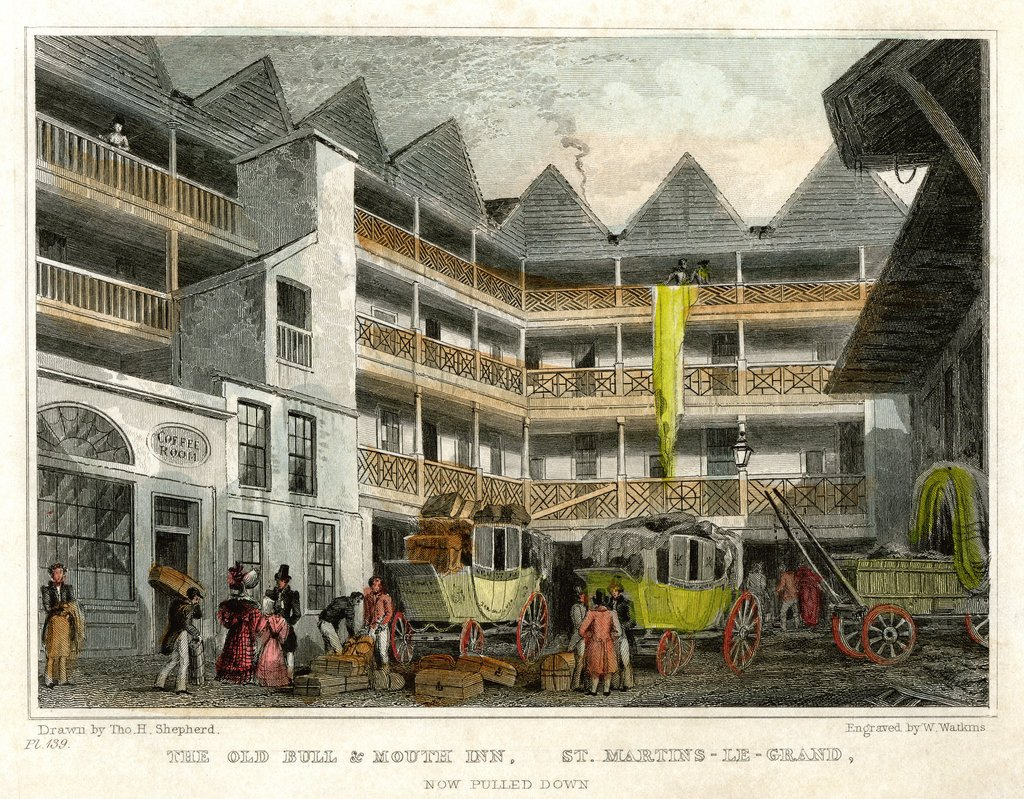
The Old Bull & Mouth Inn, St. Martin's-Le-Grand, engraved by W. Watkins, after Thomas Hosmer Shepherd.

The street may once have been known as Stukeley's Street.

The street is named after the Bull and Mouth Inn which stood on the south side from at least the time of the Great Fire of London in 1666 when it was destroyed. It was subsequently rebuilt. It may date even earlier as the original name of the inn was the Boulogne Mouth, a reference to the siege of the town and harbour of Boulogne by the English kings Henry VII and Henry VIII in 1544–46. Over time, the name became corrupted into Bull and Mouth. The street was first recorded on John Ogilby and William Morgan's Large Scale Map of the City As Rebuilt By 1676.

== History ==
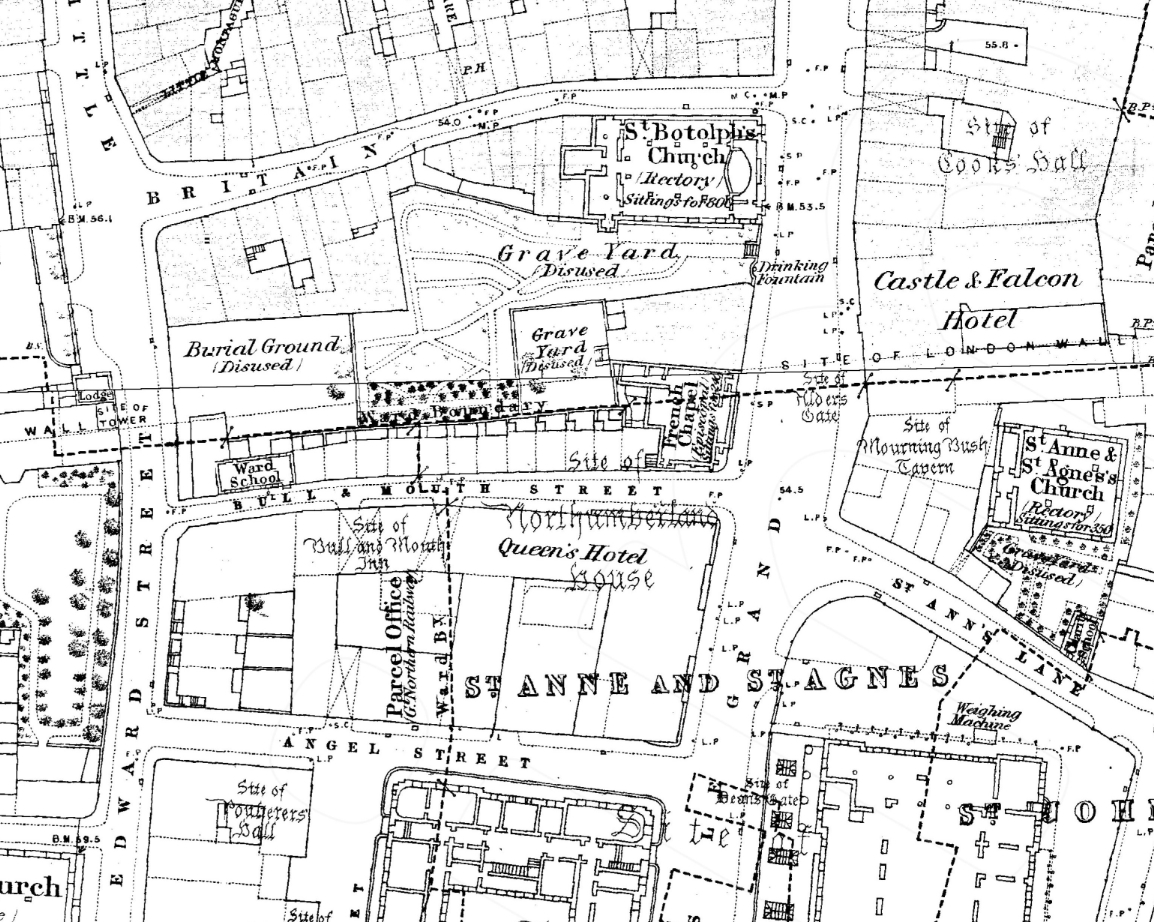
Bull and Mouth Street (centre) on an 1875 Ordnance Survey map.

Bull and Mouth Street appears on Richard Horwood's map of London published in 1813. An 1875 Ordnance Survey map shows there to have been a ward school on the north side at the western end and the French Protestant Chapel (1842) at the eastern end on the corner with St Martin's Le Grand. On the south side was The Queen's Hotel on the corner with St Martin's Le Grand, formerly the Bull and Mouth Inn, rebuilt as a hotel by the coaching entrepreneur Edward Sherman at a cost of £60,000. The architect was Savage. The hotel provided accommodation for passengers and underground stabling for 700 horses.

The street and the hotel and chapel were demolished in 1887 or 1888 to make way for new post office buildings at 1 St Martin's Le Grand, later Nomura House. Bull and Mouth Street was located approximately where Postman's Park is today.
