= Edward Sherman =

Edward Sherman may refer to:

- Edward Sherman (coach proprietor) (c. 1777–1866), British coach proprietor from Berkshire
- Edward F. Sherman, American professor at Tulane Law School

== See also ==
- Edward A. Sherman Publishing Company
