= King Edward Street, London =

Street in the City of London

Coordinates: 51°30′58″N 0°05′55″W

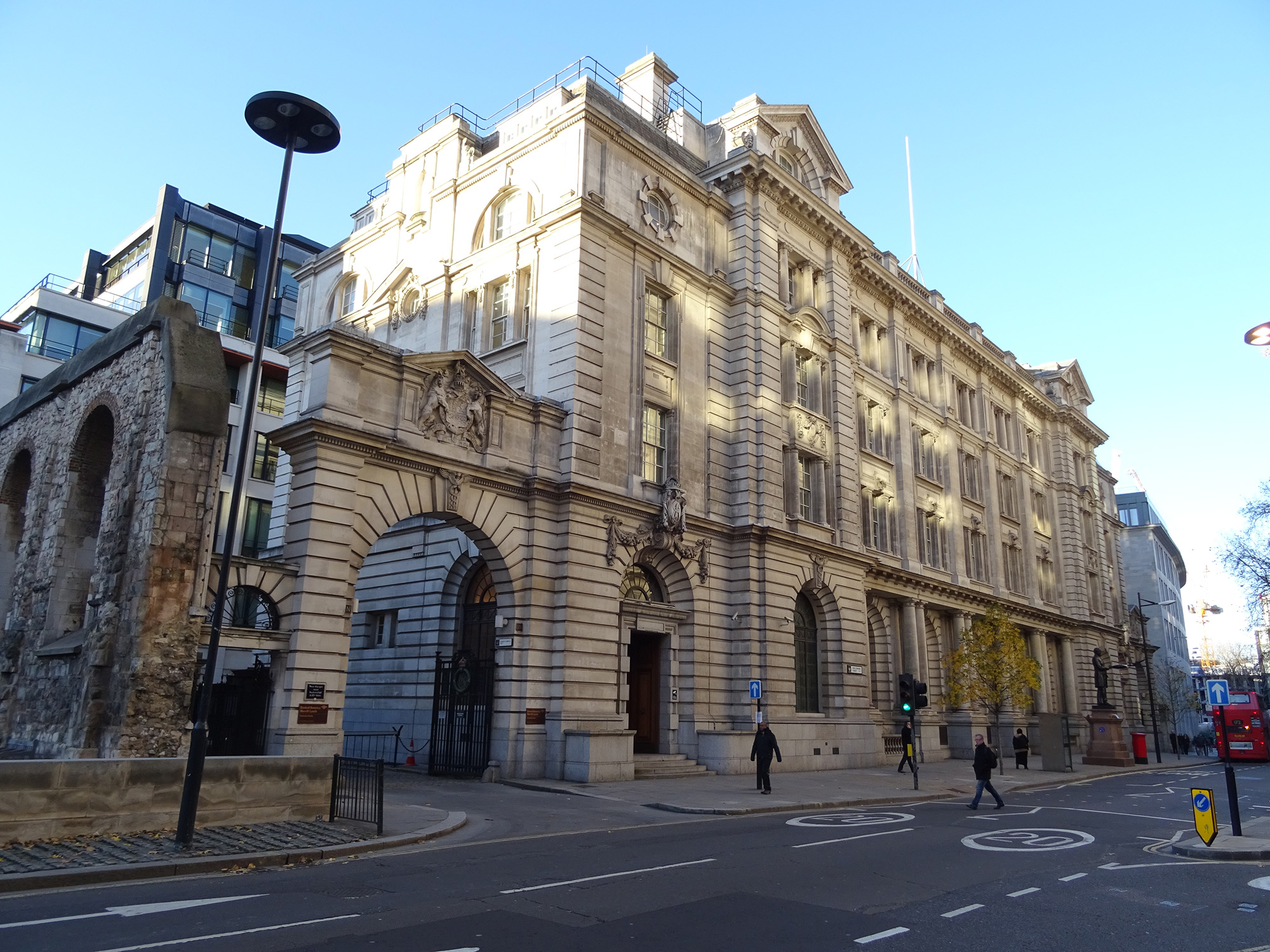
King Edward Street

King Edward Street is a street in the City of London that runs from Newgate Street in the south to Little Britain in the north. It is joined by Greyfriars Passage in the west and Angel Street in the east. Postman's Park is on its east side where Bull and Mouth Street once lay and joined King Edward Street.

== History ==
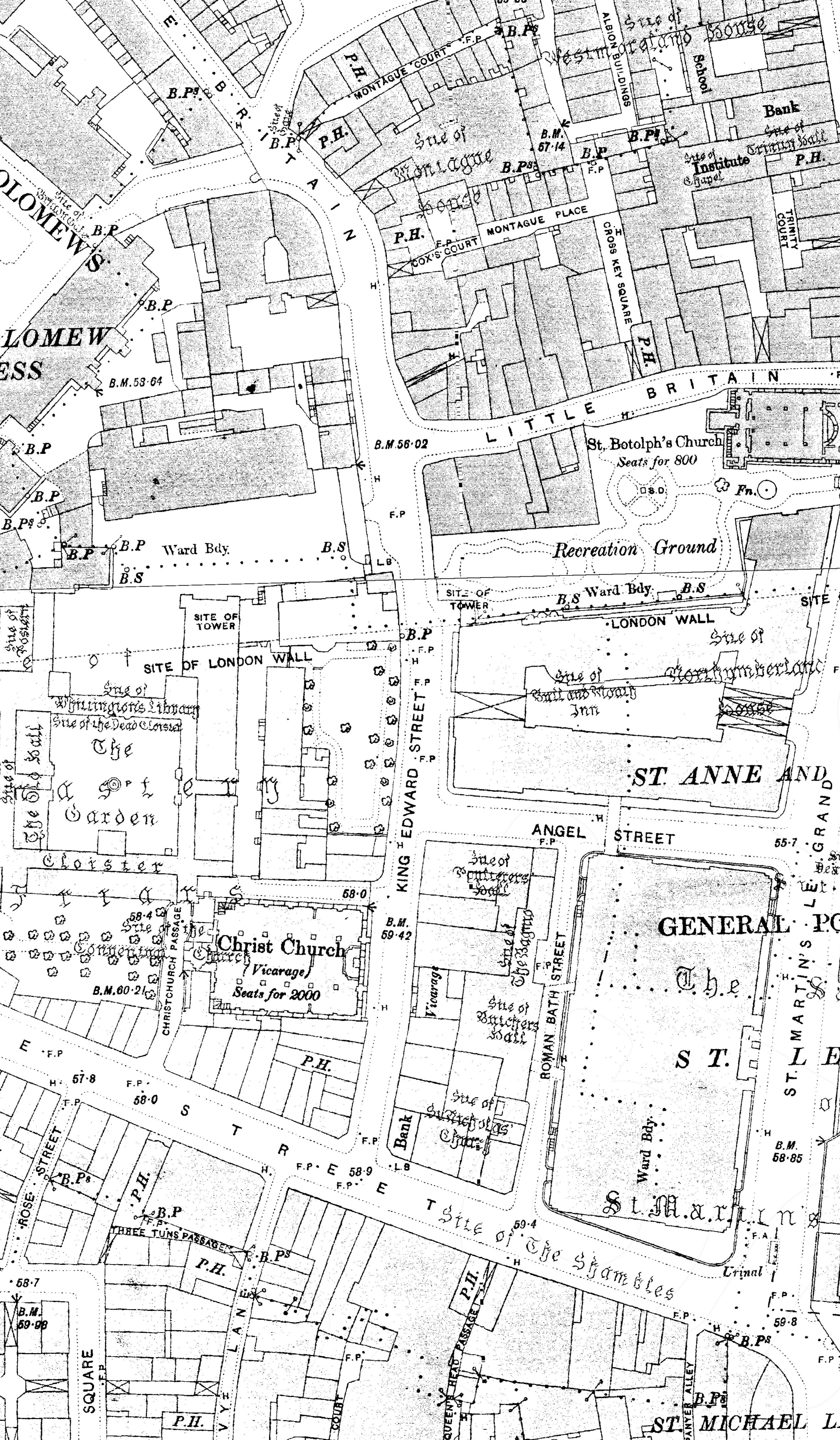
King Edward Street (centre, vertical) on an 1896 Ordnance Survey map

The street was once known for its butchers and slaughterhouses and had the names Butchers' Hall Lane, Stinking Lane, Chick Lane, and Blowbladder Street. According to John Strype by 1720 the butchers had been replaced by milliners and seamstresses. It received its current name in 1843 in memory of King Edward VI.

== Buildings ==
Notable buildings in the street include:

- The remains of Christ Church Greyfriars.
- King Edward Buildings (London Chief Office of the General Post Office until 1994; now Bank of America Merrill Lynch).
- The statue of Rowland Hill (inscribed 'He founded uniform penny postage – 1840').
- 1 St Martin's Le Grand (rear) (Post Office Headquarters until 1984; now Nomura House).
- BT Centre (BT Group Head Office until 2021); (main entrance in Newgate Street).
