= St. Martin's Le Grand =

Street in the City of London

Coordinates: 51°30′59″N 0°5′49″W

St. Martin's Le Grand looking south:

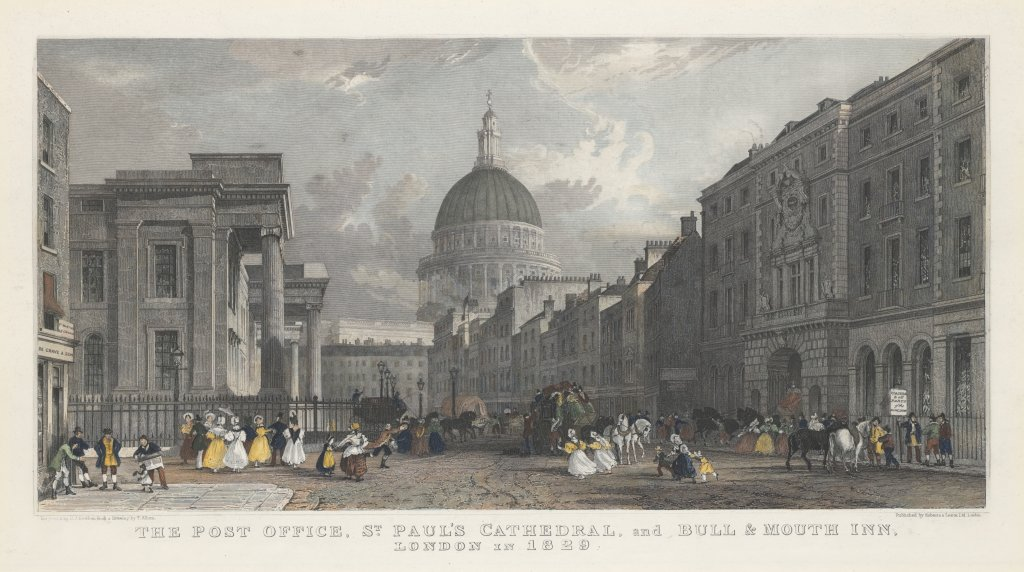
Engraving by G.J. Emblem after T. Allom: The Post Office, St. Paul's Cathedral, and Bull & Mouth Inn, London in 1829.

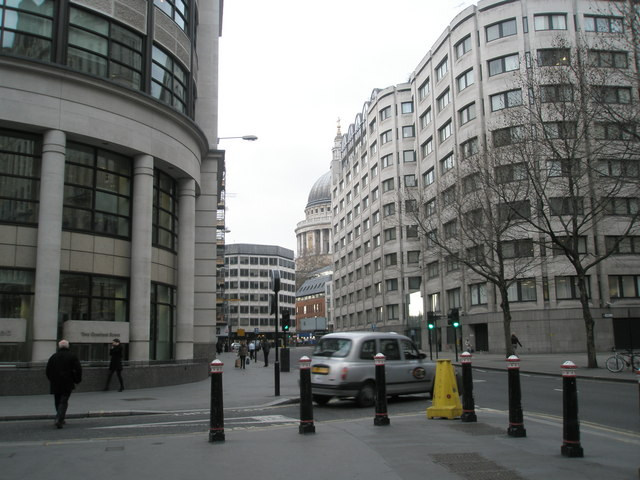
The same view in 2007

St. Martin's Le Grand is a former liberty within the City of London, and is the name of a street north of Newgate Street and Cheapside and south of Aldersgate Street. It forms the southernmost section of the A1 road. For many years St. Martin's Le Grand was "often used as a synonym for the chief postal authorities, as Scotland Yard is used to designate the police", the headquarters of the General Post Office having been there from 1829 to 1984.

== College of canons and collegiate church ==
To the east of the road in medieval times stood a college of secular canons of ancient origin, with a collegiate church dedicated to St Martin of Tours. The institution was situated in the City of London parish of St Leonard, Foster Lane.

According to a somewhat dubious tradition, the college and church dated to the 7th or 8th century and was founded by King Wihtred of Kent. It was, more certainly, rebuilt or founded about 1056 by two brothers, Ingelric and Girard, during the reign of Edward the Confessor. Its foundation was confirmed by a charter of William the Conqueror, dating to 1068.

The church was responsible for the sounding of the curfew bell in the evenings, which announced the closing of the city's gates. It also had certain rights of sanctuary; these persisted until 1697 and, as such, made the locality a notorious haven for malefactors. One who was said to have sought sanctuary here was Miles Forrest, one of Thomas More's reputed murderers of the Princes in the Tower in his dramatic 16th-century tale.

The college was taken over by Westminster Abbey in 1503 as part of the endowment granted for the upkeep of the Henry VII Chapel. This was an arrangement allowing the abbey to appropriate the college's revenues, and did not make the latter a monastery.

== Liberty ==
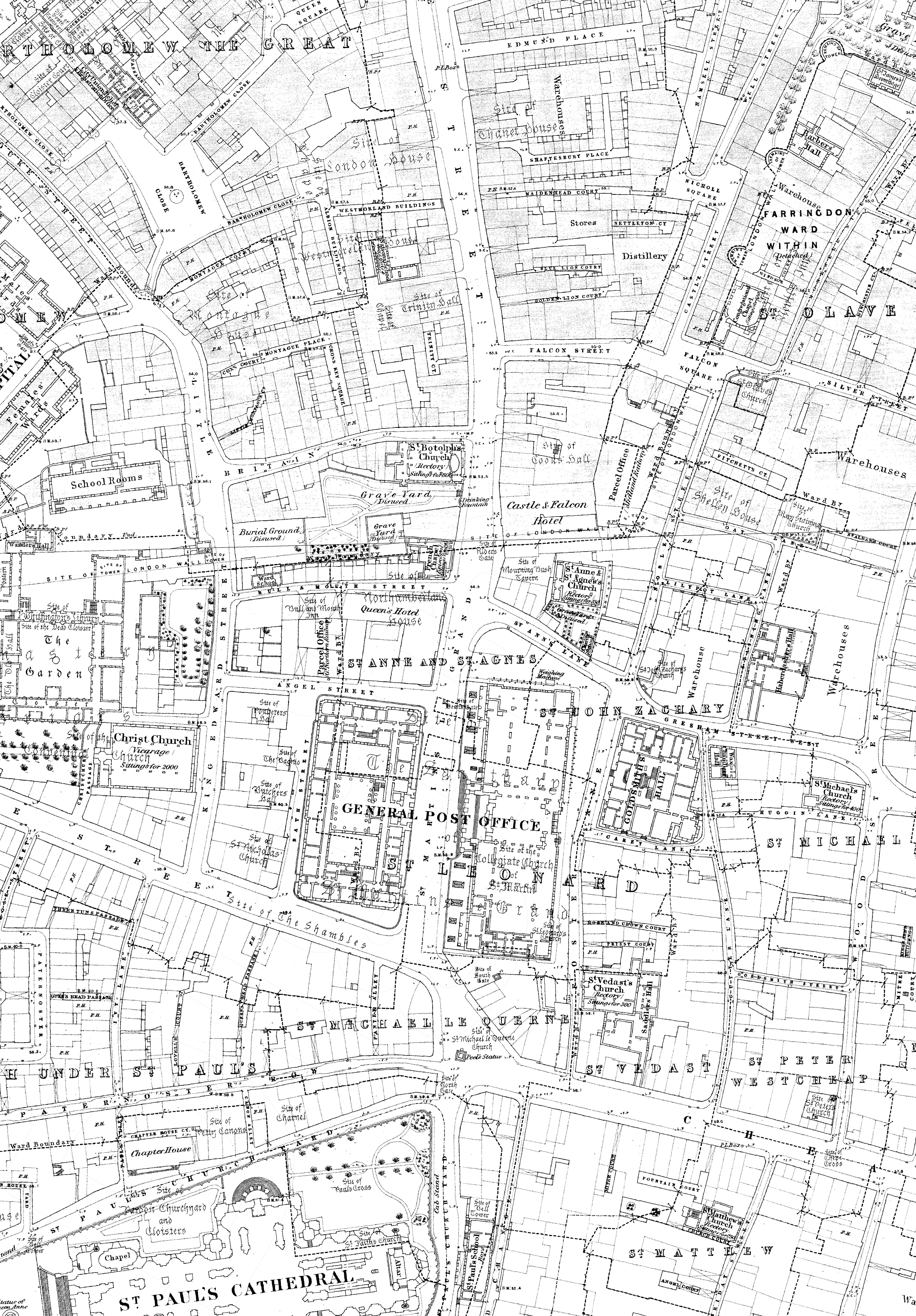
The St Martin's Le Grand area on an 1875 Ordnance Survey map.

As the property of a monastery, the college was dissolved by King Henry VIII and demolished for redevelopment in 1548.

However, the link with Westminster Abbey meant that the precinct was subsequently regarded as part of the borough of Westminster, and as a liberty: a district outside the jurisdiction of the legal officers of the City of London. The inhabitants voted in the Westminster borough elections up to the Reform Act 1832, and the liberty was regarded as an exclave of Middlesex.

This was despite the City of London and Westminster Streets and Post Office Act 1815 (55 Geo. 3. c. xci) annexing the liberty to the Aldersgate Ward of the City of London when the site was earmarked for a new General Post Office.

== General Post Office ==
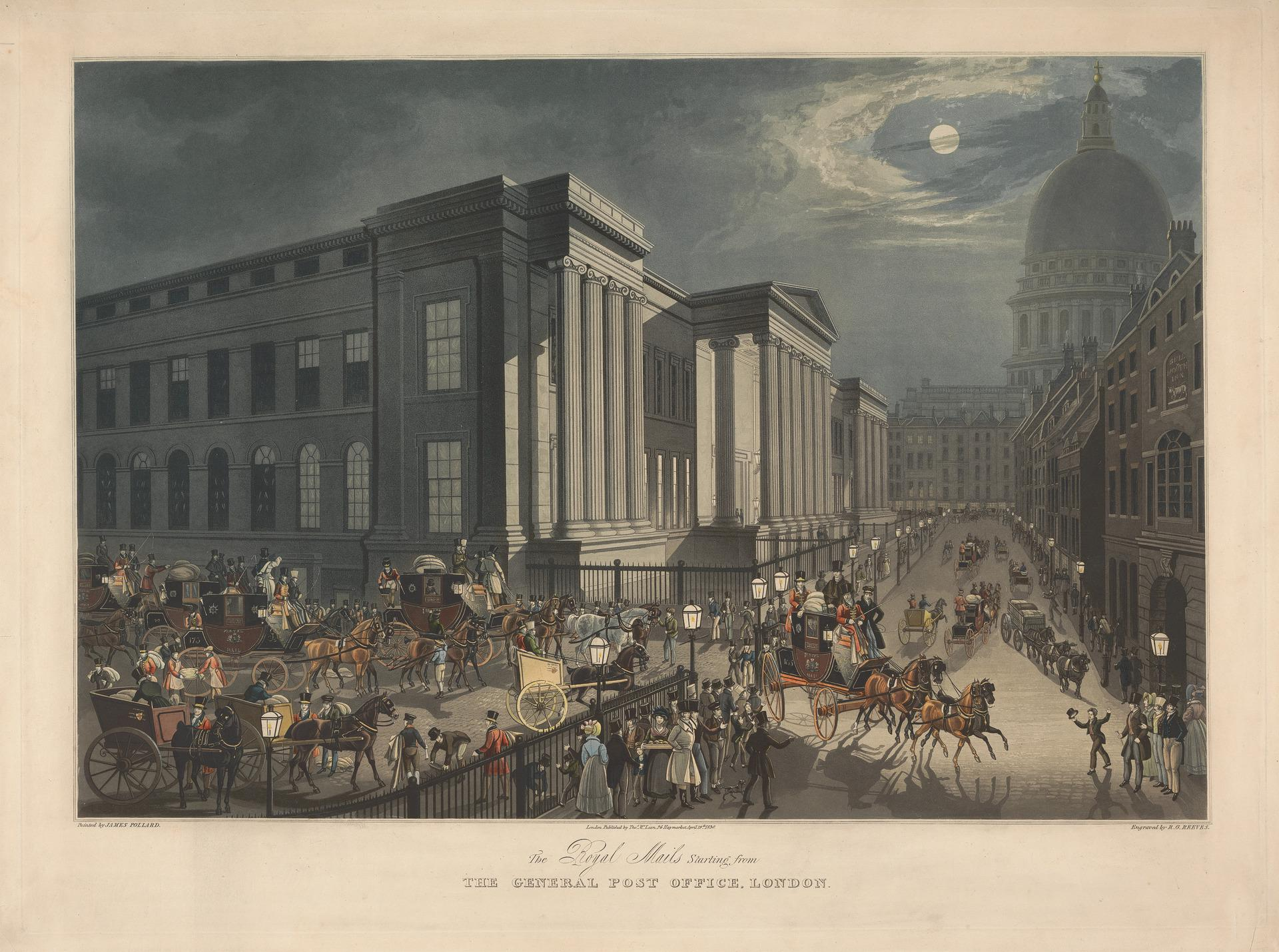
The Royal Mails Starting from the General Post Office, London. Richard Gilson Reeve, 1830.

The General Post Office (GPO) established its national headquarters on the site of the monastic precinct after the City of London and Westminster Streets and Post Office Act 1815 (55 Geo. 3. c. xci) authorised the project. In 1825 construction began of the General Post Office building, a Neoclassical design by Robert Smirke, which opened in 1829. As well as accommodating the Postmaster General and other senior staff, the building functioned as London's main sorting office and public post office. In the early years, before they were superseded by the railway, mail coaches departed from here for destinations across the country. The coaches and horses were made ready at the Bull and Mouth Inn, which stood directly across the street from the Post Office. Coaches bound for the north went up St Martin's Le Grand through Aldersgate; this became the first section of the Great North Road (now the A1 route) to York and Edinburgh), replacing the road's previous starting point at Hicks Hall in Smithfield Market.

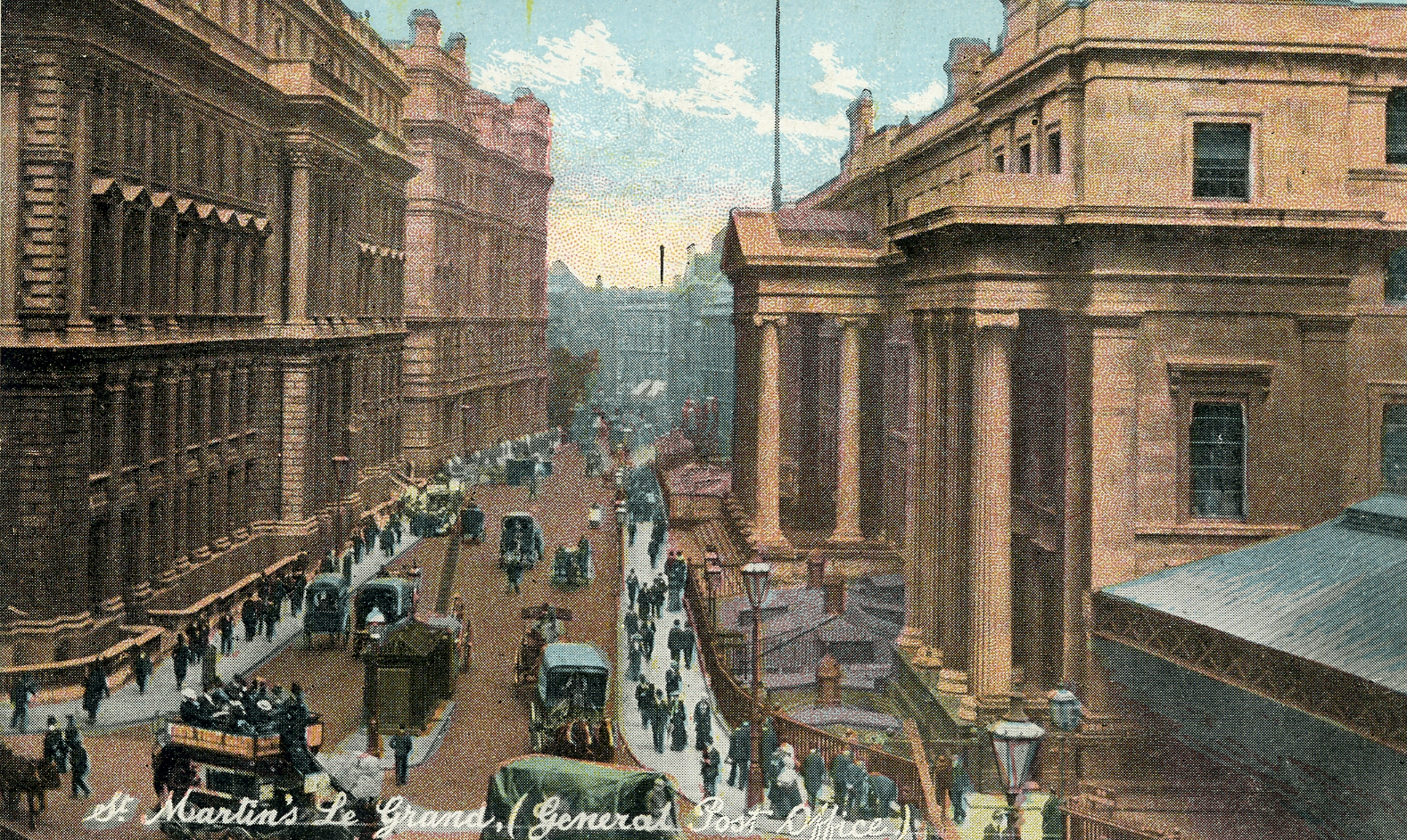
St. Martin's Le Grand looking north, c.1900 (GPO buildings highlighted).

In the latter part of the 19th century the GPO erected further buildings on the west side of St. Martin's Le Grand, for telegraph workers (1874) and headquarters staff (1894). The old General Post Office building remained in use as a sorting office and a public post office until 1911, when it was demolished and replaced by new premises to the west (on the former site of Christ's Hospital school). Post Office Headquarters remained at 1 St. Martin's Le Grand until 1984. The BT Centre, built that same year on the site of the old GPO Telegraph building, was until 2021 the global headquarters of BT Group (which had originally been created out of the Post Office Telecommunications division in 1981).

=== Wireless development ===
Guglielmo Marconi and his assistant George Kemp successfully demonstrated the wireless telegraphy system between two Post Office buildings on 27 July 1896. A transmitter was placed on the roof of the Central Telegraph Office on St. Martin's Le Grand, and a receiver on the roof of the General Post Office South on Carter Lane. The distance between the two buildings was 300 metres (yards). Later that year the Post Office provided funding for Marconi to conduct further experiments on Salisbury Plain. There is a plaque at the transmitter site (which later became the BT Centre), but no such marker on the building at the receiver site in Carter Lane.

== French Protestant chapel ==
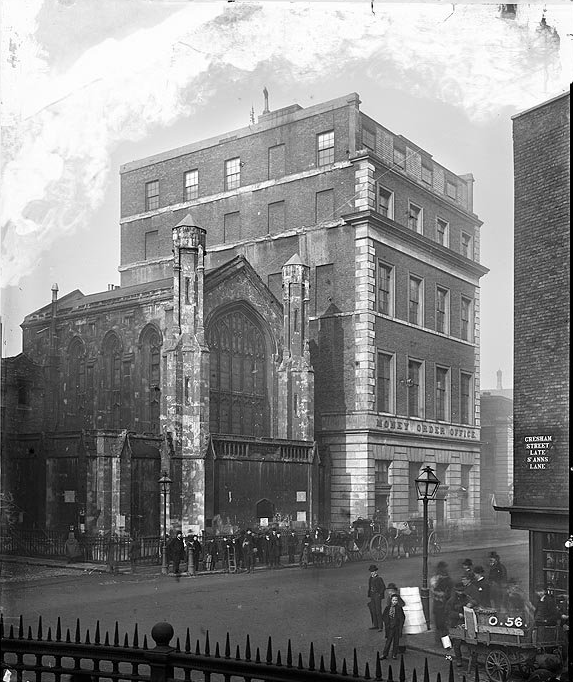
French Protestant chapel (left) and Sydney Smirke's GPO Money Order Office of 1847 (right, at 1 Aldersgate Street). Both were demolished in 1888.

A French Protestant chapel stood on the west side on the corner with Bull and Mouth Street from 1842 until 1888, when it was demolished to make way for new and expanded post office buildings.

== Transport links ==
The nearest London Underground station is St Paul's (originally named Post Office), at the southern end of the street.
