= Masbro Road =

Street in London

Coordinates: 51°29′56.91″N 0°12′57.54″W

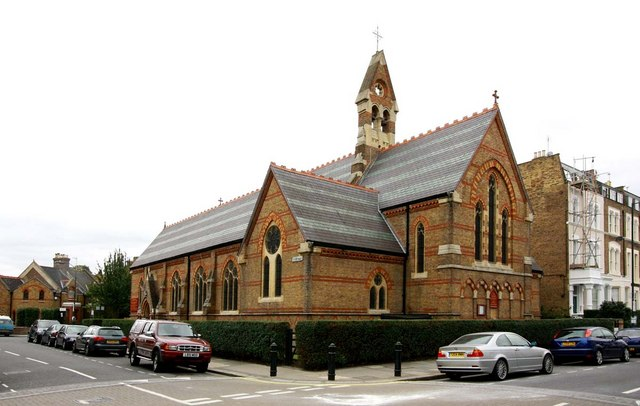
Parish Church of St Matthew, seen from Sinclair Road

Masbro Road is in the London Borough of Hammersmith, England. It runs from Sinclair Road in the north to Blythe Road in the south. It is joined on the west side by Fielding Road, Irving Road, Redan Street, and Springvale Terrace. It is joined on the east side by Hofland Road and crossed by Milson Road.

== History ==
The road was originally known as Masboro Road North, the original Masboro Road being located to the south where Caithness Road is now. It began to be developed in the mid nineteenth century but at that time did not extend much further north than what is now Milson Road. By the end of the century the whole area was developed, mainly with two-up two-down late-Victorian houses.

In 1970, the street was declared a General Improvement Area (GIA).

Former residents include the London artist W.H. Prior in the 1880s.

== Buildings ==
At the north end is the Parish Church of St Matthew on the corner with Sinclair Road.

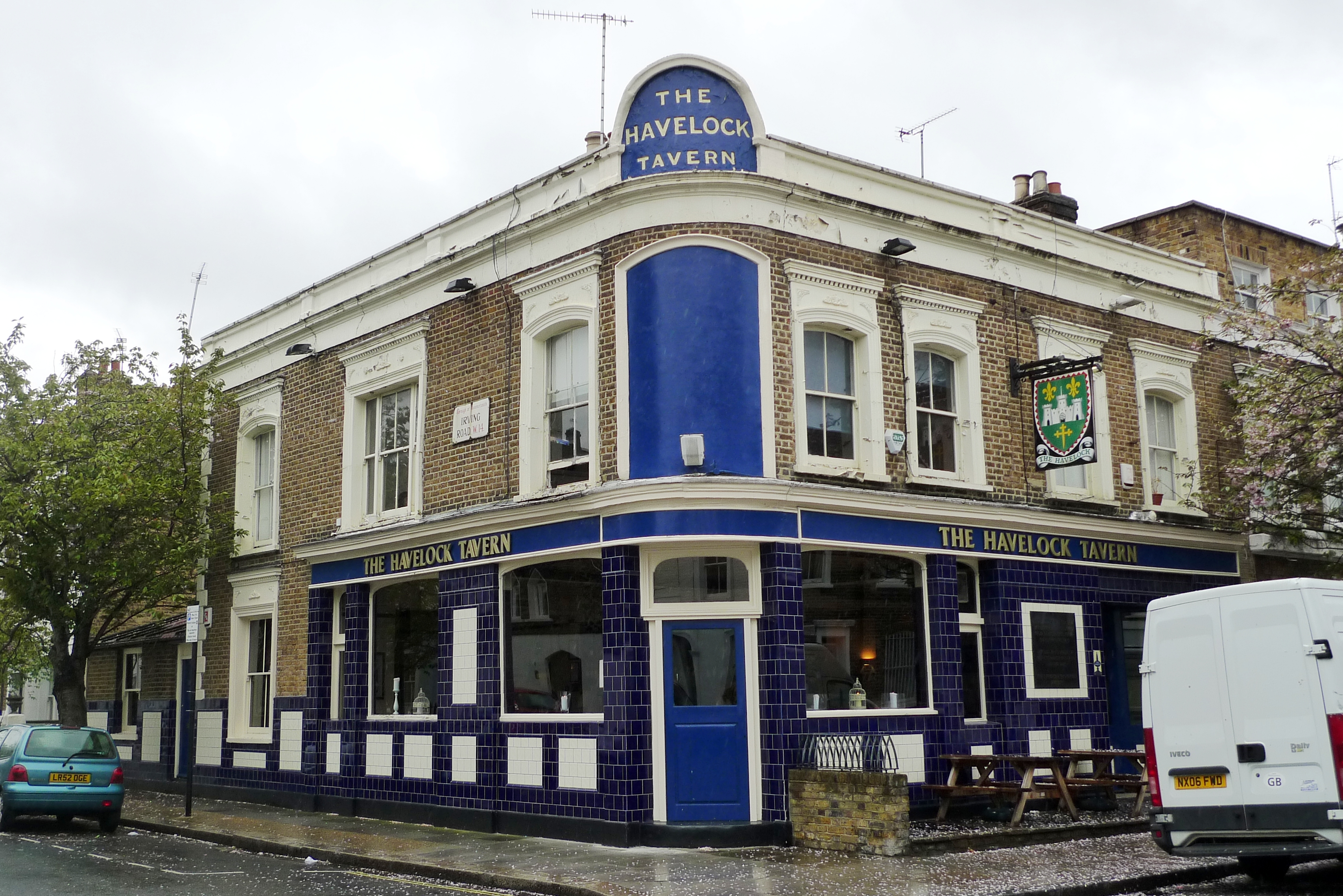
The Havelock Tavern

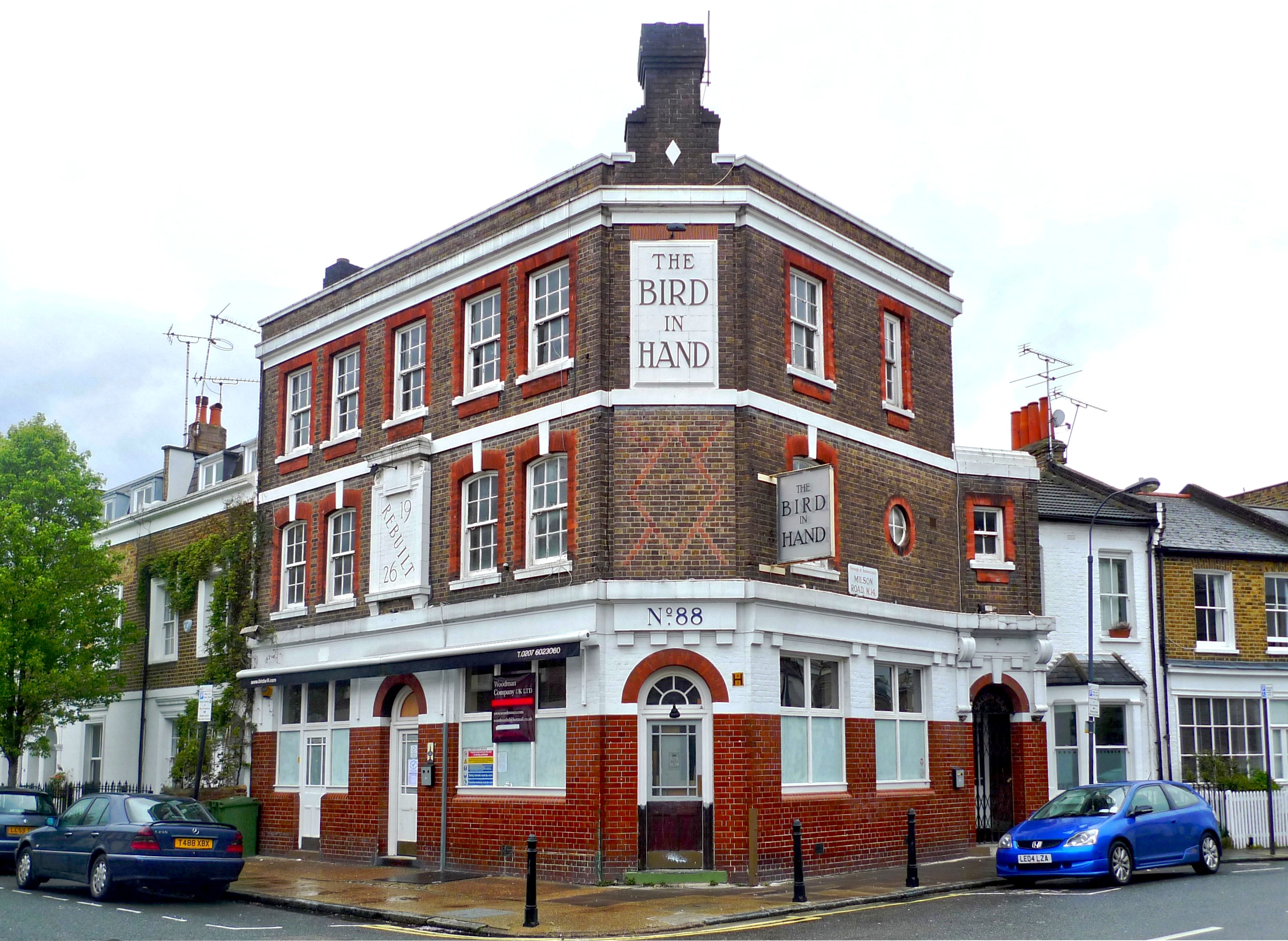
The former Bird in Hand public house

The street contains three public houses, the Havelock Tavern on the corner with Irving Road, the former Bird in Hand (rebuilt 1926) on the corner with Milson Road, and the Old Parrs Head on the corner with Blythe Road. The original Bird in Hand dated from at least the 1860s, and the other two pubs to before 1900.

Nikolaus Pevsner writes that The St Mary's Roman Catholic Primary, designed by P.J. Mabley in 1977–78, has the semi-open plan introduced in the late 1960s. Opposite is Springvale Terrace, designed by Renton Howard Wood Associates 1967–70, which Pevsner writes was one of the local authority's "early attempts at an alternative urban recipe for high-rise flats", and obtrusive because of its dark brickwork.

== Maps ==
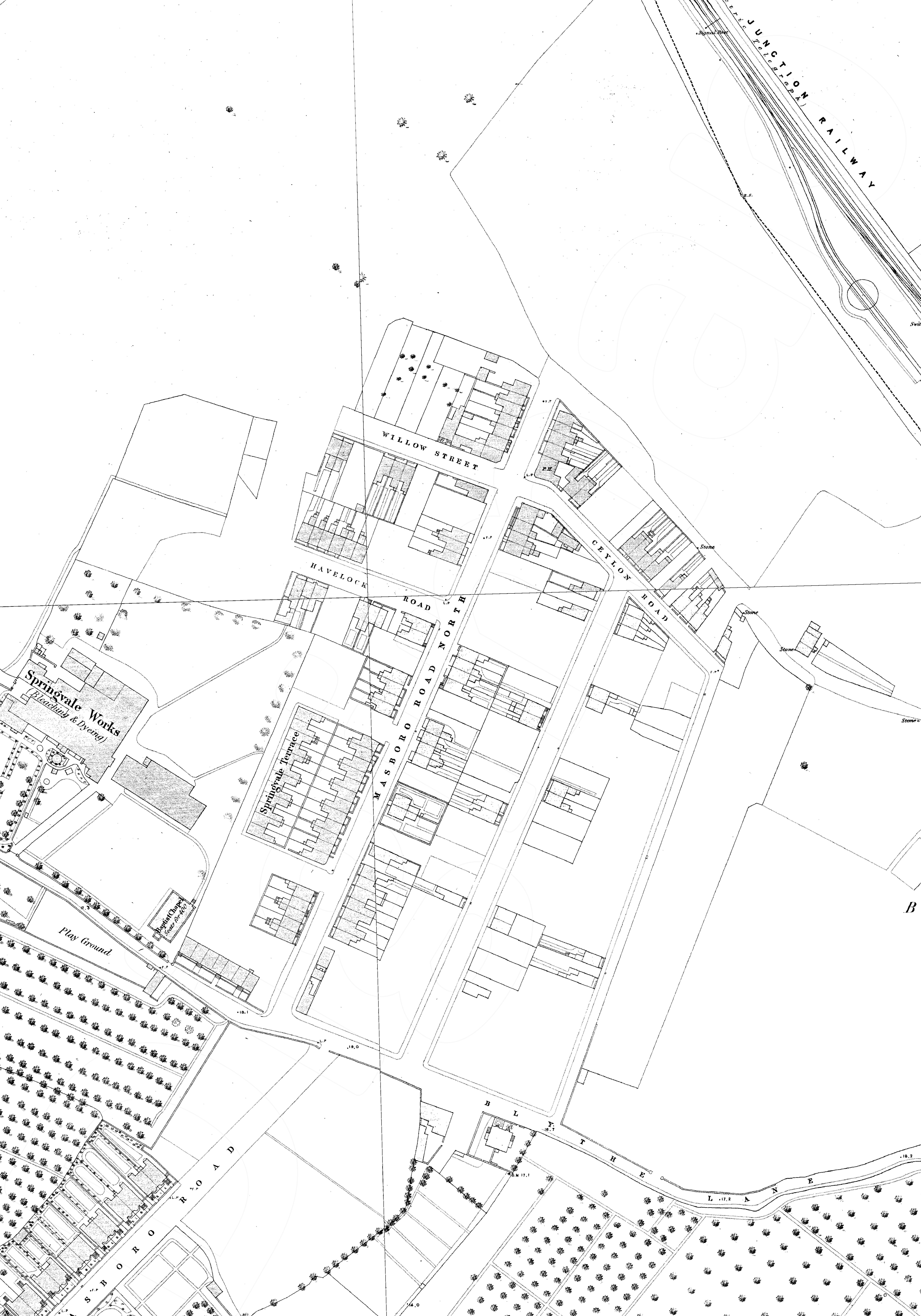
1860s Ordnance Survey map

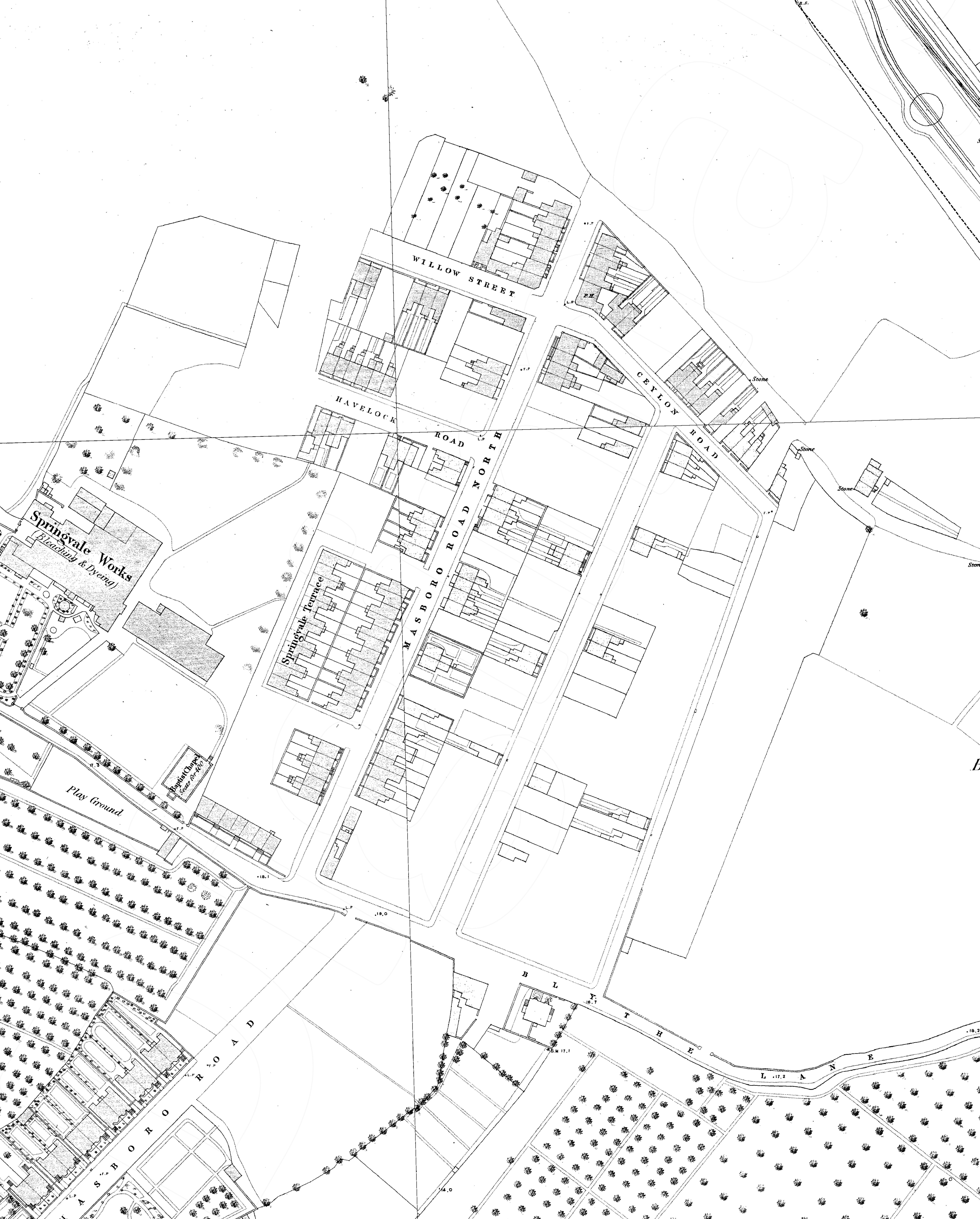
1872 Ordnance Survey map

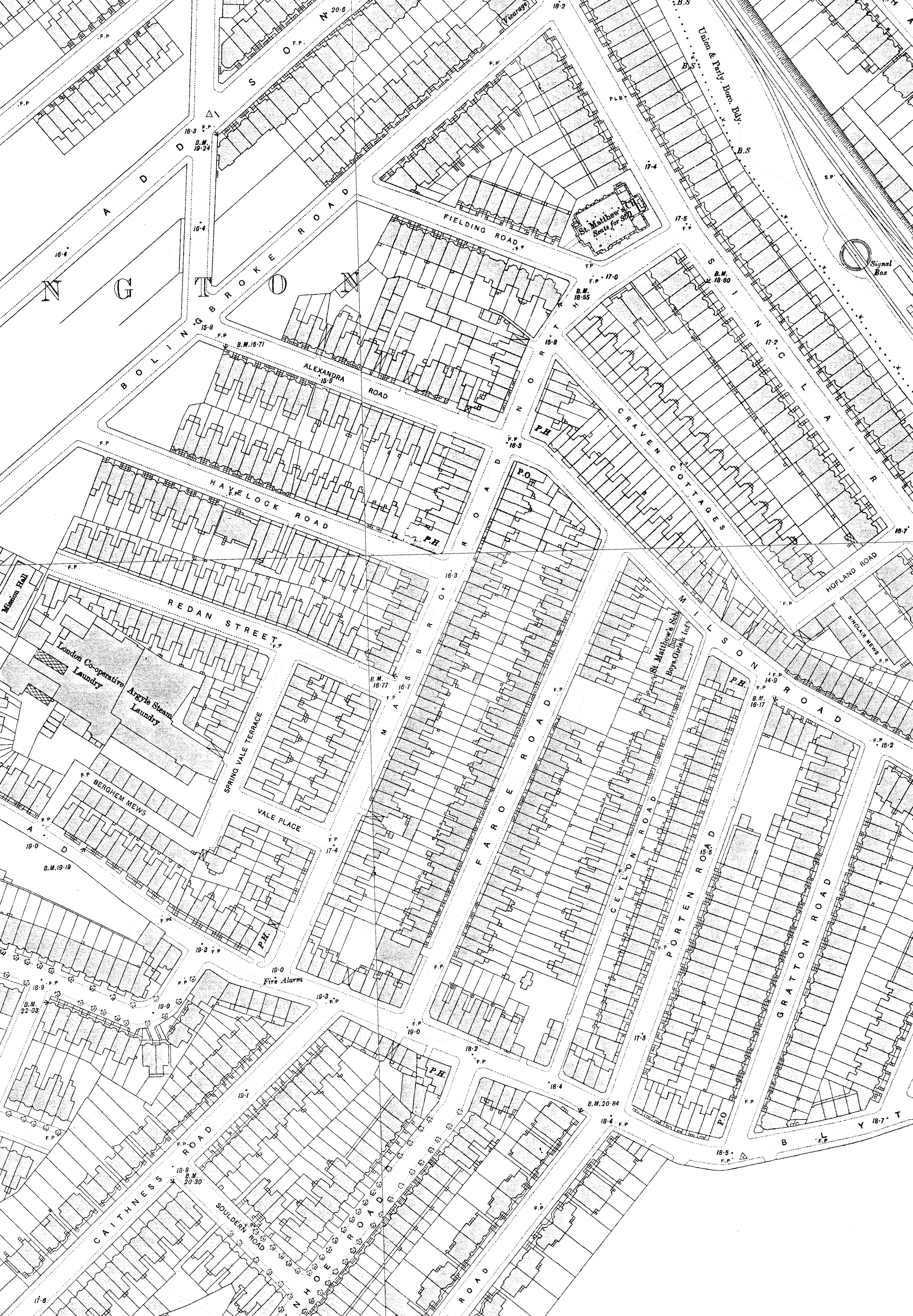
1895 Ordnance Survey map

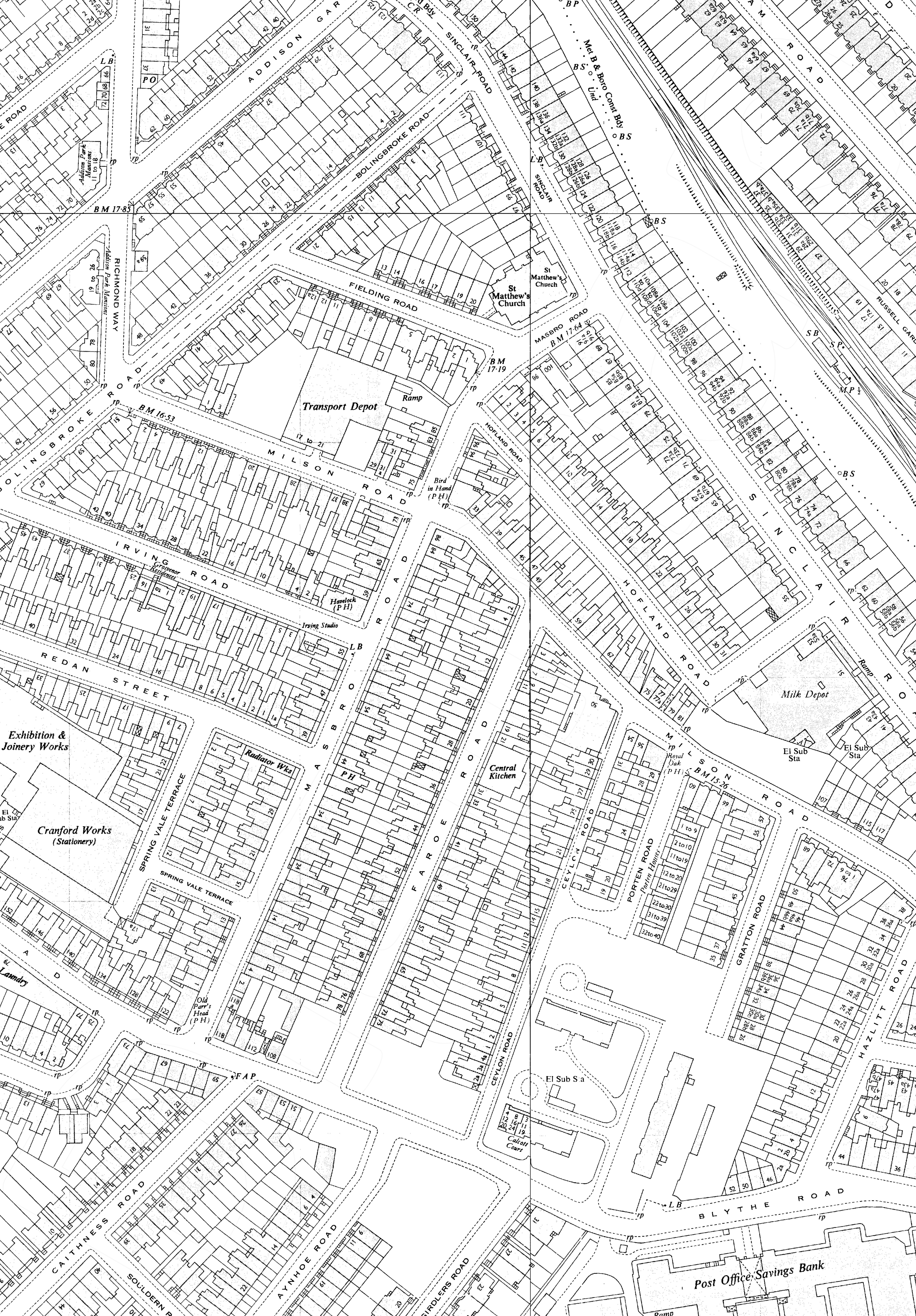
1953 Ordnance Survey map
