= King Edward Building =

Grade II* buildings in London, United States

Coordinates: 51.5164°N 0.0989°W

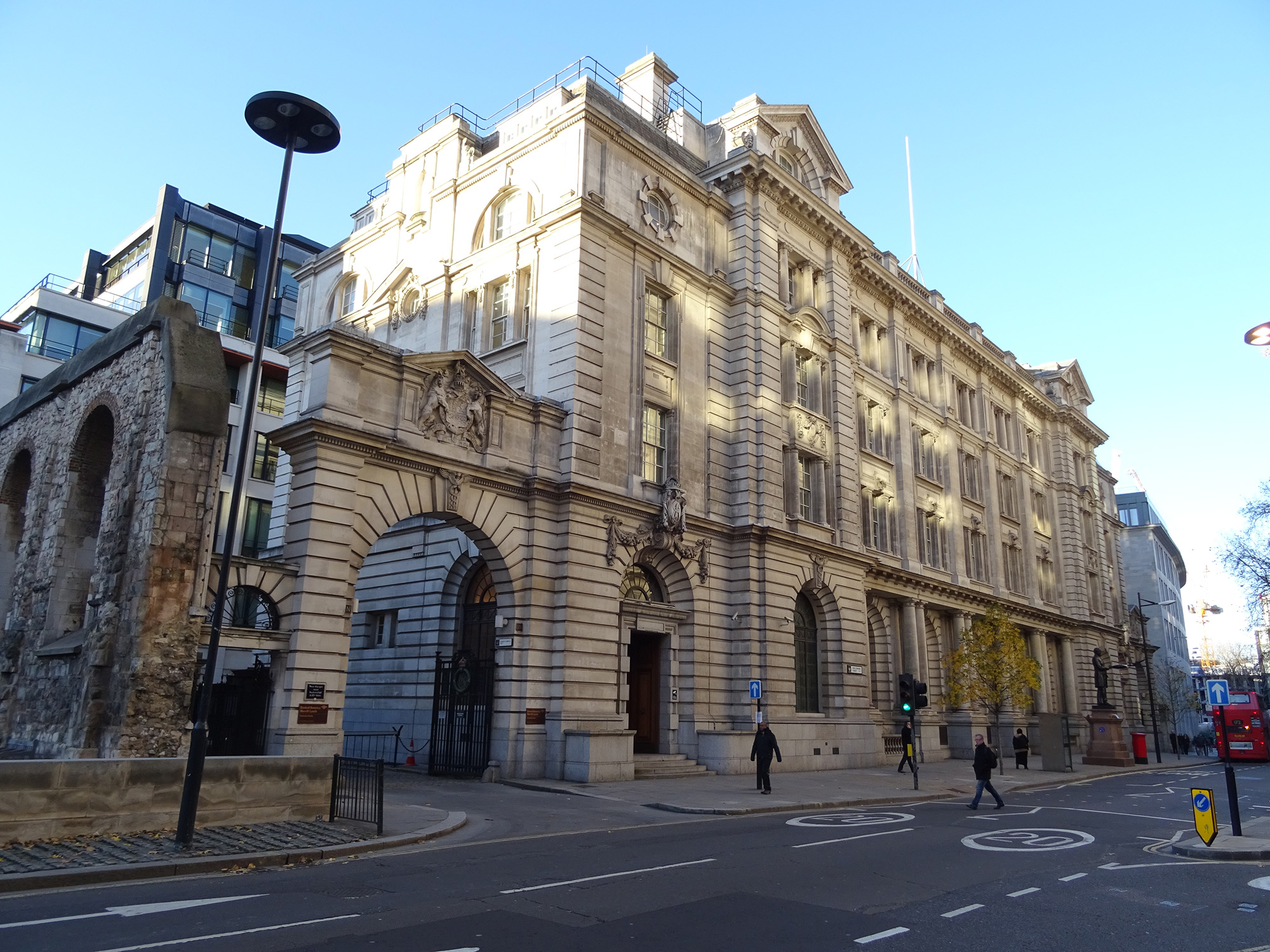
King Edward Building: the King Edward Street frontage in 2016

King Edward Building in the City of London was London's main Post Office for most of the 20th century and also the main sorting office for the London EC postal area and for overseas mail. Designed by Sir Henry Tanner, it was opened in 1910 and closed in the 1990s.

The complex had entrances on both King Edward Street and Newgate Street. The 'London Chief Office' on King Edward Street was the largest public post office in the UK.

== History ==
In 1905, King Edward VII laid the foundation stone of a new building for the General Post Office on King Edward Street. Standing opposite the Post Office Headquarters building, which had opened in 1895, King Edward Building was designed to take over the remaining functions of GPO East (the old Post Office headquarters on St. Martin's Le Grand). King Edward Building opened in 1910, after which GPO East was closed and subsequently demolished.

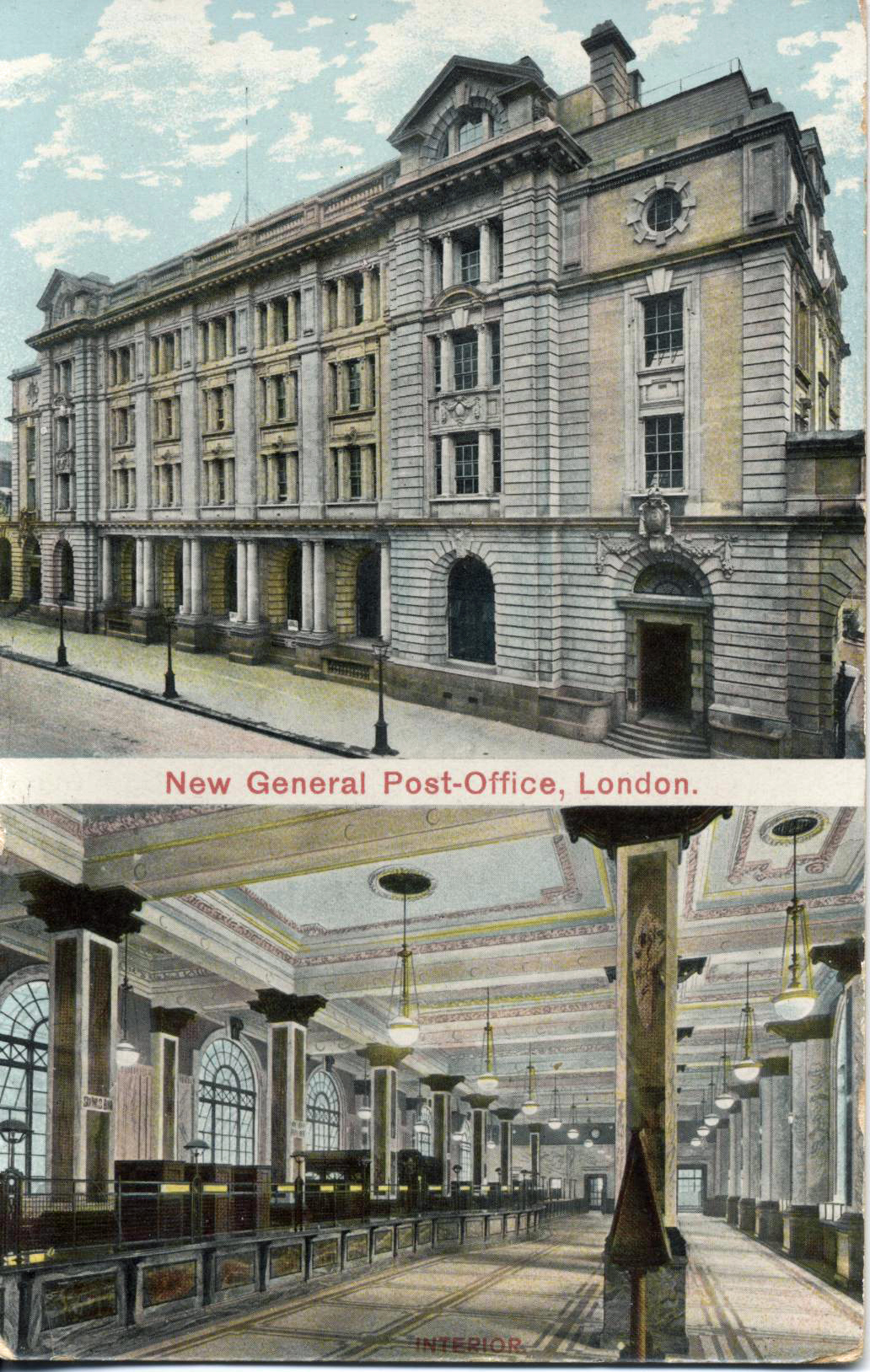
Exterior and interior of the new 'London Chief Office'

The King Edward Building complex was built on what had been the site of Christ's Hospital. It extended back over a considerable area (some 4.5 acres (1.8 ha) including yards and loading bays) from King Edward Street to Giltspur Street. The complex housed the main sorting offices for London (EC district) and for the GPO's Foreign Section, and also served as London's principal public post office. Behind the façade on King Edward Street, the main hall on the ground floor was 'lavishly decorated in marble and bronze' and contained a grand post office counter extending the full length of the room. The floors above were occupied by the offices of the Controller of the London Postal Service, while the basement contained the posting room, into which letters posted through slots in the wall above arrived via chutes, and departed (after preliminary sorting) via a system of conveyors.

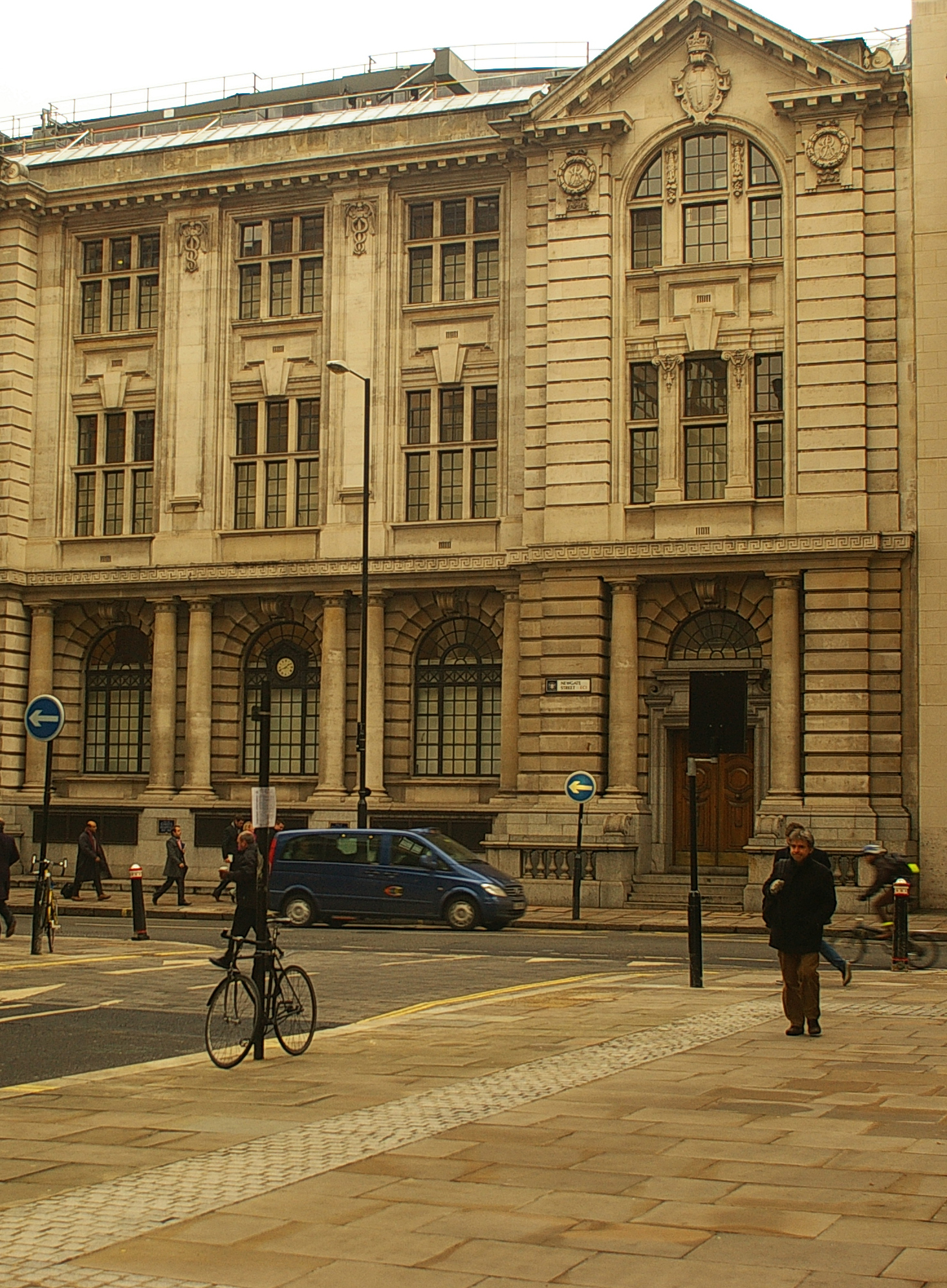
King Edward Building: the Newgate Street frontage

Behind the Chief Office on King Edward Street, and connected to it via bridges over loading and unloading yards, stood the large sorting office building (which was likewise designed by Tanner). EC district mail was sorted on the ground floor, and foreign/colonial correspondence on the first floor. In both cases, letters arrived at the east end of the building and progressed through it westwards. The sorting office had its main entrance on Newgate Street, similar in style to the building on King Edward Street. To the west of the sorting office was another yard, from which the mail was dispatched having been sorted into bags; beyond which space was left empty in anticipation of future expansion. (In the course of construction remains of the old London Wall, including a bastion, were discovered here; the bastion was preserved in situ).

Despite its Portland stone and granite facings, the King Edward Building was entirely constructed on the Hennebique system using reinforced concrete, and as such represents a very early example of the use of reinforced concrete for a major public building in the UK.

In 1923, a statue by Edward Onslow Ford of Sir Rowland Hill was set up outside the building on King Edward Street, having been moved from its original location by the Royal Exchange (where it had been erected in 1882). It is inscribed with the words 'He founded uniform penny postage - 1840'.

King Edward Building was one of the original stations on the Post Office Railway, which opened in 1927 to provide a subterranean mail transport link between several different district and sorting offices.

In 1966, the National Postal Museum was established in part of the King Edward Building, and an expanded museum was formally opened there by Queen Elizabeth II in 1969.

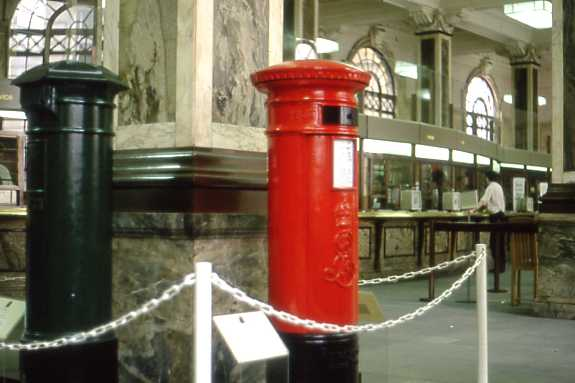
The main counter shortly before closure, in 1994.

The King Edward Building remained in use until the mid-1990s. For much of the century it had offered a counter service 24 hours a day, but it closed to the public in April 1994. For two years it continued to operate as the Royal Mail City and International Office, until July 1996 when these functions were transferred to Mount Pleasant Sorting Office; this left only the Postal Museum on site, until its closure two years later.

In 1997, the main King Edward Building was sold to Merrill for use as a London office. Both sections of the old King Edward's Building, the London Chief Office and the Sorting Office, are Grade II* listed buildings.

== See also ==
- General Post Office, London
