= Bull and Mouth Inn =

Former coaching inn in the City of London

Coordinates: 51.5164°N 0.0980°W

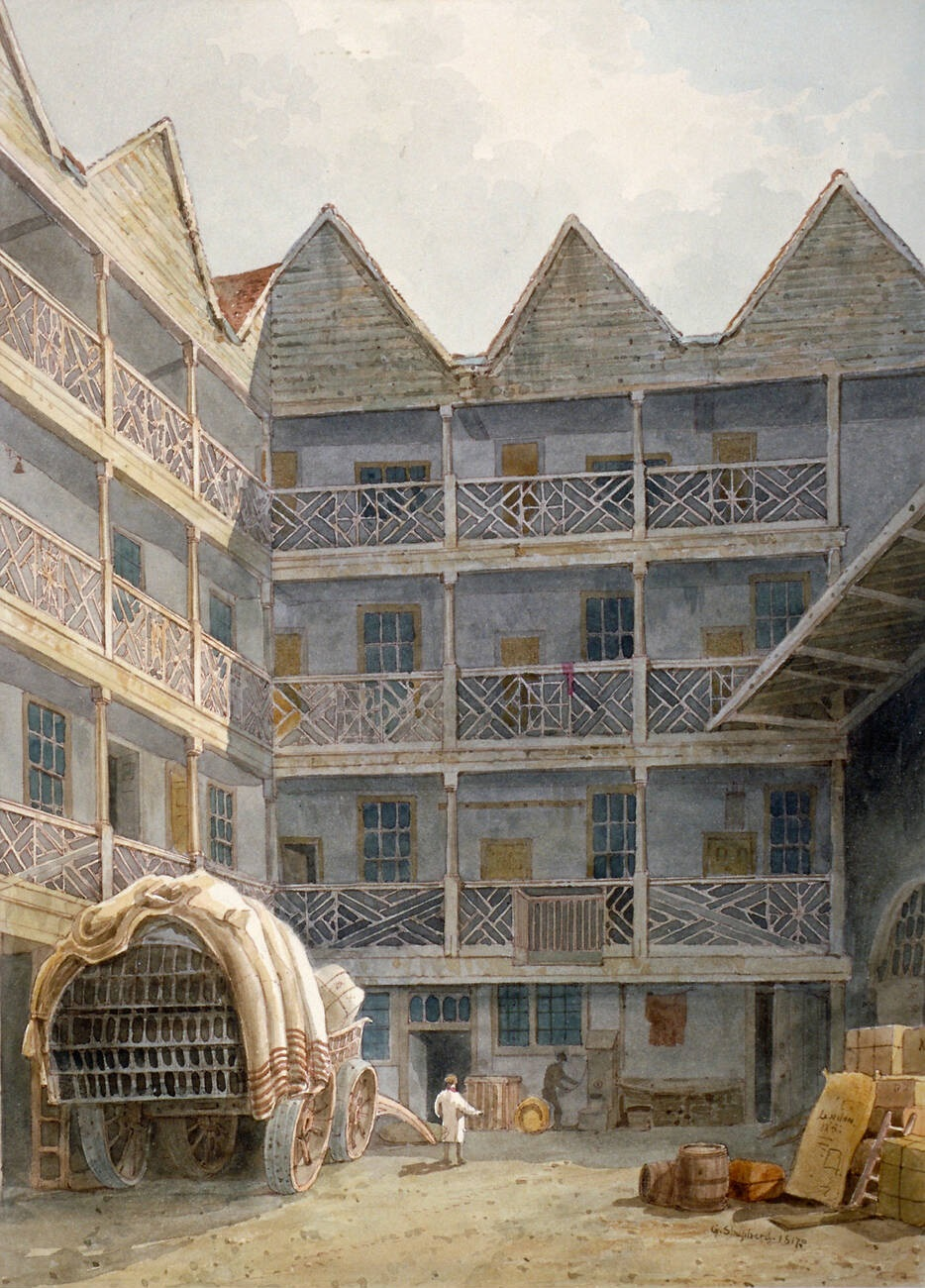
Yard at the Bull and Mouth Inn, St Martin's le Grand, City of London, 1817, by George Shepherd

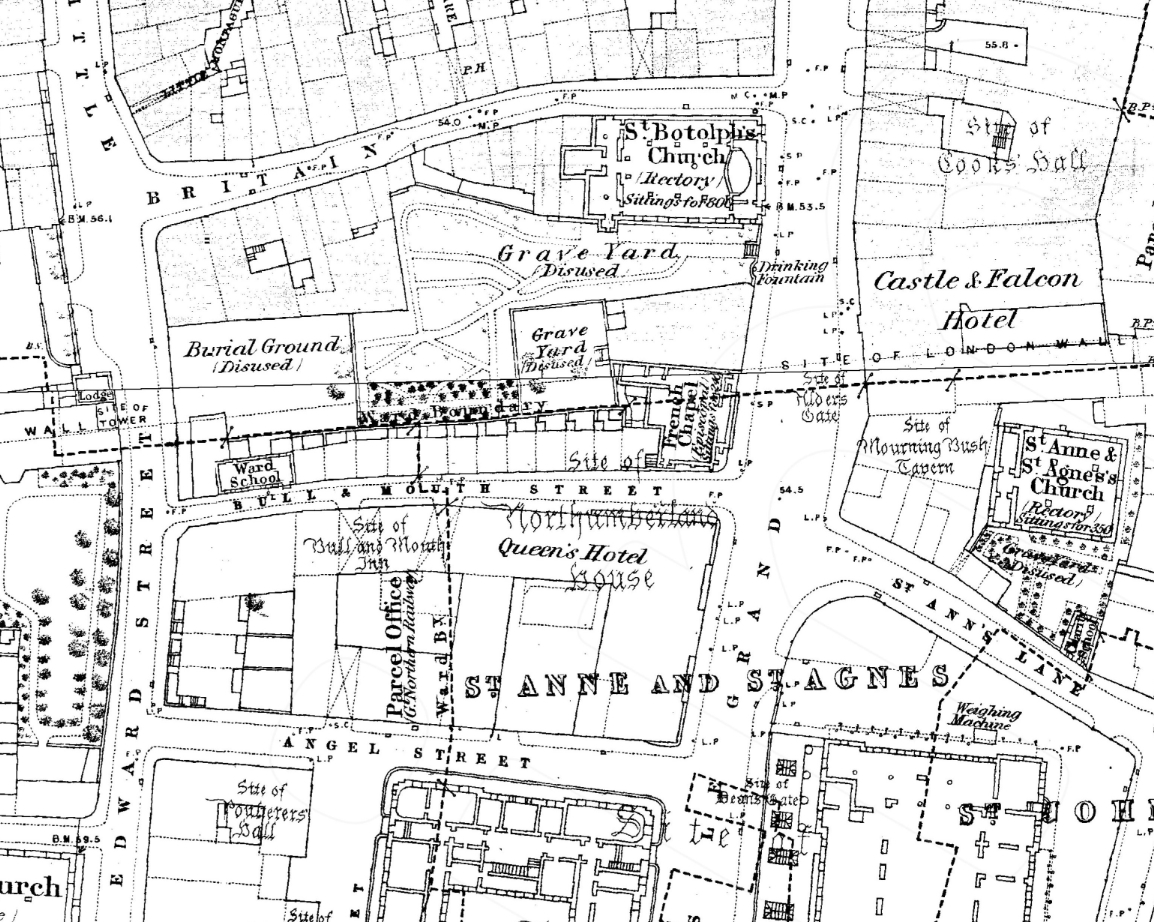
1875 Ordnance Survey map showing the location of the Queen's Hotel and the former Bull and Mouth Inn (italics)

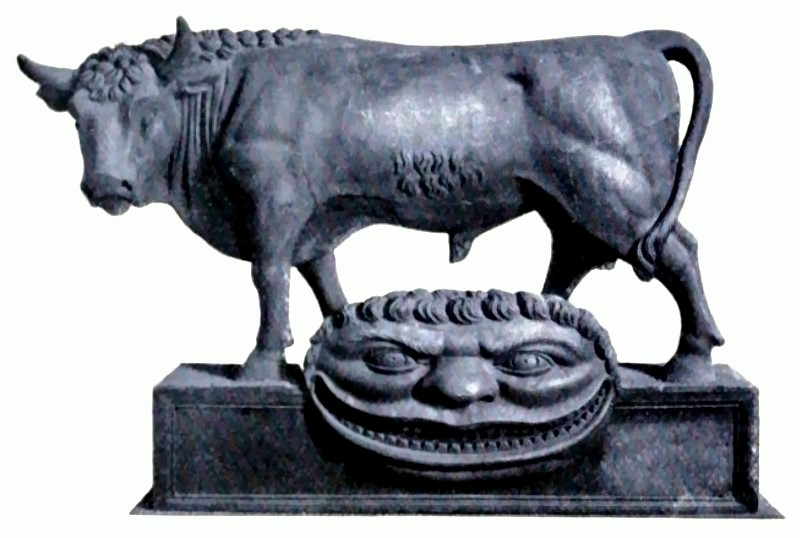
Sign of the Bull and Mouth Inn

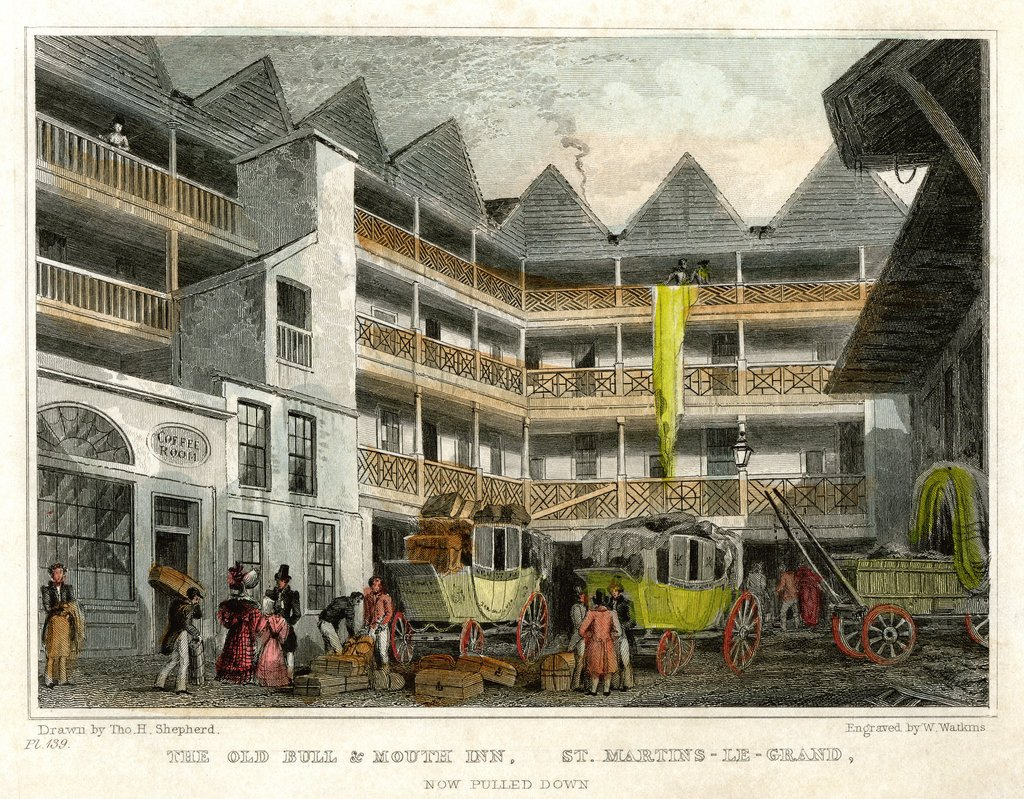
The Old Bull & Mouth Inn, St. Martin's-Le-Grand, engraved by W. Watkins, after Thomas Hosmer Shepherd

The Bull and Mouth Inn was a coaching inn in the City of London that dated from before the Great Fire of London in 1666. It was located between Bull and Mouth Street (now Postman's Park) in the north and Angel Street in the south. It was once an important arrival and departure point for coaches from all over Britain, but particularly for the north of England and Scotland. It became the Queen's Hotel in 1830 but was demolished in 1887 or 1888 when new post office buildings were built in St Martin's Le Grand.

== Origins ==
The original name of the inn was the Boulogne Mouth in reference to the town and harbor of Boulogne which was besieged by the English king Henry VIII in 1544–1546. Over time, the name became the Bull and Mouth. The inn building was destroyed in the Great Fire of London of 1666 but rebuilt. The street took its name from the inn and was first recorded on John Ogilby and William Morgan's Large Scale Map of the City As Rebuilt By 1676.

== Coach trade ==
The inn was an important arrival and departure point for coaches from all over England but particularly from the north and Scotland. It was near the General Post Office at St Martin's Le Grand, built 1829, which was the start of the mail coach route north along the Great North Road past the inn and along Aldersgate Street. In 1830, it was acquired by the coaching entrepreneur Edward Sherman and rebuilt as the Queen's Hotel at a cost of £60,000. The architect was James Savage. The hotel provided accommodation for passengers and underground stabling for 700 horses. Walter Thornbury described it in 1878 as "much affected by Manchester men".

It was painted by Thomas Hosmer Shepherd whose work was engraved by W. Watkins.

== Decline and legacy ==
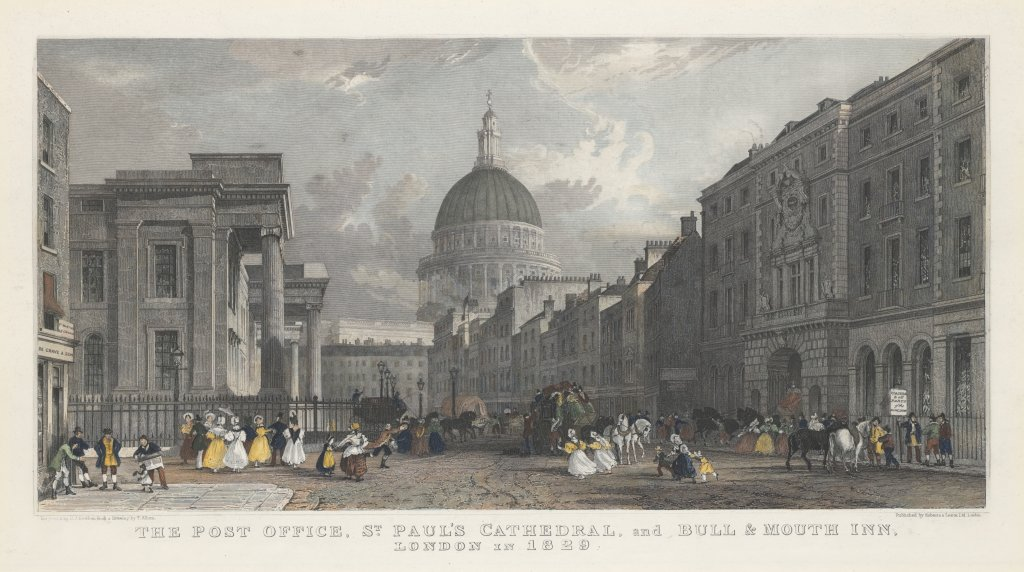
The Post Office, St. Paul's Cathedral, and Bull & Mouth Inn, London in 1829. Engraved by G.J. Emblem after Thomas Allom. St Martin's Le grand looking south, inn on the right.

The coaching business began to decline after the arrival of the railways in the mid-nineteenth century and by 1875 an Ordnance Survey map shows the south side of the inn in Angel Street as a Great Northern Railway parcel office. Walter Thornbury described it in 1878 as a luggage depot for the railway carriers Chaplin and Horne. The hotel was demolished in 1887 or 1888 and new post office buildings at 1 St Martin's Le Grand erected on the site in 1890–1895. A plaque on that building marks the approximate former location of the inn but in fact it was further west on the south side of Bull and Mouth Street, approximately where Postman's Park is now.

A terracotta statuette of a bull inside a gaping mouth, above which is the bust of King Edward VI and the arms of Christ's Hospital to which the ground belonged, once graced the front of the Queen's Hotel but has since been removed to the garden of the Museum of London at nearby London Wall. It bears the inscription:

Milo the Cretonian
An ox slew with his fist,
And ate it up at one meal,
Ye gods, what a glorious twist!

probably in reference to Milo of Croton, an ancient Greek wrestler and strongman sometimes depicted as carrying a bull on his shoulders. The inn's former sign, described by Historic England as "a striking Mannerist relief carving of a huge mouth swallowing an ox", was transferred to the Guildhall Museum and is now in the garden of the Museum of London. The museum also owns a wood and plaster sculpture of a bull above a grinning mouth, originally donated to the Guildhall Museum by Henry Cecil Raikes MP postmaster general, 1887.
