= W. H. Prior =

British painter and engraver

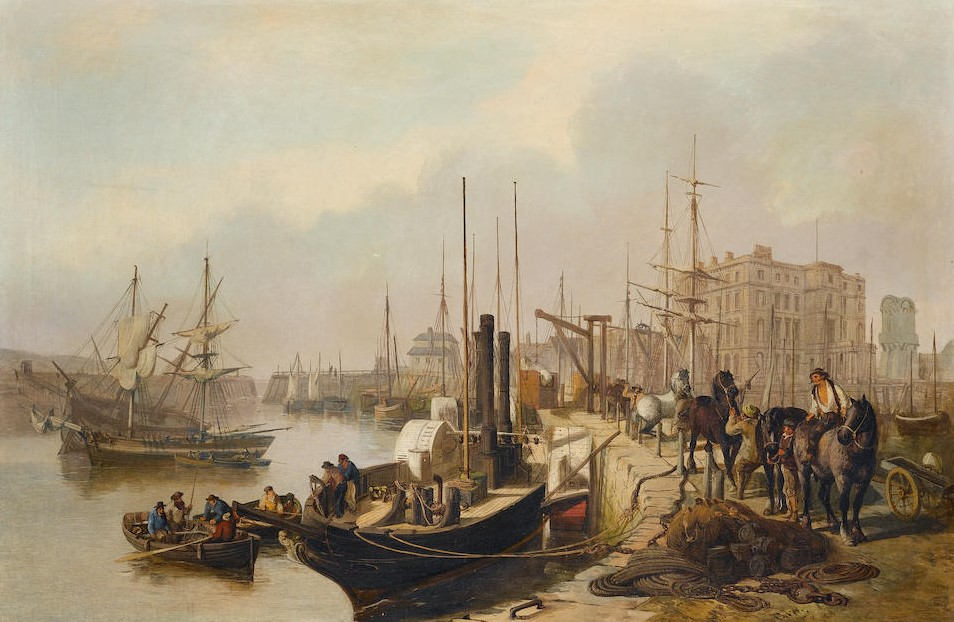
Dover Harbour in 1855, by W.H. Prior, oil on canvas.

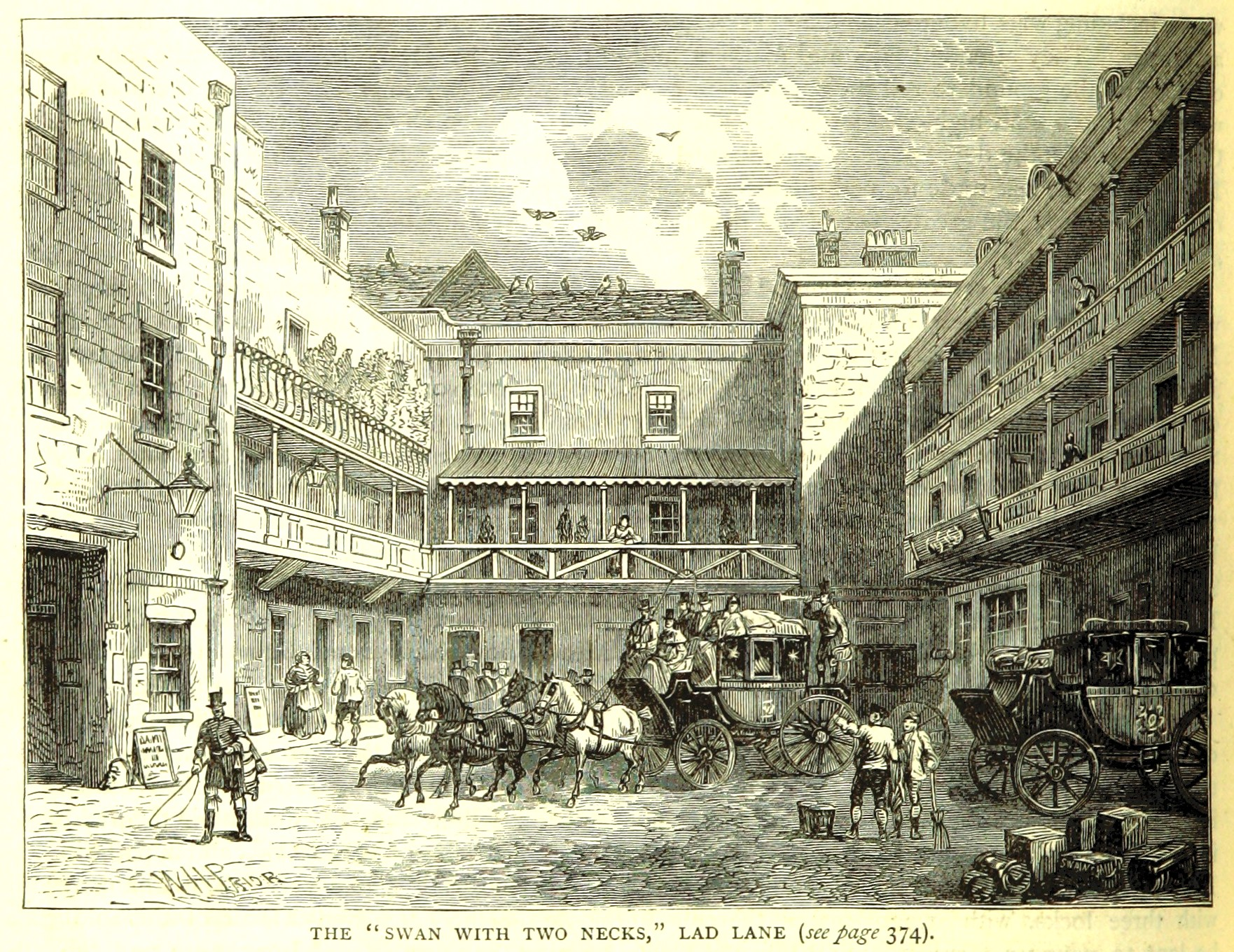
The Swan with Two Necks by W.H. Prior, Old and New London, Illustrated, Vol. 1 by Walter Thornbury.

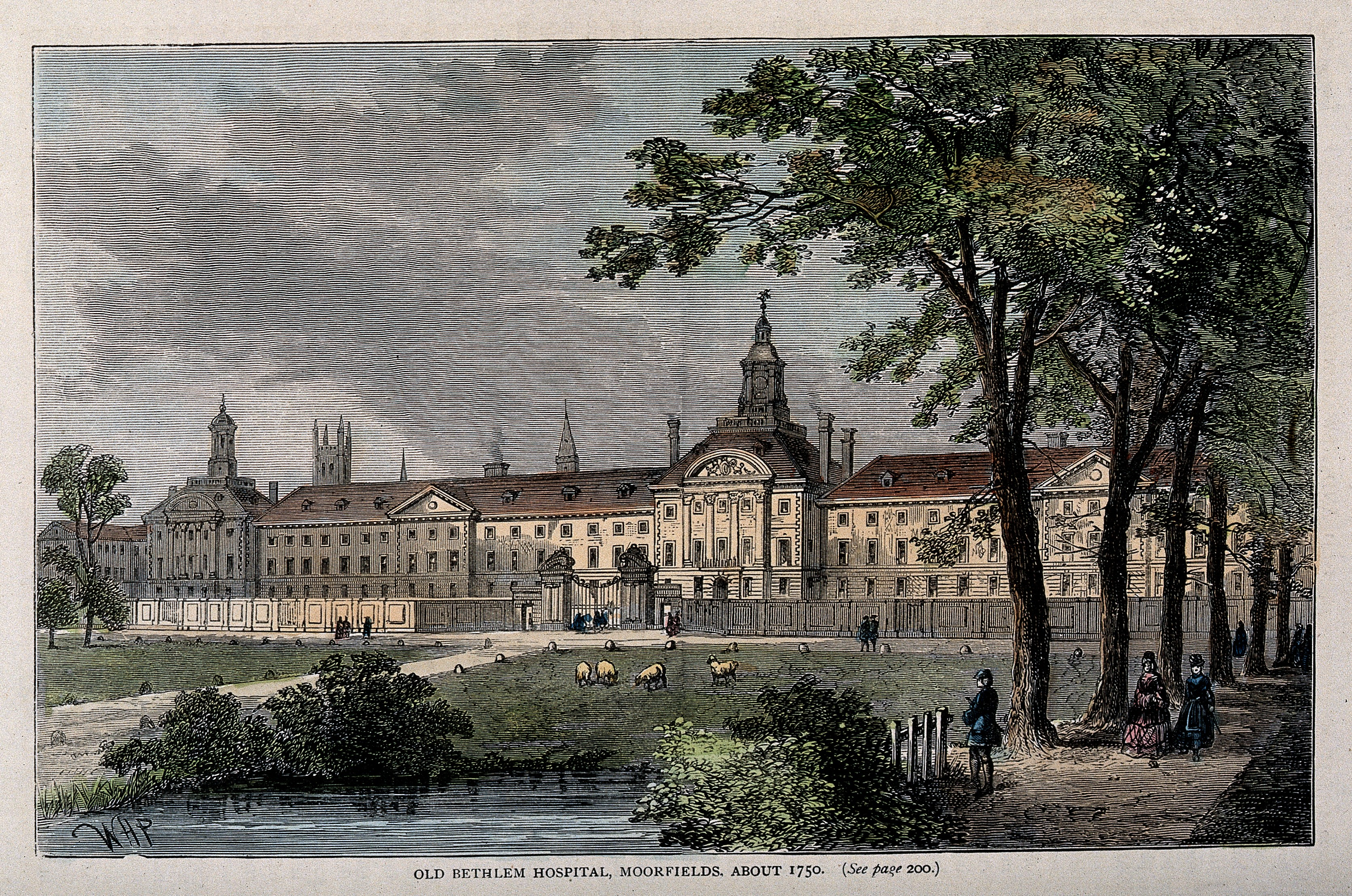
Old Bethlem Hospital, Moorfields, about 1750. Coloured wood engraving by W. H. Prior after an earlier engraving.

William Henry Prior (1812, in London – 23 February 1882, in London) was a British painter and engraver known for his depictions of London and its environs. He provided sketches for the Environs of London (1842), and worked for Charles Knight and Henry Vizetelly on the Illustrated Times.

== Early life and family ==
William Prior was born in Bloomsbury, London, in 1812. He married Amelia and they had two sons and two daughters. At the time of the 1871 census he was described as an Artist and living in Hammersmith. He was still there in 1881, noted as living in Masbro Road west.

== Career ==
Prior was a follower of Thomas Bewick's pupil William Harvey. He trained at Henry Vizetelly's (1820–1894) wood-engraving establishment with Francis Danby (landscape), W. H. Thwaites (figures), R. Hind (figures), and Martin, son of John Martin the painter (figures and portraits).

He provided sketches for the Environs of London which The Spectator in 1842 commended for their "vivid perception of those qualities that constitute their picturesqueness". Later, he worked for Charles Knight and Henry Vizetelly on the Illustrated Times (founded 1855).

== Death ==
Prior died at his home of 6 Nasbro Road (Masbro?), Brook Green, London, on 23 February 1882. His executor was his wife Amelia and he left an estate of £652.
