= Edward Sherman (coach proprietor) =

English businessman (1776–1866)

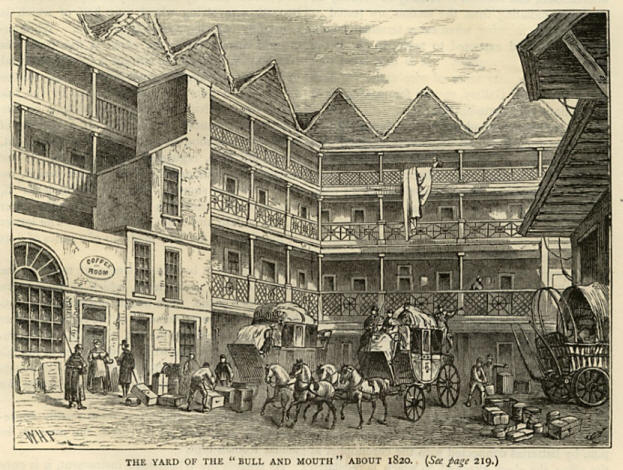
The Bull & Mouth Inn c. 1820 by W.H. Prior from Old and New London, Illustrated, Vol. 2, 1878, by Walter Thornbury.

Edward Sherman (1776 – 14 September 1866) was a stagecoach proprietor from Berkshire who became the second largest operator of stagecoaches in England after William Chaplin.

== Early life ==
The son of Edward Staniford [sic] Sherman, a farrier and smith, and Mary nee Sawyer, Edward Sherman was born at South Moreton in Berkshire (now Oxfordshire) in 1776.

In later life - 1863 - Sherman contributed £1,000 to the South Moreton Consolidated Charity, which still divides proceeds among the villagers at Christmastime.

Reportedly, an uncle he was living with boxed his ears and as a result in 1793 he made his way from Wantage to London where he gained a poor livelihood in Oxford Market. The market and other early work were abandoned for more lucrative employment. For some time prior to him becoming [c1803 onward] an innkeeper (he was granted Freedom of the City [London] as an Innholder 11 October 1803). and coach proprietor - he was closely connected with the Stock Exchange.

== Career ==
He became the second largest operator of stagecoaches in England after William Chaplin, retaining about 17,000 horses [at coaching inns along routes from London] and carrying on a business with an estimated turnover of over £500,000. Circa 1830 Sherman bought the Bull and Mouth Inn and rebuilt it as the Queens Hotel at a cost of £60,000. Sherman had known Lewis Levy, a financier of the City of London who farmed turnpike tolls with an annual income of half-a-million pounds, and was set up by Levy at The Bull and Mouth, St Martin's Le Grand.

With the coming of the railways, Sherman re-invested in this new industry. In July 1845 he travelled to Antwerp with other investors of the English company undertaking the construction of the Louvain [Leuven] to Jemappe-sur-Sambre new railway line and it was reported that he was to "reside in Belgium as the managing director of the railroad from Louvain [sic] to Jemappe" Authorisation for the concession for the construction of the Louvain and Jemeppe (sur Sambre) Railway was passed by the Chamber of Deputies, in Brussels, 2 May 1845

Sherman was also Chairman of the committee for the Southampton and Salisbury Junction Railway, and a Director of the Direct Northern Line Railway He was also [1845] on the committee for the Manchester and Birmingham Continuation and Welsh Junction Railway and the Remington's Line London and Manchester Direct Independent Railway, with a branch through the Staffordshire Potteries to Crewe Again in 1845, he was also, on the committee - with Lewis Levy - of the Kent and Essex Union Railway [connecting the southern end of Essex with Dover and the Continent, via Sheerness, Faversham and Canterbury, with a junction line to Herne Bay, Margate, Ramsgate and Deal]

== Personal life ==
Sherman is consistently stated to have "married three wealthy widows in quick succession". This is not the case. Sherman married twice and his first marriage lasted over forty years.

On 6 August 1803 witnessed by five people including Isabella Hunt, Joseph and Mary Hunt, and sisters Ann and Sobieskia Clementina Freanch, neighbours from Oxford Arms Passage, Sherman aged 27, married into the second generation of innholders at the Oxford Arms, Warwick Lane, Dowgate, City of London; marrying by Licence at St Martin, Ludgate, the widowed Ann Palmer nee Hunt, aged 49, innholder of the Oxford Arms, and daughter of its previous innholder.

Ann Palmer, nee Hunt, had previously married Benjamin Palmer in a Roman Catholic ceremony at the Sardinian Chapel, Lincoln Inn, 22 May 1779, witnessed by her father Thomas Hunt and aunt-in-law Margaret Hunt. Benjamin Palmer died in 1803 and was buried 18 May 1803 at Spa Fields, Islington

The Sardinian Chapel was also the location for the baptism of her niece Isabella who subsequently married Sherman.

In 1828 Sherman's widowed sister-in-law Margaret Hunt left her estate in her will, witnessed by Sherman, to her daughter Isabella Hunt.

Back in 1800 Isabella had also received a substantial legacy from her grandmother Ann Hunt Snr, the Oxford Arms innholder since 1769 when her husband took it over.

Sherman's first wife Ann died in 1847 aged 93. In 1849, witnessed by Edward Henry Sanderson, Sherman aged 73, secondly married her niece Isabella Hunt then aged 69.

Isabella survived Sherman by less than a year, dying 13 June 1867, at the Lindens, Effra Road, Brixton, Surrey, England the subsequent home of a son of Edward Henry Sanderson. During the course of him, as Isabella's executor, settling her probate in 1868, the Court of Probate ruled that as Isabella was the niece of Sherman's first wife, their marriage was invalid, and her estate was to be propounded as a single woman.

== Death ==
Sherman died at Manor Farm Asylum, Chiswick, Middlesex, on 14 September 1866. He had been admitted there on 1 April 1864, by his relatives due to his bouts of ill temper and some eccentricities. He was described as "late of the Oxford Arms Inn in the City of London". He left effects of less than £80,000 and his will was proved by Edward Henry Sanderson, gentleman, one of the executors, of Manor House, Clapham, Surrey. Sanderson was a former apprentice, and manager for Sherman of the Bull and Mouth Inn aka Queens Hotel.

Edward Sherman was buried at West Brompton cemetery Burial 46461 - in the same grave as his first wife Ann [re-interred from Newgate cemetery twenty years after her death in 1847, to be re-interred with Sherman in October 1866, a month after his death], and his second wife Isabella Sherman nee Hunt, who died in 1867. Afterwards Mary Sanderson on 12/11/1875, then her husband Edward Henry Sanderson on 22/Apr/1881, having retired to and died in Brighton, were also interred in the same plot.
