= Nomura House =

Victorian office block in London, England

Coordinates: 51.516384°N 0.097389°W

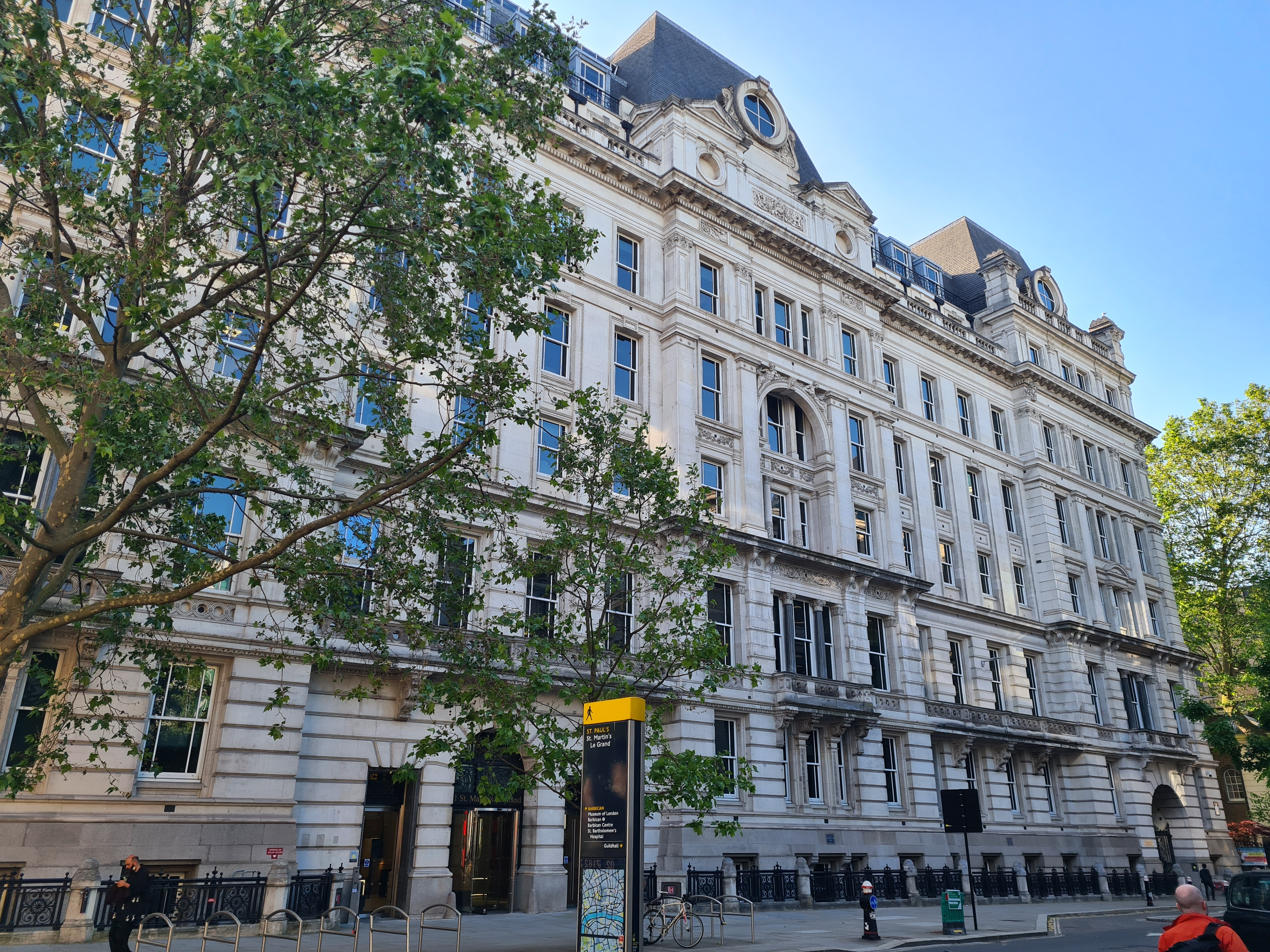
Nomura House

Nomura House at 1 St Martin's Le Grand and previously known as GPO North is a late Victorian office block that stands between St. Martin's Le Grand and King Edward Street in the City of London.

== History ==
=== GPO North ===
The building was devised as "GPO North", a new headquarters for the General Post Office and built between 1890 and 1895. To make way for its construction, Bull and Mouth Inn was cleared, where at one time the mail coaches had been harnessed to their horses ready to collect the mail from the Post Office across the road. There is a blue plaque for the inn on the building today. It was built at a cost of £222,000, and designed by Henry Tanner who would also design the King Edward Building, a sorting office for the GPO, across the road. The GPO continued to use the building as their headquarters until 1984.

=== Later use ===
The building remained used as offices following the GPO's departure. Shortly after, between 1987 and 1990, a full-scale refurbishment was undertaken by Fitzroy Robinson & Partners, subsequently renaming it to Nomura House. With the scale of the building, the retained facade was possibly the largest in Europe. In 2025, Orms were granted permission to once again redevelop the building. While the facade is to be kept, the mansard, an addition by Fitzroy Robinson, is to be removed.

== Design ==
The building is a large block on a mostly rectangular plot, however the St. Martin's le Grand facade is larger with three prominent towers. It is of an Italianate style, built in Portland stone. The outer arched entrances are topped with sculptural likenesses of two Postmasters General: H. C. Raikes (facing St Martin's Le Grand) and Arnold Morley (overlooking King Edward Street).
