= William Morgan (cartographer) =

William Morgan (died 1690) was a cartographer in England during the 17th century. He was the step-grandson of John Ogilby and, following Ogilby's death in 1676, carried on the cartographic publications that Ogilby had started, including "Britannia" and a large map of the City of London.

== Sources ==
- The A to Z of Restoration London, London Topographical Society Publication No. 145, 1992.
