= Newgate =

One of the historic seven gates of the London Wall around the City of London

Coordinates: 51°30′53.09″N 0°6′1.22″W

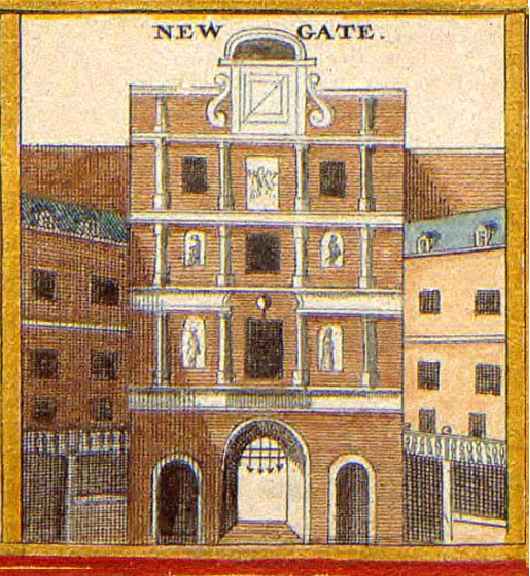
An old illustration of the gate, from a London map of 1690. (Note: The map is based on a Wenceslaus Hollar posthumous map of 1685.)

Newgate was one of the historic seven gates of the London Wall around the City of London and one of the six which date back to Roman times. Newgate lay on the west side of the wall and the road issuing from it headed over the River Fleet to Middlesex and western England. Beginning in the 12th century, parts of the gate buildings were used as a gaol, which later developed into Newgate Prison.

== Name ==
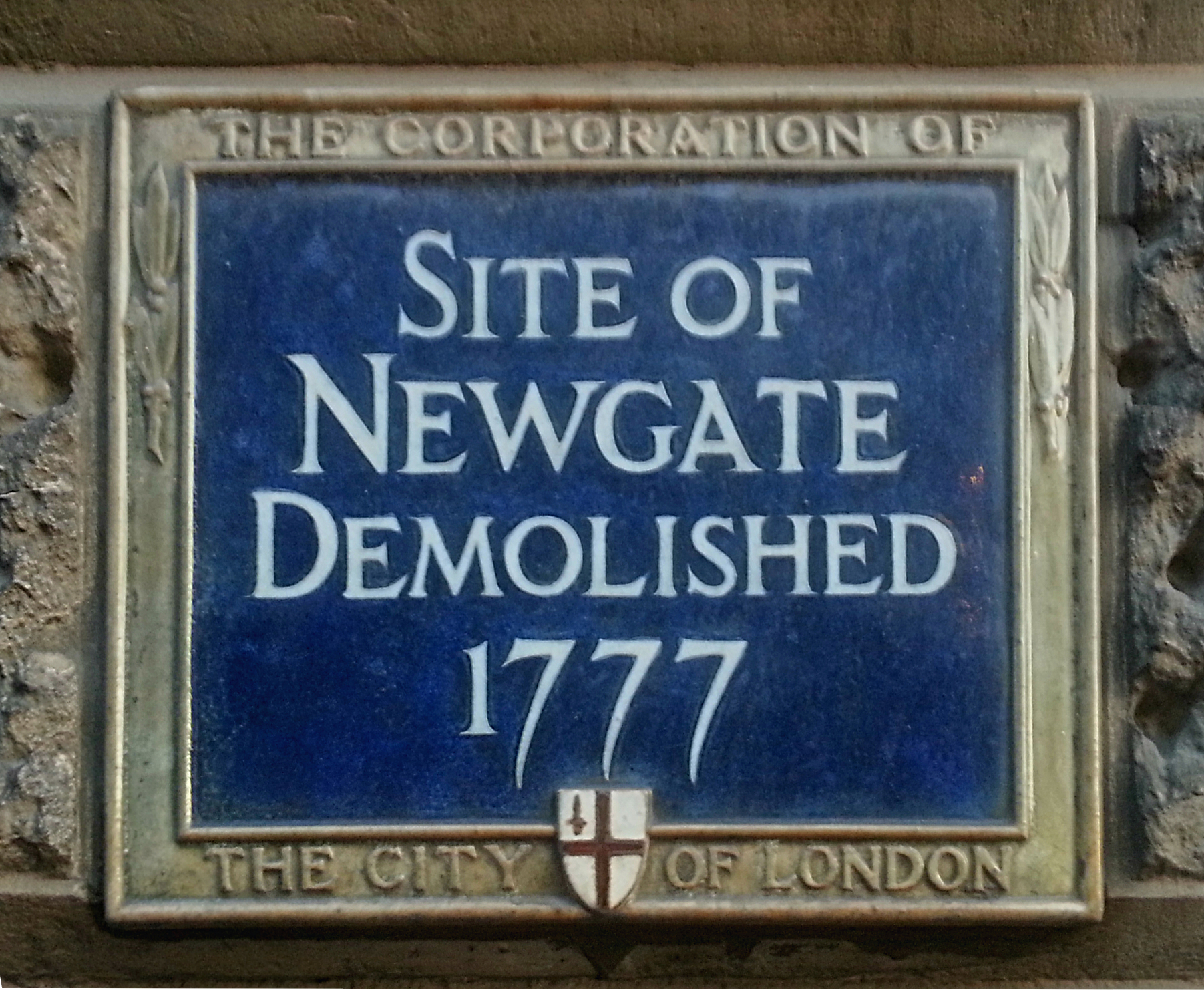
Blue plaque on the site of Newgate

It was once thought that Newgate was "New" since it was built after the Roman period, but archaeological evidence has shown that it was of Roman origin; it is therefore possible that the gate was named so when the Ludgate became less used, due to the building of the fourth St Paul's Cathedral in the early medieval period. It was previously known as Chamberlains Gate, there was a landholding referred to as the Chamberlain's Soke lying just outside Newgate, forming part of the ward of Farringdon Without.

== Structure and history ==
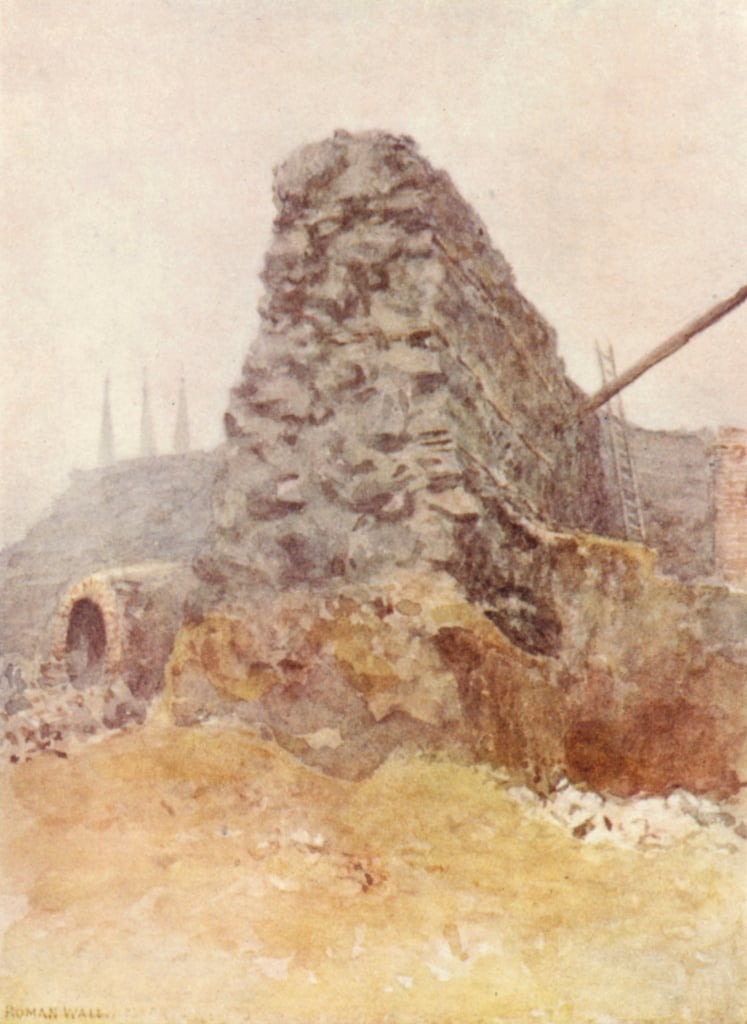
Remains of Roman Wall, Newgate, 1903 by Philip Norman

Excavations in 1875, 1903 and 1909 revealed the Roman structure and showed that it consisted of a double roadway between two square flanking guardroom towers.

From the 12th century, the gate was used as a prison for debtors and felons. Jack Cade was beheaded publicly in Newgate after the conclusion of his failed rebellion. The notorious Newgate Prison, was later extended to the south on the site of the modern Central Criminal Court on Old Bailey. The gate was demolished in 1767.

== Communications and surrounding area ==
Newgate Street, today part of the A40 London to Fishguard route, is mostly located within the city wall, leading west from Cheapside to the site of the old gate, and then continuing onto Holborn Viaduct at the point where the Old Bailey thoroughfare joins to the south and Giltspur Street to the north. A notable discovery here was a Roman tile inscribed with a disgruntled comment that "Austalis has been going off on his own for 13 days". The Roman road continued along High Holborn and Oxford Street, via the Devil's Highway to Silchester and Bath

To the north of the street are the public gardens around the ruins of Christ Church Greyfriars (bombed during World War II) on the site of a medieval Franciscan monastery. To the south is Paternoster Square leading towards St Paul's Cathedral.

== See also ==
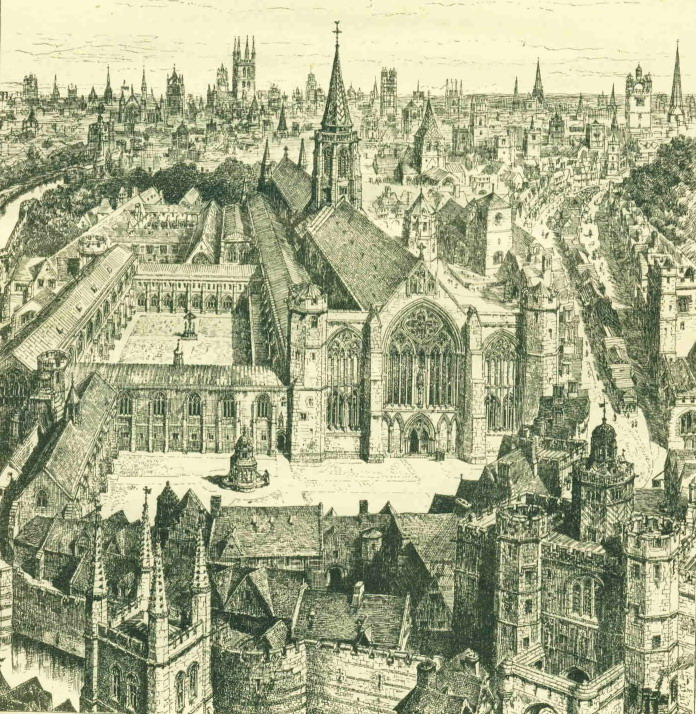
Newgate (lower right) from the west, 16th century

- Fortifications of London
- City gate
- Defensive wall
