= Penny Post =

Type of postal system

The Penny Post is any one of several postal systems in which normal letters could be sent for one penny. Five such schemes existed in the United Kingdom, while the United States initiated at least three such simple fixed rate postal arrangements.

== United Kingdom ==
=== London Penny Post ===
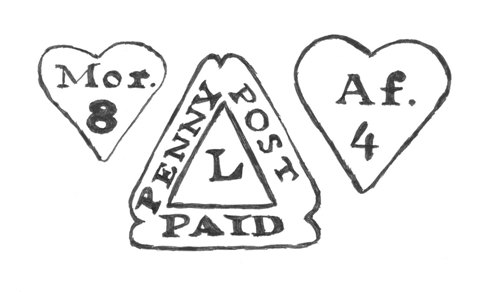
Postmark and time stamps from Lime Street office

In England, the postal service, from 1660 General Post Office, had developed into a monopoly, affirmed by Oliver Cromwell in 1654, for the collection and carriage of letters between post towns, however, there was no delivery system until William Dockwra and his partner Robert Murray established the London Penny Post in 1680. They set up a local post that used a uniform rate of one old penny for delivery of letters and packets weighing up to one pound within the cities of Westminster and London as well as in Southwark. Several deliveries took place a day within the city, and items were also delivered to addresses up to ten miles outside London for an extra charge of one penny. In 1683 Dockwra was forced to surrender the Penny Post to the English Crown for circulating what were considered seditious newsletters sharply criticizing the Duke of York, who was in charge of and directly benefited from the General Post Office.

=== Local Penny Post ===
In 1765, Parliament authorized the creation of Penny Posts in any town or city of the kingdoms of Great Britain and Ireland. The single postage rate of one penny was charged within the area, calculated by weight. By the beginning of the 19th century there were many of these, identifiable on covers, with markings such as "PP", "Py Post", or "Penny Post" along with the name of the town.

The early penny post system in Edinburgh, founded in 1773/4 by Peter Williamson, known as "Indian Peter," usefully combined it with one of the world's first street directories. He circulated mail to 17 shops in the city (effectively post offices) and employed four uniformed postmen. Their hats read "Penny Post" and were numbered 1, 4, 8 and 16 to make the business look bigger.

=== Uniform Penny Post ===
On 5 December 1839 the Uniform Fourpenny Post was introduced by the General Post Office but lasted only 36 days until 10 January 1840 when the Uniform Penny Post replaced it.

In 1835, Rowland Hill published a pamphlet entitled 'Post Office Reform' which led to various reforms and the introduction of the first postage stamp. He convinced Parliament to implement much needed reforms in the current postal system. On 10 January 1840, the Uniform Penny Post was established throughout Great Britain and Ireland, facilitating the safe, speedy and cheap conveyance of letters. Hill had demonstrated that the current system was inefficient and slow and not cost effective. Time was wasted when the postman waited at each house to collect payment. From 6 May 1840, letters could be prepaid with the first postage stamp, known as the Penny Black for up to a half ounce in weight, otherwise they would be charged twopence as unpaid letters or required additional postage. The use of prepaid postage through adhesive stamps revolutionized the postal service. While the Post Office was initially skeptical, the new system proved to be a resounding success, leading to greater efficiency, speed, and profitability. Around 1847, the English Postmaster General proposed to European governments that they join in a Europe-wide penny post system, though it is unclear what the responses received were; the same year, the penny post system was extended to Hong Kong.

=== Ocean Penny Post ===
Elihu Burritt proposed that a fixed rate of one penny be established for all mail throughout the entire British Empire as a means of facilitating international interaction and international unity. This was known as the Ocean Penny Post. (Note: See also League of Universal Brotherhood Pledge)

=== Imperial Penny Post ===
On Christmas Day, 1898, the Imperial Penny Post extended the rate throughout the British Empire except for Australia and New Zealand, who would not benefit from it until 1905. In 1908 it was extended to America.

The Penny Post rate ended in Great Britain in 1918.

== United States ==
In the United States, Spaulding's Penny Post operated in Buffalo, New York from 1847 to 1850.

Davis' Penny Post operated in Baltimore, Maryland for several weeks of February 1856, leaving behind a handful of rare stamps.

The Penny Post is the journal of the Carriers and Locals Society, and was also the original name of The Cincinnati Post.

== Sources ==
- Staff, Frank (1993). The Penny Post 1680-1918. The Lutterworth Press. ISBN 0-7188-2878-X.
- Golden, Catherine J. (2009). Posting It: The Victorian Revolution in Letter Writing. [University Press of Florida]. ISBN 978-0-8130-3379-2.
