= London Penny Post =

Premier postal system in London, England

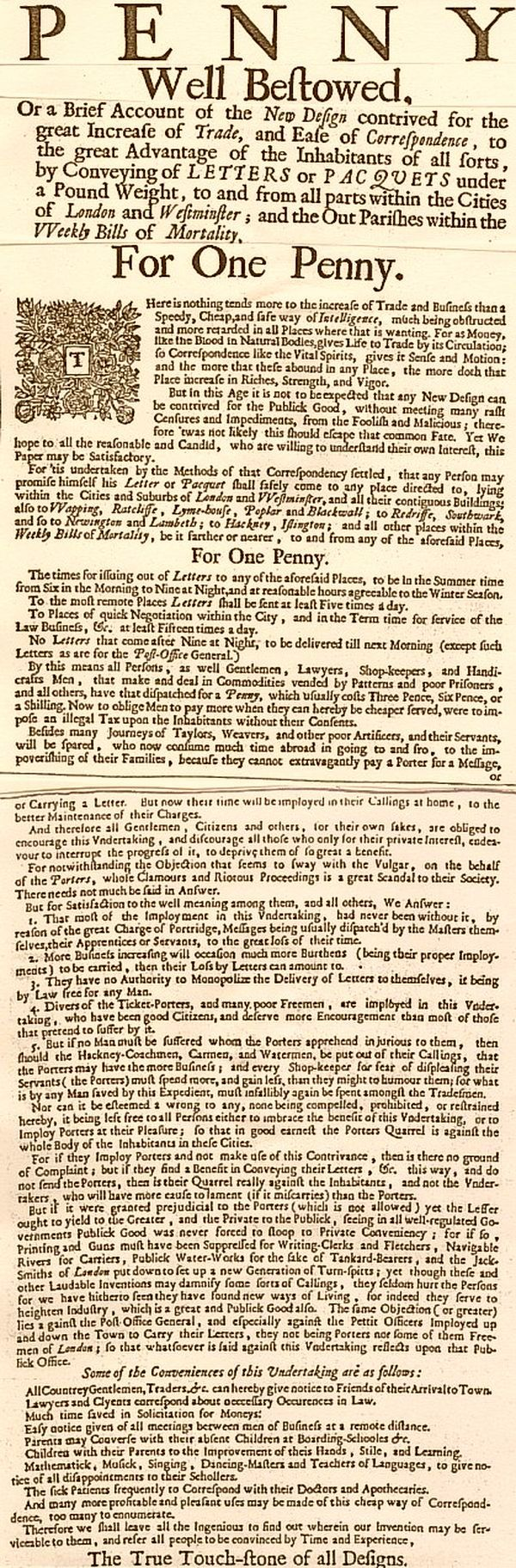
figure 1 Newspaper ad for Penny Post announcing service and postal rates and the advantages to trade and commerce which it offered.

The London Penny Post was a premier postal system whose function was to deliver mail within London and its immediate suburbs for the modest sum of one penny. The Penny Post was established in 1680 by William Dockwra, an English merchant, and his business partner, Robert Murray. Dockwra was a long standing member of the Armourers' and Brasiers' Livery Company, and was appointed a Customs Under-Searcher for the Port of London in 1663. Murray was a member of the Clothworkers' Company, and a clerk in the excise office.

The London Penny Post was the first postal system to use hand-stamps to postmark the mail to indicate the place and time of the mailing and that its postage had been prepaid; the earliest known Penny Post postmark is dated 13 December 1680.

With its cheap flat postage-rate of one penny, the London Penny Post quickly became a commercial success; however it compromised the business interests of the capital's porters and private couriers. It also threatened the interests of the Duke of York, who at that time profited directly from the General Post Office (which had been established by royal decree, some decades earlier, as a nationwide monopoly); this ultimately led to the takeover of the Penny Post by crown authorities in 1682.

Afterwards, the Penny Post (and its direct successor, the Twopenny Post) continued to operate as a distinct branch of the Post Office across London. It also provided a model system and pattern for the establishment of Penny Posts in Dublin and Edinburgh and a number of other cities in the 18th and 19th centuries. It remained in place until the mid-19th century, when (following the establishment of a UK-wide Uniform Penny Post) it was fully integrated into the workings of the General Post.

== Mail services in London, 1680 ==
Prior to the advent of the London Penny Post there was only one General Letter Office in London and Westminster to receive and deliver the mail that was bound for destinations outside London proper, but there was no system or provision for the general distribution of letters or parcels within the metropolis itself. With the growth of trade and the increase in the population of London (which had about half a million people at that time), there was an ever-increasing demand for a mail system that would serve London and its suburbs.

Dockwra and Murray's Penny Post would provide such a service. The new Penny Post service proved very useful to London's merchants and to other businesses, and very popular among the citizenry of London, who hitherto had to pay more expensive rates to private couriers and porters to deliver mail or small packages within the city.

== Premier postal system ==
The London Penny Post mail service was launched with weeks of publicity preceding it on 27 March 1680. To announce the new Penny Post, public notices were published in several local newspapers (figure 1) and notices and posters were also printed and circulated. They proclaimed the London Penny Post as a 'New Design, contrived for the great Increase of Trade and Ease of Correspondence [...] by Conveying of LETTERS or PACQUETS under a Pound Weight, to and from all parts within the Cities of London and Westminster, and the Out Parishes within the Weekly Bills of Mortality'. In order to achieve this, Dockwra, Murrey and their partners divided the area of the Bills (which stretched from Westminster to Blackwall, and from Hackney to Lambeth) into seven districts each with its own sorting office. They established a Head Office in the home of Dockwra himself, who was living in a mansion on Lime Street (formerly owned by Sir Robert Abdy).

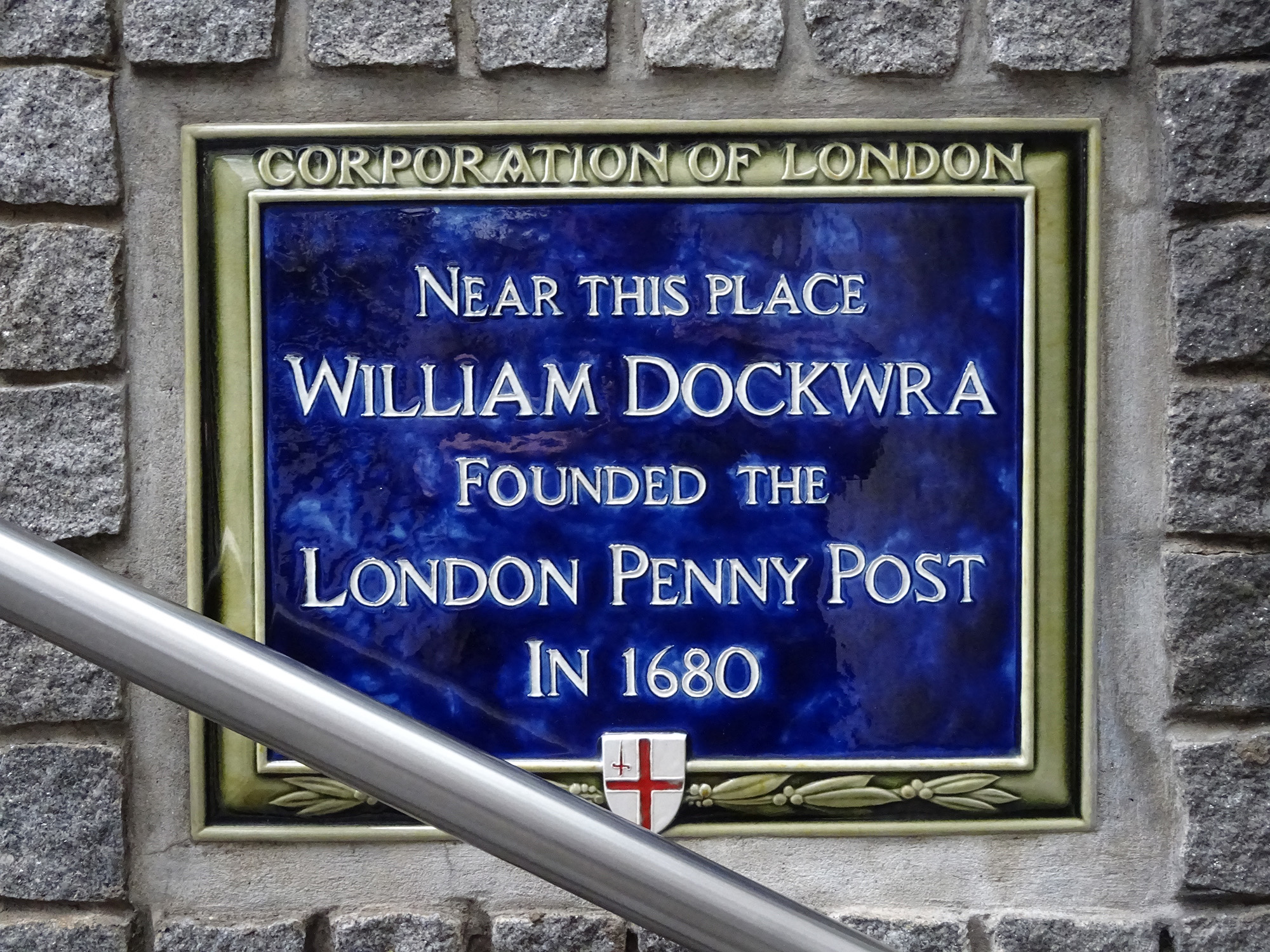
Dockwra plaque in Lime Street, London

Robert Murray, however, was arrested in May 1680, along with another associate of the Penny Post, George Cowdron, for distributing by means of the Penny Post what was considered to be seditious material criticising the Duke of York (afterwards James II). This left Dockwra to manage the Penny Post and as such credit is roundly given to him for its designs and further improvements as the Penny Post at that point having only been in operation for a couple of months was still in its developmental stages. Dockwra established hourly collections, with a maximum of ten deliveries daily for the city centre, a minimum of six deliveries for the suburbs and four for the outlying villages (such as Hackney and Islington). Dockwra's Penny Post delivered letters and packets weighing up to one pound and delivery was guaranteed within four hours, each letter being marked with a heart shaped time stamp indicating the time an item was dropped off for delivery.

Within two years the Penny Post had grown to such proportions that approximately four to five hundred receiving-houses and wall-boxes had been established at various locations about the city of London. Because the new postal service was affordable to the general public with its inexpensive flat rate of one penny it became an almost instant success and became the predecessor of the postal systems that later emerged and are still in use today in Great Britain and elsewhere today. Not all were in favour, however: many couriers and porters regarded the Penny Post as a threat to the delivery services they offered, and they sometimes resorted to assaulting the Post's messengers, tearing down advertisements and committing other acts of violence. There was also ongoing concern about the Whig party supporting the Penny Post and using it to distribute anti-Catholic and seditious newsletters (in an attempt to exclude the Duke of York, the future James II, from the succession to the throne on the grounds that he was Catholic); the Protestants denounced the concern as a design of the Duke of York and the Popish party.

== Postmarks ==
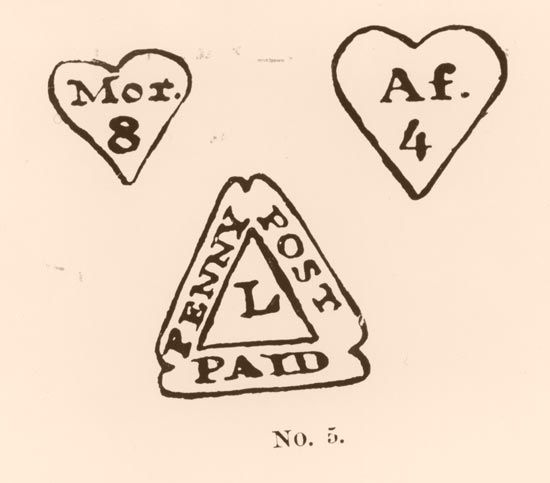
figure 2 Lime St. Postmark & heart-shaped Time-stamps

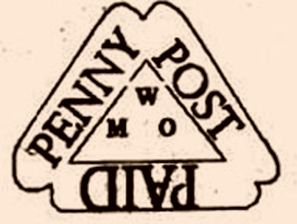
figure 3 Postmark used in 1681

When mail was submitted for delivery by the Penny Post the postage rate of one penny was charged and a hand-stamped postmark and time-stamp were applied to the mailed item confirming that its postage had been paid. The triangular postmarks used by Dockwra's Penny Post account for his fame among postal historians.

Four types of triangular postmarks were used to frank mail, (figure 4) but of the few that survive most are in museum archives, and only four are known to be in the hands of private collectors. The triangle-shaped postmark is considered by some historians and philatelists as the world's first postage stamp. Each Penny Post office had its own initial letter. The Penny Post also employed heart-shaped time stamps, one with the abbreviation 'Mor.' designating a morning mailing and one with 'Af.' indicating an afternoon mailing, along with the number of the hour i.e. a numeral '4' indicating a 4 o'clock mailing. (figure 2) The triangle postmarks used on letters in 1680 differ somewhat from later examples. The 1680 postmarks are larger, with the shortest side to the triangle at the base.

The postmarks on mailings in 1681 have triangles whose longest side is situated at the base and with the word PAID inscribed upside-down within the triangle. (figure 3) There also exist examples of postmarks where the word paid is spelled as PAYD. The initial letter was located within the triangle; 'L' for the London office, 'W' for Westminster, 'S' for the Saint Paul office, however there is speculation that the 'L' marking may have indicated a mailing from the office in Dockwra's home on Lime St.

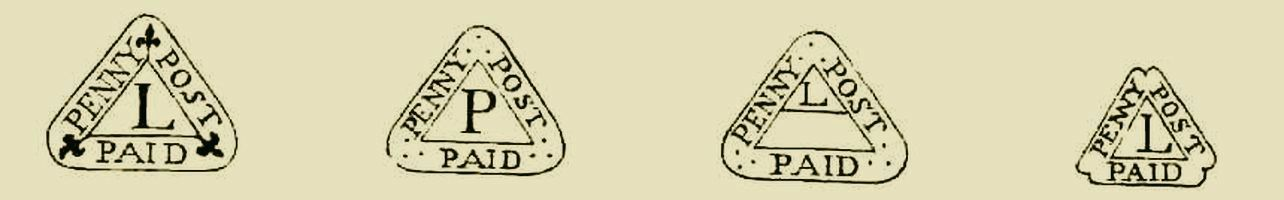
figure 4 ~ Postmarks used by the London Penny Post ~ In these examples the letters in the centre identified the office the mailed item was sent from. L = Lime Street and W = Westminster. In the original Dockwra triangular postmarks the words PENNY was always positioned on the left side, POST on the right side and PAID at the bottom, top outwards.

== Takeover of the Penny Post ==
Before the emergence of the Penny Post the profits of the existing General Post Office had been assigned by Parliament (in 1663) to the Duke of York, who now had similar designs on Dockwra's lucrative Penny Post, which in the space of two years had proved to be a great success and a potential new source of constant revenue. In 1683 a number of legal suits were brought; Dockwra was ruled to have infringed the Crown's postal monopoly, his enterprise was closed down and he was fined £100. Four days later the Duke of York announced the imminent launch of a new London District Post, which was Dockwra's Penny Post in all but name (and under new management). Dockwra eventually (but only after the Revolution of 1688) obtained a pension of £500 a year as compensation for his losses.

The London District Post thenceforward became a department of the General Post Office; however its operations and management remained entirely separate from those of the Inland Post, which covered the rest of the country (albeit the two sections co-operated where appropriate over dispatch and delivery of items - as indeed they had done in Dockwra's day). Each department retained its own team of letter-carriers, and they maintained separate networks of receiving houses across the capital. Notwithstanding the change of management, the London District Post continued to be known very generally as the 'Penny Post'.

The London District Post continued to operate from six principal offices, each located in a different geographical area. In 1684 they were in the following locations:

- The Chief Office was at Crosby House on Bishopsgate Street
- The St Paul's Office was on Newgate Street
- The Temple Office was in Chancery Lane
- The Westminster Office was near Charing Cross
- The Southwark Office was in Fowlane near the Borough
- The Hermitage Office was on Little Tower Hill, East Smithfield.

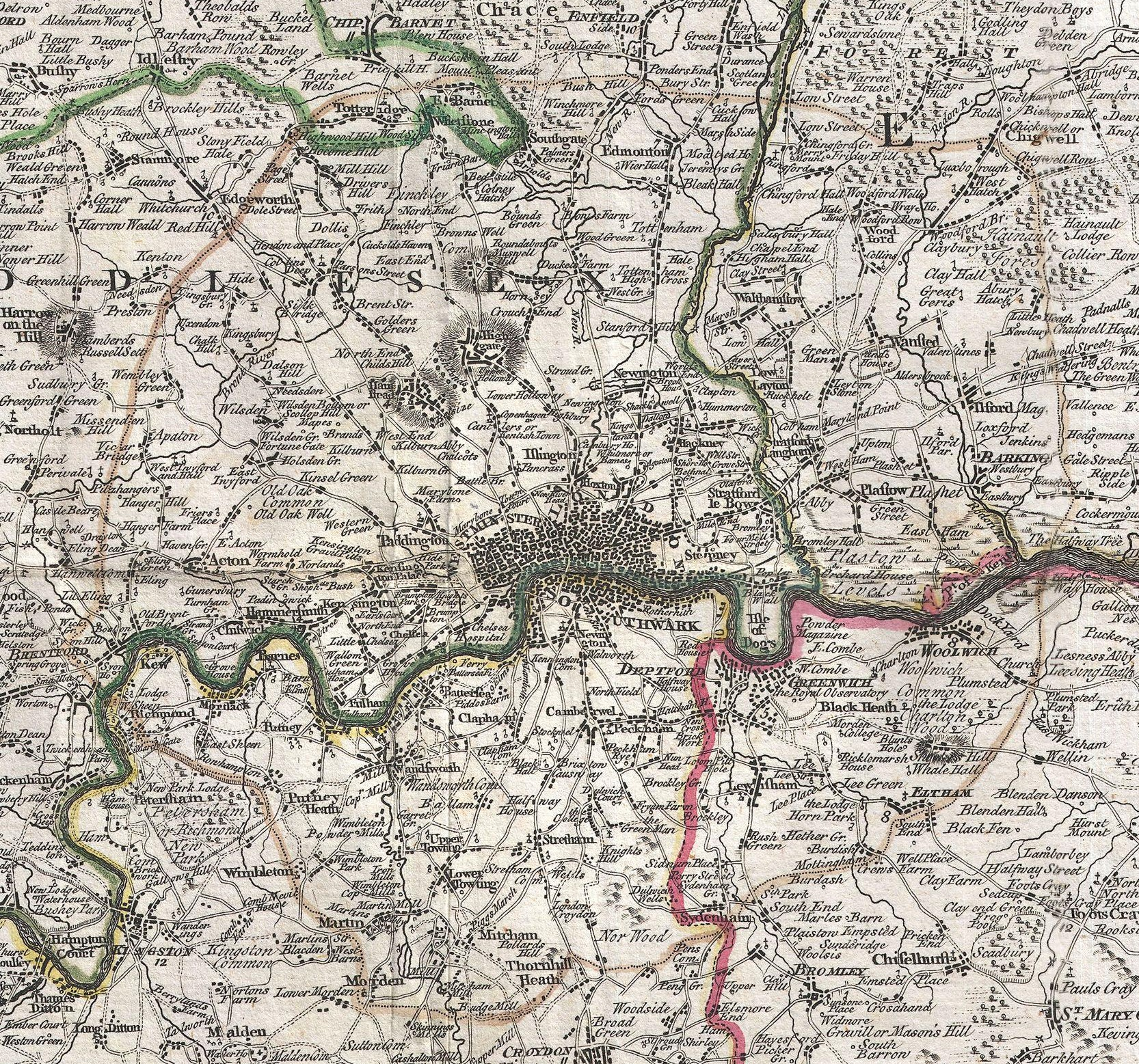
This 1773 map by Thomas Kitchin indicates the limit of the London Penny Post with a dotted line (edged orange).

The Post Office (Revenues) Act 1710 affirmed the fee 'for the port of all and every the letters and packets, passing or repassing by the carriage called the penny-post, established and settled within the cities of London and Westminster, and borough of Southwark, and parts adjacent, and to be received and delivered within ten English miles distant from the [...] general letter-office in London: one penny'.

Robert Seymour's Survey of London and Westminster, published in 1735, noted that there were more than 600 receiving houses for the Penny Post at that time, 'there being one in most great Streets'. They generally displayed a large-print sign at the door or window, reading 'Penny-Post Letters and Parcels are taken in here'. Letter-carriers called at the receiving houses every hour to collect items for the post, which were then taken to a principal office for sorting before being despatched from there for delivery.

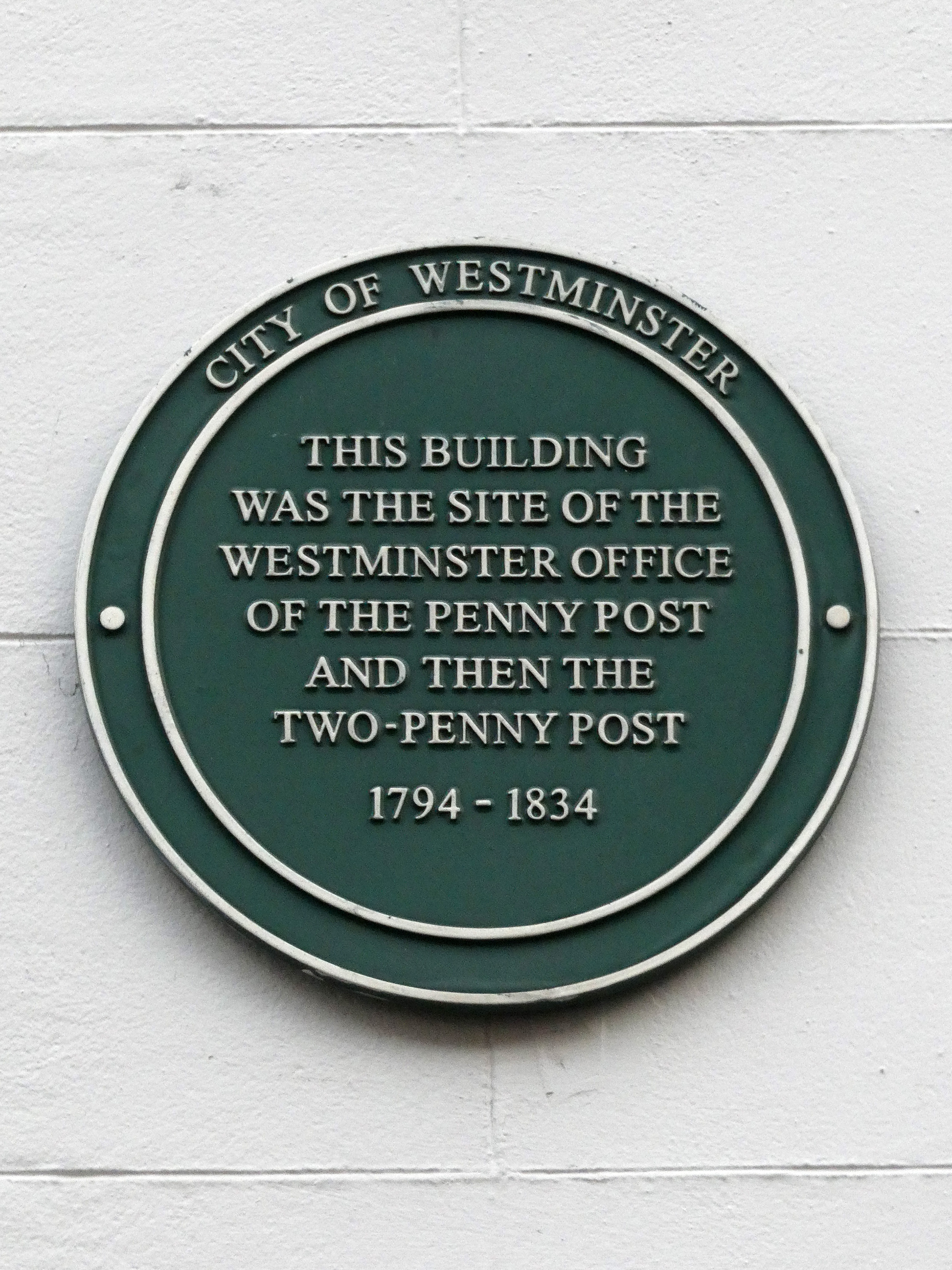
A green plaque marks the location of the former Westminster Office of the Penny Post in Gerrard Street.

The London District Post was reformed in 1794, whereupon the number of principal offices was reduced to two: the Chief Office, relocated to Abchurch Lane (adjacent to the General Letter Office in Lombard Street) and the Westminster Office, relocated to Gerrard Street in Soho; meanwhile the number of smaller receiving houses was increased, and the number of letter-carriers more than doubled.

In the course of the 18th century Penny Posts were established, on the model of London's, in other large cities: first in Dublin, in 1773, and then in Birmingham, Bristol, Edinburgh and Manchester (all in 1793). Previously Edinburgh had benefitted from a Penny Post service (since 1773) devised and run as a private enterprise by Peter Williamson. Later, Penny Posts were established in Glasgow, Liverpool and Newcastle.

=== Establishment of the Twopenny Post ===
The one penny London District postage rate remained in place for well over a century until 1801, whereupon it was doubled (and the service became known as the 'Twopenny Post'). Four years later a 3d rate was introduced for items to be conveyed to or from the suburban areas outside central London; this service was duly termed the 'Threepenny Post'. From 1829 the chief office of the London District (or 'Twopenny') Post was co-located with that of the Inland and Foreign Posts, within a new General Post Office building in St Martin's le Grand. Five years later the Westminster office in Gerrard Street closed, after which all Twopenny Post items went to St Martin's Le Grand for sorting.

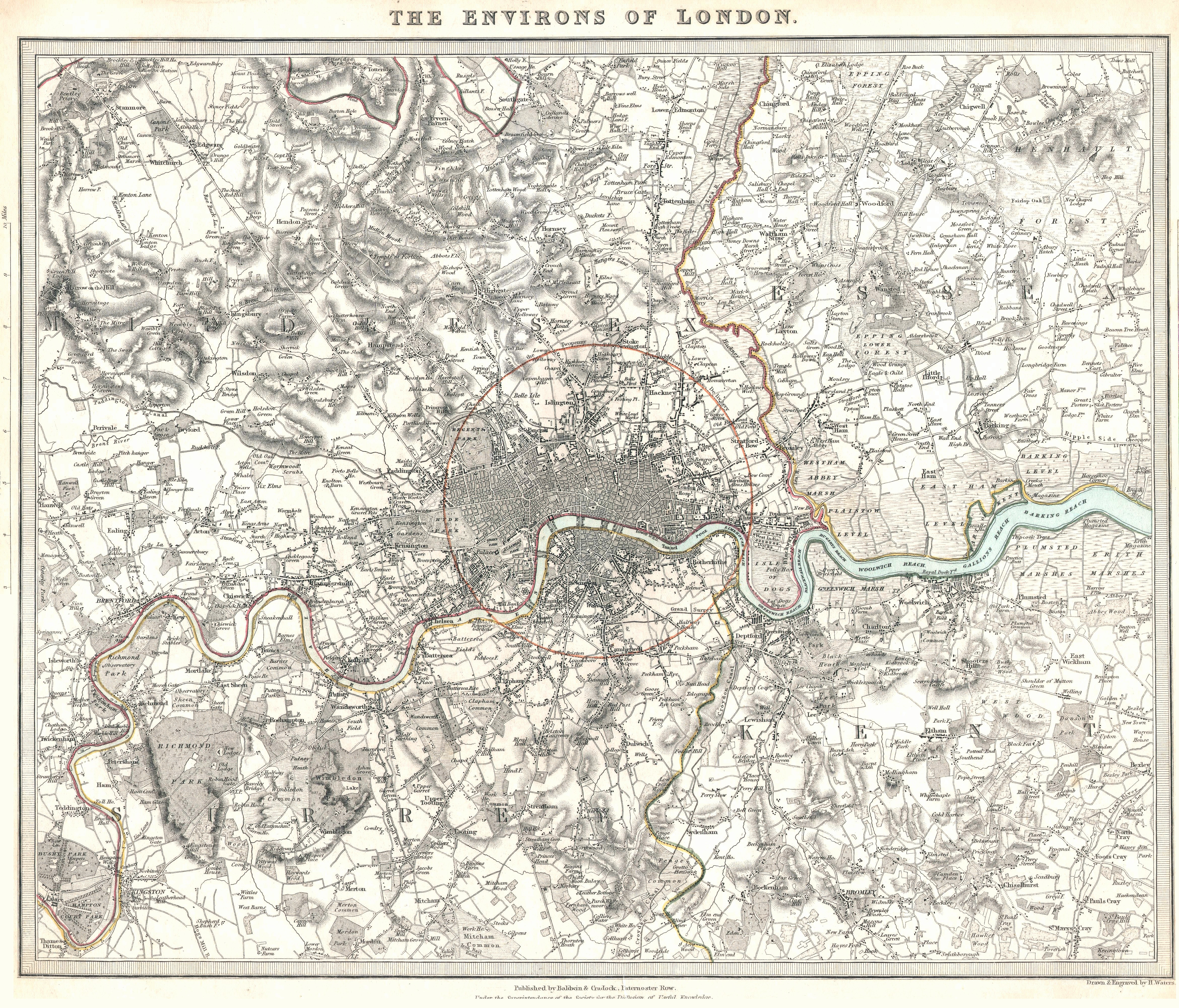
'The Environs of London' (1832). The central red circle shows the 'Extent of the Twopenny Post delivery'.

In 1831 the limit of the Twopenny Post area (which had formerly followed parish boundaries) was changed to represent a three-mile radius from the new General Post Office. Two years later the area of the Threepenny Post was extended to cover a twelve-mile radius (extending from the same location).

=== Amalgamation with the Inland Post ===
In 1837, Rowland Hill published a pamphlet entitled Post Office Reform, which led to the establishment in 1840 of a uniform penny postage rate for the whole of the United Kingdom. In the years that followed, moves were made toward the full amalgamation of the erstwhile Twopenny Post Office (formally renamed the London District Office in 1844) with the Inland Office; this was finally achieved in 1854, with the new combined office being designated the Circulation Department of the General Post Office. The following year, plans for a new London postal district were unveiled covering all addresses within a 12-mile radius of St Martin's Le Grand; this would be subdivided into ten areas (named after points of the compass) each with their own sorting office.

== See also ==
- Postage stamps and postal history of Great Britain
- Postal administration
- Penny Post
- Penny Black
