= Robert Murray (financier) =

English financier (1635–1725)

Robert Murray (1635 – 1725?) was an English financier, writer on commerce, and Whig conspirator. He is now remembered for his part in the first London Penny Post.

== Early life ==
Born in the Strand, London, he was son of Robert Murray, a tailor. In 1649 he was entered as an apprentice in the books of the Clothworkers' Company, and took up his freedom in 1660. He is subsequently spoken of as "milliner" and "uphosterer" but may have retired from trade when he was writing.

== The Penny Post of 1680 ==
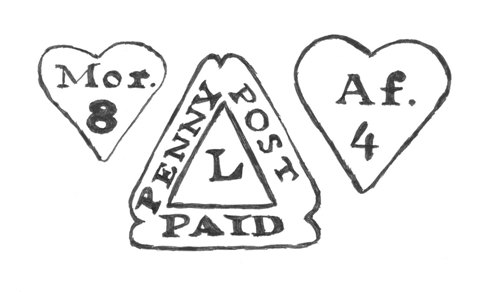
Penny Post stamps (1680–82)

It has been argued that the Penny Post's launch at the period of the exclusion crisis was no coincidence. It was announced on 22 March 1679 in the Mercurius Civicus, a Whig paper. It has been claimed that the opposition leader Lord Shaftesbury was a backer of the scheme, as he was of the paper.

Murray with William Dockwra opened for business with a penny post service on 27 March 1680. They offered to take letters "to any part of the City, or Suburbs", for a penny. Hugh Chamberlen and perhaps Henry Neville Payne were partners. The scheme was initially denounced by Titus Oates, because Payne who claimed a share in the concept was a Tory. But it was in fact taken up swiftly as a channel for distribution of anti-government writings. Coffee houses were used to pick up and drop posts.

Murray very shortly got into trouble connected with his support for the Duke of Monmouth. He then worked as an agent for Shaftesbury, and went to ground. He assigned his interest in the postal scheme to Dockwra; but later it was adjudged to pertain to James, Duke of York, as a branch of the general post office, by the King's Bench. Henry Bennet, 1st Earl of Arlington was brought in to run it in 1682, at the point when Shaftesbury went into self-imposed exile. The business itself thrived for a period.

== Whig agent and official ==
In July 1682 Murray was in contact with the Covenanter Alexander Gordon of Earlston. Gordon had come to London as a Covenanter representative; and Murray passed on plans for a putative uprising. He was in Paris in August 1682, meeting with Huguenot supporters of Shaftesbury. His French journey became known to Leoline Jenkins.

In the mid-1690s Murray was proposing a "land bank", an idea up in the air at the time and also promoted by Chamberlen and John Briscoe. His ideas for paying off the national debt over a decade, aided by a malt tax, attracted attention.

Murray became clerk to the general commissioners for the revenue of Ireland, and clerk to the commissioners of the grand excise of England. In August 1697 he had been active in the malt tax proposals in parliament, and was then in custody in a sponging house near St. Clement's Church. In 1703 he offered to the Lord High Treasurer a scheme for tin, and asked for the royal bounty.

== Later life ==
Some time before July 1720 a Robert Murray succeeded George Murray as comptroller and paymaster of the lottery of 1714, and had transactions with the South Sea Company. (There is some doubt raised about the identification, however.) Lotteries had been prohibited under William III and Mary II, but from 1709 onwards the government resorted to them as a means of raising money. In 1714 exchequer bills had been issued to the amount of £1,400,000 but lottery prizes were offered in addition to interest in the shape of annuities. In 1721, after a memorial from Murray, the South Sea Company proposed to discharge the unsubscribed orders into their own capital stock.

Murray was, however, superseded as paymaster of this lottery in 1724, and in February 1726 is spoken of as dead.

== Works ==
For several years from 1676 Murray wrote on matters of banking and national revenue. He published:

- A Proposal for the Advancement of Trade, London, 1676; proposed was establishment of a combined bank and Lombard or mont de piété for the issue of credit against "dead stock" deposited at 6 per cent.
- Composition Credit, or a Bank of Credit made Current by Common Consent in London more Useful than Money, London, 1682.
- An Account of the Constitution and Security of the General Bank of Credit, London, 1683.
- A Proposal for the more easy advancing to the Crown any fixed Sum of Money to carry on the War against France. A proposal to establish negotiable bills of credit on security of some branch of the royal revenue; Murray's credit bank proposals presage the scheme of John Law.
- A Proposal for the better securing our Wool against Exportation by working up and manufacturing such. A proposal to revive the law of the wool staple, and to establish a royal company of staplers.
- A Proposal for translating the Duty of Excise from Malt Drinks to Mast, whereby may be advanced to the Crown 15 Millions for the War against France.
- An Advertisement for the more Easy and Speedy Collecting of Debts. These last four publications are without place or date.

A Proposal for a National Bank (about 1696) suggested the Bank of Amsterdam as a model.

Murray is credited with developing an idea of Israel Tonge of copybooks for teaching children to read.

== Notes ==
Attribution

This article incorporates text from a publication now in the public domain: Shaw, William Arthur (1894). "Murray, Robert (1635-1725)". In Lee, Sidney (ed.). Dictionary of National Biography. Vol. 39. London: Smith, Elder & Co.
