= William Dockwra =

English merchant (1635–1716)

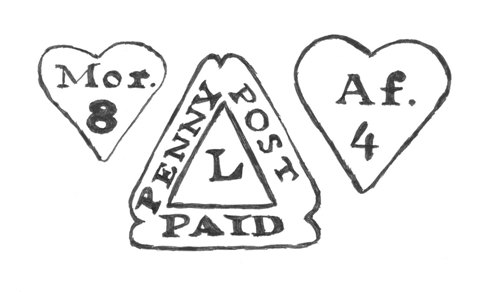
Examples of Dockwra's postmarks (1680–82)

William Dockwra (c. 1635–1716) was an English merchant who along with his partner Robert Murray created the first Penny Post in London in 1680. In latter 17th century London there was no official postal system for mail delivery within the city of London and its suburbs. Dockwra's London Penny Post was a mail delivery system that fulfilled this need. His system worked so well that it compromised the interests of private couriers and porters and royal officials alike.

== Early life ==
Dockwra was born in the City of London, the son of an armourer, and died in 1716. His date of birth is uncertain; however, records show him to have been baptised in 1635. He was the uncle of Mary Davies, whose dowry of Mayfair and other lands near London would make the Grosvenor family the richest family in England by the 19th century, and this connection was to prove beneficial to Dockwra's own fortunes.

Dockwra was apprenticed to one of his father's fellows in the Armourers' Company, but his career subsequently took a variety of turns. In the 1660s he obtained a position at the Custom House. By the 1670s, he was a merchant in the African slave trade, but he suffered major losses when a ship in which he had a large share was seized for breaching the Royal African Company's licensed monopoly, and in the 1680s he was involved in the development of Jersey in the United States, being appointed to the board of the East Jersey Board of Proprietors in 1683.

== The Penny Post ==
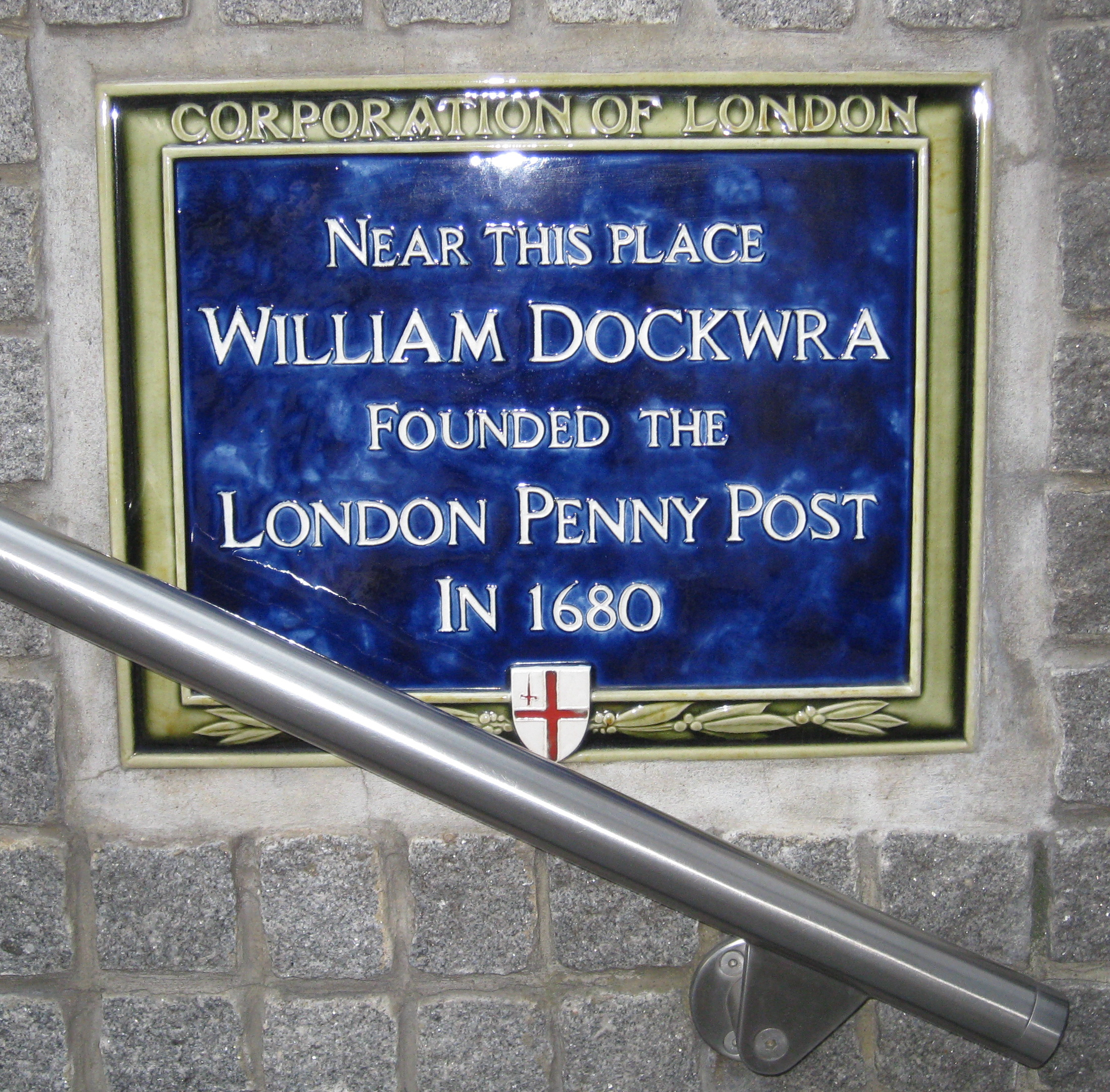
Plaque on Lime Street

On 1 April 1680, Dockwra established the first penny post, which served London and the surrounding area to a distance of ten miles. The service worked on the basis that the one penny postage was paid when the letter was accepted (a key element of Rowland Hill's 1839 reforms of the British postal system). Dockwra obtained a patent for his service, but unfortunately for him the profits from the government-operated General Post Office had been granted to the King's brother the Duke of York. Dockwra was required to surrender his patent and pay £2,000 in compensation. His fortunes improved after the Duke, by then King James II, was expelled from the country in 1688. In 1690, Dockwra was granted a pension of £500 a year (equivalent to £104,968 in 2025); then in 1697, he was appointed as comptroller of the penny post. He was dismissed in 1700, however, after an investigation into his conduct of the business, including complaints that he had moved the central office from Cornhill to a less convenient location and had opened and detained correspondence.

== Later life ==
Dockwra was appointed as the London agent for the sale of lead from the Grosvenor family's lead mines in Wales, and had become the senior partner in a brass smelting business based in Esher. This project introduced some technical innovations and helped to reduce England's dependence on imports, but it was not a financial success for Dockwra, who lost control of the business. He is believed to have been poor at his death.

== Publications ==
- A Penny Well Beſtowed. Or a Brief Account of the New Deſign contrived for the great Increaſe of Trade, and Eaſe of Correſpondence, to the great Advantage of the Inhabitants of all ſorts, by Conveying of LETTERS or PACQUETS under a Pound Weight, to and from all parts within the Cities of London and Weſtminſter; and the Out Pariſhes within the Weekly Bills of Mortality. Broadsheet published April 1680.
- The practical method of the penny-post. Being a sheet very necessary for all persons to have by them with an explanation of the following stamps for the marking of all letters. Pamphlet printed by George Larkin, London, 1681.

== See also ==
- London Penny Post
