= Jocosa Frankland =

English educational philanthropist (1531–1587)

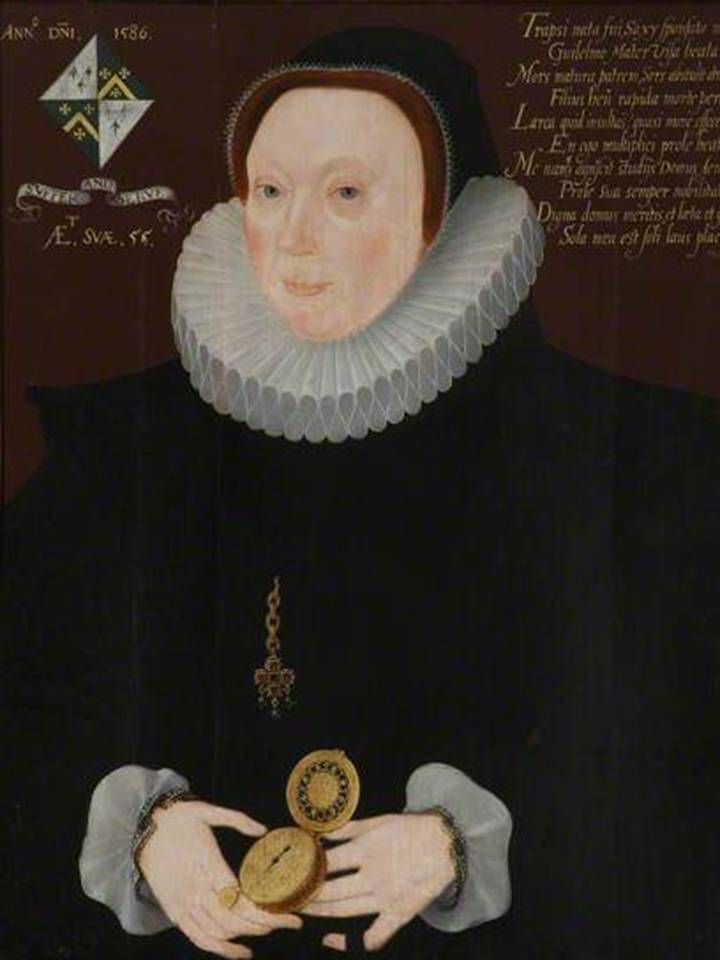
Portrait of Jocosa Frankland at Brasenose College, artist unknown (1586)

Jocosa or Joyce Frankland (1531–1587) was an English philanthropist.

== Life ==
Frankland was the daughter of Robert Trappes, a citizen and goldsmith of London, by his wife Joan. She was born in London in 1531. She married, first Henry Saxey, a "merchant venturer", and afterwards William Frankland of Rye House, Hertfordshire, whom she outlived. By her first husband she had an only son, William Saxey, a student of Gray's Inn, to whom she was greatly attached, and who died at Rye House 22 August 1581, aged 23. Jointly with him she had founded junior fellowships and scholarships at Gonville and Caius College and Emmanuel College, Cambridge, and after his death and that of her second husband, who was perhaps unsympathetic, she determined to devote her wealth to educational endowments, as the most congenial tribute to the memory of her son.

At Newport Ponds, Essex, she founded a free school (now known as Joyce Frankland Academy). To Lincoln College, Oxford, she gave £3 a year in augmentation of four scholarships founded by her mother, Joan Trappes, and to Brasenose College she left by her will, dated 20 Feb. 1586, both land and houses for the increase of the emoluments of the principal and fellows, and for the foundation of an additional fellowship, the holder of which was to be by preference a member of either the Trappes or Saxey families. She also provided maintenance for four scholars and a yearly stipend for an under-reader in logic and for a bible-clerk. In recognition of Jocosa Frankland's generosity her name was included in the "grace after meat" repeated daily in the college hall; and after her death, which occurred at Aldermanbury, London, 1587, the principals and fellows of Brasenose erected a monument to her memory in the church of St. Leonard's, Foster Lane, where she was buried. In the same church, which was destroyed in the Fire of London, her father's tomb bore the epitaph:

When the bells be merely (merrily) rung
And the Masse devoutly sung
And the meate merely eaten,
Then shall Robert Trappis, his wyffe, and his children be forgotten.

In the hall of Brasenose College is a portrait of Jocosa Frankland with some Latin verses inscribed, commencing:

Trapsi nata fui, Saxy sponsata marito,
Gulielmo mater visa beata meo.
Mors matura patrem, sors abstulit atra maritum;
Filius heu rapida morte peremptus obit.

The portrait was later engraved by Fittler. Another portrait is in the master's gallery in the Hall at Caius College.
