= Gone Too Soon (disambiguation) =

"Gone Too Soon" is a 1993 single by Michael Jackson.

Gone Too Soon may also refer to:

- Gone Too Soon (film), a 2010 documentary film about the final year of Michael Jackson's life and career
- Gone Too Soon (EP), a 2025 EP by Nettspend
- "Gone Too Soon" (Shakila Karim song), 2011
- "Gone Too Soon", a 2020 single by Andrew Jannakos
- "Gone Too Soon", a song by Daughtry, from the album Break the Spell, 2011
- "Gone Too Soon", a song by Scott Stapp, from the album The Space Between the Shadows, 2019
