= St Botolph's, Aldersgate =

Coordinates: 51°31′N 0°6′W

- St Botolph without Aldersgate
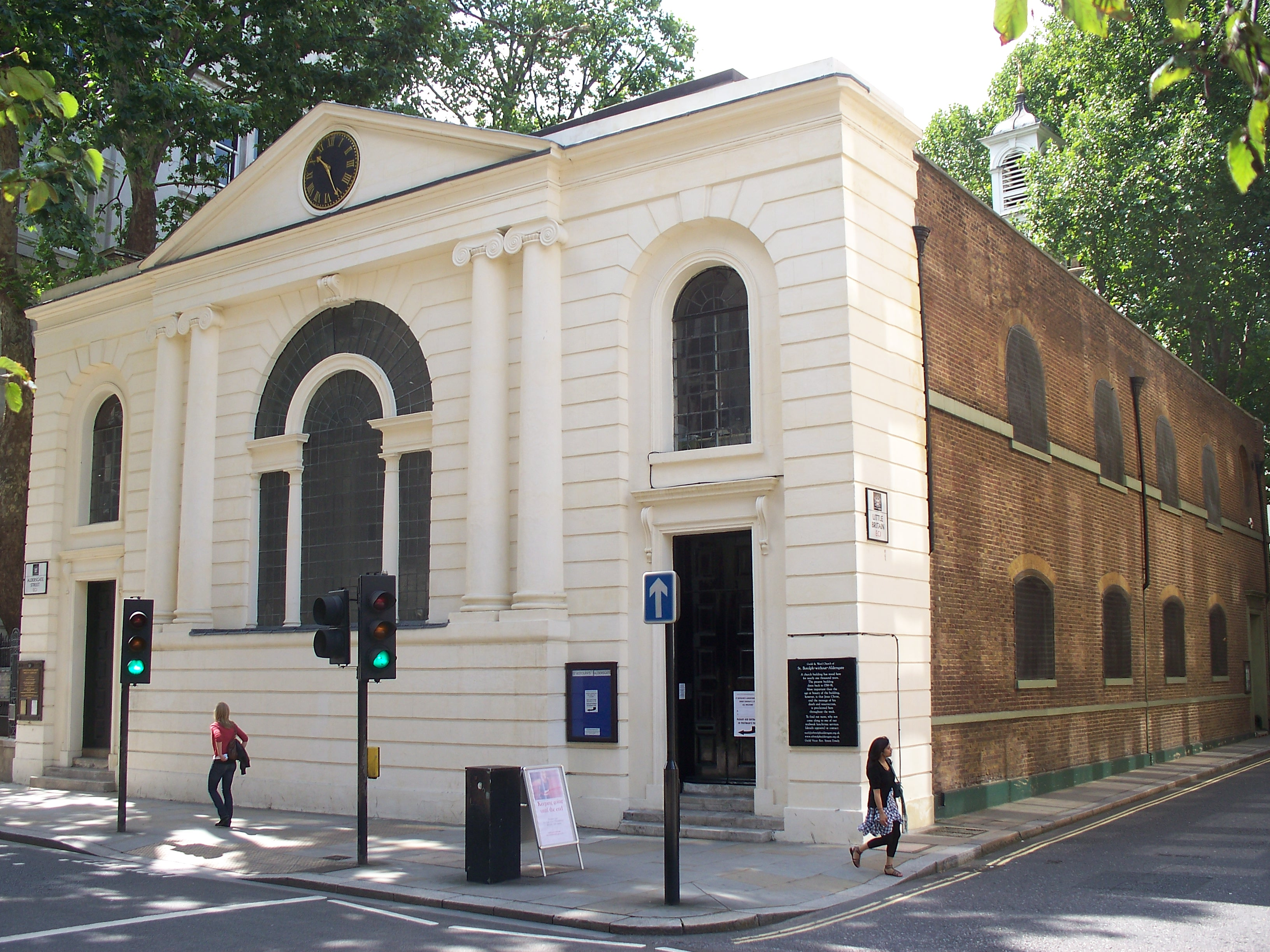

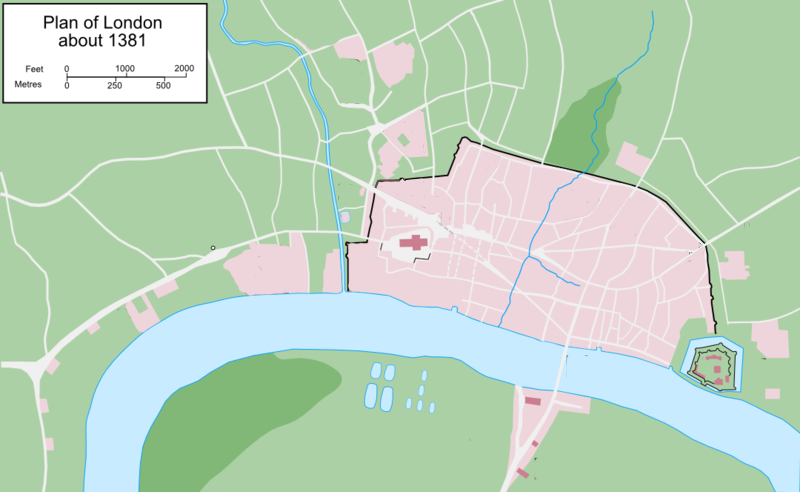
- Location: Aldersgate Street, London, EC1
- Country: England
- Denomination: Church of England, Presbyterian
- Previous denomination: Roman Catholic (to 1534)
- Website: stbotolphs.org.uk

History
- Founded: 13th century or earlier
- Dedication: Botolph of Thorney

Architecture
- Heritage designation: Grade I listed building
- Architect: Nathaniel Wright
- Architectural type: Georgian

Administration
- Diocese: London

St Botolph without Aldersgate (also known as St Botolph's, Aldersgate) is a Church of England church in London dedicated to St Botolph. It was built just outside Aldersgate, one of the gates on London's wall, in the City of London.

The church, located on Aldersgate Street, is of medieval origin. The church survived the Great Fire of London with only minor damage but subsequently fell into disrepair and was rebuilt in 1788–91. The church is renowned for its beautiful interior and historic organ. It is used by the London City Presbyterian Church, a congregation of the Free Church of Scotland.

== Dedication ==
The church was dedicated to Saint Botolph, or Botwulf, a 7th-century East Anglian abbot and saint. By the end of the 11th century, Botolph was regarded as the patron saint of boundaries and, by extension, trade, and travel. The veneration of Botolph was most pronounced before the legend of St Christopher became popular amongst travellers.

There were four churches in London dedicated to Botolph, three outside the city gates at Aldersgate, St Botolph-without-Bishopsgate, and St Botolph's Aldgate. A fourth, St Botolph Billingsgate, was near the waterfront wharves and London Bridge. St Botolph Billingsgate was destroyed by fire in 1666 and not rebuilt. The location of these churches at the edge of London reflects all three aspects of Botolph's patronage.

== History ==
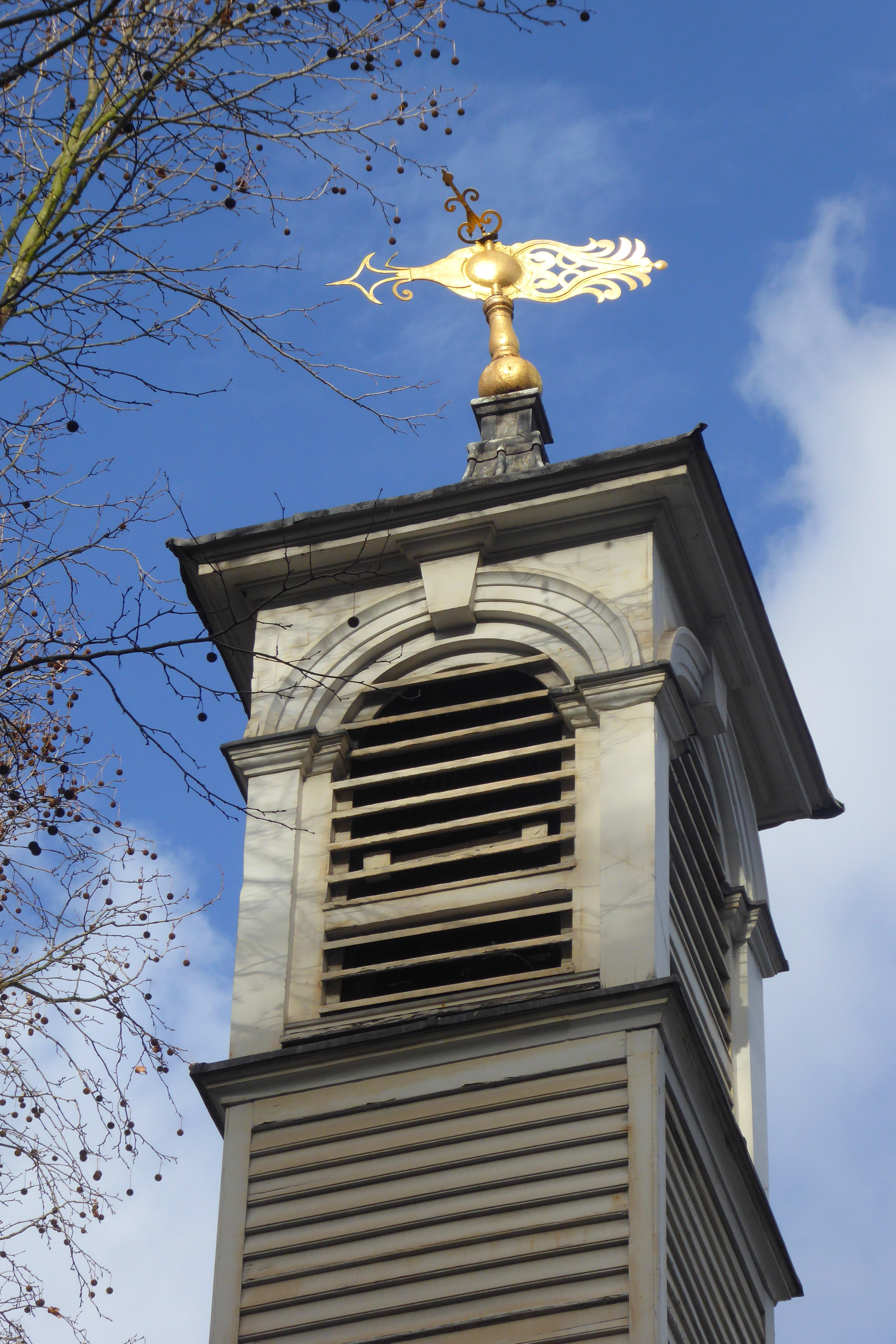
The tower and weather vane of the church

=== Medieval church ===
The church was founded before 1291. The earliest recorded rector was John de Steventon in 1333. The living was originally in the possession of St. Martin's-le-Grand, but on the dissolution of the priory, King Henry VIII granted it to the bishop of the newly founded Diocese of Westminster. The patronage eventually passed to the dean and chapter of Westminster Abbey.

During the Middle Ages, there was a hospital for the poor outside Aldersgate. A Cluniac foundation, it was suppressed by King Henry V as an alien house, and its lands and goods were granted to the parish of St Botolph.

The Gothic-style medieval church was divided into aisles and a nave by arcades. There were three gables at the east end. In 1627, the steeple was rebuilt in Portland stone with battlements and a turret, and the rest of the church was repaired. Many of the pews were replaced, and a new clock and dial were installed. The improvements cost, in total, £415. The medieval church was 78 feet (24 m) long and 51 feet (16 m) wide. The 17th-century steeple was about 65 feet (20 m) high and contained six bells. In an account published in 1773, the church is described as having galleries on the north and west sides, oak pews, and a carved oak pulpit.

=== Eighteenth-century rebuilding ===
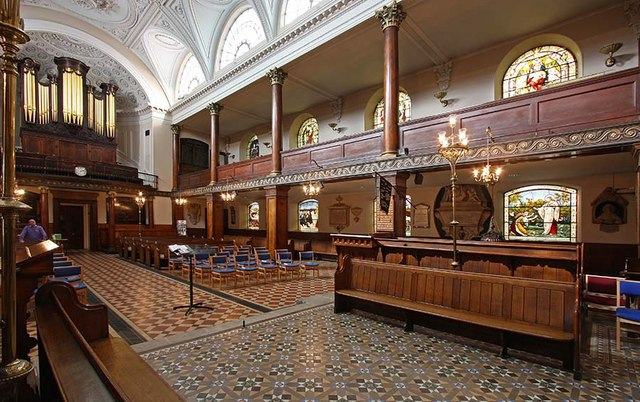
Interior of the church

The church escaped the Great Fire of London with only minor damage, but, having become unsafe, was demolished and rebuilt in its present form in 1788–1791 under the supervision of Nathaniel Wright, surveyor to the north district of the City of London. The new church was built of brick, with a low square bell tower at the west end constructed on the remains of its stone predecessor.

The plain exterior is in contrast to what John Betjeman called an "exalting" succession of features inside. The interior has wooden galleries supported on square panelled columns, a semi-circular apse with a half dome, a highly decorated plasterwork ceiling, and, at the east end the only 18th century stained glass window in the City of London, a depiction of The Agony in the Garden painted by James Pearson. The stained glass in the aisles is partly Victorian, and partly from the 1940s. Some monuments were preserved from the old church, including the tomb of Anne Packington, who died in 1563. The organ, in a gallery at the west end, is by Samuel Green and dates from 1788.

The east façade, towards Aldersgate Street, is a screen wall, erected in 1831 and executed in Roman cement, with a pediment and four attached Ionic columns standing on a high plinth, with a Venetian window between them.

The church underwent several restorations during the 19th and 20th centuries, and many of the furnishings are from the late 19th century.

=== Twentieth and twenty-first centuries ===
In the mid-1980s, the church was restored by Caroe & Partners. Work on the east front was completed in 2008.

In March 2023, after the Church of England's General Synod approved the principle of blessings for same-sex couples, the guild vicar of St Botolph's was announced as "acting area dean" of a new "deanery chapter", separate from the official diocesan structures, for clergy who felt "compelled to resist all episcopal leadership from the House of Bishops". This move was described by the Diocese of London as a "unilateral move" with "no legal substance", and by the Church Times as "schismatic".

== Churchyard ==
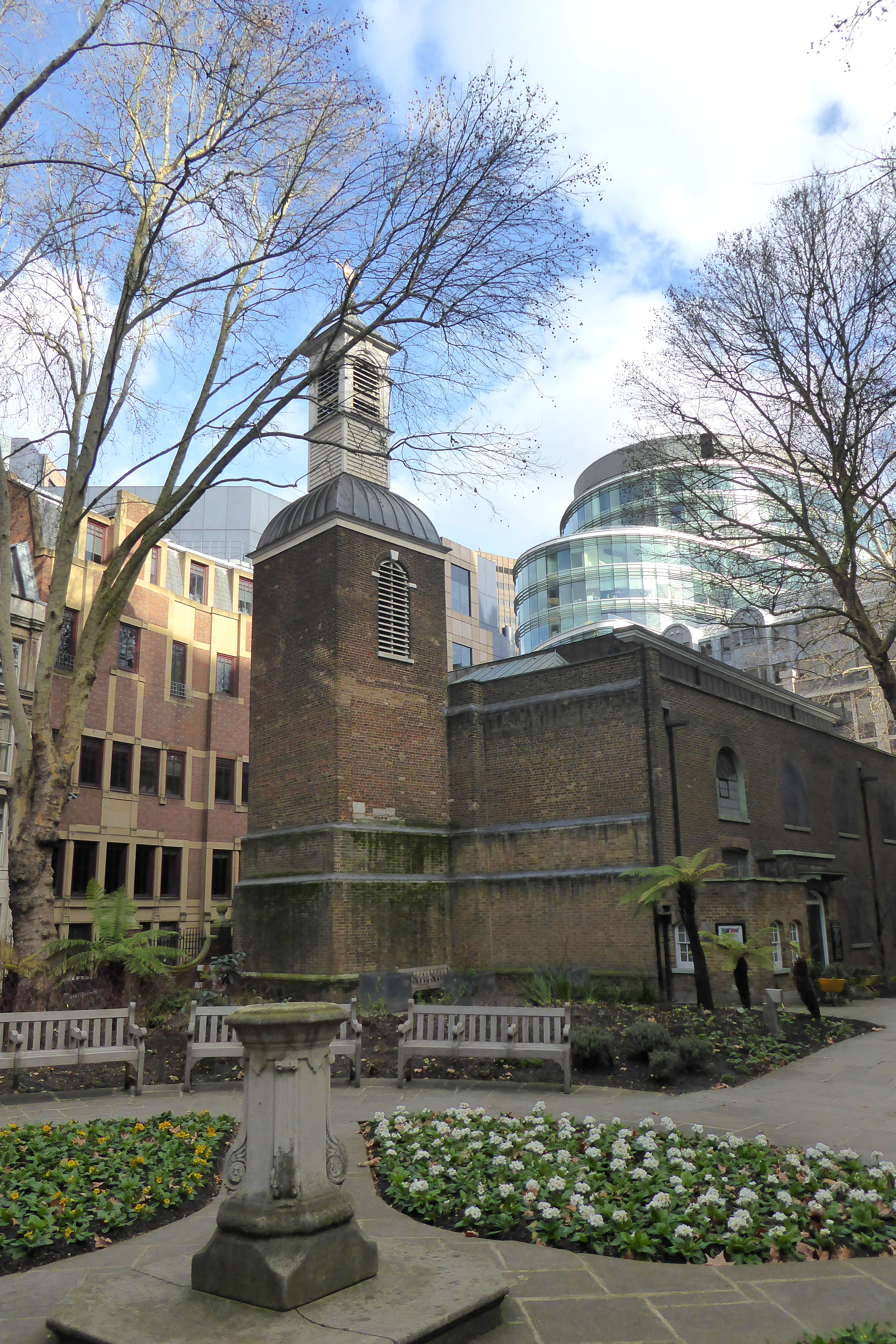
St Botolph's viewed from Postman's Park, part of which was formerly the parish churchyard.

St Botolph's churchyard was combined with those of St Leonard, Foster Lane, and Christchurch, Newgate Street, into Postman's Park in 1880, and this now contains the Watts Memorial to Historic Self-Sacrifice, commemorating civilian Londoners who died heroic deaths.

The church was designated a Grade I listed building on 4 January 1950.

== Current use ==
As a Guild Church, the church does not have a parish or Sunday services but holds lunchtime services during the week.

On Sundays, the London City Presbyterian Church uses the building. It is also the rehearsal venue for several orchestras.
