= Thomas Stanoe =

Welsh priest (died 1708)

Thomas Stanoe was a Welsh Anglican priest in the late 17th and early 18th centuries.

Stanoe was educated at Trinity College, Oxford and became a Fellow in 1667. He held three livings in the City of London: St Ethelburga, Bishopsgate; Christ Church, Greyfriars and St Leonard, Foster Lane. Stanoe was Chaplain to William and Mary. he was Archdeacon of Carmarthen from 1677 until his death on 27 February 1708.
