= Peter Warren =

Peter Warren may refer to:

- Sir Peter Warren (Royal Navy officer) (c. 1703–1752), British naval officer
- Peter Warren (cricketer) (born 1953), Australian cricketer
- Peter Warren (radio) (born 1941), Canadian investigative journalist and radio host
- Peter Warren (archaeologist) (born 1938), leading scholar of the Aegean Bronze Age
- Peter Warren (journalist) (born 1960), English investigative freelance journalist and writer
- Peter Warren (American musician) (born 1935), American jazz bassist
- Peter Warren (New Zealand musician) (born 1958), New Zealand drummer
