= Little Britain, London =

Street in the City of London, England

Coordinates: 51.5170°N 0.0978°W

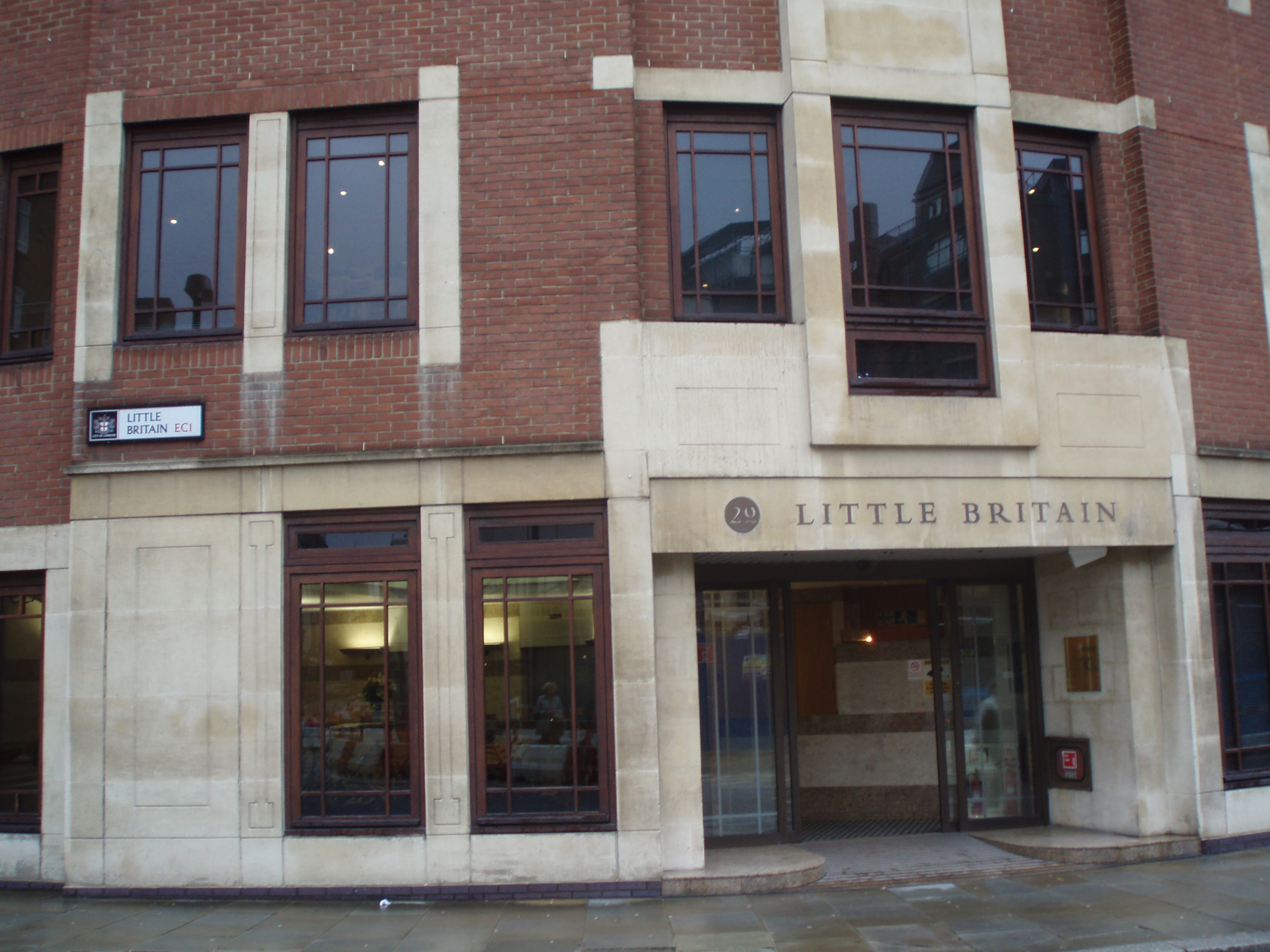
An office building on Little Britain.

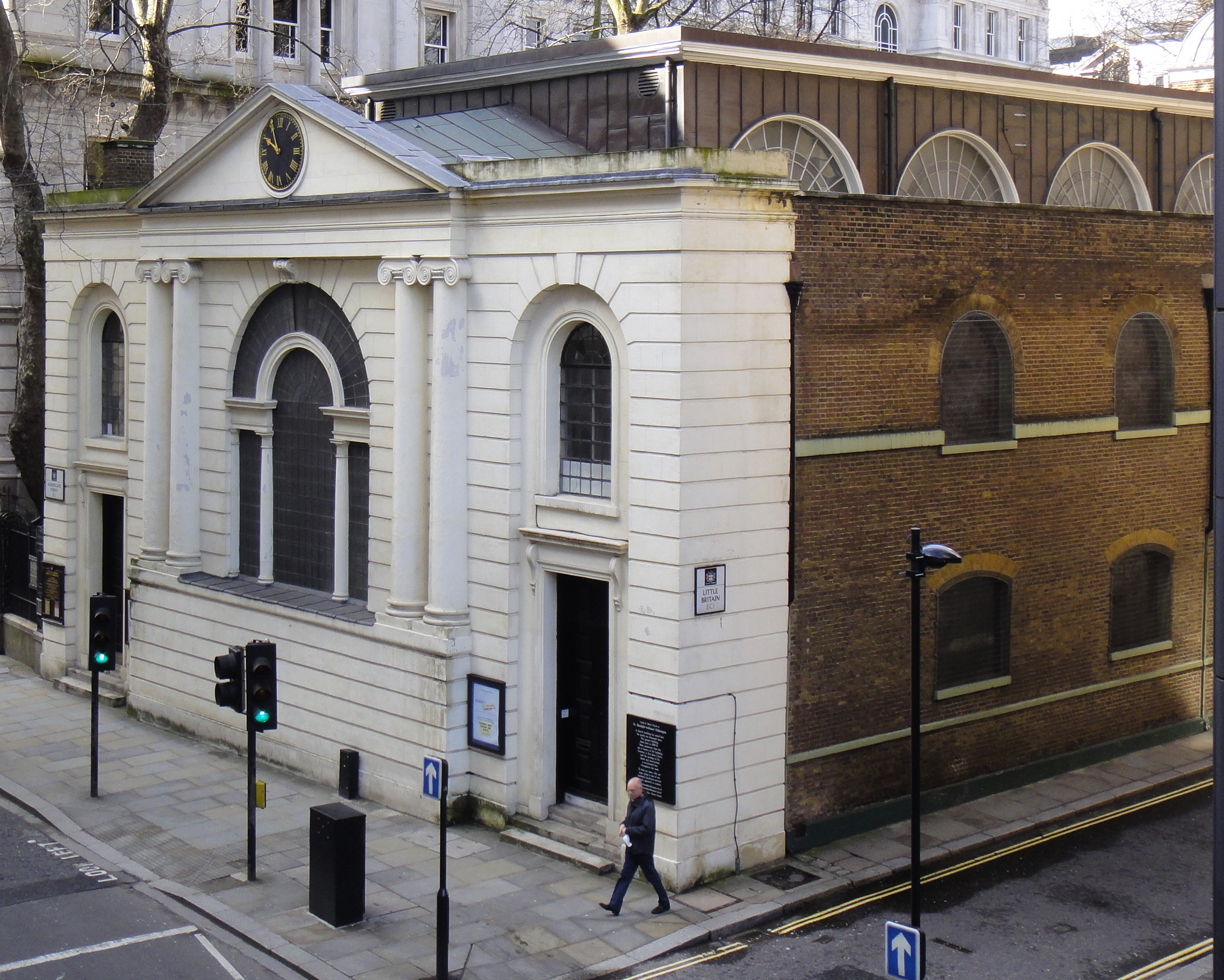
St Botolph's Aldersgate on Little Britain

Little Britain is a street in the City of London, England, running from St. Martin's Le Grand in the east to West Smithfield in the west. It is situated in the Aldersgate and Farringdon Within wards. Postman's Park is also bounded by Little Britain.

Historically, Little Britain referred to a small district in the City just north of London Wall, including this street.

Washington Irving described this district in The Sketch Book of Geoffrey Crayon, Gent., published in 1820. The opening paragraph reads:

IN the centre of the great City of London lies a small neighborhood, consisting of a cluster of narrow streets and courts, of very venerable and debilitated houses, which goes by the name of LITTLE BRITAIN. Christ Church School and St Bartholomew's Hospital bound it on the west; Smithfield and Long Lane on the north; Aldersgate Street, like an arm of the sea, divides it from the eastern part of the city; whilst the yawning gulf of Bull-and-Mouth Street separates it from Butcher Lane and the regions of Newgate. Over this little territory, thus bounded and designated, the great dome of St. Paul's, swelling above the intervening houses of Paternoster Row, Amen Corner, and Ave-Maria Lane, looks down with an air of motherly protection.

According to Irving, its name is derived from "having been, in ancient times, the residence of the Dukes of Brittany" but this is disputed (see below). Irving also called it "the stronghold of true John Bullism .. with its antiquated folks and fashions".

== History ==
It is not correct, as often said, that the name comes from a medieval Breton enclave, or a possession of the Dukes of Brittany. It in fact refers to one Robert le Bretoun, who owned houses and tenements here in the 13th century. The street is recorded as Brettonestrete in 1329, as Britten Strete in 1547, and as Lyttell Bretton in 1602.

Booksellers dominated the street from the mid-16th century, followed by goldsmiths and clothing trades from the mid-18th to the 20th centuries. The offices of the Daily Courant, the first British daily newspaper, in the 1700s were in Little Britain. Benjamin Franklin lived in Little Britain while working at Palmers printers.

The conversions of John and Charles Wesley in 1738 are recorded as happening at the house of John Bray at number 12.

== Cultural references ==
Little Britain is mentioned in Charles Dickens' novel Great Expectations as the location of Jaggers' office.

It is also mentioned in Waverley by Sir Walter Scott in connection with the publication of a manuscript.

Benjamin Franklin mentions in his autobiography that he stayed there on his first visit to London.

C. J. Sansom refers to Little Britain in his series of Matthew Shardlake novels set during the reign of Henry VIII and Elizabeth I.

== Transport ==
The nearest London Underground stations are St Paul's (Central line) and Barbican (Circle, Hammersmith & City and Metropolitan lines) and the closest mainline railway stations are City Thameslink and Moorgate.
