= Kate Johnson (writer) =

British author (born 1982)

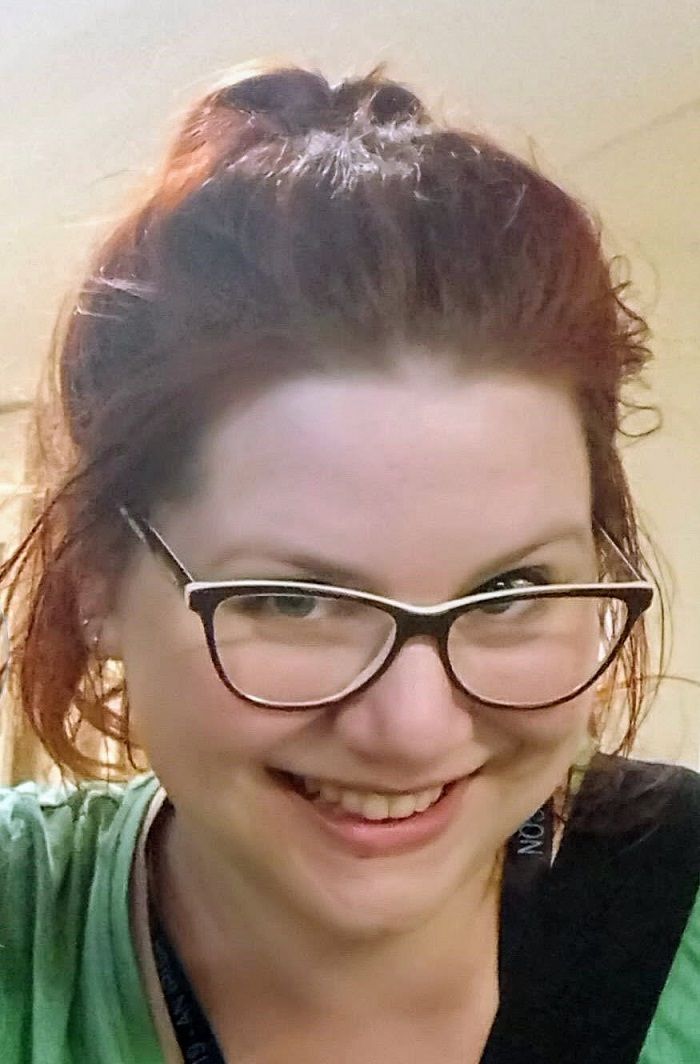
- Johnson in 2019
- Born: 1982 (age 43–44); Leeds, United Kingdom
- Occupation: Writer
- Writing career
- Pen name: Cat Marsters; Kate Johnson
- Genres: romance, fantasy, paranormal romance
- Notable awards: Paranormal or Speculative Romantic Novel of the Year Award
- Website: etaknosnhoj.blogspot.com

Kate Johnson, also known as Cat Marsters, is a British author who writes in the Paranormal and Speculative Romantic Novel genres. She is the author of the award-winning novel Max Seventeen.

== Biography ==
Kate Johnson was born in Leeds in 1982. Her family moved to Essex when she was two. Johnson lives in Essex and attended Joyce Frankland Academy.

She became a published author at the age of 23 with the sale of her first novella, She Who Dares, under her pen name Cat Marsters, and the following year sold her first book under her own name, I, Spy?.

She is the author of the Romantic Novel of the Year award-winning novel Max Seventeen. The novel was self-published, which made it the first time an indie publication won an award from the Romantic Novelists' Association. Under the name Cat Marsters she wrote erotic romance, which won the Wisconsin Romance Writers' Silver Quill and Passionate Ink's Passionate Plume award.

== Awards ==
- 2021 – Shortlisted Jackie Collins Romantic Thriller Romantic Novel of the Year Award for Death Comes To Cornwall
- 2021 – Shortlisted Holt Medallion Mainstream/Single Title for Not Your Cinderella
- 2018 – Shortlisted Paranormal or Speculative Romantic Novel of the Year Award for Max Seventeen: Firebrand
- 2017 – Winner Paranormal or Speculative Romantic Novel of the Year Award for Max Seventeen
- 2012 – Shortlisted Contemporary Romantic Novel of the Year Award for The United Kingdom
- 2010 – Epic Award for Mad, Bad and Dangerous (as Cat Marsters)
- 2005 – Silver Quill Award for Almost Human (as Cat Marsters)
- 2005 – Passionate Plume Award for Almost Human (as Cat Marsters)

== Bibliography ==
- I, Spy? (Sophie Green Mystery, #1) (2007, 2018), Samhain Publishing, self published
- "A" is for Apple (Sophie Green Mystery, #3) (2008, 2018), Samhain Publishing, self published
- Ugley Business (Sophie Green Mystery, #2) (2007, 2018), Samhain Publishing, self published
- Still Waters (Sophie Green Mystery, #4) (2008, 2018), Samhain Publishing, self published
- Run Rabbit Run (Sophie Green Mystery, #5) (2011), Choc Lit Publishing
- The Twelve Lies of Christmas (Sophie Green Mystery, #0.5) (2008, 2018), Samhain Publishing
- The UnTied Kingdom (2011, 2022) Shortlisted for Contemporary Romantic Novel of the Year Award, Choc Lit Publishing, self published
- Impossible Things (2014), Choc Lit Publishing
- Max Seventeen (2016) Paranormal and Speculative Romantic Novel of the Year Award, self published
- Max Seventeen: Firebrand (2017) Shortlisted for Paranormal and Speculative Romantic Novel of the Year Award, self published
- Max Seventeen: Empire of Dirt (2019), self published
- Little Haunting by the Sea (2018), self published
- Not Your Cinderella: a Royal Wedding Romance (2018), Shortlisted Holt Medallion Mainstream/Single Title, self published
- Not Your Prince Charming: a Royal Wedding Romance (2018), self published
- Not Your Knight in Shining Armour: a Royal Wedding Romance (2019), self published
- Not Your Royal Christmas, a royal romance novella (2018), self published
- Death Comes To Cornwall: a Molly Higgins Mystery (2020) Shortlisted for Jackie Collins Thriller Romantic Novel of the Year Award, Orion Dash
- Murder Most Cornish: a Molly Higgins Mystery (2020), Orion Dash
- Death on the Aisle: a Molly Higgins Mystery (2021), Orion Dash
- Hex Appeal (2022), HarperCollins One More Chapter
- Hex and the City (2023), HarperCollins One More Chapter
- Hex and Hexability (2024), HarperCollins One More Chapter
- The Promised Queen (2025), HarperCollins One More Chapter

As Cat Marsters

Novellas:

- Sundown Inc: She Who Dares, Changeling Press
- Sundown Inc: Blue Moon, Changeling Press
- Sundown Inc: What Wizards Want, Changeling Press
- Sundown Inc: Baby Sham Faery Love, Changeling Press
- Sundown Investigations: East Side Story, Changeling Press
- Sundown Investigations: Drive Me Daisy, Changeling Press
- Sundown Investigations: Get Lucky, Changeling Press
- Sundown Investigations: Here Kitty Kitty, Changeling Press
- Sundown International: Never Leave Me, Changeling Press
- Sundown International: Duty and the Beast, Changeling Press
- Sundown International: Unholy Trinity, Changeling Press
- Sundown International: Maneater, Changeling Press
- Paranormal Mates Society: Playing with Matches, Changeling Press
- Naked Eyes, Changeling Press
- Empire: After the Fall, Changeling Press
- Empire: Burning Desires, Changeling Press
- Empire: City of Lust, Changeling Press
- Empire: Dawn Rising, Changeling Press
- Elf Gratification, Changeling Press
- Spaceport: Incognito, Changeling Press
- Spaceport: Courtesan, Changeling Press
- Madame Periwinkle: Out of this World, Changeling Press
- Escape: Room Service, Changeling Press
- Snowbound: White Wedding, Changeling Press
- Heat Stroke: 15 Minutes from the Sun, Changeling Press
- Dreaming of You, Changeling Press
- Hardest of Hearts, Changeling Press

Novels:

- Almost Human, Ellora’s Cave
- Mad, Bad & Dangerous, Ellora’s Cave
