= Thank You for the Sunshine =

Single by Shakila Karim
- Released: 8 December 2012
- Genre: Pop
- Length: 3:14

Shakila Karim singles chronology
"Are You All Ready" (2012)	"Thank You for the Sunshine" (2012)

"Thank You for the Sunshine" is a song recorded by English singer Shakila Karim. It was released on 8 December 2012.

== Background and composition ==
"Thank You for the Sunshine" is the fifth single by Shakila Karim. The song is dedicated to everyone who helped to make the London 2012 Olympic Games successful.
