= Are You All Ready =

Single by Shakila Karim
- Released: 28 August 2012
- Genre: Pop
- Length: 3:17

Shakila Karim singles chronology
"Heroes" (2011)	"Are You All Ready" (2012)	"Thank You for the Sunshine" (2012)

"Are You All Ready" is a song recorded by English singer Shakila Karim. It was released on 28 August 2012.

== Background and composition ==
"Are You All Ready" is the fourth single by Shakila Karim. The song was intended to inspire the athletes competing in London 2012 Paralympics Games.
