= Joyce Frankland Academy =

Joyce Frankland Academy, Newport

Location
- Bury Water Lane; Newport, Essex, CB11 3TR; England
- 51°59′26″N 0°12′50″E

Information
- Former name: Newport Free Grammar School
- Type: Academy
- Established: 1588; 438 years ago
- Founder: Joyce Frankland
- Department for Education URN: 138734 Tables
- Ofsted: Reports
- Headteacher: Deborah Warwick
- Gender: Coeducational
- Age: 11 to 18
- Enrolment: 987
- Houses: Thompson Caius; Saxie Banstead; Morden Trappes
- Former pupils: Old Newportonians
- Website: www.jfan.org.uk

Joyce Frankland Academy, Newport, formerly Newport Free Grammar School, is a school in Newport, Essex, England. It was founded in 1588. The school is a mixed secondary school with a sixth form. It previously existed in different forms including a boarding school and a grammar school. The headteacher is Deborah Warwick. As of 2012, there were 987 students, including 160 in the sixth form.

It takes its current name (since 2012) after Dame Joyce Frankland (1531-1588), the only daughter of goldsmith Robert Trappes, who founded it as the "free Grammer Schole of Newport". Dame Joyce also made a number of educational bequests in her will to colleges at the universities of Oxford and Cambridge.

== Specialist and academy status ==
The school achieved Specialist Language College status in July 2003 from DfES and has been a Language College since September 2003. The school achieved a second specialism in Science, commencing 1 September 2008 but this was later lost.

The school converted to academy status on 1 September 2012.

== Academic standards ==
In 2011, Newport Free Grammar School was ranked 405th out of the 429 institutions supplying A-Level results to the Daily Telegraph's annual league table based on the percentages of A*, A and B grades achieved.

Following an inspection on 15 March 2006, Ofsted rated the school as good, the second-best grade on its four-point scale. Inspectors said teaching was "sometimes outstanding, even inspirational" in languages and the humanities but needed improvement in mathematics and IT.

== Notable former pupils ==
- Max Barrett, morbid anatomist and histologist
- Charles George Broyden, mathematician
- Martin Caton, MP for Gower
- Jimmy Doherty, BBC broadcaster and farmer
- Paul Epworth, music producer
- James Frain, film actor
- Matt Holland, Republic of Ireland footballer
- Kate Johnson, novelist
- Shakila Karim, singer-songwriter and musician
- Jamie Oliver, television chef and author
- J. W. Pritchard, civil servant of the Indian civil service
- Pip Pyle, drummer with Gong and Hatfield and the North
- Laura Sugar, Paralympic athlete
- David Sutton, archivist and local politician
- Peter Warren, journalist
