= Heroes (Shakila Karim song) =

Single by Shakila Karim
- Released: 28 November 2011
- Genre: Pop
- Length: 4:37
- Songwriter(s): Shakila Karim; Karim Ullah

Shakila Karim singles chronology
"Gone Too Soon" (2011)	"Heroes" (2011)	"Are You All Ready" (2012)

"Heroes" is a song recorded by English singer Shakila Karim. It was released on 28 November 2011.

== Background and composition ==
"Heroes" is the third single by Shakila Karim. The song was co-written by Karim and her father, Karim Ullah, with Karim putting together the melody to accompany her father's lyrics. She played the piano on the recording and created the vocal ideas, including the chorus and harmonies for the song.

The song was released in aid of the Help for Heroes charity which supports the rehabilitation of injured British service personnel from conflicts such as Iraq and Afghanistan. It was recorded and produced free of charge in November 2011. A video was produced by Big Buoy TV, intercutting Karim's performance with Ministry of Defence footage of British soldiers in Afghanistan.
