= Shakila Karim =

English singer-songwriter and musician (born 1997)

Shakila Karim শাকিলা করিম
- Also known as: Shakila K.
- Born: 13 November 1997 (age 28); Whitechapel, Tower Hamlets, London, England
- Origin: London, England
- Occupations: Singer; songwriter
- Instruments: Vocals; violin; recorder; piano; ukulele; drums
- Years active: 2010–present

Shakila Karim (Bengali: শাকিলা করিম; born 13 November 1997) is an English singer-songwriter and musician, known professionally as Shakila K.

== Early life ==
Karim was born at the Royal London Hospital in Whitechapel, Tower Hamlets, London, England and is of Bangladeshi descent. Karim's parents are Karim Ullah (born 1977) and Sultana Parvin, and she has a younger sister, Sonia.

Karim attended Gatehouse School in Bethnal Green. She received speech therapy to help her speak. Yet she was able to sing nursery rhymes perfectly. At around the same time, she started playing her first musical instrument, the violin, when she was a toddler and went on to learn the recorder, piano, ukulele and drums. When she was 11 years old, Karim's family moved out of the East End to Hertfordshire and she started her secondary education at Hockerill Anglo-European College in Bishop's Stortford. She started taking singing lessons from the first term and, in her first year at the school, she passed her Rock School grade three exam. She then attended school in Newport, Essex near Carver Barracks, and then Newport Free Grammar School in Uttlesford. As of 2015, she was studying A-levels at Joyce Frankland Academy in Newport. After completing her A-levels in 2016 Karim enrolled at The ICMP (The Institute of Contemporary Music Performance) to study Creative Musicianship where she is a final year student.

== Career ==
During the 2010 summer holidays, Karim uploaded her first videos on YouTube, started performing at local venues, entered the 2011 Stortford Music Festival, and auditioned for Britain's Got Talent at the age of 12.

In 2011, Karim released three self-produced singles. On 4 July, Karim's debut single "Just Let It Go" was released. On 24 October, her second single "Gone Too Soon" was released. On 28 November, her third single "Heroes" was released in aid of the Help for Heroes charity which supports the rehabilitation of injured British service personnel from conflicts such as Iraq and Afghanistan. On 28 August 2012, her fourth single "Are You All Ready" was released. The song was intended to inspire the athletes competing in London 2012 Paralympics Games. On 8 December 2012, her fifth single "Thank You for the Sunshine" was released. The song is dedicated to the London 2012 Olympic Games. Karim's father, Karim Ullah, wrote "Just Let It Go" and "Gone Too Soon", and "Heroes" was co-written by Karim and her father.

In May 2012, Karim performed at the Stortford Music Festival and the Boishakhi Mela. In the same month, she performed live on BBC Asian Network's Tommy Sandhu Show. In August of the same year, she performed at the Hertford Music Festival. In August 2014, she performed at the second annual Warren Classic.

In October 2013, Karim performed at Wembley Stadium as part of the 92Plus1 challenge to raise money for Help for Heroes. She sang before England's World Cup qualifier against Poland.

In June 2015, Karim began a musical 'marathon' to sing at 26 different concerts to raise money for the victims of Nepal's earthquake, after being inspired by some of her schoolfriends at Joyce Frankland Academy who are from Nepal. In August of the same year, she performed live on BBC Asian Network.

During the summer of 2017, Karim and her father organised a special concert for ICMP students to raise money for the survivors of Grenfell Tower.

Karim released two self-penned tracks in 2018. For the first one "The Mask Is Always On" she was interviewed on BBC Three Counties Radio and got to sing live. Her second track was "Electricity". She worked with fellow The ICMP students Milxnake (Serena Harmsworth) and Lucas Green on both tracks. In April 2019, Karim opened for 1990s English boy band East 17 in Bishop's Stortford.

== Personal life ==
Karim's father, Karim Ullah, left school with no qualifications but went on to work in media sales and later to set up his own Asian business publication in 2007. Her father's business suffered due to the 2008 financial crisis, and in 2010, it was forced to close. Consequently, Karim had to be taken out of boarding school and had to stop taking singing lessons. The business failure also meant that the family, who were by then renting a home in Bishops Stortford, became homeless and spent three months in a homeless hostel in Spellbrook. While living in the hostel, Karim's father became ill. He had to undergo major emergency surgery in October 2010 to remove part of his intestine following the flare-up of his previously diagnosed Crohn's disease and was hospitalised for several weeks, then suffering appendicitis in September 2011. Karim's father is now a writer for a golf magazine.

Karim now lives with her parents in Bishop's Stortford, Hertfordshire. She has been influenced musically by Michael Jackson, Queen, Freddie Mercury, Elton John, Madonna, Lady Gaga, Amy Lee and Rihanna.

== Discography ==
=== Singles ===
Year	Title	Chart positions	Album
2011	"Just Let It Go"		
2011	"Gone Too Soon"		
2011	"Heroes"		
2012	"Are You All Ready"		
2012	"Thank You for The Sunshine"		
2018	"The Mask Is Always On"		
2018	"Electricity"		

== See also ==
- British Bangladeshi
- List of British Bangladeshis
