= Just Let It Go =

Single by Shakila Karim
- Released: 4 July 2011
- Recorded: High Barn music studios in Great Bardfield, Essex
- Genre: Electronic; dance
- Length: 4:08
- Songwriter(s): Karim Ullah

Shakila Karim singles chronology
"Just Let It Go" (2011)	"Gone Too Soon" (2011)

"Just Let It Go" is a song recorded by English singer Shakila Karim. It was released on 4 July 2011.

== Background and composition ==
"Just Let It Go" is the debut sing by Shakila Karim. The song was written by Karim's father, Karim Ullah, and recorded at High Barn music studios in Great Bardfield, Essex.
