= Peter Warren (journalist) =

British journalist

Peter Warren (born 1960) is an English technology and investigative journalist for various newspapers, most notably The Guardian and Sunday Times. He frequently appears on national TV and radio and has provided evidence and advice on request to the UK Government and the House of Lords. Warren specialises in technology, undercover investigations, and science issues. He is the former technology editor of Scotland on Sunday and the Sunday Express and a former associate producer for the BBC2 Sci Files series.

== Career ==
In 1991, Warren reported on Kuwait and Iraq for the Guardian newspaper during Kuwait's liberation in the first Gulf War and has reported from places as diverse as Taiwan, Romania, Argentina, the Philippines and the Kalahari Desert.

A frequent reporter for the Sunday Times Insight team, Warren has also worked for the Sunday Times Magazine, most notably on the magazine cover story investigation into the illegal drug culture in Moss Side in Manchester in March 1993.

In 1996, Warren was runner-up in the UK Press Gazette Business Awards for Technology Scoop of the Year. A guest speaker on Technology Ethics to the European Union's Information Society Technologies conference in 1999 in Helsinki, he is now a speaker at conferences and events and organises the annual Professor Donald Michie Conference on AI with the law firm Cooley and the Institution of Engineering Technology. Warren, who lives in Suffolk, is an expert on computer security issues. Warren was one of the UK's first journalists to stress the issues raised by computer viruses and the need to address the threat of computer crime in the late 1980s, a topic that Warren has been a campaigner on since that time.

Warren is now the director of two technology websites, Cyber Security Research Institute and Future Intelligence.

== Biography ==
Peter Warren was born in Harlow, Essex. Warren went on to work for Computer Talk after being educated at Newport Grammar School and Northumbria University. After Computer Talk he wrote for the Sunday Times, The Guardian, Daily Express, Scotland on Sunday, the Sunday Herald, Mail on Sunday, Daily Mirror, Evening Standard, Sunday Business, Sunday Express and other specialist magazines. He has also appeared in documentaries with Channel 4, the BBC and Sky News. Warren is a regular commentator on cybercrime issues for Sky News.

In 2006, Warren won the BT IT Security News story of the year prize for his work exposing the practice of discarding computer hard drives containing sensitive business and personal data. Then in 2007, Warren won the IT Security News story of the year prize again for work done with Future Intelligence showing that Chinese hackers had broken into the UK Houses of Parliament. In 2008 Warren won the BT Enigma Award for services to technology security journalism.

In 2005, with Michael Streeter, Warren wrote the book, Cyber Alert.

Since 2009, Warren has worked on the creation of the Cyber Security Research Institute, an organisation raising awareness of cybercrime.

From 2012, Warren has been the presenter on the PassW0rd radio show on London's ResonanceFM, an hour-long monthly programme on technology that he developed with the radio producer Jane Whyatt.

In 2013, Warren again collaborated with Michael Streeter to write Cyber crime and warfare published by Hodder and Stoughton.

In 2014, Warren, Streeter and Whyatt produced a report for the European think tank Netopia entitled Can We Make the Digital World Ethical? which was presented to the European Union and subsequently led to an invitation from the French Senate to give a speech to it.

Warren was one of the first people to raise concerns about the issues that AI will present, and in 2014 he was the lead writer of 'Can We Make the Digital World Ethical' for the European technology think tank Netopia which was presented to the EU. As a result of the EU presentation, Warren was asked to give a presentation to the French Senate on technology ethics. The speech was very well received, with DeepMind collaborator Professor Murray Shanahan, Professor of Cognitive Robotics at Imperial College (who also gave evidence to the French Senate) calling for it to be published. DeepMind, now owned by Google is one of the world's leading AI companies.

In 2017 Warren was asked to organise a series of conferences to discuss the ramifications of AI by Cooley LLP, one of the world's 50 largest law firms, which includes Google and Microsoft among its many clients. The conferences are held jointly between Future Intelligence, Cooley and the Institution of Engineering Technology and are now named after Professor Donald Michie.

Warren was asked to submit evidence to the House of Lords Select Committee on AI which re-opened its investigation into the ethics of AI technology after attending Warren's first conference in 2018.
