= Gone Too Soon (Shakila Karim song) =

Single by Shakila Karim
- Released: 24 October 2011
- Genre: Pop; easy listening
- Length: 4:24
- Songwriter(s): Karim Ullah

Shakila Karim singles chronology
"Just Let It Go" (2011)	"Gone Too Soon" (2011)	"Heroes" (2011)

"Gone Too Soon" is a song recorded by English singer Shakila Karim. It was released on 24 October 2011.

== Background and composition ==
"Gone Too Soon" is the second single by Shakila Karim. The song was written by Karim's father, Karim Ullah, and is a tribute to singers who have died young, including Amy Winehouse, Michael Jackson, Freddie Mercury, John Lennon, Elvis Presley, Jimi Hendrix, Billie Holiday and Kurt Cobain.
