= St Leonard, Foster Lane =

Coordinates: 51.5152°N 0.0966°W

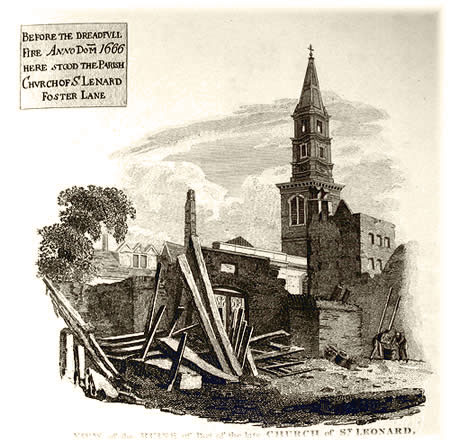
- Ruins of St. Leonard's
- St Leonard, Foster Lane
- Location: Foster Lane, London
- Country: England
- Denomination: Anglican

History
- Founded: 13th century

Architecture
- Closed: 1666

St Leonard, Foster Lane, was a Church of England church dedicated to Leonard of Noblac on the west side of Foster Lane in the Aldersgate ward of the City of London. It was destroyed in the Great Fire of 1666 and not rebuilt.

== History ==
This church originally belonged to the College of St Martin-le-Grand. It was founded in the 13th century by the dean and canons of St. Martin's, to serve the inhabitants of the precinct, who had previously worshipped at the altar of St Leonard in the collegiate church. The building, which was small, stood in the courtyard of the collegiate church, on the west side of Foster Lane.

There is a record of a new window being installed in the chancel in 1533. In 1579, the existing graveyard, being too small was leased out, and a new one laid out on an area of the precinct previously known as the "Dean's Garden" leased by the churchwarden and parishioners for a term of 61 years. The building was repaired and enlarged in 1631, at a cost of more than £500.

The poet Francis Quarles, who died 1644, was buried there.

== Destruction ==
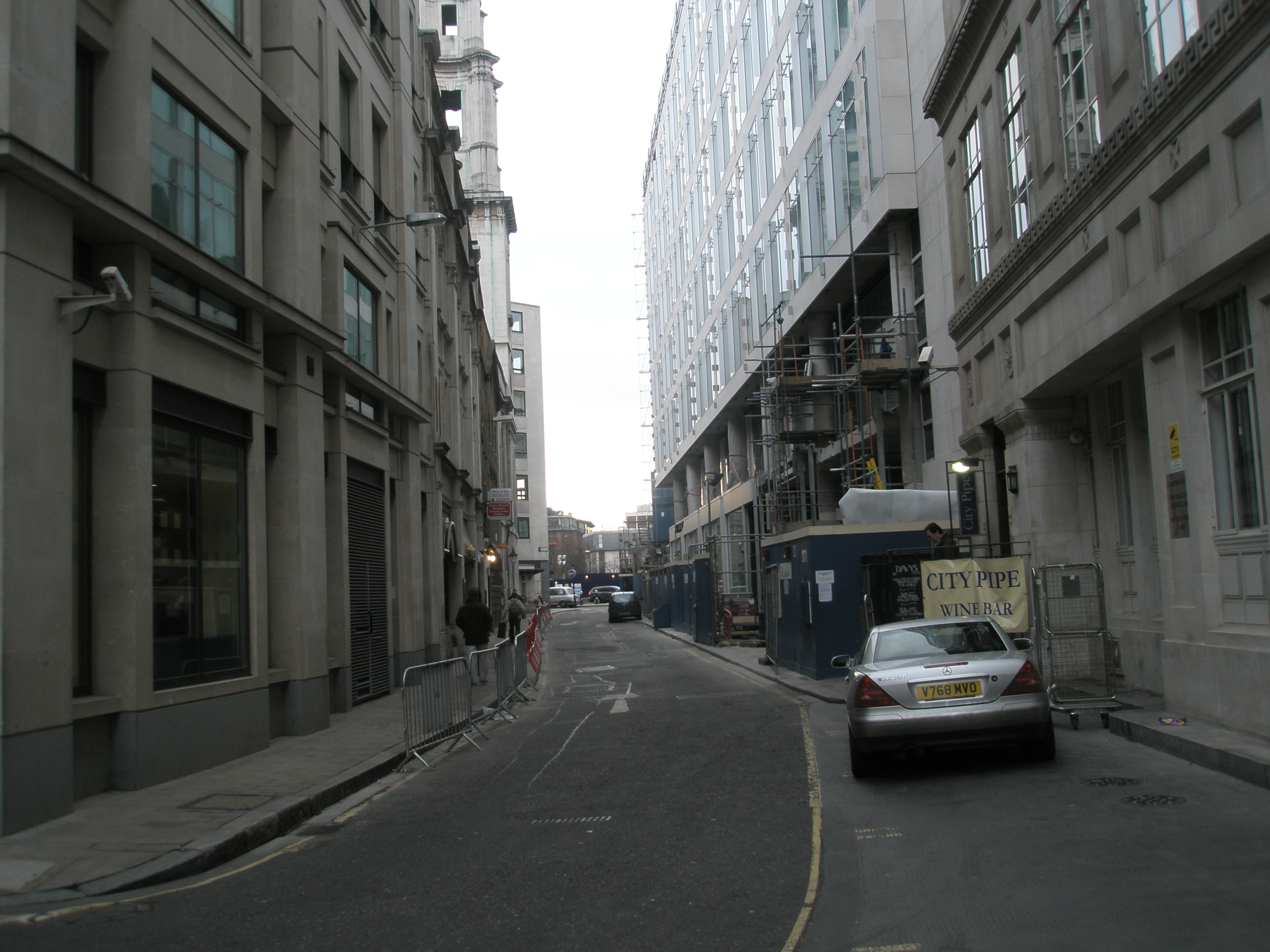
Site of StL, FL today

St Leonard's was largely destroyed in the Great Fire of 1666 and not rebuilt. the parish instead being united to that of Christ Church, Newgate Street, and the site used as a graveyard. Some ruins of the church remained, however, until the early 19th century, when they were finally cleared to make way for the new buildings of the General Post Office.

Despite the destruction of the church, the "Parish Dole" was still available as late as 1907.

Its former burial ground now forms part of Postman's Park.
