= Foster Lane =

Street in the City of London

Coordinates: 51.5155°N 0.0964°W

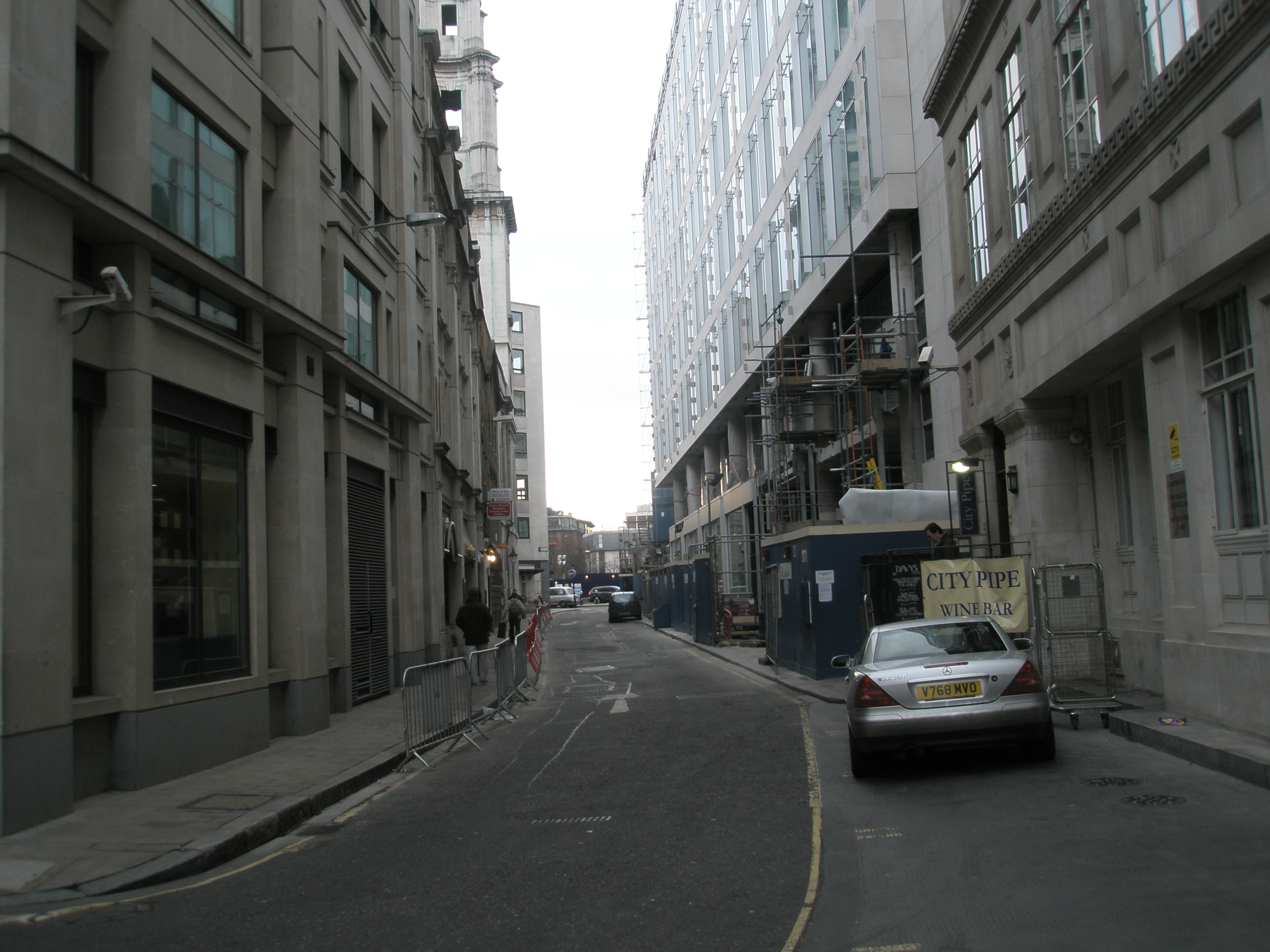
Foster Lane, in the City of London

Foster Lane is a short street within Cheap ward, in the City of London, England. It is situated northeast of St Paul's Cathedral and runs southbound Gresham Street to Cheapside.

"Foster" is a corruption of 'St Vedast' to whom a church on the east side of the road is dedicated. Another church on Foster Lane - dedicated to St Leonard - was destroyed in the Great Fire of London and not rebuilt. This church was connected with the Liberty of St Martin's Le Grand to the east.

Goldsmiths' Hall, the livery hall of the Worshipful Company of Goldsmiths, one of the Twelve Great Livery Companies of the city is situated on the northeast corner. Like much of this area it suffered damage during the Second World War. Although being relatively short in length, Foster Lane is also the location of several bars and restaurants and a small lane (Carey Lane) off it halfway that runs eastward to Gutter Lane.

The nearest London Underground station is St Paul's and the closest mainline railway stations are City Thameslink and Cannon Street.
