= Smith v. Commissioner =

- Court: United States Board of Tax Appeals
- Full case name: Henry C. and Lillie M. Wright Smith v. Commissioner of Internal Revenue
- Decided: December 7, 1939
- Citation: 40 B.T.A. 1038

Court membership
- Judge sitting: Clarence V. Opper

Case opinions
- Decision by: Opper

Keywords
- tax deductibility

Smith v. Commissioner, 40 B.T.A. 1038 (1939) is a United States tax case discussing the boundaries of tax deductibility.

HELD:

- Cost of hiring nursemaids to care for the infant child of a couple, both of whom are employed, not deductible as an ordinary and necessary business expense of the wife.

== Academic commentary ==
The Smith decision demonstrates that it is the basic terms of existence of a person already at work that mark the boundary between business and personal expense.

== Judgment ==
The following is a quotation from the body of the court's judgment:

Petitioners would have us apply the ‘but for‘ test. They propose that but for the nurses the wife could not leave her child; but for the freedom so secured she could not pursue her gainful labors; and but for them there would be no income and no tax. This thought evokes an array of interesting possibilities. The fee to the doctor, but for whose healing service the earner of the family income could not leave his sickbed; the cost of the laborer's raiment, for how can the world proceed about its business unclothed; the very home which gives us shelter and rest and the food which provides energy, might all by an extension of the same proposition be construed as necessary to the operation of business and to the creation of income. Yet these are the very essence of those ‘personal‘ expenses the deductibility of which is expressly denied. Revenue Act of 1936, section 24(a).

We are told that the working wife is a new phenomenon. This is relied on to account for the apparent inconsistency that the expenses in issue are now a commonplace, yet have not been the subject of legislation, ruling, or adjudicated controversy. But if that is true it becomes all the more necessary to apply accepted principles to the novel facts. We are not prepared to say that the care of children, like similar aspects of family and household life, is other than a personal concern. The wife's services as custodian of the home and protector of its children are ordinarily rendered without monetary compensation. There results no taxable income from the performance of this service and the correlative expenditure is personal and not susceptible of deduction. Rosa E. Burkhart, 11 B.T.A. 275. Here the wife has chosen to employ others to discharge her domestic function and the services she performs are rendered outside the home. They are a source of actual income and taxable as such. But that does not deprive the same work performed by others of its personal character nor furnish a reason why its cost should be treated as an offset in the guise of a deductible item.

We are not unmindful that, as petitioners suggest, certain disbursements normally personal may become deductible by reason of their intimate connection with an occupation carried on for profit. In this category fall entertainment, Blackmer v. Commissioner, 70 Fed.(2d) 255 (C.C.A., 2d Cir.), and traveling expenses, Joseph W. Powell, 34 B.T.A. 655; affd., 94 Fed. (2d) 483 (C.C.A., 1st Cir.), and the cost of an actor's wardrobe, Charles Hutchison, 13 B.T.A. 1187. The line is not always an easy one to draw nor the test simple to apply. But we think its principle is clear. It may for practical purposes be said to constitute a distinction between those activities which, as a matter of common acceptance and universal experience, are ‘ordinary‘ or usual as the direct accompaniment of business pursuits, on the one hand; and those which, though they may in some indirect and tenuous degree relate to the circumstances of a profitable occupation, are nevertheless personal in their nature, of a character applicable to human beings generally, and which exist on that plane regardless of the occupation, *1040 though not necessarily of the station in life, of the individuals concerned. See Welch v. Helvering, 290 U.S. 111.

In the latter category, we think, fall payments made to servants or others occupied in looking to the personal wants of their employers. David Sonenblick, 4 B.T.A. 986. And we include in this group nursemaids retained to care for infant children.
