= Isleworth Cemetery =

Cemetery in London, England

Coordinates: 51.4761°N 0.3231°W

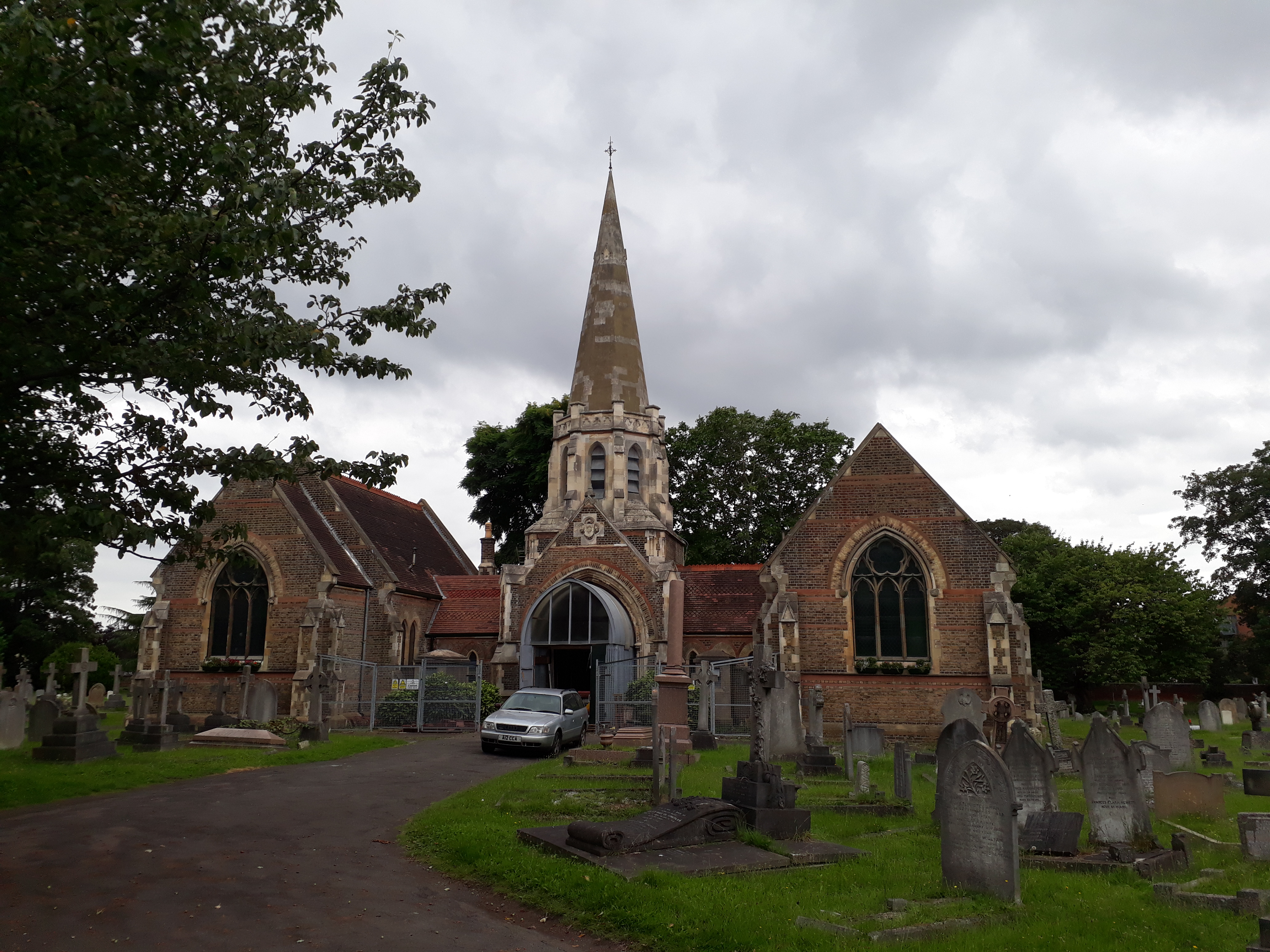
Chapel and graves in Isleworth Cemetery

Isleworth Cemetery is a cemetery in Isleworth, London Borough of Hounslow, in west London, England.

The cemetery is classified as full. The last formal burial service took place in the chapel building in the mid 1970s.

The chapel and mortuary buildings were closed in the early 1980s. Following a forty year period of neglect, the buildings have recently been extensively refurbished by Hounslow Men's Shed.

The chapels now operate as a community workshop as part of the UK Men's shed programme.

== Notable burials and memorials ==
- Alice Ayres – English household assistant and nursemaid who is known for rescuing three nieces from a burning building at 194 Union Street, Southwark
- George Manville Fenn – Author, editor and dramatist
- James Montgomrey (d. 1883) – Brentford timber merchant and benefactor, and his family
- Memorial to Thomas Pears – Descendant of Andrew Pears, founder of A & F Pears Ltd, the soap company. Thomas, age 29, died in the Titanic tragedy
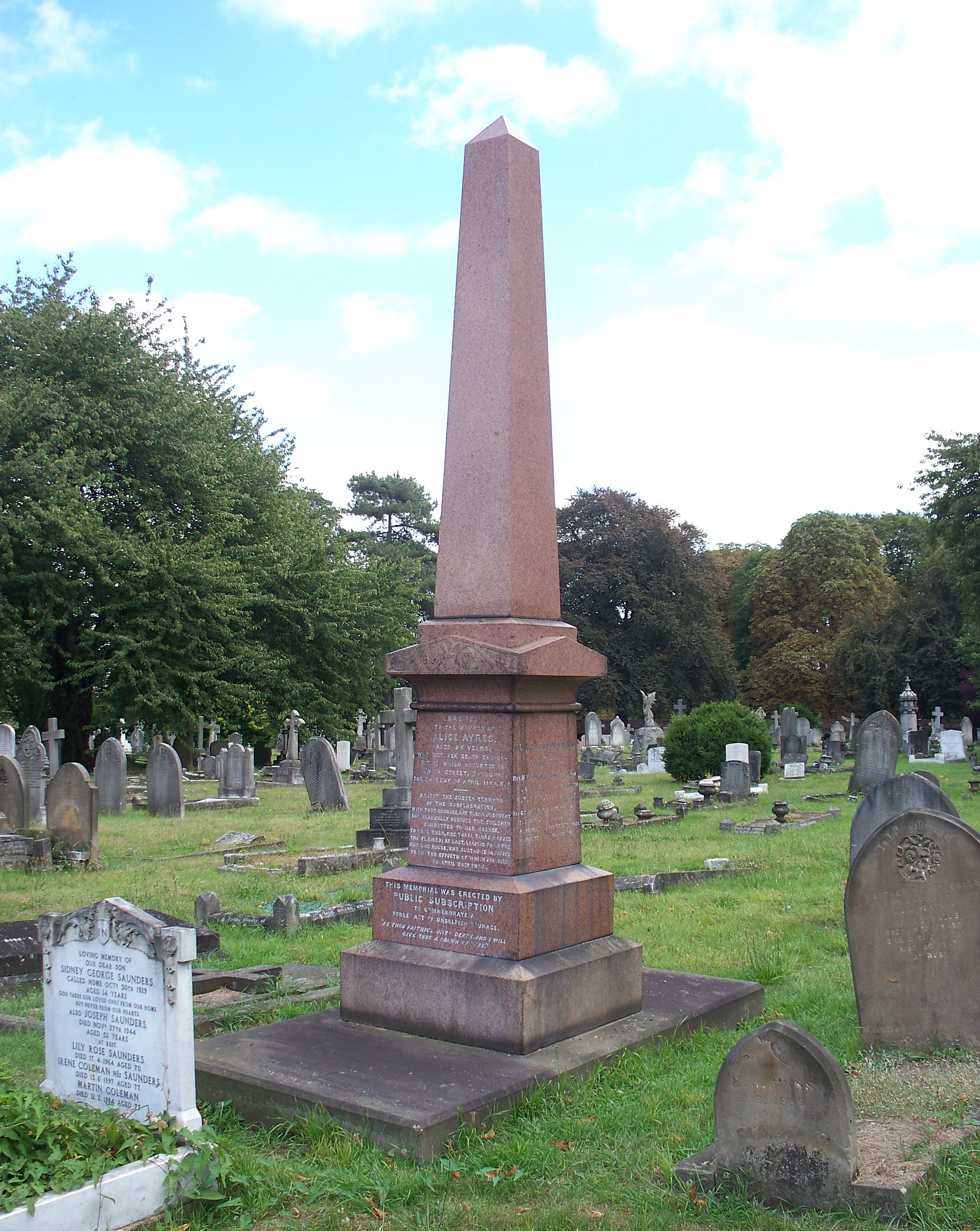
Alice Ayres's grave

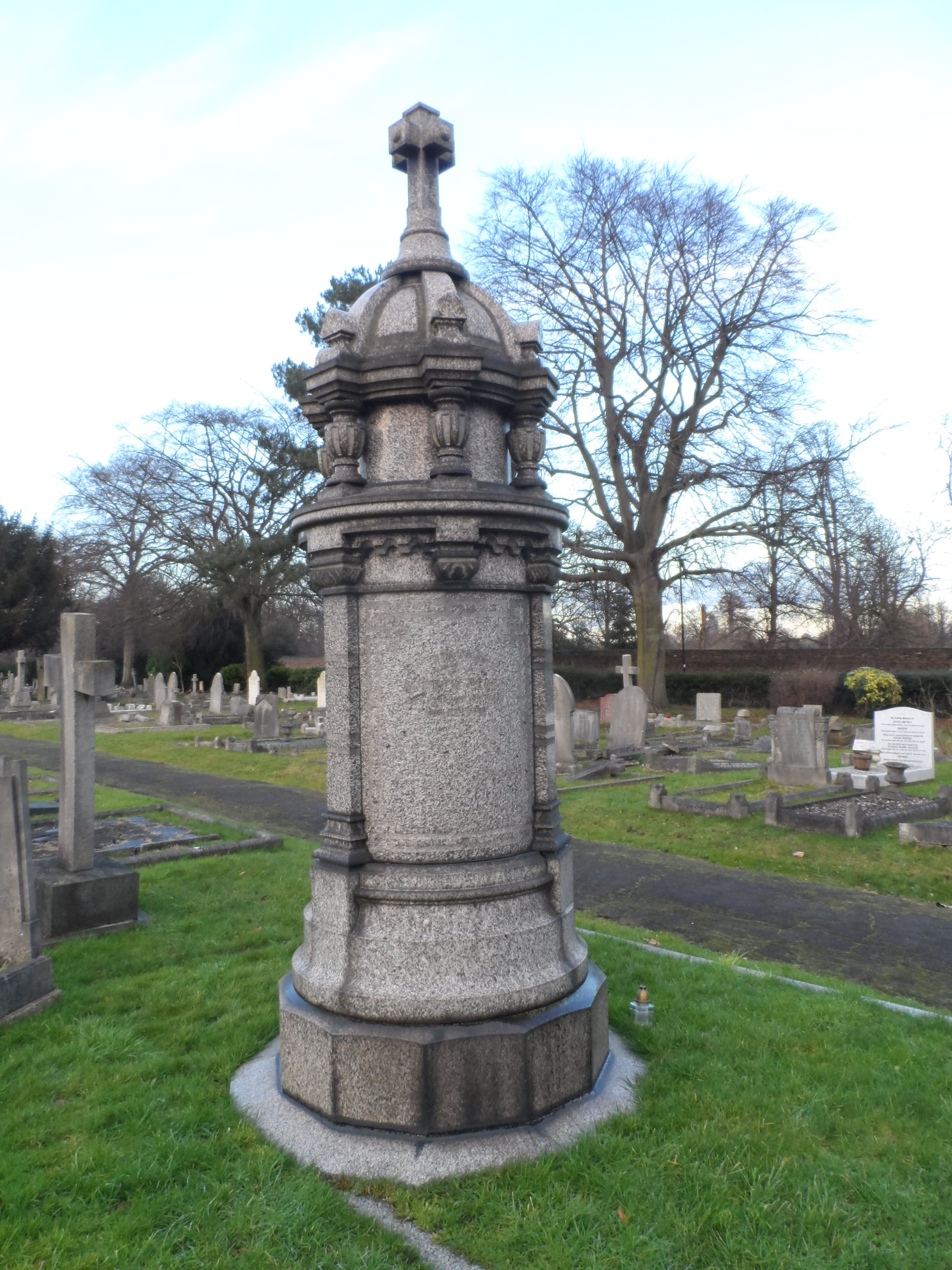
Memorial to three members of the Pears soap family

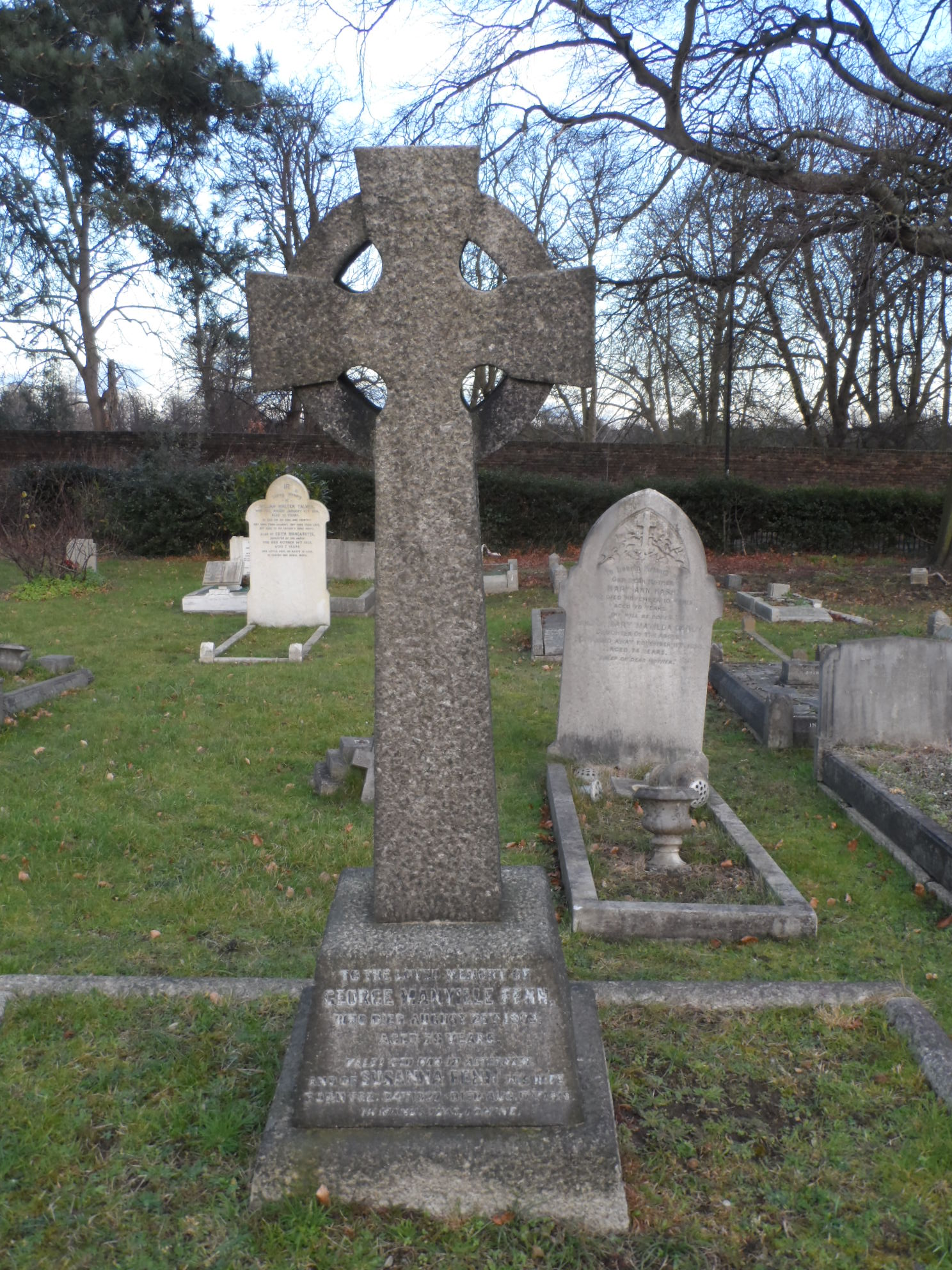
Grave of George Manville Fenn

== War graves ==
The cemetery contains the graves of 30 Commonwealth service personnel of World War I and 28 of World War II.
