= The Wooing and Wedding of a Coon =

1907 comedy film

The Wooing and Wedding of a Coon (1907) is a comedy film made in the United States by Selig Polyscope Company. It is about a nursemaid whose admirer turns out to be a gambling ne'er do well after their marriage, causing her to have to work as a washerwoman to make ends meet. It is "the earliest known American-made film with an all-black cast."

The Jim Crow Museum describes the film as featuring the first "cinematic coon" and as "a stupendously racist portrayal of two dimwitted and stuttering buffoons".

Confusingly, the Selig Polyscope Company also issued a 1905 film of the same name, which the film historians S. Torriano and Venise T. Berry decried as of a genre of films that "denigrate[d] the African image on film to the lowest common denominator," – and which had featured an all-white cast in blackface.
