= James Montgomrey =

Brentford benefactor and timber mill owner (1811 – 1883)

James Montgomrey (1 September 1811 – 4 June 1883) ran a large timber mill in Brentford, Middlesex, that was in the family for 120 years. He also led the development of considerable infrastructure in the town to enhance public amenity.

== Life and family ==
He was the eldest son of James Montgomrey Snr and his wife, Jane, who was the sister of inventor Sir Francis Ronalds and niece of nurseryman Hugh Ronalds of Brentford. After attending John Bullar's school in Southampton, he married Henrietta Sim in 1841 and had seven children. Their daughter Gertrude wed ship-builder Sir Charles Mark Palmer.

James and Henrietta were buried in Isleworth Cemetery. A fountain was erected in James' honour in St Paul’s Recreation Ground in Brentford and there is a memorial to Henrietta in St Mary's Church, Twickenham.

== Timber mill ==
The family's timber mill was located at Montgomrey's Wharf, close to the River Thames and with frontages on Brentford High Street, the River Brent and the Grand Junction Canal. James Snr's cousin William Anthony was first involved in the timber yard in the late 18th century and James Snr entered the business in 1806. He brought James into the partnership in 1836. It remained in the family until 1911, with James' son Archibald Sim Montgomrey being the last proprietor. In James' tenure it was considered to be the largest timber yard in Middlesex and supplied products to surrounding counties. He introduced steam-powered machinery in 1843.

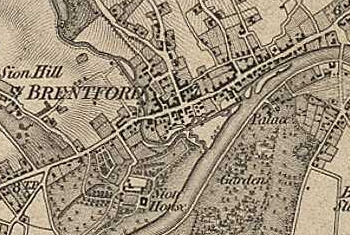
Brentford in 1856. Montgomrey's island, to the east of Syon Park, would become Brentford Dock

In 1855, James sold part of his land to enable construction of Brentford Dock, designed by Isambard Kingdom Brunel to link the Great Western Railway with the Thames. This brought him unprecedented access to the new national rail network for delivery of his timber products.

== Politics ==
The Montgomrey family were active Whigs cum Radicals and James and his father were founding members of the Reform Club. James proposed parliamentary candidates, chaired their campaign committees and spoke at political meetings.

== Public office and philanthropy ==
James was a leader in community activities in Brentford. He served as a magistrate, was appointed Deputy Lieutenant of Middlesex in 1859 and was the inaugural Chairman of the Local Board. He was a director of the company that built the town hall in 1850 and an office-holder of the Mechanics' Institution that his father helped found in 1835. Continuing to support the school established by his father and others in 1834 with the British and Foreign School Society, he served as Treasurer, President and was a major sponsor of the new buildings erected on Brentford High Street in 1859; it was regarded as one of the best schools in London in the ensuing period. His children were still overseeing the school in the early 20th century. In 1868 James was principal subscriber and chairman of the building committee for St Paul's Church and its school, and the same year he spearheaded the creation of the volunteer fire brigade, in which his sons again played leadership roles.
