= Nursery (room) =

Room for infants or small children

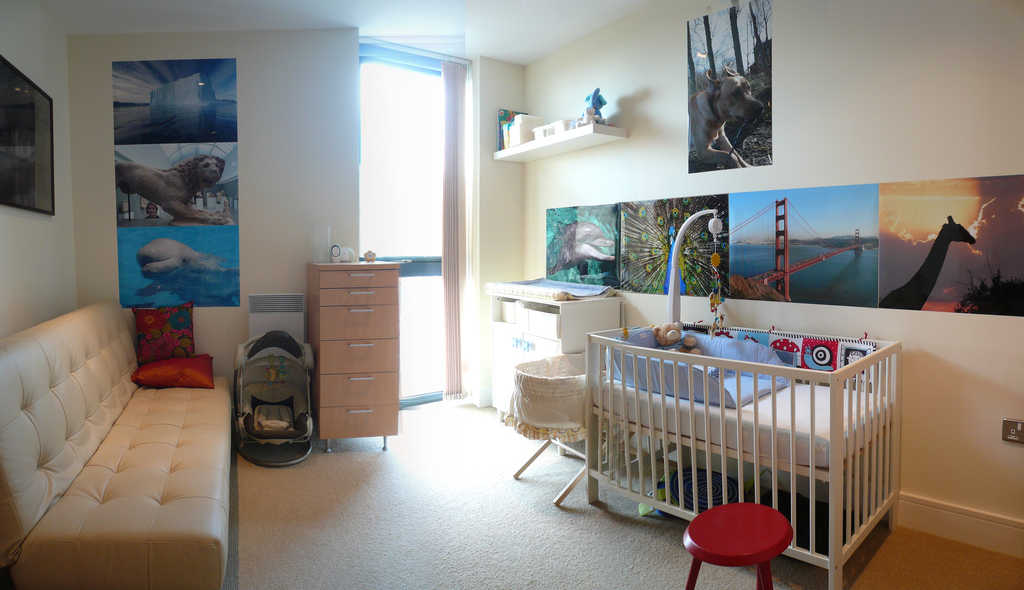
Nursery

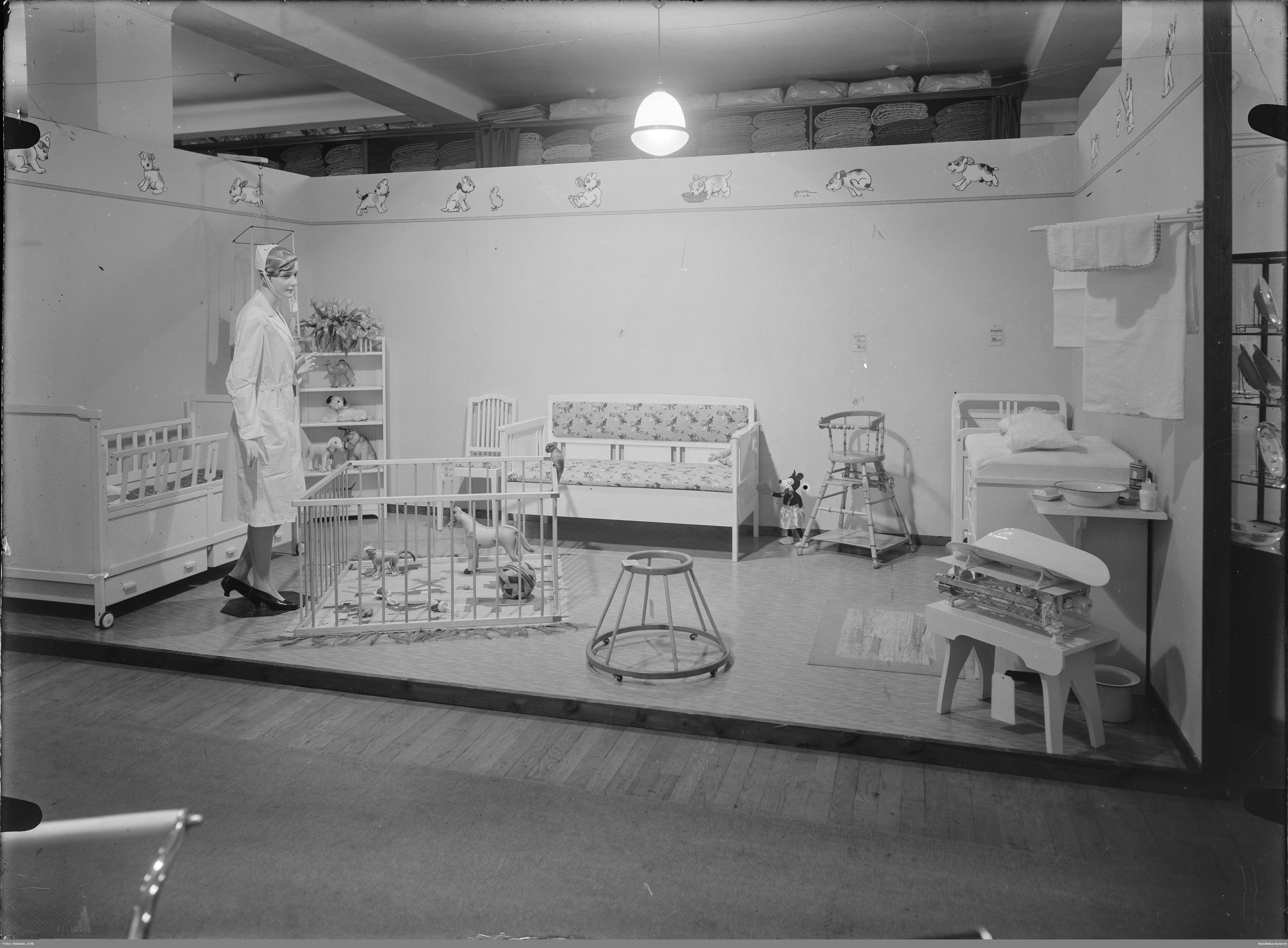
A Swedish 1930s store display of a nursery

A nursery is a bedroom within a house or other dwelling set aside for an infant or toddler.

Historically, European nurseries had little decorations and were away from visitors' sight. An article in the 1842 British Cyclopedia of Domestic Medicine and Surgery instructed the readers to never use a shaded room for a nursery and stressed the importance of ventilation. The author, Thomas Andrew, also suggested using two rooms for the nursery to move between them during the cleaning. He neither encourages nor warns against adding colourful objects into the nursery, simply mentioning that they catch children's attention.

Starting from 1870s, authors such as Mary Eliza Haweis started advocating for a more interactive approach: they stressed the importance of visual stimulation for children's development. As a result, colourful patterned wallpapers appeared on the market. The author of a 1900 article on nursery décor was concerned with the idea that spartan conditions with little ornamentation have a positive impact on children's development, suggesting putting colourful pictures on the walls instead. At the same time, he warned against the excessive use of very bright colours in the night nursery where the child slept. Hermann Muthesius suggested covering the nursery walls with wood panels or washable paint, for hygienic reasons.

In Edwardian times, for the wealthy and mid-tier classes, a nursery was a suite of rooms at the top of a house, including the night nursery, where the children slept, and a day nursery, where they ate and played, or a combination thereof. The nursery suite would include some bathroom facilities and possibly a small kitchen. The nurse (nanny) and nursemaid (assistant) slept in the suite too, to be within earshot of the sleeping children.

A nursery is generally designated for the smallest bedroom in the house, as a baby requires very little space until at least walking age. In 1890, Jane Ellen Panton discouraged organising a nursery in "any small and out-of-the-way chamber", proposing instead to prioritise children's comfort and health by selecting a spacious and well-sunlit room. She highlighted the importance of decorations, suggesting a blue colour palette, simpler furniture and pictures. Patton also wrote that a nursery should contain some medical supplies so that the nurse can tend to the child's ailment before the doctor arrives.

The nursery can remain the bedroom of the child into their teenage years, or until a younger sibling is born, and the parents decide to move the older child into another larger bedroom.

A typical modern nursery contains a cradle or a crib (or similar type of bed), a table or platform for the purpose of changing diapers (also known as a changing table), a rocking chair, as well as various items required for the care of the child (such as baby powder and medicine).

Fictional portrayals of nurseries abound, for example in the writings of Kipling and E. Nesbit, in the 1964 live-action and animated films Mary Poppins and Peter Pan.
