= Tax-deductible loss =

In U.S. tax law

According to the United States Internal Revenue Code certain losses are deductible for tax purposes. To qualify, the loss must not be compensated by insurance and it must be sustained during the taxable year. If the loss is a casualty or theft of personal property of the taxpayer, the loss must result from an event that is identifiable, damaging, and sudden, unexpected, and unusual in nature, not gradual and progressive. Examples are hurricanes, tornadoes, and floods. The loss is reduced by a $100 per event and the total loss might be reduced by the 10% of adjusted gross income floor.

== Case law ==
- Smith v. Commissioner (1939)
