= Closer (film) =

2004 film by Mike Nichols

- Theatrical release poster
- Directed by: Mike Nichols
- Written by: Patrick Marber
- Based on: Closer by Patrick Marber
- Produced by: Mike Nichols; Cary Brokaw; John Calley
- Starring: Julia Roberts; Jude Law; Natalie Portman; Clive Owen
- Cinematography: Stephen Goldblatt
- Edited by: John Bloom; Antonia Van Drimmelen
- Production company: Columbia Pictures
- Distributed by: Sony Pictures Releasing
- Release date: December 3, 2004
- Running time: 104 minutes
- Country: United States
- Language: English
- Budget: $27 million
- Box office: $115.5 million

Closer is a 2004 American romantic drama film directed and produced by Mike Nichols and written by Patrick Marber, based on his award-winning 1997 play. It stars Julia Roberts, Jude Law, Natalie Portman, and Clive Owen. The film, like the play on which it is based, has been seen by some as a modern version of Wolfgang Amadeus Mozart and Lorenzo Da Ponte's 1790 opera Così fan tutte, with references to the opera in both the plot and the soundtrack. Owen starred in the play as Dan, the role played by Law in the film.

Closer received favorable reviews and grossed $115 million at the box office. It was recognized with a number of awards and nominations, including Academy Award nominations and Golden Globe wins for both Portman and Owen for their performances.

== Plot ==
During a busy morning in central London, writer Dan Woolf meets a beautiful American woman after she is hit by a car. She tried to cross and was not used to the direction of traffic in England. On their walk back from the hospital, they stop by Postman's Park. Dan asks her name, which she gives as Alice Ayres. They soon become involved.

One year later, Dan has written a novel based on Alice's life. While being photographed to publicise it, he flirts with the American photographer Anna Cameron. They share a kiss before Alice arrives. While she uses the bathroom, Dan tries to persuade Anna to meet with him, but their conversation is cut short by Alice's return.

Alice asks Anna if she can have her portrait taken as well. She agrees, so Alice asks Dan to leave them alone during the photoshoot. While being photographed, she reveals to Anna that she overheard them. Anna photographs her while she is crying. Alice does not tell Dan what she heard, and their relationship continues, but he spends a year brooding over Anna.

Another year later, Dan enters a cybersex chat room and converses with Larry Gray, a British dermatologist. Still obsessed with Anna, Dan pretends to be her and invites Larry to meet at the aquarium, where he knows Anna often goes. Larry goes to the rendezvous, where he happens to meet her, and learns that he is the victim of a prank. Anna tells Larry that Dan was most likely to blame for the setup. Soon, Anna and Larry become a couple.

Four months later at Anna's photo exhibition, Larry meets Alice, whom he recognises from the displayed photograph of her in tears. Anna had told him that Alice and Dan are a couple. Dan persuades Anna to become involved with him, and they cheat on their respective partners for a year, even after Anna and Larry marry halfway through the year.

Returning from a work trip, Larry tells Anna he has cheated on her with a prostitute. In response, Anna confesses the affair to Larry, while Dan confesses to Alice. Dan and Anna leave their relationships for one another.

Heartbroken, Alice again becomes a stripper. One day, Larry runs into her at the strip club. When he asks her real name, she tells him it is Jane Jones. He asks her to have sex with him, but she refuses.

Later, Larry and Anna meet for coffee so he can sign their divorce papers. He bargains with her – if she sleeps with him, he will sign the documents and thereafter leave her alone. Anna and Dan later meet and, once she reveals the divorce papers have been signed, he realizes she has had sex with Larry. She did it so he would leave them alone, but Dan is furious and does not trust her.

A distraught Dan later confronts Larry to get Anna back. Larry tells him Anna never filed the signed divorce papers and suggests he return to Alice. She takes Dan back and they plan a visit to the United States for a vacation. While in a hotel room at Gatwick Airport celebrating being back together, they talk about how they met.

Bringing up Larry, Dan then asks if she had sex with him. She initially denies it but a short while later, she says she does not love him anymore and that she did sleep with Larry. Dan forgives Alice, but she insists it is over and tells him to leave. The argument culminates in him slapping her.

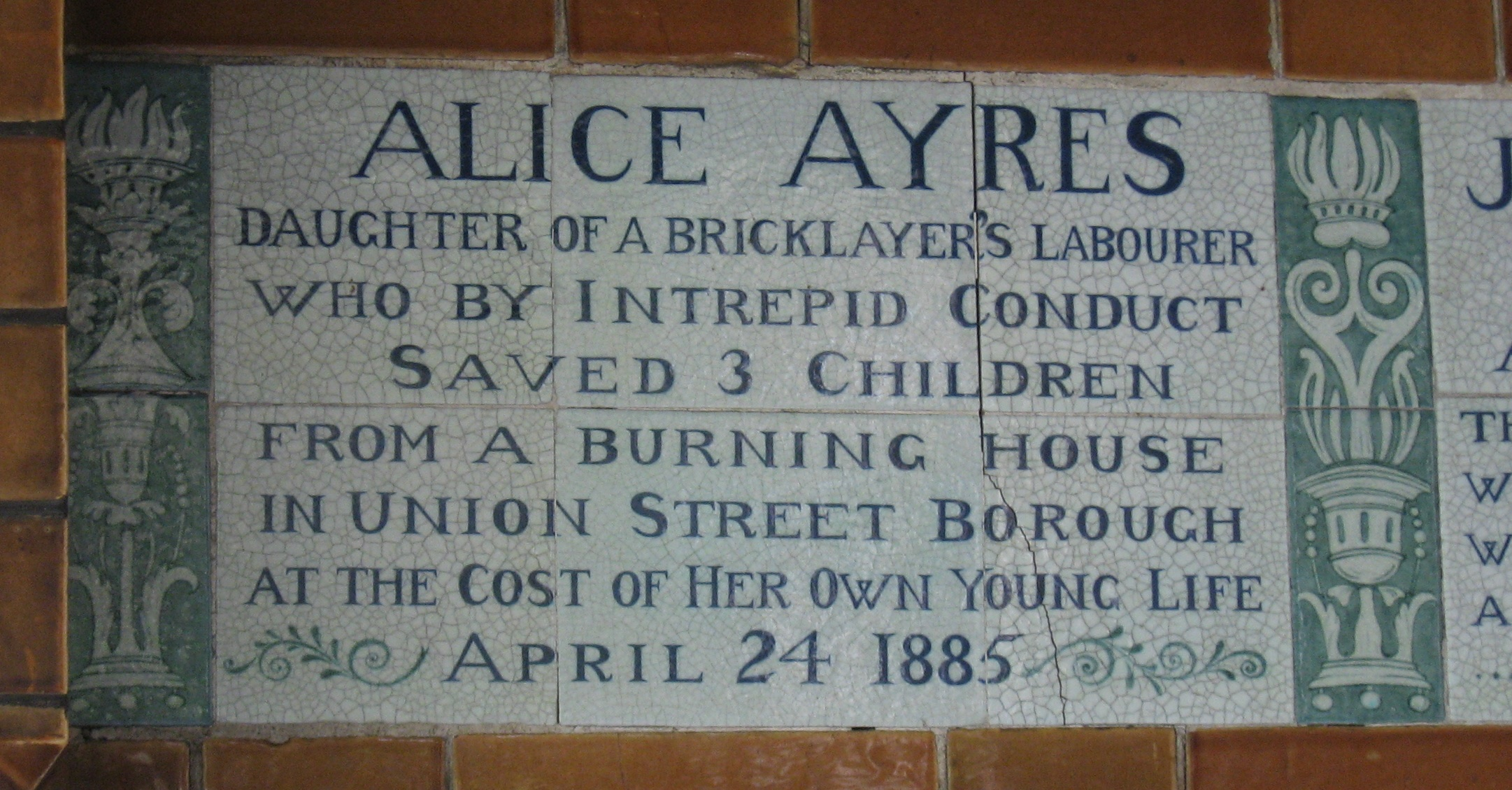
The Alice Ayres tile in the Memorial to Heroic Self-Sacrifice, Postman's Park, London

At the film's end, Larry and Anna are together, and Alice returns to New York City alone. As she passes through the immigration checkpoint on her way back into the States, a shot of her passport shows her real name is Jane Jones, revealing she had lied about her name during her entire four-year relationship with Dan but had told the truth to Larry, even though he did not believe her.

Back in London, Dan returns to Postman's Park and notices the name Alice Ayres on the tiles of the Memorial to Heroic Self-Sacrifice. The Ayres dedication is to a young woman, "who by intrepid conduct" and "at the cost of her own young life," rescued three children from a fire.

The final scene, which resembles the first, shows Alice/Jane walking on a New York street alone being stared at by several of the men around her. She crosses a crosswalk that appears to have a "Don't Walk" signal up.

== Cast ==
- Julia Roberts as Anna Cameron
- Jude Law as Daniel "Dan" Woolf
- Natalie Portman as Alice Ayres / Jane Jones
- Clive Owen as Larry Gray
- Nick Hobbs as Taxi Driver
- Colin Stinton as Customs Officer

== Production ==
=== Filming ===
Cate Blanchett was originally cast in the role of Anna, but had to drop out of the film in September 2003, before filming had begun, when she became pregnant with her second son, Roman.

Closer was filmed at Elstree Film and Television Studios and on location in London.

=== Music ===
The main theme of the film follows Mozart's opera Così fan tutte, with references to that opera in both the plot and the soundtrack. One of the pivotal scenes develops to the background of the overture to Rossini's opera La Cenerentola ("Cinderella"). The soundtrack also contains songs from Jem, Damien Rice and Lisa Hannigan, Bebel Gilberto, the Devlins, the Prodigy and the Smiths.

The music of Irish folk singer Damien Rice is featured in the film, most notably the song "The Blower's Daughter," whose lyrics have parallels to many of the themes in the film. The opening notes from Rice's song "Cold Water" are also used repeatedly, notably in the memorial park scenes. Rice wrote a song titled "Closer" which was intended for use in the film but was not completed in time.

== Reception ==
=== Critical reaction ===
The review aggregator website Rotten Tomatoes gives the film an approval score of 67% based on 207 reviews, and an average rating of 7.0/10. The website's critical consensus states, "Closer's talented cast and Mike Nichols' typically assured direction help smooth a bumpy journey from stage to screen." Another review aggregator, Metacritic, shows a weighted average score of 65 out of 100, based on 42 reviews, indicating "generally favorable" reviews.

Roger Ebert, writing for the Chicago Sun-Times, said of the people involved with the film, "[t]hey are all so very articulate, which is refreshing in a time when literate and evocative speech has been devalued in the movies." Peter Travers, writing for Rolling Stone, said, "Mike Nichols' haunting, hypnotic Closer vibrates with eroticism, bruising laughs and dynamite performances from four attractive actors doing decidedly unattractive things." Kenneth Turan of the Los Angeles Times wrote, "[d]espite involved acting and Nichols' impeccable professionalism as a director, the end result is, to quote one of the characters, 'a bunch of sad strangers photographed beautifully'."

The New York Times' A. O. Scott wrote, "[u]nlike most movie love stories, Closer does have the virtue of unpredictability. The problem is that, while parts are provocative and forceful, the film as a whole collapses into a welter of misplaced intensity." In a review on The Atlantic website, Christopher Orr described the film as "flamboyantly bad" and "irretrievably silly, a potty-mouthed fantasy that somehow mistakes itself for a fearless excavation of the dark recesses of the human soul", suggesting that what might have worked on stage came across as "ostentatious melodrama" on film.

In a review from AllMovie, Perry Seibert praised the acting, the direction and the screenwriting, stating that Clive Owen "finds every dimension in his alpha-male character", Julia Roberts "shows not an ounce of movie-star self-consciousness", Natalie Portman "understands [her character] inside and out" and affirming that "[w]ith his superior timing, Nichols allows each of these actors to hit every funny, cruel, and intimate moment in the script".

=== Box office ===
Closer was released on December 3, 2004, in North America. Closer opened in 476 theaters, but the theater count was increased after the film was released. The film was domestically a moderate financial success, grossing $33,987,757. Huge success followed in the international market, where the film grossed an additional $81,517,270; over 70% of its $115,505,027 worldwide gross. The film was produced on a budget of US$27 million.

=== Awards and nominations ===
Award	Category	Recipient	Result
Academy Awards	Best Supporting Actor	Clive Owen	Nominated
Academy Awards	Best Supporting Actress	Natalie Portman	Nominated
British Academy Film Awards	Best Adapted Screenplay	Patrick Marber	Nominated
British Academy Film Awards	Best Actor in a Supporting Role	Clive Owen	Won
British Academy Film Awards	Best Actress in a Supporting Role	Natalie Portman	Nominated
Golden Globe Awards	Best Motion Picture – Drama	Patrick Marber & Mike Nichols	Nominated
Golden Globe Awards	Best Director	Mike Nichols	Nominated
Golden Globe Awards	Best Screenplay	Patrick Marber	Nominated
Golden Globe Awards	Best Supporting Actor	Clive Owen	Won
Golden Globe Awards	Best Supporting Actress	Natalie Portman	Won
American Screenwriters Association	Discover Screenwriting Award	Patrick Marber	Nominated
National Board of Review	Best Acting by an Ensemble	Jude Law, Clive Owen, Natalie Portman and Julia Roberts	Won
Las Vegas Film Critics Society	Best Supporting Actor	Clive Owen	Won
Broadcast Film Critics Association	Best Acting Ensemble	Jude Law, Clive Owen, Natalie Portman and Julia Roberts	Nominated
Broadcast Film Critics Association	Best Supporting Actor	Clive Owen	Nominated
Broadcast Film Critics Association	Best Supporting Actress	Natalie Portman	Nominated
Online Film Critics Society	Best Adapted Screenplay	Patrick Marber	Nominated
Online Film Critics Society	Best Supporting Actor	Clive Owen	Nominated
Online Film Critics Society	Best Supporting Actress	Natalie Portman	Nominated
Satellite Award	Best Adapted Screenplay	Patrick Marber	Nominated
Satellite Award	Best Supporting Actor – Motion Picture	Clive Owen	Nominated
Satellite Award	Best Supporting Actress – Motion Picture	Natalie Portman	Nominated
Satellite Award	Best Film Editing	John Bloom and Antonia Van Drimmelen	Nominated
New York Film Critics Circle	Best Supporting Actor	Clive Owen	Won
Toronto Film Critics Association	Best Supporting Actor	Clive Owen	Won
San Diego Film Critics Society	Best Supporting Actress	Natalie Portman	Won
Teen Choice Awards	Choice Movie Actress: Drama	Natalie Portman	Nominated

== Home media ==
Closer was first released on VHS and DVD on March 29, 2005, and on Blu-ray on May 22, 2007.

== Popular culture ==
In their debut album, A Fever You Can't Sweat Out, American band Panic! at the Disco named two songs after a quote from this film: "Lying Is the Most Fun a Girl Can Have Without Taking Her Clothes Off" and "But It's Better If You Do."

American rock band Fall Out Boy, in their song "Thnks fr th Mmrs", refers to a scene in the movie where Anna tells her husband Larry what her affair was like: "It tastes like you but sweeter!"
