= Archibald Sim Montgomrey =

British botanist (1843–1922)

- Born: 1843; Brentford, Middlesex
- Died: 12 April 1922 (aged 78–79); Trowbridge, Wiltshire
- Known for: Wholesale timber merchant, county councillor, magistrate and amateur plant collector
- Spouse: Olivia Maria Coward
- Children: 0

Archibald Sim Montgomrey (1843 - 1922) was a wholesale timber merchant, county councillor and magistrate and amateur plant collector in Britain and other parts of the world.

== Personal life ==
Montgomrey was born in Brentford, Middlesex, UK, one of five children. His parents were James Montgomrey and Henrietta Sim, both from families involved with timber through sawmills and broking. Members of his paternal grandmother, Jane Ronalds, family ran a plant nursery in Brentford. The family later moved from Brentford to Hillingdon.

At 16 he was sent for a year's education in Dresden. On his return he joined the family business. He married Olivia Maria Coward in 1870 and they moved to Heston and later Brighton. They had no children and she died on 11 April 1882, at the age of 32. He lived for a further 40 years. He spent the years 1910 - 1911 suffering from serious illness and when he recovered moved to Cheltenham near his widowed sister Agnes. He died on 12 April 1922 at Hilperton Rectory Trowbridge, Wiltshire, the home of his nephew.

== Business career ==
By age 30 he was running the timber mill, and continued to do so, later in collaboration with nephews.

== Community Service and Public Life ==
He served as a Brentford councillor, Middlesex county councillor, magistrate and in the Second Royal Middlesex Militia. He was involved with the funding and development of many public buildings in Brentford, including a hospital, library, fire station, Anglican church and schools.

Montgomrey was also active in several societies, including as a founding member of the British Numismatic Society (1903), elected to the Reform Club (1867), joined the Society for the Encouragement of Arts (1881) and became a Fellow of the Royal Geographical Society (1898).

== Herbarium and Plant Collecting ==
His initial interest in plants was inspired by the Ronalds side of his family. He collected plants from the age of 16 onwards and developed an extensive herbarium of specimens and network of contacts. His specimens from Britain included trees, shrubs, ferns, grasses and herbaceous plants, many from south east England. They included 1,700 dried and mounted specimens now in Bristol Museum and Art Gallery, after being held at Cheltenham Museum Free Library for some years. Some of the specimens provided information for The Historical Flora of Middlesex and Flora of Surrey. Other specimens, particularly those he collected in Gloucestershire, are in the Museum of Gloucester, and he had actively contributed to the Flora of Gloucestershire. His specimens provide records of the distribution of several rare species as well as the first records for others (such as small-flowered catchfly (Silene gallica) in Middlesex and hairlike pondweed (Potamogeton trichoides) in east Gloucester). His records of adder's-tongue spearwort (Ranunculus ophioglossifolius) at Badgeworth, Gloucestershire, indicated the importance of the site, which became a nature reserve in 1933. His specimens are also found within the herbarium at Liverpool World Museum, and also, through ones he donated to colleagues, in Manchester Museum, North Hertfordshire Museum and the University of Birmingham. Montgomrey also collected plants in continental Europe and North America but these do not appear to have survived.

He communicated with other plant collectors including John Wilton Haines, Thomas Alfred Dymes, Harry Joseph Riddelsdell and Lucy Jones James.

In 1911 he joined the Cotteswold Naturalists' Field Club and the Botanical Exchange Club and Society.
