= Emilia Aylmer Blake =

British dramatist, novelist and poet

Emilia Aylmer Gowing (née Blake; 1846–1905), was a British dramatist, novelist and poet.

Blake was born in Bath, Somerset, England, the daughter of a Dublin lawyer. She was educated in England and France. She became known for her recitations and her poetry written for recitation, including her dramatic poem about heroine Alice Ayres. In 1877, Blake married actor William Gowing.

== Works ==
- France Discrowned and other poems, Chapman and Hall, London, (1874)
- The Jewel Reputation
- My Only Love (1880)
- The Cithern Poems for Recitation (1886)
- An Unruly Spirit, V.F. White, London. (1890)
- Boadicea, a play in four acts, K. Paul, Trench, Trübner, London, (1899)
