= Memorial to Heroic Self-Sacrifice =

Memorial in Postman's Park, London

Coordinates: 51°31′0.63″N 0°5′52.17″W

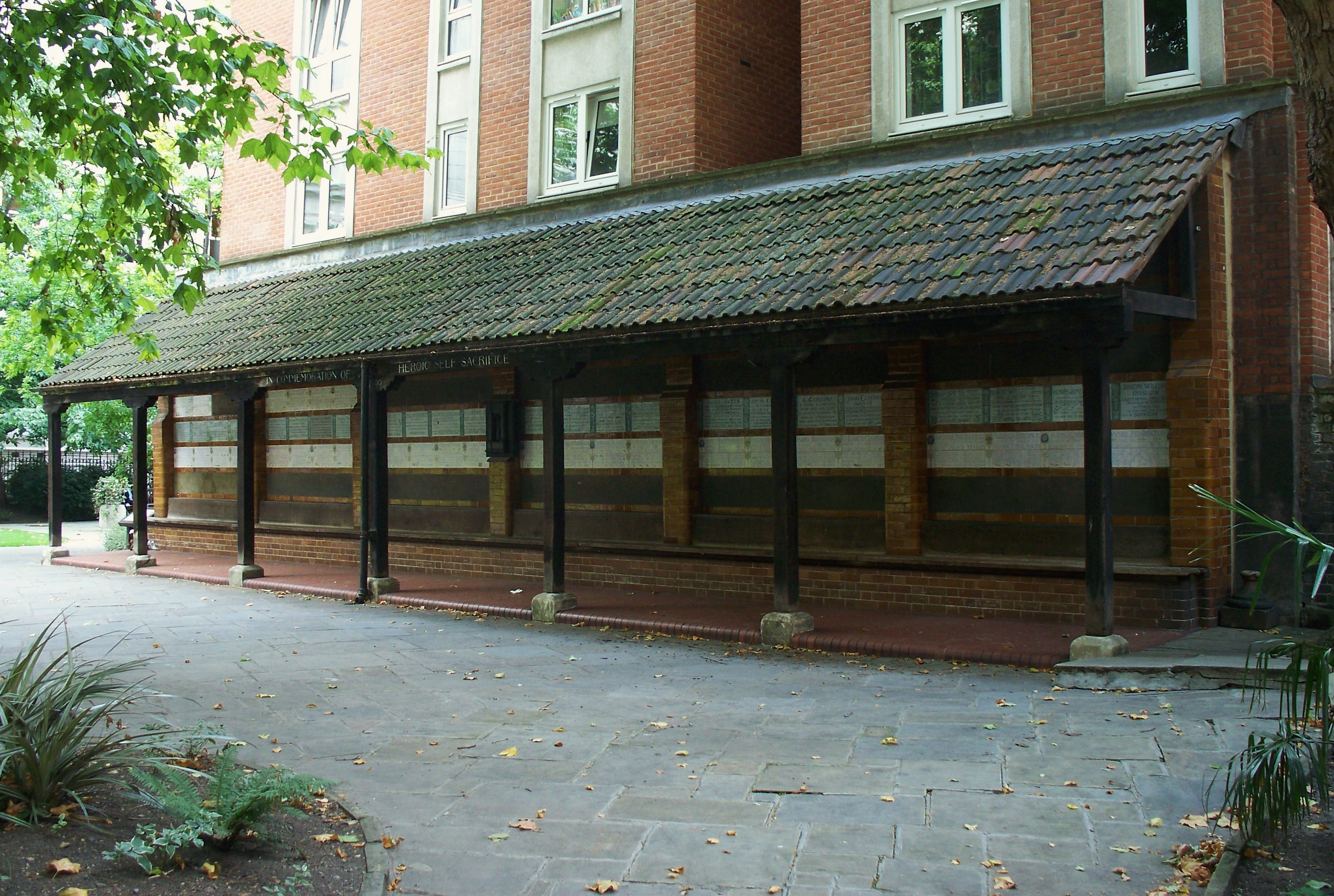
The Memorial to Heroic Self-Sacrifice

Audio description of the memorial by Sir Nicholas Kenyon

The Memorial to Heroic Self-Sacrifice is a public monument in Postman's Park in the City of London, commemorating ordinary people who died saving the lives of others and who might otherwise have been forgotten. It was first proposed by painter and sculptor George Frederic Watts in 1887, to commemorate the Golden Jubilee of Queen Victoria. The scheme was not accepted at that time, and in 1898 Watts was approached by Henry Gamble, vicar of St Botolph's Aldersgate church. Postman's Park was built on the church's former churchyard, and the church was at that time trying to raise funds to secure its future; Gamble felt that Watts's proposed memorial would raise the profile of the park. The memorial was unveiled in an unfinished state in 1900, consisting of a 50-foot (15 m) wooden loggia designed by Ernest George, sheltering a wall with space for 120 ceramic memorial tiles to be designed and made by William De Morgan. At the time of opening, only four of the memorial tiles were in place. Watts died in 1904, and his widow Mary Watts took over the running of the project.

In 1906, after making 24 memorial tablets for the project, William De Morgan abandoned the ceramics business to become a novelist, and the only ceramics firm able to manufacture appropriate further tiles was Royal Doulton. Dissatisfied with Royal Doulton's designs, and preoccupied with the management of the Watts Gallery and Watts Mortuary Chapel in Compton, Surrey, Mary Watts lost interest in the project. Work to complete it was sporadic and ceased altogether in 1931 with only 53 of the planned 120 tiles in place. In 2009, the Diocese of London consented to further additions to the memorial, and the first new tablet in 78 years was added.

The Everyday Heroes of Postman’s Park, a now discontinued mobile app, was published in 2013. It provided a detailed account of the fifty-four incidents commemorated on the Memorial when a visitor scanned its plaque with a handheld device.

== Tablets ==
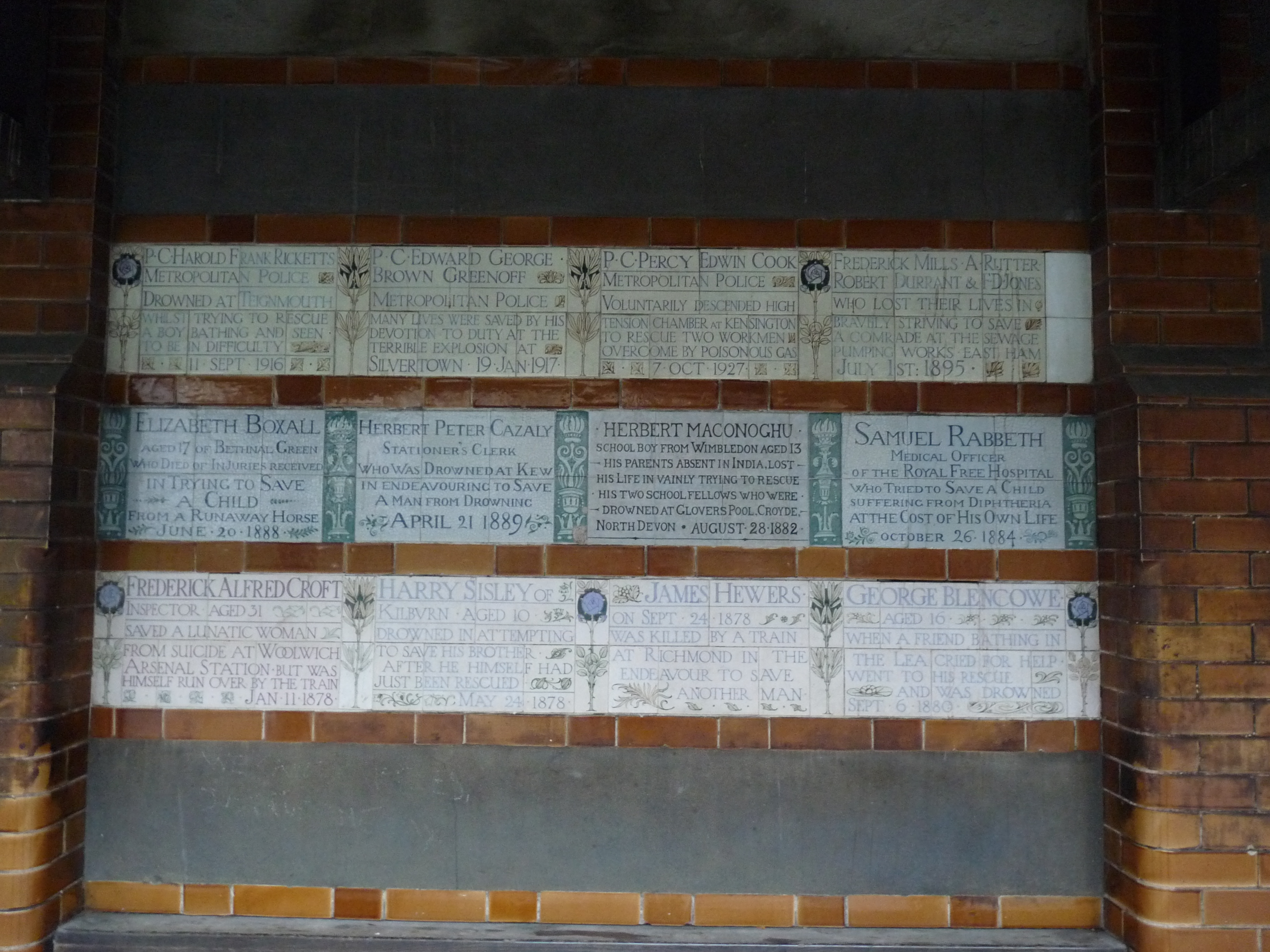
One section of the tablets

The tablets are arranged in three rows, with 24 tablets to De Morgan's original design in the third, central, row, the 24 tablets added in 1908 directly below in the fourth row, and more recent additions above the original tiles in the second row. The first and fifth of the five rows remain empty.

The first four tablets, designed and manufactured by De Morgan and installed in 1900, were each made from two large custom-made tiles. Nine further De Morgan tablets, installed in 1902, were made using standard tiles to reduce costs, and were the last tiles whose installation was overseen by Watts. Eleven more De Morgan tablets, along with T. H. Wren's memorial to Watts, were added in 1905, completing the central row of tablets.

All 24 tablets of the fourth row, designed and manufactured by Royal Doulton, were added as a single batch in August 1908. A single Royal Doulton tablet to PC Alfred Smith was added in June 1919, followed in October 1930 by similar Royal Doulton tablets to three further police officers, and a replacement tablet with the correct details of the East Ham Sewage Works incident of 1895. A single tablet made by Fred Passenger in the original De Morgan style, honouring schoolboy Herbert Maconoghu, was added in April 1931 to fill the gap in the centre row left by the removal of the original, incorrect tablet to the victims of the East Ham Sewage Works incident. In 2009 a 54th tablet was added, in the style of the Royal Doulton tiles, to commemorate print technician Leigh Pitt, the first addition to the wall for 78 years.^{[a]}

Unveiled	Commemorates	Date of death	Row/Col	Image	Designer	Inscription	Notes
30 Jul 1900	Thomas Griffin	12 Apr 1899	3/A	A tablet formed of two large tiles, bordered by green flowers in the style of the Arts and Crafts movement	William De Morgan	Thomas Griffin; Fitters Labourer; 12 April 1899; In a boiler explosion at a Battersea sugar refinery was fatally scalded in returning to search for his mate	
30 Jul 1900	Walter Peart, Harry Dean	18 Jul 1898	3/B	A tablet formed of two large tiles, bordered by green flowers in the style of the Arts and Crafts movement	William De Morgan	Walter Peart, Driver and Harry Dean, Fireman of the Windsor Express on 18 July 1898; Whilst being scalded and burnt sacrificed their lives in saving the train	
30 Jul 1900	Mary Rogers	30 Mar 1899	3/C	A tablet formed of two large tiles, bordered by green flowers in the style of the Arts and Crafts movement	William De Morgan	Mary Rogers; Stewardess of the Stella; 30 Mar 1899; Self sacrificed by giving up her life belt and voluntarily going down in the sinking ship	
30 Jul 1900	George Stephen Funnell	22 Dec 1899	3/D	A tablet formed of two large tiles, bordered by green flowers in the style of the Arts and Crafts movement	William De Morgan	George Stephen Funnell; Police Constable; 22 Dec 1899; In a fire at the Elephant & Castle, Wick Road Hackney Wick, after rescuing two lives went back into the flames, saving a barmaid at the risk of his own life	^{[b]}
4 May 1902	Elizabeth Boxall	20 Jun 1888	3/E	A tablet formed of six standard sized tiles, bordered by green flowers in the style of the Arts and Crafts movement	William De Morgan	Elizabeth Boxall; Aged 17 of Bethnal Green; Who died of injuries received in trying to save a child from a runaway horse 20 June 1888	
4 May 1902	Herbert Peter Cazaly	21 Apr 1889	3/F	A tablet formed of six standard sized tiles, bordered by green flowers in the style of the Arts and Crafts movement	William De Morgan	Herbert Peter Cazaly; Stationer's clerk Who was drowned at Kew in endeavouring to save a man from drowning 21 April 1889	
4 May 1902	Frederick Mills, A. Rutter, Robert Durant, F. D. Jones	1 Jul 1895	2/H	A tablet formed of five tiles of varying sizes, bordered by yellow and blue flowers in an art nouveau style	Royal Doulton	Frederick Mills · A Rutter; Robert Durant & F D Jones; Who lost their lives in bravely striving to save a comrade at the Sewage Pumping Works East Ham; 1 July 1895	^{[c]}
4 May 1902	Samuel Rabbeth	26 Oct 1884	3/H	A tablet formed of six standard sized tiles, bordered by green flowers in the style of the Arts and Crafts movement	William De Morgan	Samuel Rabbeth; Medical Officer; Of the Royal Free Hospital; Who tried to save a child suffering from diphtheria at the cost of his own life 26 October 1884	^{[d]}
4 May 1902	Alice Ayres	26 Apr 1885	3/Q	A tablet formed of six standard sized tiles, bordered by green flowers in the style of the Arts and Crafts movement	William De Morgan	Alice Ayres; Daughter of a bricklayer's labourer Who by intrepid conduct saved 3 children from a burning house in Union Street Borough at the cost of her own young life 24 April 1885	^{[e]}
4 May 1902	John Cranmer Cambridge	8 Aug 1901	3/R	A tablet formed of six standard sized tiles, bordered by green flowers in the style of the Arts and Crafts movement	William De Morgan	John Cranmer Cambridge; Aged 23 a clerk in the London County Council; Who was drowned near Ostend whilst saving the life of a stranger and a foreigner 8 August 1901	
4 May 1902	G. Garnish	7 Jan 1885	3/S	A tablet formed of six standard sized tiles, bordered by green flowers in the style of the Arts and Crafts movement	William De Morgan	G Garnish; A young clergyman Who lost his life in endeavouring to rescue a stranger from drowning at Putney; 7 January 1885	
4 May 1902	John Clinton	16 Jul 1894	3/T	A tablet formed of six standard sized tiles, bordered by green flowers in the style of the Arts and Crafts movement	William De Morgan	John Clinton; Aged 10; Who was drowned near London Bridge in trying to save a companion younger than himself 16 July 1894	
4 May 1902	Joseph William Onslow	5 May 1885	3/X	A tablet formed of six standard sized tiles, bordered by green flowers in the style of the Arts and Crafts movement	William De Morgan	Joseph William Onslow; Lighterman · Who was drowned at Wapping on 5 May 1885; In trying to save a boy's life	^{[f]}
13 Dec 1905	David Selves	12 Sep 1886	3/I	A tablet formed of six standard sized tiles, bordered by green flowers in the style of the Arts and Crafts movement	William De Morgan	David Selves aged 12; Off Woolwich supported his drowning playfellow and sank with him clasped in his arms. 12 September 1886	
13 Dec 1905	William Goodrum	28 Feb 1880	3/J	A tablet formed of six standard sized tiles, bordered by green flowers in the style of the Arts and Crafts movement	William De Morgan	William Goodrum; Signalman · Aged 60; Lost his life at Kingsland Road Bridge in saving a workman from death under the approaching train from Kew; 28 February 1880	
13 Dec 1905	Mrs Yarman	26 Mar 1900	3/K	A tablet formed of six standard sized tiles, bordered by green flowers in the style of the Arts and Crafts movement	William De Morgan	Mrs Yarman wife of George Yarman; Labourer at Bermondsey; Refusing to be deterred from making three attempts to climb a burning staircase to save her aged mother Died of the effects 26 March 1900	
13 Dec 1905	Alexander Stewart Brown	9 Oct 1900	3/L	A tablet formed of six standard sized tiles, bordered by green flowers in the style of the Arts and Crafts movement	William De Morgan	Alex^{r} Stewart Brown of Brockley; Fellow of the Royal College of Surgeons; Though suffering from severe spinal injury the result of a recent accident died from his brave efforts to rescue a drowning man and to restore his life 9 October 1900	
13 Dec 1905	Richard Farris	20 May 1878	3/M	A tablet formed of six standard sized tiles, bordered by green flowers in the style of the Arts and Crafts movement	William De Morgan	Richard Farris Labourer; Was drowned in attempting to save a poor girl who had thrown herself into the canal at Globe Bridge Peckham; 20 May 1878	
13 Dec 1905	George Lee	26 Jul 1876	3/N	A tablet formed of six standard sized tiles, bordered by green flowers in the style of the Arts and Crafts movement	William De Morgan	George Lee Fireman; At a fire in Clerkenwell; Carried an unconscious girl to the Escape falling six times and died of his injuries 26 July 1876	
13 Dec 1905	William Drake	2 Apr 1869	3/O	A tablet formed of six standard sized tiles, bordered by green flowers in the style of the Arts and Crafts movement	William De Morgan	William Drake; Lost his life in averting a Serious Accident to a Lady in Hyde Park; 2 April 1869; Whose horses were unmanageable through the breaking of the carriage pole	
13 Dec 1905	Ellen Donovan	28 Jul 1873	3/P	A tablet formed of six standard sized tiles, bordered by green flowers in the style of the Arts and Crafts movement	William De Morgan	Ellen Donovan of Lincoln Court; Great Wild Street; Rushed into a burning house to save a neighbours children and perished in the flames 28 July 1873	
13 Dec 1905	Sarah Smith	24 Jan 1863	3/U	A tablet formed of six standard sized tiles, bordered by green flowers in the style of the Arts and Crafts movement	William De Morgan	Sarah Smith pantomime artiste at Prince's Theatre; Died of terrible injuries received when attempting in her inflammable dress to extinguish the flames which had enveloped her companion 24 January 1863	
13 Dec 1905	Robert Wright	30 Apr 1893	3/V	A tablet formed of six standard sized tiles, bordered by green flowers in the style of the Arts and Crafts movement	William De Morgan	Robert Wright Police Constable of Croydon; Entered a burning house to save a woman knowing that there was petroleum stored in the cellar – an explosion took place and he was killed 30 April 1893	
13 Dec 1905	Henry James Bristow	30 Dec 1890	3/W	A tablet formed of six standard sized tiles, bordered by green flowers in the style of the Arts and Crafts movement	William De Morgan	Henry James Bristow; Aged eight – at Walthamstow; On 30 December 1890 – saved his little sister's life by tearing off her flaming clothes but caught fire himself and died of burns and shock	^{[g]}
13 Dec 1905	George Frederic Watts	1 Jul 1904	N/A	A dark terracotta relief of a man holding a long partly unrolled scroll	T. H. Wren	The Utmost for the Highest; In memoriam George Frederic Watts, who desiring to honour heroic self-sacrifice placed these records here	^{[h]}
21 Aug 1908	Joseph Andrew Ford	7 Oct 1871	4/A	A tablet formed of five tiles of varying sizes, bordered by yellow and blue flowers in an art nouveau style	Royal Doulton	Joseph Andrew Ford; Aged 30 · Metropolitan Fire Brigade · Saved six persons from fire in Gray's Inn Road but in his last heroic act he was scorched to death 7 Oct 1871	
21 Aug 1908	Amelia Kennedy	18 Oct 1871	4/B	A tablet formed of five tiles of varying sizes, bordered by yellow and blue flowers in an art nouveau style	Royal Doulton	Amelia Kennedy; Aged 19; Died in trying to save her sister from their burning house in Edward's Lane Stoke Newington 18 Oct 1871	
21 Aug 1908	Edmund Emery	31 Jul 1874	4/C	A tablet formed of five tiles of varying sizes, bordered by yellow and blue flowers in an art nouveau style	Royal Doulton	Edmund Emery of 272 King's Road Chelsea; Passenger; Leapt from a Thames steamboat to rescue a child and was drowned 31 July 1874	
21 Aug 1908	William Donald	16 Jul 1876	4/D	A tablet formed of five tiles of varying sizes, bordered by yellow and blue flowers in an art nouveau style	Royal Doulton	William Donald of Bayswater aged 19; Railway clerk Was drowned in the Lea trying to save a lad from a dangerous entanglement of weed 16 July 1876	
21 Aug 1908	Frederick Alfred Croft	11 Jan 1878	4/E	A tablet formed of five tiles of varying sizes, bordered by yellow and blue flowers in an art nouveau style	Royal Doulton	Frederick Alfred Croft; Inspector aged 31; Saved a lunatic woman from suicide at Woolwich Arsenal station but was himself run over by the train 11 Jan 1878	
21 Aug 1908	Harry Sisley	24 May 1878	4/F	A tablet formed of five tiles of varying sizes, bordered by yellow and blue flowers in an art nouveau style	Royal Doulton	Harry Sisley of Kilburn aged 10; Drowned in attempting to save his brother after he himself had just been rescued 24 May 1878	
21 Aug 1908	James Hewers	24 Sep 1878	4/G	A tablet formed of five tiles of varying sizes, bordered by yellow and blue flowers in an art nouveau style	Royal Doulton	James Hewers; On Sept 24 1878; Was killed by a train at Richmond in the endeavour to save another man	
21 Aug 1908	George Blencowe	6 Sep 1880	4/H	A tablet formed of five tiles of varying sizes, bordered by yellow and blue flowers in an art nouveau style	Royal Doulton	George Blencowe; Aged 16; When a friend bathing in the Lea cried for help went to his rescue and was drowned Sept 6 1880	
21 Aug 1908	Ernest Benning	25 Aug 1883	4/I	A tablet formed of five tiles of varying sizes, bordered by yellow and blue flowers in an art nouveau style	Royal Doulton	Ernest Benning; Compositor aged 22; Upset from a boat one dark night off Pimlico Pier; Grasped an oar with one hand supporting a woman with the other but sank as she was rescued 25 Aug 1883	
21 Aug 1908	Thomas Simpson	25 Jan 1885	4/J	A tablet formed of five tiles of varying sizes, bordered by yellow and blue flowers in an art nouveau style	Royal Doulton	Thomas Simpson; Died of exhaustion after saving many lives from the breaking ice at Highgate Ponds; 25 Jan 1885	
21 Aug 1908	William Fisher	12 Jul 1886	4/K	A tablet formed of five tiles of varying sizes, bordered by yellow and blue flowers in an art nouveau style	Royal Doulton	William Fisher; Aged 9 Lost his life on Rodney Road Walworth while trying to save his little brother from being run over 12 July 1886	
21 Aug 1908	George Frederick Simonds	1 Dec 1886	4/L	A tablet formed of five tiles of varying sizes, bordered by yellow and blue flowers in an art nouveau style	Royal Doulton	George Frederick Simonds of Islington; Rushed into a burning house to save an aged widow and died of his injuries 1 Dec 1886	
21 Aug 1908	Samuel Lowdell	25 Feb 1887	4/M	A tablet formed of five tiles of varying sizes, bordered by yellow and blue flowers in an art nouveau style	Royal Doulton	Samuel Lowdell; Bargeman; Drowned when rescuing a boy at Blackfriars; 25 Feb 1887; He had saved two other lives	
21 Aug 1908	William Freer Lucas	8 Oct 1893	4/N	A tablet formed of five tiles of varying sizes, bordered by yellow and blue flowers in an art nouveau style	Royal Doulton	William Freer Lucas; M.R.C.S. L.L.D. at Middlesex Hospital; Risked poison for himself rather than lessen any chance of saving a child's life and died 8 Oct 1893	
21 Aug 1908	Edward Blake	5 Feb 1895	4/O	A tablet formed of five tiles of varying sizes, bordered by yellow and blue flowers in an art nouveau style	Royal Doulton	Edward Blake; Drowned while skating at the Welsh Harp Waters Hendon in the attempt to rescue two unknown girls 5 Feb 1895	
21 Aug 1908	Edward Morris	2 Aug 1897	4/P	A tablet formed of five tiles of varying sizes, bordered by yellow and blue flowers in an art nouveau style	Royal Doulton	Edward Morris; Aged 10; Bathing in the Grand Junction Canal; Sacrificed his life to help his sinking companion 2 Aug 1897	
21 Aug 1908	Godfrey Maule Nicholson, George Elliott, Robert Underhill	12 Jul 1901	4/Q	A tablet formed of five tiles of varying sizes, bordered by yellow and blue flowers in an art nouveau style	Royal Doulton	Godfrey Maule Nicholson; Manager of a Stratford distillery George Elliott and Robert Underhill, workmen Successively went down a well to rescue comrades and were poisoned by gas 12 July 1901	
21 Aug 1908	Solomon Galaman	6 Sep 1901	4/R	A tablet formed of five tiles of varying sizes, bordered by yellow and blue flowers in an art nouveau style	Royal Doulton	Solomon Galaman; Aged 11 died of injuries Sept 6 1901 after saving his little brother from being run over in Commercial Street "Mother I saved him but I could not save myself."	
21 Aug 1908	James Bannister	14 Oct 1901	4/S	A tablet formed of five tiles of varying sizes, bordered by yellow and blue flowers in an art nouveau style	Royal Doulton	James Bannister; Of Bow aged 30; Rushed over when an opposite shop caught fire and was suffocated in the attempt to save life 14 Oct 1901	
21 Aug 1908	Elizabeth Coghlam	1 Jan 1902	4/T	A tablet formed of five tiles of varying sizes, bordered by yellow and blue flowers in an art nouveau style	Royal Doulton	Elizabeth Coghlam; Aged 26; Of Church Path Stoke Newington; Died saving her family and house by carrying blazing paraffin to the yard 1 Jan 1902	
21 Aug 1908	Arthur Regelous, Alice Maud Denman	20 Apr 1902	4/U	A tablet formed of five tiles of varying sizes, bordered by yellow and blue flowers in an art nouveau style	Royal Doulton	Arthur Regelous; Carman ("Little Peter") aged 25 who with Alice Maud Denman aged 27; Died in trying to save her children from a burning house in Bethnal Green 20 April 1902	
21 Aug 1908	Arthur Strange, Mark Tomlinson	25 Aug 1902	4/V	A tablet formed of five tiles of varying sizes, bordered by yellow and blue flowers in an art nouveau style	Royal Doulton	Arthur Strange; Carman of London and Mark Tomlinson; On a desperate venture to save two girls from a quicksand in Lincolnshire were themselves engulfed 25 Aug 1902	
21 Aug 1908	John Slade	26 Dec 1902	4/W	A tablet formed of five tiles of varying sizes, bordered by yellow and blue flowers in an art nouveau style	Royal Doulton	John Slade; Private 4th Batt Royal Fusiliers of Stepney; When his house caught fire saved one man and dashing upstairs to rouse others lost his life 26 Dec 1902	
21 Aug 1908	Daniel Pemberton	17 Jan 1903	4/X	A tablet formed of five tiles of varying sizes, bordered by yellow and blue flowers in an art nouveau style	Royal Doulton	Daniel Pemberton; Aged 61; Foreman L.S.W.R. Surprised by a train when gauging the line hurled his mate out of the track saving his life at the cost of his own 17 Jan 1903	^{[i]}
13 Jun 1919	Alfred Smith	13 Jun 1917	2/A	A tablet formed of five tiles of varying sizes, bordered by yellow and blue flowers in an art nouveau style	Royal Doulton	Alfred Smith; Police Constable; Who was killed in an air raid while saving the lives of women and girls 13 June 1917	
15 Oct 1930	Harold Frank Ricketts	11 Sep 1916	2/E	A tablet formed of five tiles of varying sizes, bordered by yellow and blue flowers in an art nouveau style	Royal Doulton	P.C. Harold Frank Ricketts; Metropolitan Police; Drowned at Teignmouth whilst trying to rescue a boy bathing and seen to be in difficulty 11 Sept 1916	
15 Oct 1930	Edward George Brown Greenoff	19 Jan 1917	2/F	A tablet formed of five tiles of varying sizes, bordered by yellow and blue flowers in an art nouveau style	Royal Doulton	P.C. Edward George Brown Greenoff; Metropolitan Police; Many lives were saved by his devotion to duty at the terrible explosion at Silvertown; 19 Jan 1917	
15 Oct 1930	Percy Edwin Cook	7 Oct 1927	2/G	A tablet formed of five tiles of varying sizes, bordered by yellow and blue flowers in an art nouveau style	Royal Doulton	P.C. Percy Edwin Cook; Metropolitan Police; Voluntarily descended high-tension chamber at Kensington to rescue two workmen overcome by poisonous gas 7 Oct 1927	
Apr 1931	Herbert Maconoghu	28 Aug 1882	3/G	A tablet formed of six standard sized tiles, bordered by green flowers in the style of the Arts and Crafts movement	Fred Passenger	Herbert Maconoghu; School boy from Wimbledon aged 13; His parents absent in India, lost his life in vainly trying to rescue his two school fellows who were drowned at Glovers Pool, Croyde, North Devon; 28 August 1882	^{[j]}
11 Jun 2009	Leigh Pitt	7 Jun 2007	2/B	A tablet formed of five tiles of varying sizes, bordered by yellow and blue flowers in an art nouveau style and decorated with two stylised fish	Royal Doulton	Leigh Pitt; Reprographic operator Aged 30, saved a drowning boy from the canal at Thamesmead, but sadly was unable to save himself 7 June 2007	^{[k]}

== In other media ==
Monument (1980-81), a multimedia installation by the artist Susan Hiller, consists of enlarged photographic replicas of 41 tablets arranged into a new formation, and points towards the neglect and overlooked status of the Memorial at the time. Viewers are invited to sit on a park bench with their back to the photographs and listen on headphones to a soundtrack of the artist speaking on notions of death, memory and heroism. The soundtrack also includes a litany of the commemorated names, noting the time each spent ‘in the body’ versus time ‘as a representation’. Monument is considered a key work of British conceptual art of the period, and has been part of Tate’s collection since 1994.

The tiles dedicated to Alice Ayres became a plot point in the 2004 film, Closer.

In 2010 Canadian band Woodpigeon (band) released the song 'An Entanglement of Weeds' on their BALLADEER / to all the guys i've loved before album. The song was inspired by the monument and references the story of William Donald.

== Notes ==
^{a} Although the memorial had been designed with space for 120 tablets, the Watts Gallery had been hostile to plans to complete it beyond the 53 tablets existing at the time of Mary Watts's death, considering the monument in its unfinished state to be a symbol of the Watts's values and beliefs, and that its status as a historic record of its time is what made it of value.

^{b} The last tablet made using custom tiles; subsequent tablets used standard 6-inch (15 cm) tiles to reduce costs.

^{c} The original William De Morgan tile installed in 1902 incorrectly gave the location as West Ham rather than East Ham, and the date as 1885 instead of 1895. On 15 October 1930, the tablet was removed, and replaced by a tablet made by Royal Doulton that displayed the correct information. As the Royal Doulton tablets were in a different style to those of William De Morgan, the replacement tablet was installed in the second row alongside other Royal Doulton tiles.

^{d} Rabbeth was a doctor at the Royal Free Hospital, treating a four-year-old diphtheria patient. The child was suffering an obstruction to the throat, which doctors were unable to clear, and Rabbeth put his own lips to the tracheotomy tube and sucked the obstruction free despite knowing that he would himself contract the disease as a result. Both Rabbeth and the child died.

^{e} The case of Alice Ayres was the example cited by Watts when he first publicly proposed a memorial to ordinary heroes. The memorial tablet to Alice Ayres forms a key plot element in the 2004 film Closer.

^{f} The last of the tablets to be added in George Frederic Watts's lifetime

^{g} The last tablet designed by William De Morgan, who in 1906 gave up the ceramic business to become a novelist

^{h} Commissioned by Mary Watts and Henry Gamble, vicar of St Botolph's Aldersgate. Designed by T. H. Wren, a student of the school of arts and crafts established by Watts in Compton, Surrey. The plaque is situated on a central column, in the third row between the tablets to Alexander Stewart Brown and Richard Farris.

^{i} The last tablet to be added from the list of names proposed by George Frederic Watts before his death

^{j} Commissioned by Mary Watts from Fred Passenger, a former employee of De Morgan who had set up his own ceramics business using De Morgan designs, to fill the gap in the third row left by the removal of the original tablet to the victims of the East Ham Sewage Works accident. The last memorial to be installed in Mary Watts's lifetime. The exact date of installation is unknown.

^{k} Leigh Pitt, a print technician from Surrey, had died on 7 June 2007 rescuing nine-year-old Harley Bagnall-Taylor, who was drowning in a canal in Thamesmead. His colleague Jane Shaka approached the Diocese of London to suggest that Pitt would make a suitable addition to the memorial, and despite previous opposition from the Watts Gallery to proposals to complete the memorial, on 11 June 2009 this tablet was added to the Memorial to Heroic Self-Sacrifice, the first new tablet added to the memorial since that of Herbert Maconoghu 78 years earlier.
