= Society for the Protection of Life from Fire =

The Society for the Protection of Life from Fire was formed in 1836 for the purposes of preserving life from fire by providing fire escapes, (i.e. portable extending ladders) and attendants at around seventy London locations. In 1865 the Society, including its equipment and staff, was incorporated into the fire brigade run by the Metropolitan Board of Works, the precursor of the modern London Fire Brigade. The Society has continued to exist and now recognises people who perform acts of bravery in rescuing others from the life-threatening effects of fires in the United Kingdom.

== History ==
The Society for the Protection of Life from Fire was formed in 1836, it received royal patronage in 1837 but lost it again in 1901 when King Edward VII declined to renew it after the death of Queen Victoria. In its 1837 annual report, the society stated its purpose as "the preservation of Life from Fire, by organising a body of men who shall be provided with… public fire escapes… and also by exciting Fireman, Policemen and others to a prompt attention to the scene of danger – by holding out rewards, as the merit of the case may deserve". Its main work at this time was the provision and maintenance of fire escapes at around seventy central London locations.

This extract from Cruchley's London in 1865: A Handbook for Strangers outlines the work undertaken by the Society:

The Society maintains, in different parts of the Metropolis, 73 fire-escape stations, usually at distances of about half a mile from each other. At each station there is a fire-escape, attended throughout the night by a conductor well instructed in its use, and provided with all necessary implements. From 1843 to March 31, 1861, the Society's fire-escapes have attended no less than 5211 fires, and rescued 670 lives. The fire-escape in use is Abraham Wivell's; its height varies from 43 ft. to 45 ft., and by means of a supplemental ladder even 60 feet can, if necessary, be obtained. Each machine weighs 8½ cwt., and costs £60.

In 1865 the Metropolitan Fire Brigade Act placed the responsibility of providing an efficient fire brigade onto the Metropolitan Board of Works and the equipment and staff of the society were absorbed into the new organisation. Consequently, by 1908 the remit of the society had changed, and was now stated as, "promoting the Protection of Life from Fire, by the grant of rewards for saving life from fire, to persons who shall have distinguished themselves or received injury while engaged in the rescue of life from fire". This definition of its work, with an emphasis on the risk to life or exertions of the rescuer rather than just the attempt to save life, placed the organisation into the realms of recognising heroism, rather than simply promoting or endorsing lifesaving.

This sentiment was originally suggested by one of the five "specific objects" of the society which was, "to bestow rewards, at the discretion of the Society, on such persons as shall at any time distinguish themselves by their endeavours to save human life in case of fire". These awards included certificates, watches, monetary awards and in particularly meritorious cases, a medal. The medal, which was awarded in silver and bronze, shows a group of figures undertaking a rescue from a fire on the obverse and a design of oak branches encircling the words "duty and honor" and "the Society for the Protection of Life from Fire" on the reverse.

The quantity, scope and reach of the society's awards can be ascertained by looking at a particular period. For example, between 1908 and 1914, the Society recognised 547 individuals with awards including eighty-one bronze medals, forty-six silver medals, eighteen silver watches and 293 certificates. The Society made awards to women far more often than any other comparable organisation recognising heroic acts. This may have been because fires often took place in domestic settings where women were more present or because of the flammable nature of women's clothing.

In addition to lifesaving, awards were also presented in relation to the design or construction of new fire escape equipment and to individuals who were the first to bring existing equipment to the scene of a fire. However, it was the awards for directly saving life, and at personal risk, which were most admired. At one 1837 presentation ceremony, for the bestowal of silver medals for "praiseworthy conduct", it was noted that, "presenting the medals to the persons to whom they were awarded, produced a gratifying and interesting sensation on the minds of the assembly, which was very numerous; and those who received them… returned thanks, appearing to value them as an inestimable treasure".

== Present day ==
The Society has continued to exist and now recognises people who perform acts of bravery in rescuing others from the life-threatening effects of fires in the United Kingdom. It encourages police forces and fire brigades to report such acts and to nominate, for formal recognition by the Society, those who act heroically in fires. The Society's awards normally take the form of a framed certificate testifying to 'distinguished conduct while engaged in the rescue of life from fire' or in especially meritorious cases, a medal is awarded. For people under the age of 16 there can also be a small monetary award.

The principal consideration for the Society's Trustees, when considering nominations, is that the persons nominated must have exposed themselves to the hazard of fire and smoke while attempting to rescue one or more people. Nominations are accepted from chief constables and chief fire officers in the United Kingdom or senior police or fire brigade officers. In exceptional cases, nomination from a third party may also be considered. While they always consider exceptional cases, the Trustees do not normally make awards to a close relation of a victim, someone receiving another national award, or a serving fire officer or police officer, unless they were off-duty or their action was above and beyond what is expected in the normal course of their duty.

The Society's records, up to and including 1998, were previously stored at Guildhall Library in the City of London and are now kept at London Metropolitan Archives (LMA).
