= Nursemaid =

Female domestic worker who cares for children

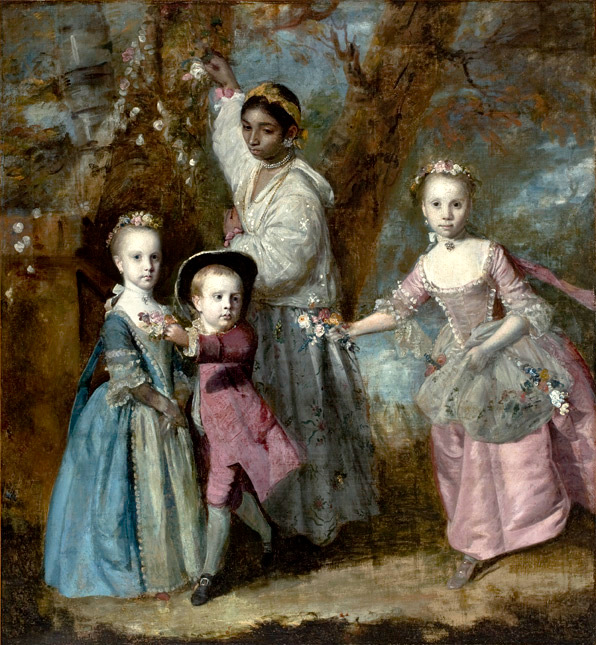
An Indian nursemaid (ayah) with her British charges, painted by Sir Joshua Reynolds

A nursemaid (or nursery maid) is a mostly historical term for a female domestic worker who cares for children within a large household. The term implies that she is an assistant to an older and more experienced employee, a role usually known as nurse or nanny. A family wealthy enough to have multiple servants looking after the children would have a large domestic staff, traditionally within a strict hierarchy, and a large house (or possibly several, such as the townhouse and country house) with nursery quarters.

== History ==
The term 'nursemaid' has wide historical use, mostly related to servants charged with the actual care of children. In ancient usage, the terms 'nursemaid' and 'nurse' (as, for example, the character in Shakespeare's Romeo and Juliet) are largely interchangeable. Everything that a parent ordinarily might do, especially the more onerous tasks, could be turned over to a nursemaid. Feeding very young children and supervising somewhat older children at meal times, seeing that the children are dressed properly, watching over the children as they play outside, and other such tasks could be left to a nursemaid.

== Victorian nursery maid ==
The title 'Nursery Maid' refers to a specific role within the hierarchy of a great house. In the 21st century, the position is largely defunct, owing to the relatively small number of households who maintain large staffs with the traditional hierarchy. In the Victorian household, the children's quarters were referred to as the 'nursery', but the name of the responsible servant had largely evolved from 'nurse' to 'nanny'. The Nursery Maid was a general servant within the nursery, and although regularly in the presence of the children, would often have a less direct role in their care. The nursery maid reported to the nanny (or nurse) and assisted her in taking care of the children of the employer's family, her duties including tidying and maintaining the nursery, lighting the nursery fires, and carrying meals, laundry, and hot water between the nursery, kitchen, and scullery. It was a junior role for young girls, working under the supervision of the experienced and usually older nanny. Nursery Maids wore a uniform, similar to the other maids in the household. In 1845 the satirical magazine Punch published a guide to domestic servants in which it suggested that any girl could undertake the duties of a Nursery Maid, as every girl had the requisite training of "snubbing and slapping" either her own siblings, or the siblings of other people. Domestic service agencies supplied nursery maids and sometimes gave basic training, for which popular manuals were also published.

== Relationships ==
By reason of their close involvement in most if not all the daily affairs of the children, including maintaining proper standards of behaviour, nannies and nursemaids might easily establish the close kind of relationship with the children that a mother would herself ordinarily form. In many cases this could lead to nannies being retained on the staff even after the children had grown up, or to nursemaids continuing to hold a responsible role for the adult child as a type of chaperone, as in the example of Juliet's nurse.

== See also ==
- Amah or ayah, a woman who cares for babies and children; sometimes used for a general domestic worker
- Babysitting, informal childcare
- Governess, a woman hired to teach children within their home
- Wet nurse, a woman hired to breastfeed and care for a baby
