= List of London Monopoly locations =

Standard British Monopoly board locations

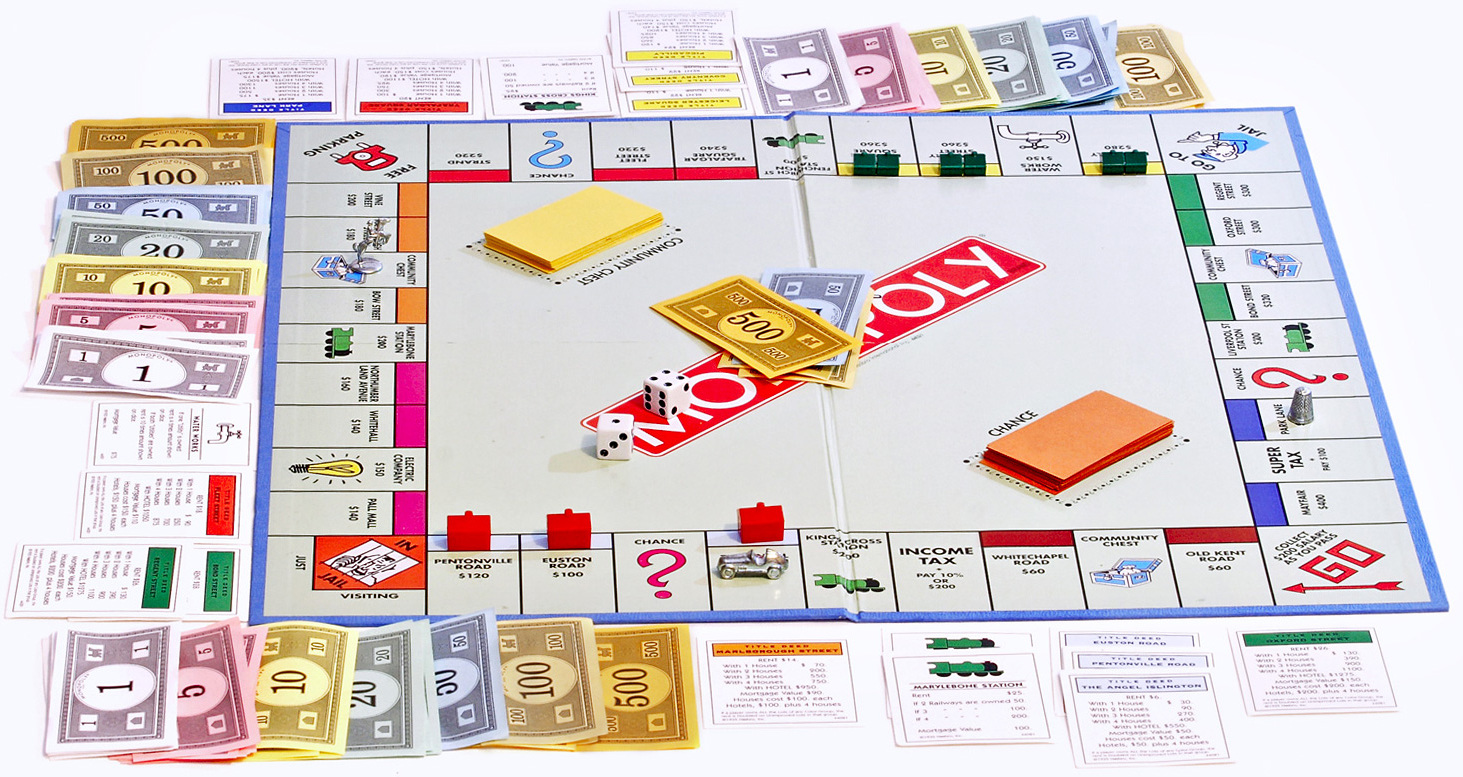
A standard British Monopoly board, featuring locations in London

The locations on the standard British version of the board game Monopoly are set in London and were selected in 1935 by Victor Watson, managing director of John Waddington Limited. Watson became interested in the board game after his son Norman had tried the Parker Brothers original US version and recommended the company produce a board for the domestic market. He took his secretary Marjory Phillips on a day-trip from the head offices in Leeds to London and the pair looked for suitable locations to use.

The London version of the game was successful, and in 1936 it was exported to Continental Europe, Australia, New Zealand and South Africa, becoming the de facto standard board in the British Commonwealth. It became such a success in the UK that Waddingtons ran Monopoly competitions in locations depicted on the board; one such contest was held on platforms 3 and 4 of Fenchurch Street station. The resulting board has been perennially popular around the world, with the chosen locations becoming familiar to millions. Tourists from as far as Canada, Singapore and Saudi Arabia have been known to visit specific locations in London because of their presence on the Monopoly board. In 2003, Watson's grandson (also called Victor Watson) unveiled a plaque at what is now a branch of The Co-operative Bank, the original location of the Angel, Islington, to commemorate the elder Watson's contribution to British popular culture.

The set has been celebrated by the Monopoly pub crawl, which attempts to visit all the locations on the board and have a drink at a pub in each one. The relative wealth of the various places has changed slightly. Whitechapel Road is now the cheapest (as opposed to Old Kent Road) but Mayfair remains the most expensive; in 2016 an estimate by loan provider West One showed the average house price on each was £590,000 and £3,150,000 respectively.

== Locations ==
The final list mixes well-known landmarks with relatively obscure locations. There appears to be no specific motivation for how they were chosen; when the travel writer Tim Moore searched the Waddingtons' company archives he did not uncover any relevant documentation.

The light blue set are all part of the London Inner Ring Road, this section of which opened in 1756 as the New Road. From west to east the road runs as Euston Road to King's Cross, then Pentonville Road to the Angel, Islington. The three streets in the pink (or purple) set all converge at Trafalgar Square, and the red set are all adjacent to each other as part of the A4 road, a major road running west from Central London. The orange set is related to locations dealing with the police and law. The yellow set has an entertainment and nightlife-based theme; Leicester Square is known for cinemas and theatres, Coventry Street for clubs and restaurants, and Piccadilly for hotels. The streets in the green set have a background in retail and commercial properties.

The stations were the four London termini of the London and North Eastern Railway, principally King's Cross, which served Waddingtons' home town of Leeds. Original Monopoly boards manufactured before the Transport Act 1947 and the nationalisation of the railways use the name "L.N.E.R." on each title deed card; later boards showed "British Railways" instead.

Some elements of the US board were unchanged, leading to apparent idiosyncrasies. The police officer on Go To Jail is wearing a New York City Police Department hat, not a Metropolitan Police helmet, while the car on Free Parking has a Whitewall spare tyre, which was uncommon in the UK. The term Community Chest was a welfare support system present in the Great Depression and has not been used in Britain.

London Monopoly board layout

| Free Parking | Strand £220 | Chance ? | Fleet Street £220 | Trafalgar Square £240 | Fenchurch Street station £200 | Leicester Square £260 | Coventry Street £260 | Water Works £150 | Piccadilly £280 | Go To Jail |
| Vine Street £200 | MONOPOLY | | | | | | | | | Regent Street £300 |
| Marlborough Street £180 | MONOPOLY | | | | | | | | | Oxford Street £300 |
| Community Chest | MONOPOLY | | | | | | | | | Community Chest |
| Bow Street £180 | MONOPOLY | | | | | | | | | Bond Street £320 |
| Marylebone station £200 | MONOPOLY | | | | | | | | | Liverpool Street station £200 |
| Northumberland Avenue £160 | MONOPOLY | | | | | | | | | Chance ? |
| Whitehall £140 | MONOPOLY | | | | | | | | | Park Lane £350 |
| Electric Company £150 | MONOPOLY | | | | | | | | | Super Tax (pay £100) |
| Pall Mall £140 | MONOPOLY | | | | | | | | | Mayfair £400 |
| In Jail/Just Visiting | Pentonville Road £120 | Euston Road £100 | Chance ? | The Angel, Islington £100 | King's Cross station £200 | Income Tax (pay £200) | Whitechapel Road £60 | Community Chest | Old Kent Road £60 | Collect £200 salary as you pass GO |

Note: the table excludes the non-specific "Go", "Jail", "Electric Company", "Free Parking", "Water Works" and "Go To Jail" squares. Chance and Community Chest squares are also omitted.

| Colour | Image | Name | Value | House price (game) | House price (2016) | Location | Notes |
|---|---|---|---|---|---|---|---|
| Brown (Note: Original British Monopoly boards have Old Kent Road and Whitechapel Road in a dark purple group, rather than brown.) | Looking south along Old Kent Road from the Bricklayer's Arms | Old Kent Road | £60 | £30 | £813,000 | SE1; SE14 | The only location south of the River Thames; also the only one both outside and more than one tube stop away from the Circle line. |
| Brown | Looking east on Whitechapel Road, near Whitechapel tube station and street market. | Whitechapel Road | £60 | £30 | £590,000 | E1 | |
| Station | King's Cross station frontage following restoration in 2014. | King's Cross station | £200 | N/A | £782,000 | NW1 | Principal services: Glasgow Central (historic), Edinburgh Waverley, Sunderland, Newcastle, York, Leeds |
| Light blue | View of The Angel, Islington on the corner of Islington High Street | The Angel, Islington | £100 | £50 | £866,000 | N1 | The Angel is a former pub, not a street. It was a Lyons Corner House in 1935 and is reportedly where Watson and Phillips stopped for lunch. |
| Light blue | Junction of Euston Road and Euston Square | Euston Road | £100 | £50 | £1,080,000 | W1; NW1 | |
| Light blue | Pentonville Road, London, looking at a block of flats | Pentonville Road | £120 | £60 | £866,000 | N1 | |
| Pink | View of Pall Mall, London, with old buildings | Pall Mall | £140 | £70 | £1,380,000 | SW1 | |
| Pink | Whitehall, featuring the Monument to the Women of World War II and the Cenotaph, near Big Ben | Whitehall | £140 | £70 | £1,390,000 | SW1 | |
| Pink | The Playhouse Theatre on Northumberland Avenue | Northumberland Avenue | £160 | £80 | £1,280,000 | SW1 | |
| Station | The frontage of Marylebone Station, London | Marylebone station | £200 | N/A | £1,100,000 | NW1 | Principal services: Birmingham Snow Hill, Oxford, Aylesbury, Sheffield Victoria (historic) |
| Orange | Bow Street, looking north towards the former Bow Street Magistrates' Court | Bow Street | £180 | £90 | £1,280,000 | WC2 | |
| Orange | View of Liberty department store on Great Marlborough Street | Great Marlborough Street (listed as Marlborough Street) | £180 | £90 | £2,480,000 | W1 | There is no actual Marlborough Street in this part of London; the square on the board was misnamed after the Marlborough Street Magistrates Court. |
| Orange | Road sign at the end of Vine Street near Piccadilly | Vine Street | £200 | £100 | £1,700,000 | W1 | The shortest street on the board; it is 70 feet (21 m) long. Since Vine Street has no pubs, a typical Monopoly pub crawl visits the connecting Swallow Street instead. |
| Red | The Strand, looking towards Trafalgar Square and the Admiralty Arch | Strand | £220 | £110 | £2,160,000 | WC2 | |
| Red | View of Fleet Street, with St Paul's Cathedral in the background | Fleet Street | £220 | £110 | £1,080,000 | EC4 | |
| Red | Trafalgar Square, showing a fountain in the foreground and the National Gallery | Trafalgar Square | £240 | £120 | £1,280,000 | WC2 | |
| Station | Main entrance to Fenchurch Street station | Fenchurch Street station | £200 | N/A | £1,430,000 | EC3 | Principal services: Southend Central |
| Yellow | Centre of Leicester Square, following redevelopment in 2012 | Leicester Square | £260 | £130 | £1,280,000 | WC2 | |
| Yellow | Looking eastwards on Coventry Street towards the Trocadero shopping centre | Coventry Street | £260 | £130 | £1,900,000 | W1 | |
| Yellow | View of Piccadilly by the Meriden Hotel, looking towards Piccadilly Circus | Piccadilly | £280 | £140 | £2,000,000 | W1 | |
| Green | Looking north along Regent Street, with Union Flags hung between buildings | Regent Street | £300 | £150 | £1,700,000 | W1 | |
| Green | Looking west along Oxford Street, with two buses and Selfridges department store | Oxford Street | £300 | £150 | £1,300,000 | W1 | |
| Green | New Bond Street, showing a zebra crossing across the road | Bond Street | £320 | £160 | £806,000 | W1 | There is no actual Bond Street; it is split into New Bond Street to the north and Old Bond Street to the south. |
| Station | Interior view of Liverpool Street station's main concourse | Liverpool Street station | £200 | N/A | £784,000 | EC2 | Principal services: Norwich, Cambridge, Stansted Airport, Southend Victoria |
| Dark blue | View of Park Lane, showing Hyde Park and the Grosvenor House Hotel | Park Lane | £350 | £175 | £1,700,000 | W1 | |
| Dark blue | Grosvenor Square, Mayfair, looking towards a luxury hotel | Mayfair | £400 | £200 | £3,150,000 | W1 | Not a street, but a location in London (between Piccadilly, Regent Street, Oxford Street and Park Lane). The most expensive square on the board, and in reality. |
