= Tantalus (disambiguation) =

Tantalus is a Greek mythological figure who is bound in a pool of water in Tartarus, forever thirsty but never able to drink.

Tantalus may also refer to:

== People from mythology ==
- Tantalus, son of Thyestes, killed, along with his brother Pleisthenes, by his uncle Atreus, father of Agamemnon
- Tantalus, one of the Niobids, children of King Amphion of Thebes and Niobe, daughter of Tantalus.

== Places ==
- 2102 Tantalus, an asteroid
- Mount Tantalus, southwestern British Columbia, Canada
- Tantalus Bluffs, Dufek Coast, Antarctica
- Tantalus Formation, a Mesozoic geologic formation
- Tantalus (Oahu), a peak on the Hawaiian island of Oʻahu
- Tantalus Peak, Victoria Land, Antarctica
- Tantalus Range, a mountain range in southwestern British Columbia

=== Fictional locations ===
- Tantalus, a prison colony in the 1966 Star Trek episode "Dagger of the Mind"

== Animals ==
- Abisara tantalus, a butterfly of the family Riodinidae
- Aellopos tantalus, a moth of the family Sphingidae
- Lepidochrysops tantalus, a butterfly of the family Lycaenidae
- Mecyclothorax tantalus, a ground beetle of the family Carabidae
- Tantalus monkey (Chlorocebus tantalus), a species endemic to Ghana, Sudan, and Kenya

== Narratives ==
- "The Torment of Tantalus" (Stargate SG-1), a 1997 TV series episode
- Tantalus, A 1999 play written by John Barton and directed by Peter Hall

== Transportation and vehicles ==
- USS Tantalus (ARL-27), a United States Navy landing craft repair ship of World War II
- HMS Tantalus (P318), a British T-class submarine of World War II

== Other uses ==
- Tantalus (cabinet), a cabinet for displaying decanters but securing their contents
- Tantalus Media, an Australian video game development studio

== See also ==
- Tantalum (element "Ta"), a metallic element
- Tantalis
- Tantalize (disambiguation)
