= Angel, London =

Coordinates: 51.5321°N 0.1066°W

Angel
- Area
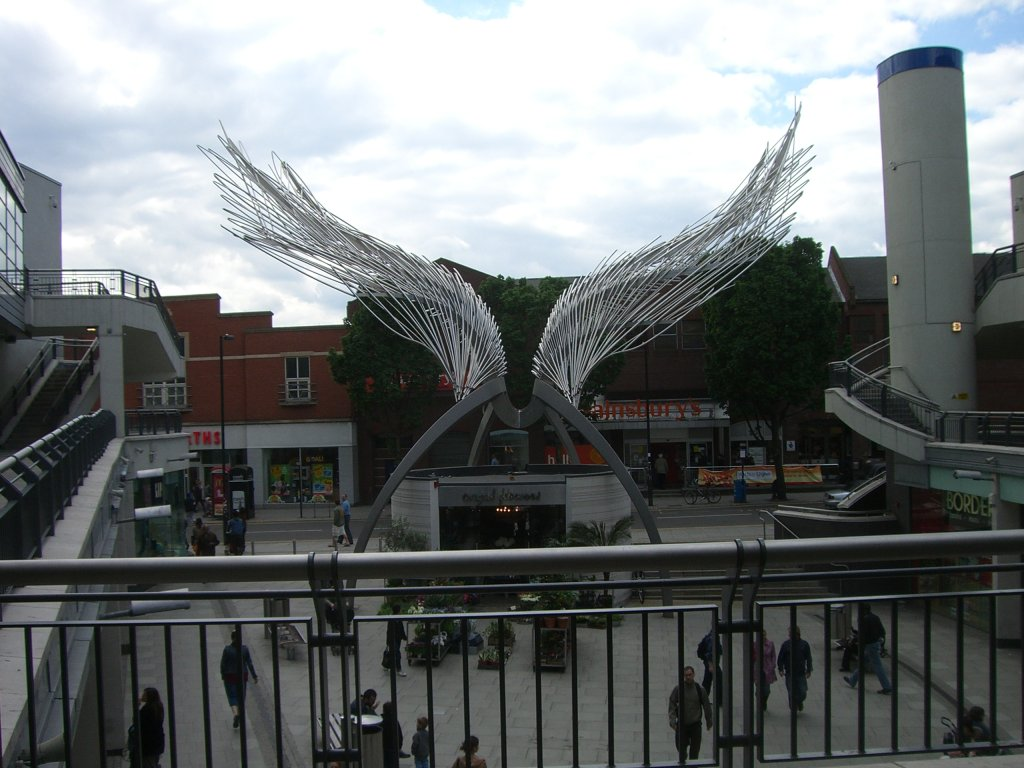
- Angel Wings sculpture by Wolfgang and Heron with Price & Myers

- Location within Greater London
- OS grid reference: TQ315845
  - Charing Cross: 2 mi (3.2 km) SSW
- London borough: Islington
- Ceremonial county: Greater London
- Region: London
- Country: England
- Sovereign state: United Kingdom
- Post town: LONDON
- Postcode district: N1
- Postcode district: EC1
- Dialling code: 020
- Police: Metropolitan
- Fire: London
- Ambulance: London
- UK Parliament: Islington South and Finsbury
- London Assembly: North East

Angel is an area on the northern fringes of Central London within the London Borough of Islington. It is 2 miles (3.2 km) north-northeast of Charing Cross on the Inner Ring Road at a busy transport intersection. The area is identified in the London Plan as one of 35 major centres in London. It is a significant commercial and retail centre, and a business improvement district. Angel straddles the ancient boundary of the parishes of Clerkenwell and Islington that later became the metropolitan boroughs of Finsbury and Islington. It is named from the former Angel Inn which stood on the corner of Islington High Street and Pentonville Road. Since 1965 the whole area has formed part of the London Borough of Islington in Greater London.

== History ==
=== Toponymy ===
The area is named after the Angel Inn, which existed from the 17th century.

=== Local government ===
The boundary of the ancient parishes of Clerkenwell and Islington cut through the area. The southern part of Liverpool Road and the western side of Islington High Street, including the Angel Inn were in the parish of Clerkenwell. Despite this, both parts were considered to form part of the town of Islington. There is a traditional story that a pauper died in Islington and had to be taken to Clerkenwell for burial, which caused the land to be forfeited. The parishes were located outside the City of London. As they became populated suburbs of the city this was reflected in the addition of Clerkenwell in 1604 and Islington in 1636 to the bills of mortality weekly statistical returns. The parishes were governed by vestries and were subject to the Middlesex Quarter Sessions. In 1855, the area became part of the district of the Metropolitan Board of Works and the parish vestries were incorporated as local authorities. In 1889, the parishes were transferred from the County of Middlesex to the County of London. Clerkenwell became part of the Metropolitan Borough of Finsbury and Islington became the Metropolitan Borough of Islington in 1900. The two boroughs were combined in 1965 as the London Borough of Islington in Greater London.

== Governance ==
Angel is part of the United Kingdom Parliament constituency of Islington South and Finsbury.

== Geography ==
Angel is located 2 miles (3.2 km) north-northeast of Charing Cross on the Inner Ring Road at the northern edge of Central London. The area defined by Islington London Borough Council as the Angel town centre stretches from Islington Green in the north and includes the southern parts of Liverpool Road and Upper Street. In the west it extends to include Chapel Market. South of the Angel intersection it includes the northern part of St John Street. Chapel Market creates a conservation area and the lower portion of Upper Street forms the Angel conservation area. North of Angel is Islington, west is Pentonville, south is Clerkenwell and east is St Luke's.

== Economy ==
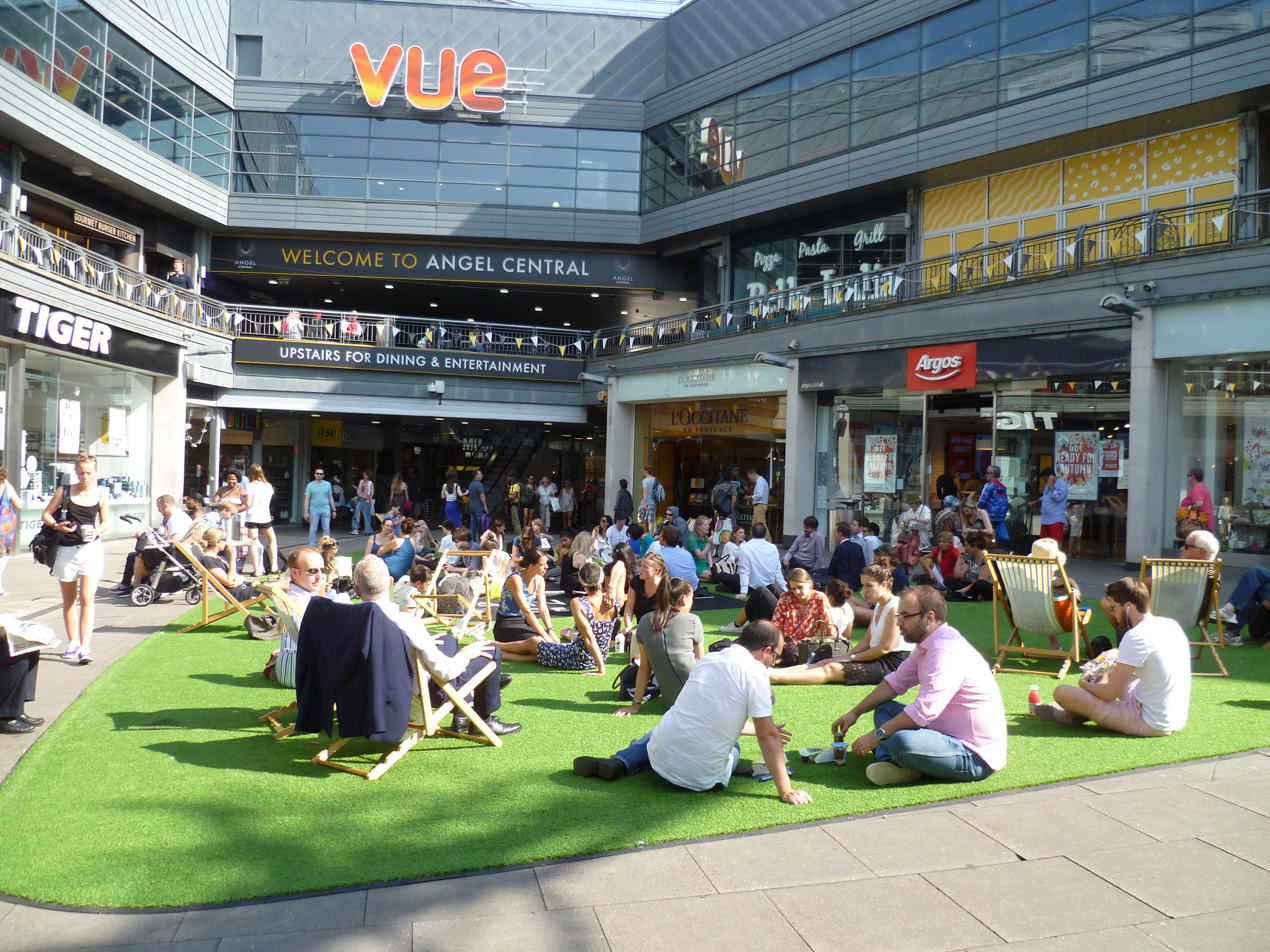
Angel Central shopping centre

Angel is identified in the London Plan as one of 35 major centres in Greater London. It is a business improvement district, categorised as 'high street and town centre', known as angel.london. The main economic activity of the area is retail. Secondary to this are the evening economy, leisure and education - Angel Central is a shopping centre with a mixture of shops, leisure and entertainment facilities including a Vue cinema and the O2 Academy Islington nightclub. It was opened in 2002 as the N1 Centre, and renamed Angel Central in March 2015. The City and Islington College is another large example of these categories.

== Transport ==
=== Rail ===
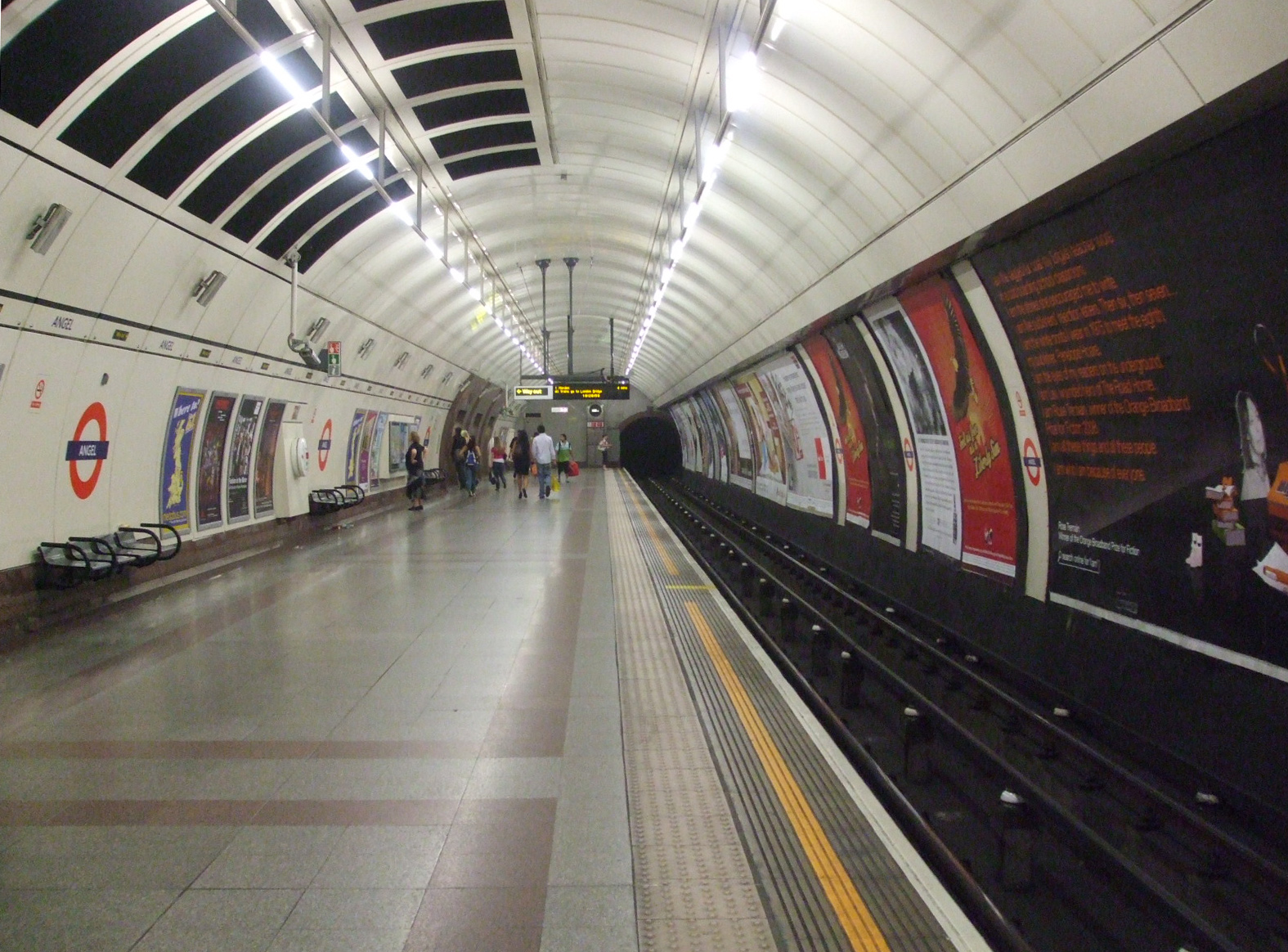
Angel tube station is on the Northern line, Bank Branch, between King's Cross St Pancras and Old Street stations.

Angel is the name of a London Underground station on the Northern line. The station is part of an office block constructed in the early 1990s known as Angel Square, which incorporated new escalator shafts down to the station platforms (to replace the former lifts), and in the process moved the station entrance to its current location on Islington High St. The original station building on nearby Torrens Street still exists, although it is now used solely for housing the station's mechanical systems.

Angel tube station gives the locality a direct link northbound to Euston and Camden Town towards Edgware and High Barnet. Southbound trains pass through Old Street, the City of London, London Bridge and Elephant & Castle towards Morden.

The station is in London fare zone 1, and Oyster Cards can be used for travel to and from the station. Angel saw 19.2 million passenger entries and exits in 2017.

Other nearby stations include:

- Essex Road
- Farringdon
- King's Cross St Pancras (including King's Cross and St Pancras International)
- Old Street

=== Bus ===
Several London Bus routes serve Angel, including buses 4, 10, 19, 30, 38, 43, 56, 73, 153, 205, 214, 274, 341, 394, 476 and night buses N19, N38, N41, N73, N205, N277.

=== Road ===
Upper Street carries the A1 from Angel northbound towards Highbury, Archway and the M1. The route's northern terminus is in Edinburgh, whilst to the south, the road passes through Clerkenwell en route to the City of London on Goswell Road.

The London Inner Ring Road passes east–west through Angel on Pentonville Road and City Road. The route is numbered the A501 and links the area directly to King's Cross and Euston eastbound, and Old Street, Shoreditch and Aldgate to the southeast.

Other key routes include St John Street (A401) to Finsbury and Holborn, and Essex Road (A104) towards Canonbury, Dalston and Harringay (via A105). Liverpool Road is also a busy route, running from Angel northbound towards Holloway.

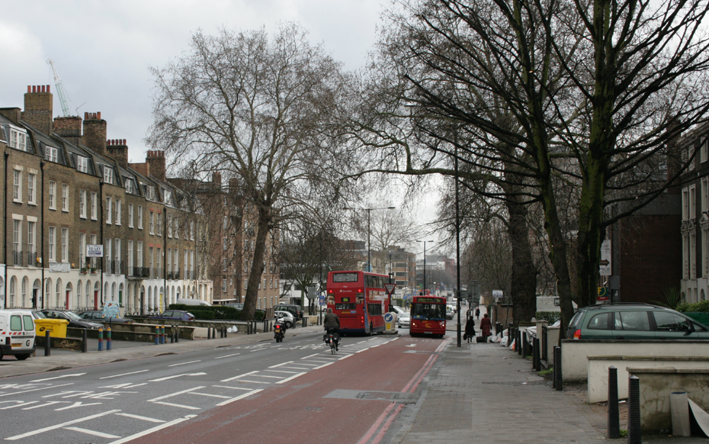
City Road's 2017 annual average Nitrogen Dioxide (NO_{2}) concentration was 48 μg/m-3 (micrograms per cubic metre), which fails to meet the UK national air quality objectives.

The London Borough of Islington monitors roadside pollution levels near Angel. A monitoring station for Nitrogen Dioxide (NO_{2}) on City Road recorded an annual average NO_{2} level of 48 μg/m^{3} (micrograms per cubic metres) in 2017. This fails to meet the UK national clean air quality objective of 40 μg/m^{3}.

=== Cycling ===
Cycling infrastructure is provided in the Angel area by the London Borough of Islington and Transport for London (TfL). This includes bus lanes which may be used by cyclists along Upper Street, Goswell Road, Pentonville Road and City Road.

Other cycling routes include:

- Quietway 2 (Q2) - runs east–west through Angel. To the east, the route is unbroken and signposted along residential streets, connecting the area to Dalston, Hackney and Walthamstow. Westbound, the route runs unbroken to Myddleton Square and Bloomsbury, where the route joins Cycle Superhighway 6 (CS6) to King's Cross or the City of London and Elephant & Castle.
- Q11 - runs southbound from Angel to Southwark Bridge via Old Street and London Wall. This route is signposted and unbroken on local streets. The route connects Angel directly to CS3 (between Hyde Park and Barking via Westminster and Tower Bridge) and CS7 (to Colliers Wood via Elephant & Castle and Kennington).
- Regent's Canal Towpath - runs either side of Angel on a shared-use path, but not through Angel, as the canal passes through the Islington Tunnel. To the east, the route runs unbroken and traffic-free to Old Street, Victoria Park, Mile End and Limehouse. Westbound, the route runs traffic-free through King's Cross, Camden Town and Regent's Park to Maida Vale.

Santander Cycles, a London-wide bike-sharing system operates in Angel.

=== Canal ===
The Regent's Canal and its towpath undershoot Angel through Islington Tunnel, and link eastbound to Mile End, the Hertford Union Canal, and Limehouse Basin's lock with the Thames. West, the canal passes through Camden Town and Maida Vale to the Little Venice junction for either Paddington Basin or the rest of the Grand Union Canal.

City Road Basin stands to the east of Angel, near City Road Lock. Battlebridge Basin is in King's Cross, to Angel's west.

The Canal is maintained by the Canal & River Trust.
