= Penton Street =

Street in London, England

Coordinates: 51.532433°N 0.111331°W

Penton Street

Penton Street is a street in the Pentonville area of London. It runs as a continuation of Amwell Street across Pentonville Road in the south and continues north as Barnsbury Road. The adjoining Chapel Market runs perpendicular to its east.

== History ==
The land of the street, as well as much of surrounding Pentonville, was owned by Henry Penton, after which both are named. Plans to turn what was a path across his land into a formal street were first devised in 1767, and was the first part of the Pentonville development. The street was laid out and houses were erected beginning 1770.

The street became a sort of hub for the area, described as the Regent's Park of the City Road. With the northward continuation of the street into Islington in Barnsbury Road only constructed by the 1820s, the northern, as well as southern ends, were semi-rural in character. White Conduit House, which had existed before the street, was on the northern end with bowling greens on the south. By 1828 it was described as the high street of Pentonville, and the street continued to become more commercial, and then industrial, in character through the Victorian era. In the 20th century, social housing and modern buildings replaced much of what historic housing was left.

Notable residents of the street have included Joseph Grimaldi, the clown, John Hodgkin the grammarian and calligrapher and his sons Thomas Hodgkin who discovered Hodkin's disease and barrister John Hodgkin. Also on the street lived Stanley Lees Giffard and his son Hardinge Stanley Giffard lived, and Lemuel Francis Abbott.

== Notable buildings ==
At the northern end of the street is the Grade II listed Church of St Silas with All Saints, alongside its war memorial which is also listed. Nos. 50–56 are also Grade II listed. Nos. 7 and 9 are the best preserved original houses of the street.

No. 28 was previously the headquarters of the African National Congress, in exile during the apartheid regime. In 2024, work began on refurbishing the building to open as a "Centre of Memory and Learning" on the history of apartheid, and the role of the UK in ending it.

== See also ==
- Amwell Street
- Pentonville Road
