= The Angel, Islington =

Historic landmark in Islington, London, England

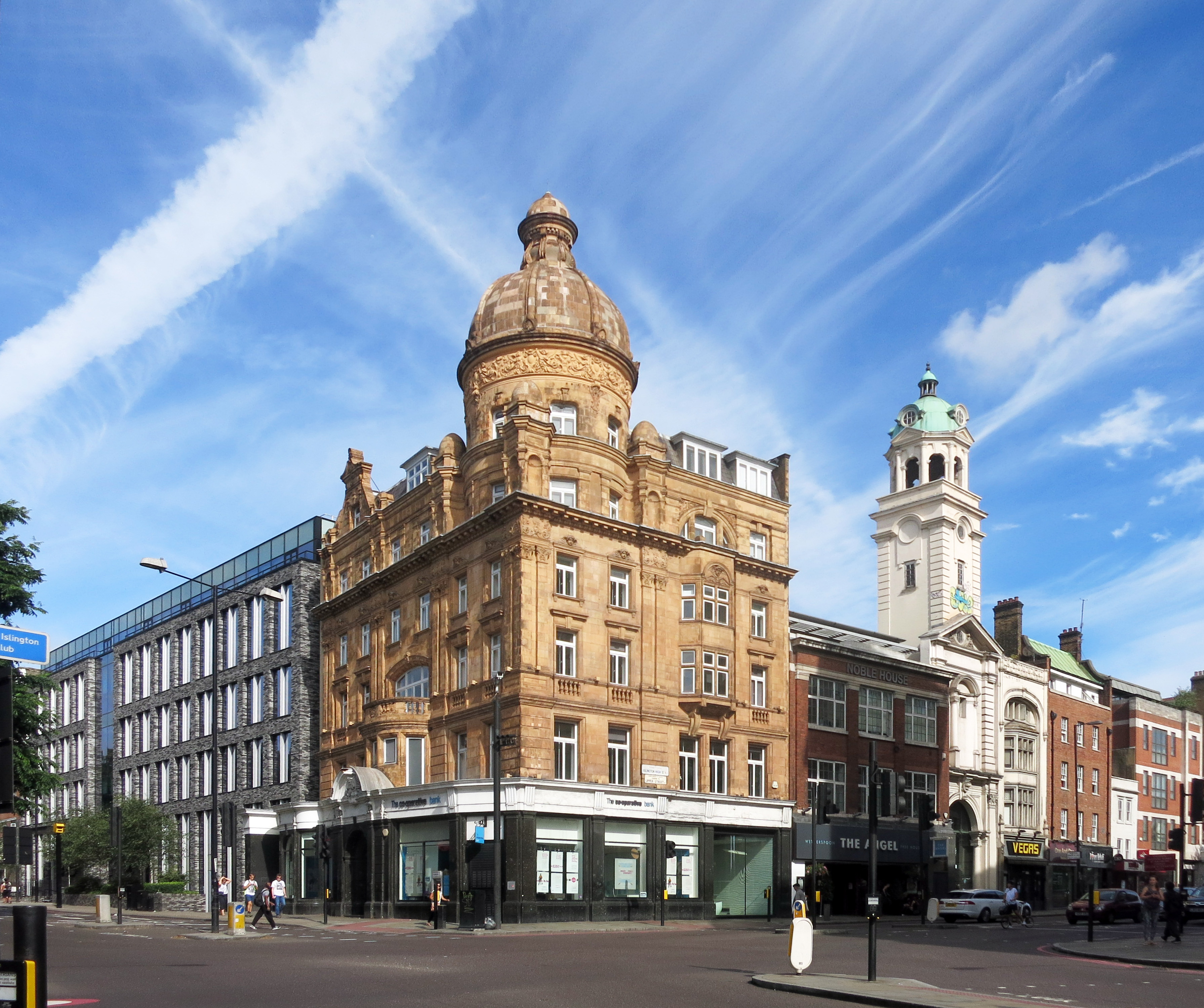
- Angel Corner House (1903, now offices) on the original corner site

- Location within London Borough of Islington
- Former names: Angel Inn; Angel Hotel

General information
- Location: Angel, London Borough of Islington, Greater London, 1 Islington High Street, England
- Coordinates: 51.532°N 0.106°W
- Current tenants: ORC International
- Completed: 1903 (current premises)
- Renovated: 1979–1982
- Owner: Hamilton Investment Properties

Technical details
- Floor count: 6
- Floor area: 1,083 square metres (11,660 sq ft)

Design and construction
- Architect: Eedle and Meyers

Renovating team
- Architect: Elsom Pack & Roberts
- Renovating firm: McLaughlin & Harvey Ltd

Listed Building – Grade II
- Official name: The Angel
- Designated: 31 January 1991
- Reference no.: 1207594

The Angel, Islington, is a historic landmark and a series of buildings that have stood on the corner of Islington High Street and Pentonville Road in Islington, London, England. The land originally belonged to the Clerkenwell Priory and has had various properties built on it since the 16th century. An inn on the site was called the Angel Inn by 1614, and the crossing became generally known as the Angel. The site was bisected by the New Road, which opened in 1756, and properties on the site were rebuilt several times up to the 20th century. The corner site gave its name to Angel tube station, opened in 1901, and the surrounding Angel area of London.

The current structure was completed in 1903 and was known as the Angel Hotel. The building was acquired by J. Lyons and Co. in 1921 and was used as a restaurant. In 1935 it was chosen as a property for the British version of Monopoly. The building was sold to London County Council in 1959 to be demolished as part of plans for road improvement works that did not take place. It was returned to private ownership, renovated from 1979 and reopened in 1982 as the Angel Corner House. It contained a branch of the Co-operative Bank until 2024. It is currently used as offices, and is a grade II listed building.

== History ==
=== Early history ===
In the early 16th century a building in this area of London on the Great North Road was known as the Sheepcote. It was named after lands belonging to St John's Priory. The building was being used as an inn by the end of the 16th century and was known as the Angel by 1614. The inn took its name from the Angel of the Annunciation which appeared on the sign.

The Angel Inn became a useful stop when travelling from the City of London, as the rural area outside it was considered dangerous, with travellers having armed escorts from Wood's Close to Islington. Despite its name, and common association with Islington, the grounds of the inn and all of the western edge of Islington High Street were in neighbouring Clerkenwell.

=== 17th–18th century ===
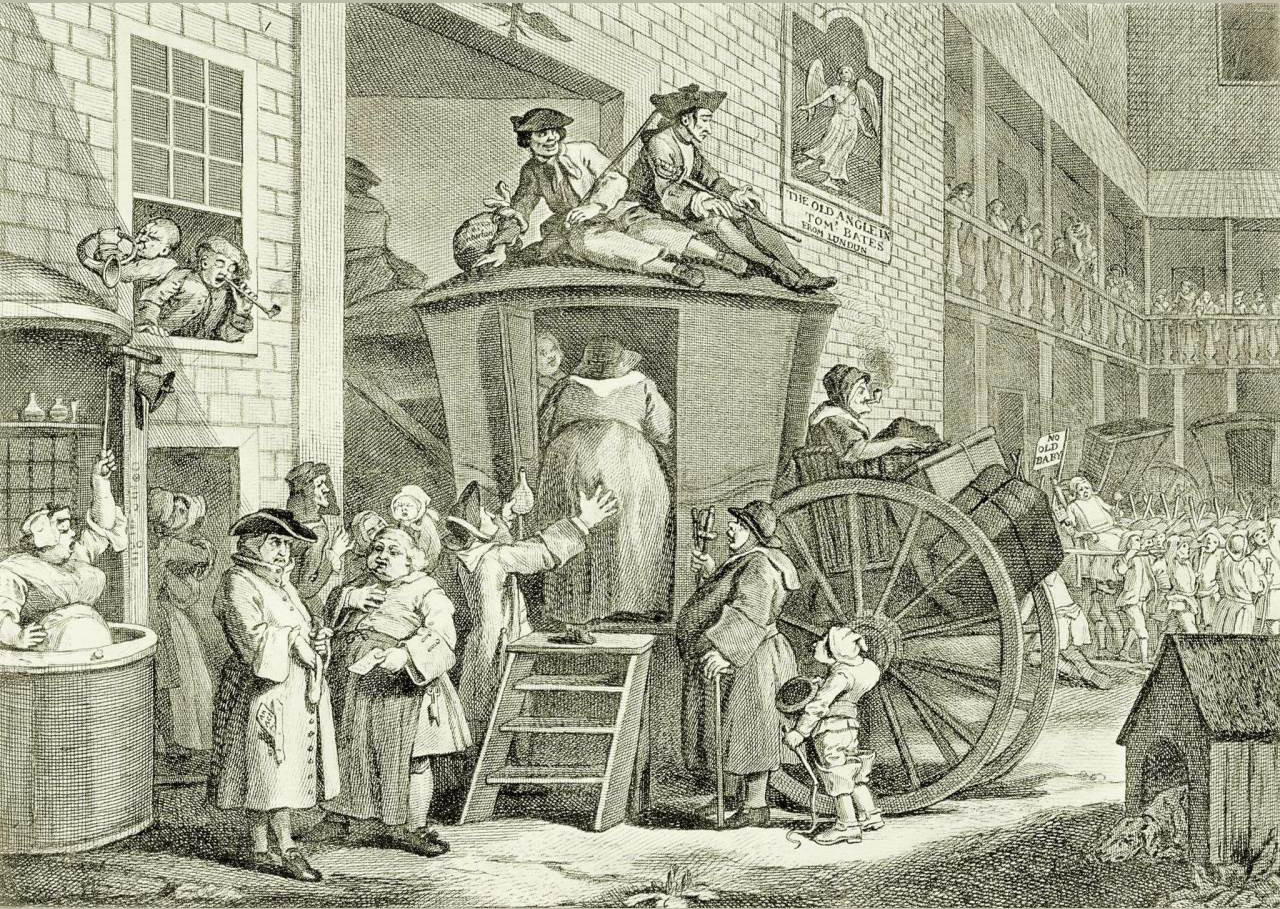
William Hogarth's portrait The Stage Coach is believed to be based in the grounds of the Angel, Islington.

By 1630, the inn was owned by William Riplingham, officer of the Great Wardrobe. Riplingham built an extension of the courtyard ranges on the site of the Angel Inn around 1638, for which he was fined due to breaking building regulations. These ranges survived up to the early 19th century. By 1677, the Angel was owned by James Compton, 3rd Earl of Northampton, and occupied by Edward Fawcett, who ran the inn until his death in 1696. The premises accommodated livestock traders (drovers) destined for Smithfield Market, as well as long-distance travellers.

In the early 18th century, the Angel was the largest coaching house in a row of several along Islington High Street. Robert Bartholomew took over ownership of the inn in 1744 and was succeeded by his son, Christopher, around 1766, who continued to run it until the end of the century. The inn was the subject of William Hogarth's 1747 drawing, The Stage-Coach, Or The Country Inn Yard, which depicted busy coaching inn trade and traffic. In his book The Inns and Taverns of Old London published in 1909, Henry C. Shelley said "The Angel dates back to before 1665 ... In the seventeenth century and later, as old pictures testify, the inn presented the usual features of a large old country hostelry."

The building of the New Road in 1756 bisected the Angel Inn site and the stable buildings were cut off on the southern side. The inn was on the northern side, on the corner of what is now the junction of Islington High Street and Pentonville Road, while the stables were now on what is St John Street, adjacent to the New Inn, which had been established in 1744. The Angel benefited from the extra traffic brought by the New Road, and in addition to accommodation provided a number of assembly rooms for public meetings. The author and political activist Thomas Paine is believed to have begun writing Rights of Man at the Angel in 1790, and there is a monument on Islington High Street commemorating this.

=== 19th century ===
By the start of the 19th century, fields south of the Angel were being built on, resulting in all land towards the City of London becoming urban. The Angel was rebuilt during 1819 and 1820 to become a post house and meeting place for various London businesses. The redevelopment was directed by Charles Smith, and subsequently let to James Smith. The size of the inn was reduced and adjacent plots were sold off, allowing development of houses and shops, though the inn's grounds remained substantial. It was now advertised as the "Angel Inn Tavern and Hotel for Gentlemen and Families", and the front of the tavern faced the New Road.

View of the Angel, Islington from the southeast, in the late 1890s

By the 1850s, the Angel was reported to be in decline. The New Road was renamed Pentonville Road in 1857, and the inn's management successfully put shop fronts on the road around 1870, along with extensive refurbishments. In 1880, the Angel was refurbished internally for William Henry and Richard Baker, later to become large-scale pub owners. In 1883 the stables were sold to the London Street Tramways and the main building was sold to the brewers Truman, Hanbury, Buxton & Co. in 1896.

Construction of a new building in pale terracotta stone with a corner cupola was started in 1899 by the architects Frederick James Eedle and Sydney Herbert Meyers. The brewers proclaimed the new building to be "the widest-known hostelry in the world", and work was completed in 1903. A panel on a second floor balcony still bears this opening date. The parish of Clerkenwell became the Metropolitan Borough of Finsbury in 1900 and when the City and South London Railway opened a new tube station in the area in 1901 it was named Angel.

=== 20th–21st century ===
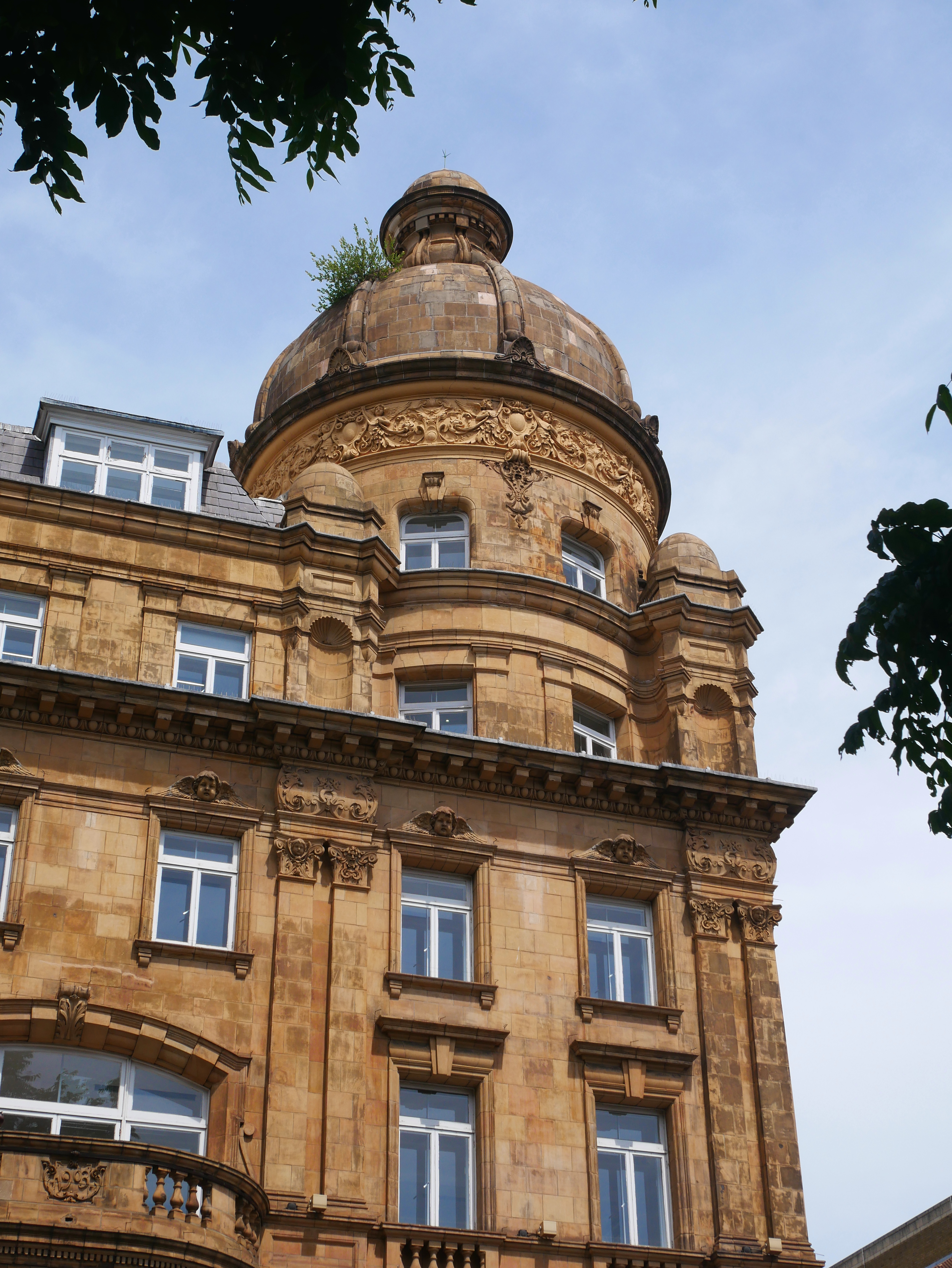
Detail on the south face of Angel Corner House

The pub ceased trading in 1921 and the building was sold to restaurateurs J. Lyons and Co. It was adapted as the flagship site of the business, though it was not technically a standard Lyons Corner House. The restaurant remained popular, and could accommodate up to 300 people, as did Lyons Corner Houses across London throughout the 1920s and 30s, but fell out of favour as fast food began to become popular in the 1950s.

In 1959 The Angel was closed and sold to the London County Council as part of a plan to demolish it to make way for a new road scheme at the Angel intersection. It was used temporarily by the City University. Finsbury merged with the Metropolitan Borough of Islington to form the London Borough of Islington in 1965 and ownership of the site passed to the Greater London Council. The proposals for demolition of the site along with road changes were opposed by Homes before Roads and the Islington Society. Plans to alter the intersection and create a layout similar to that at Old Street roundabout were abandoned and the building was saved from demolition.

The Greater London Council sold the building to the New River Company, with the property becoming part of the London Merchant Securities portfolio. The building was renovated between 1979 and 1982 by McLaughlin & Harvey Ltd with architects Elsom Pack & Roberts converting the building for office use and renaming it Angel Corner House. The ground floor was used as a branch of The Co-operative Bank until 2024, and the ORC International market research agency occupies the upper floors. The building is now privately owned by Hamilton Investment Properties.

Angel Corner House, along with this section of Islington High Street, has been part of the Angel conservation area since 1981 and Angel Corner House has been a listed building since 1991 and is Grade II on the National Heritage List for England. The council describe this as "the character or appearance of which it is desirable to preserve or enhance". Local planning regulations stipulate that new development in the area must not be taller than the dome on Angel Corner House.

== Related developments ==
On 27 October 1998, a J D Wetherspoon pub named The Angel opened at 3 Islington High Street, adjacent to Angel Corner House. The site is part of the original Angel Inn site that was redeveloped as shops in the 1820. The pub was later sold and renamed The Junction, to be run independently. In 2024 that pub was sold again and renamed The Peacock, reviving the name of a coaching inn which stood nearby from 1564 to 1962.

Ten Four Pentonville Road is a redevelopment of Angel Mews. It is located at the site of the original Angel Inn's stables. The Hilton London Angel Islington Hotel is named after the pub. It is located on Upper Street to the north of the original Angel.

== Cultural references ==
"The Angel Islington" is a property in the British version of Monopoly. In the game it is the third-cheapest property on the board, reflecting the downmarket state of Islington through most of the 20th century until its gentrification in the 1980s. Victor Watson, of British manufacturers John Waddington Ltd, and his secretary, Marjory Philips, decided to include the property on the board whilst taking tea at the cafe. This account of events appears on a plaque displayed in the bank within the building; the inscription says it is the "only site on the board named after a building" that was not a railway station. It is part of the light blue group with Pentonville Road and Euston Road. In the game, a house at the Angel costs £50; by the turn of the 21st century a house on Islington High Street fetched around £600,000.

In 1827, James Pollard painted The Royal Mail Coaches for the North Leaving the Angel, Islington, currently on display in the Tate Gallery. The Charles Dickens novel Oliver Twist contains a reference to the Angel, where "London began in earnest". Neil Gaiman's fantasy television series Neverwhere has a character named Angel Islington, after the inn. "The Angel, Islington" is the opening track on singer/songwriter Frank Turner's album Positive Songs for Negative People.
