= Christopher Theakstone =

English cricketer and embezzler

Personal information
- Full name: Christopher Edwin Theakstone
- Born: 10 March 1812; Pentonville, London, England
- Died: Unknown

Domestic team information
- Years: Team
- 1848–1849: Hampshire

Career statistics
Competition	First-class
Matches	2
Runs scored	26
Batting average	6.50
100s/50s	–/–
Top score	15
Catches/stumpings	–/–
- Source: Cricinfo, 26 April 2010

Christopher Edwin Theakstone (born 10 March 1812; date of death unknown) was an English first-class cricketer. While chief cashier of the Portsmouth branch of the Bank of England in March 1861 he absconded with over £1000. During his arrest the following month in Lambeth he cut his throat with a razor but survived. He was charged with embezzlement, pleaded guilty, and was sentenced to four years imprisonment. He was born in Pentonville, London.

Theakstone represented Hampshire, making his first-class debut in 1848 against an All England Eleven. Theakstone played one further match for the county against the same opposition in 1849.
