= From Pentonville Road Looking West: Evening =

Painting by George John O'Connor

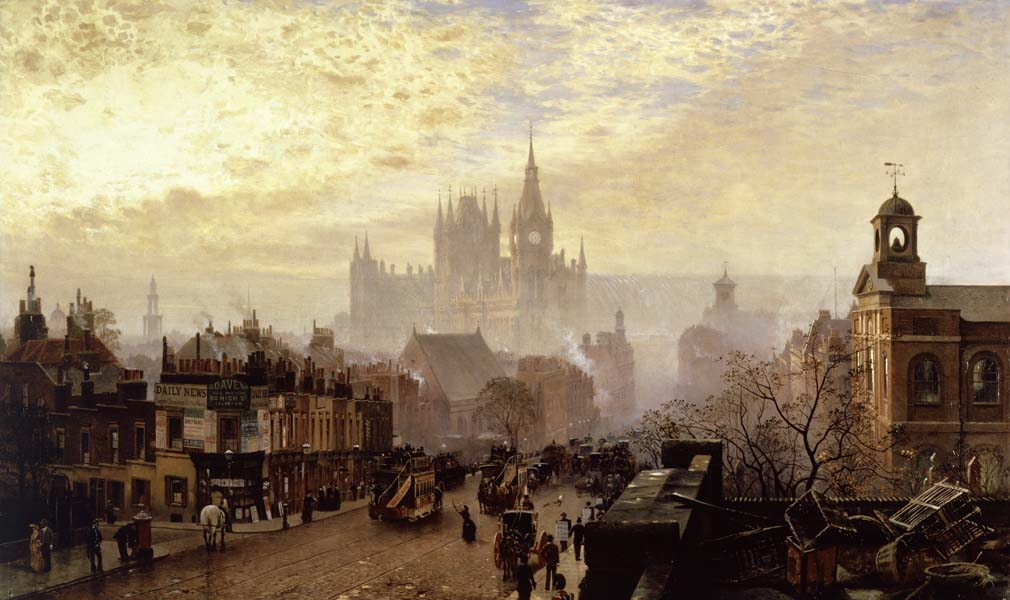
- Artist: John O'Connor
- Year: 1884
- Medium: Oil on canvas
- Dimensions: 90.3 cm × 150.3 cm (35.6 in × 59.2 in)
- Location: London Museum, London

From Pentonville Road Looking West: Evening is an 1884 oil painting by Irish painter John O'Connor.

== History and description ==
The painting depicts a view of the Midland Grand Hotel of St Pancras Station in London as seen from a rooftop on Pentonville Road. Most of the buildings in the foreground no longer exist, including St James's Church on the right, although this was rebuilt in a broadly similar design and now houses the Royal National Institute of Blind People. Seen along Pentonville Road are horse-drawn trams, a relative newcomer to the streets of London, with those along Pentonville Road opened only a year earlier. The painting was acquired by the London Museum in 1952, and remains in their collection.
