= Pentonville Road =

Road in central London

Coordinates: 51°31′52″N 0°7′2″W

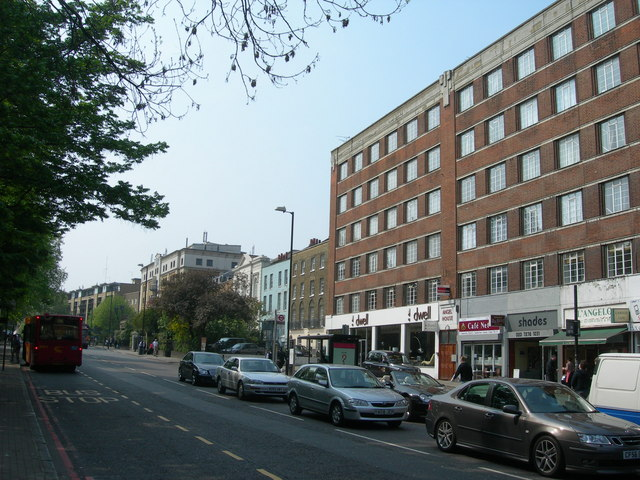
Pentonville Road, west of The Angel, Islington, looking towards King's Cross

Pentonville Road is a road in Central London that runs west to east from Kings Cross to City Road at The Angel, Islington. The road is part of the London Inner Ring Road and part of the boundary of the London congestion charge zone.

The road was originally built in the mid-18th century as part of the New Road, a bypass of Central London for coach traffic. It was named Pentonville Road after the new town of Pentonville, that encouraged manufacturing to move out of the city and into suburbia. Numerous factories and commercial premises became established on the road in the 19th and 20th centuries, particularly after the arrival of London railways in the 1840s.

As industrial manufacturing fell out of favour in London in the late 20th century, many properties are now residential or student accommodation. Current premises include the Crafts Council Gallery on the site of a former chapel, the Scala nightclub in a former cinema, and The Castle, a public house.

== Geography ==
The road is 0.7 miles (1.1 km) long and runs east from King's Cross station as a continuation of Euston Road. It ends at the Angel, Islington, at a junction with Islington High Street and Goswell Road; the road ahead becoming City Road. Only eastbound traffic can travel on the full extent of the road; westbound traffic is diverted south via Swinton Street. The road is on the London Inner Ring Road (A501) and as such forms part of the boundary of the London congestion charge zone. Since 1995, it has been a red route, prohibiting stopping of any kind, including loading and unloading.

Most of the road is in the London Borough of Islington but a small part near Kings Cross is in the London Borough of Camden, including the King's Cross Thameslink railway station and the "Lighthouse" Block. London Underground and National Rail stations in the vicinity include Kings Cross and Angel Underground station.

There has been a bus service on Pentonville Road since 1829. Regular bus routes running along the road are 30, 73, 205 and 214.

== History ==
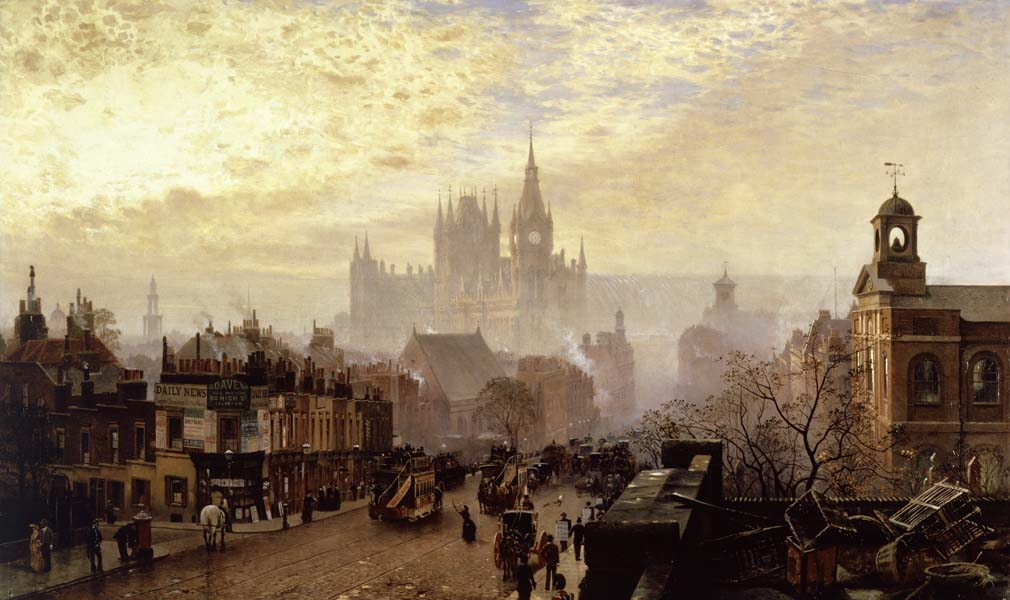
From Pentonville Road Looking West: Evening, drawn in 1884 by John O'Connor

What is now Pentonville Road was built as the final section of the New Road in 1756, connecting the City of London to the western suburbs, so that coach traffic could avoid Central London. At the time, the route now covered by Pentonville Road was mostly fields, with Battle Bridge occupying the space where King's Cross now is. It included a tavern known as Busby's Folly, a meeting place of a drinking group known as the Society of Bull Feathers. It is marked on John Ogilby's map of London in 1675. It was moved around 1780 to Penton Street and renamed the Belvedere Tavern. The current building dates from 1876.

The road was designed as part of Pentonville, a new suburb away from the city and became a local hub for manufacturing in the area. There was some debate over the final route of the road; the original plan to run straight through fields owned by the Skinners Company and the New River Company was rejected in favour of the route further north via Battle Bridge. As it was always intended to be a main road, a coach service began in 1798 between Paddington and Bank but was quickly withdrawn. The road was turnpiked in 1830 and renamed Pentonville Road after landowner Henry Penton in 1857. Until 1882, the upkeep of the road was paid by the local parish, paying a ground rent to Penton's estate for the disused toll house at No. 274.

The street is distinguished by the "set back" housing lines originally intended to provide an atmosphere of spaciousness along the thoroughfare. The original 1756 act to create the New Road prohibited the construction of any building within 50 feet (15 m) of its side. Though the area had been designed to be a pleasant suburb, the arrival of railways in the 1840s turned the road into an industrial urban street, with factories and workshops aligning the road. The original bylaw restricting property on the front of the road was ignored and shops were built on top of gardens.

By the 21st century, most of the manufacturing base along Pentonville Road had disappeared. The original townhouses are now apartments.

== Properties ==
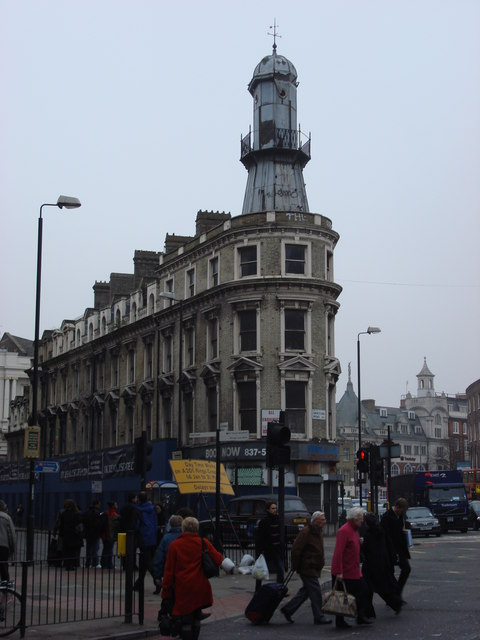
The Lighthouse Block, at Nos. 295–297 Pentonville Road, is named after the distinctive structure at the top of the building.

Alexander Cumming, former clockmaker and organ builder to Archibald Campbell, 3rd Duke of Argyll, built a house at No. 166 Pentonville Road. In 1807, the year after his death, the house became the London Female Penitentiary, housing "fallen women" and rehabilitating them into society. It was extended between 1811 and 1812, roughly tripling its capacity, and moved to Stoke Newington in 1884.

The Thomas S. Jones organ builders were based at No. 25 Pentonville Road between 1860 and 1935. The Dunn & Hewett cocoa factory was established at No. 9 Pentonville Road in 1833 by Daniel Dunn, who went into partnership with Charles Hewett in the 1850s. The business claimed to have invented soluble chocolate and cocoa, and moved to No. 136, expanding to No. 138 in the 1870s. The building was enlarged and partially rebuilt over the 1880s and 90s, and included a staff tea-room at No. 140 by 1907. The factory closed around 1930 and was subsequently sub-let to various businesses. The Ealing Radiator Company was established at Nos. 152–154 Pentonville Road in 1936, manufacturing car radiators. A first floor extension was added in 1952, while Nos. 136–150 were cleared to accommodate a low metal-framed building. These premises have now been sub-let to various businesses.

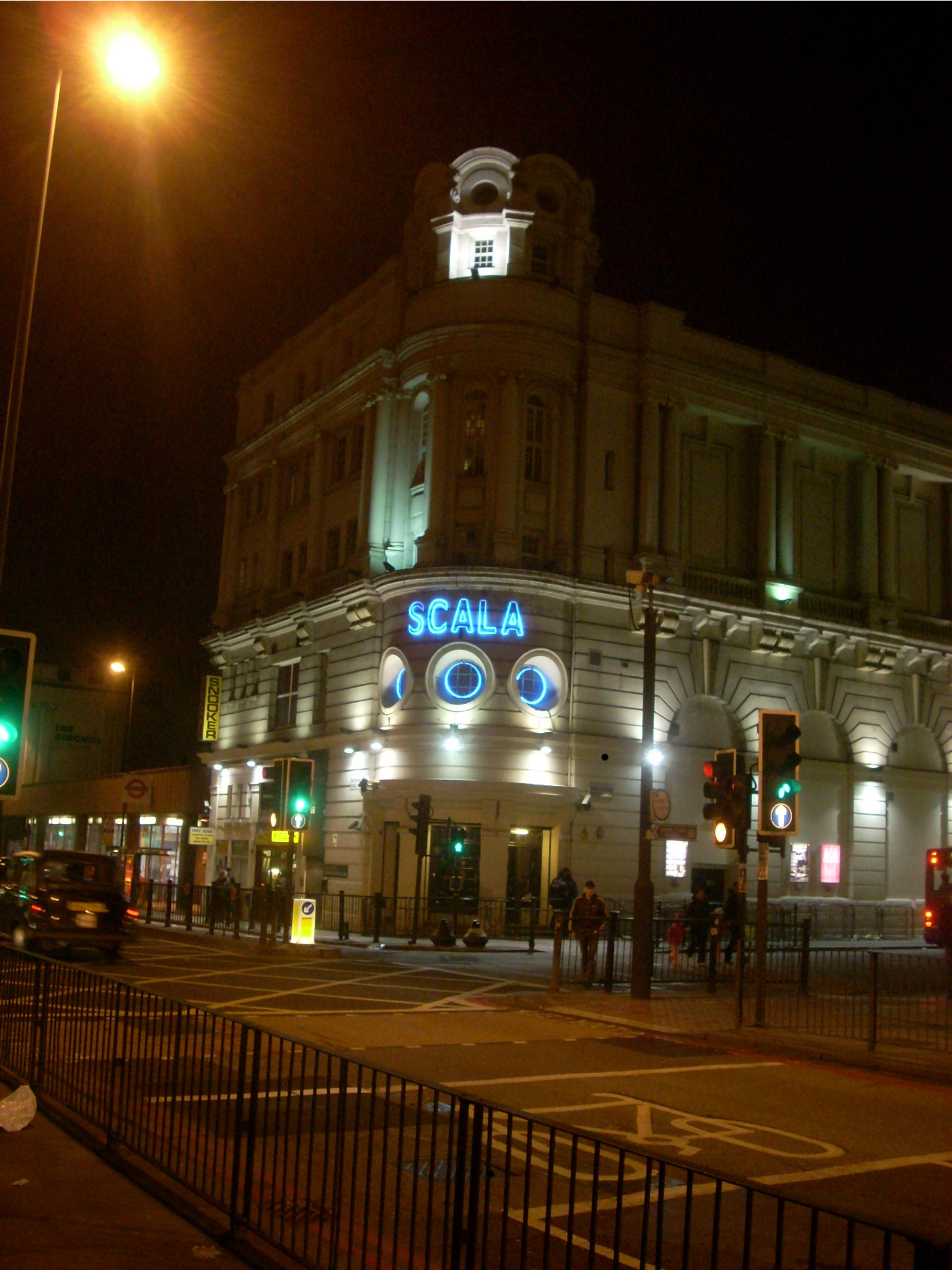
The Scala was previously the King's Cross Cinema, established on Pentonville Road in 1920.

The Claremont Chapel was at No. 44a Pentonville Road. It was named after Claremont House, home of the then-recently deceased Princess Charlotte Augusta of Wales. The chapel was built by Thomas Wilson, who acquired the 2-acre site in 1818 for £700, spending an additional £6,000 on building works. It opened in October 1819, though a regular pastor was not appointed until 1822. The building was extended in 1847 to accommodate a Sunday school, while sash windows were installed in 1853. In 1860, the building was refurbished and given a Classical facade, but reducing the capacity of the inside gallery. Attendance declined and the chapel was sold to the London Congregational Union, before closing in 1899. It re-opened in 1902 as Claremont Hall, a mission institute. It was let for commercial purposes in the 1960s, and sub-let to the Crafts Council in 1991. The building is now the Crafts Council Gallery, a public gallery funded by the Arts Council England. It contains a number of exhibition rooms that are available for use.

The block of properties at No. 295–297 Pentonville Road, at its junction with Gray's Inn Road, is known as the "Lighthouse Block" owing to the lead clad tower at the top of the building. The site avoided being compulsorily purchased and demolished (in order to provide improvements to King's Cross station's eastern entrance) and is now Grade II listed.

The Vernon Square school opened on Pentonville Road in 1913, expanding to cover secondary school students in 1949. It was renamed the Sir Philip Magnus School in 1952 and closed in the 1970s. It became part of Kingsway College before being purchased by the School of Oriental and African Studies in 2001. The SOAS has several other halls of residence along Pentonville Road, including Dinwiddy House.

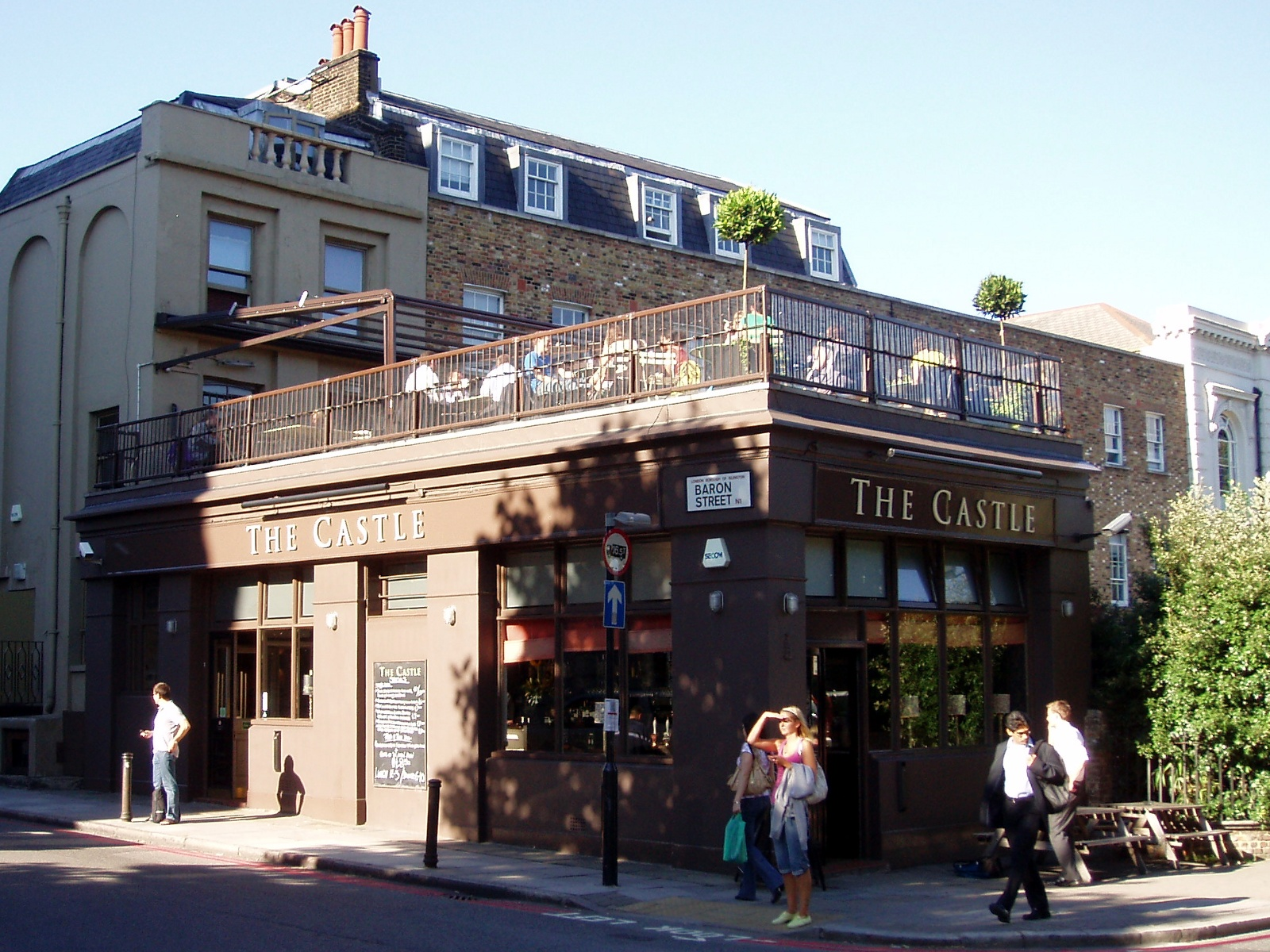
The Castle, a pub on Pentonville Road, achieved notoriety in 2015 when it was discovered the Hatton Garden safe deposit burglary was discussed there by the perpetrators.

The Lexington is a music venue at Nos. 96-98. It has played host to local bands, and as a warm-up venue for more established acts. The Scala at No. 275–277 Pentonville Road opened as the King's Cross Cinema in 1920 with a capacity of 1,300. Construction had begun just before World War I and was halted because of it. It was damaged by bombs during World War II, and while it remained open during wartime, it eventually had to be shut between 1949 and 1952 for renovations and repair. It closed in 1970, and re-opened as an independent cinema, which showed old 16mm films including King Kong. The Stooges played their only gig in London at the venue in June 1972, shortly before recording the album Raw Power with David Bowie; a shot of Iggy Pop onstage here became the album's front cover. The venue closed in 1992, and is now a nightclub.

The Castle is a pub at No. 54 Pentonville Road, at the junction with Baron Street. In 2015, the perpetrators of the Hatton Garden safe deposit burglary met at the pub to discuss the crime shortly after it occurred, but were secretly filmed there by the Flying Squad. All were subsequently arrested and sent to prison. The current owners, Geronimo Inns, wish to distance themselves from the burglary and forbid staff to discuss it with customers.

The original Angel, Islington, sits at the far east end of Pentonville Road, at its junction with Islington High Street. It was named after the Angel of the Annunciation that appeared on its sign. The inn pre-dated the construction of Pentonville Road, and had become one of the largest coaching inns in the local area by the 18th century. The site was cut in two by the construction of the road, with the inn remaining on the north side. A new building was constructed in 1899, later becoming a Lyons Corner House. It closed in 1959, and was threatened with demolition as a plan to improve junction improvements around Pentonville Road, but survived and is now partly occupied by a branch of The Co-operative Bank.

== Cultural references ==
The poet John Betjeman's parents ran a cabinet makers at No. 34–42 Pentonville Road. It was established since 1859 and produced the Tantalus drinks cabinet in 1881.

Pentonville Road is one of the locations on the London version of the Monopoly board game. It is one of the light blue squares alongside The Angel, Islington and Euston Road, both of which it connects to.

The magazine Mixmag's main offices are at Nos. 90–92 Pentonville Road.

The Pogues' name this street in their song "Transmetropolitan"

== See also ==
- Joseph Grimaldi Park
