= Tantalize =

Tantalize, Tantalised, Tantalizing, Tantalisingly, Tantalizer, Tantalisation, may refer to:

- "tantalize"/"tantalise", a word originating with the Greek mythological character Tantalus (Ancient Greek: Τάνταλος)
- Tantalize (novel), a 2007 young adult novel by Cynthia Leitich Smith
- "Tantalize" (song), a 1977 song by Nick Gilder off the album You Know Who You Are (Nick Gilder album)
- "Tantalize" (song), a 1977 song by Sweeney Todd off the album If Wishes Were Horses featuring Bryan Adams
- "Tantalise (Wo Wo Ee Yeh Yeh)", a 1983 single by Jimmy the Hoover
- "Tantalise" (song), a 1999 song by Still the Finger off the album Hope Street (album)
- "Tantalized" (song), a 1985 song by The Church off the album Heyday (The Church album)
- "Tantalized" (single), a 2015 song and debut single of Fever High written by Adam Schlesinger
- Tantalizers, a Nigerian fast food chain
- Tantalis, a hypothetical lost city theorized by historian Peter James

== See also ==
- Tantalizing Stories, a 1990s comic book series published by Tundra Comics
- Tantalum (element "Ta"), a metallic element
- Tantalus (disambiguation)
