= Euston Tower =

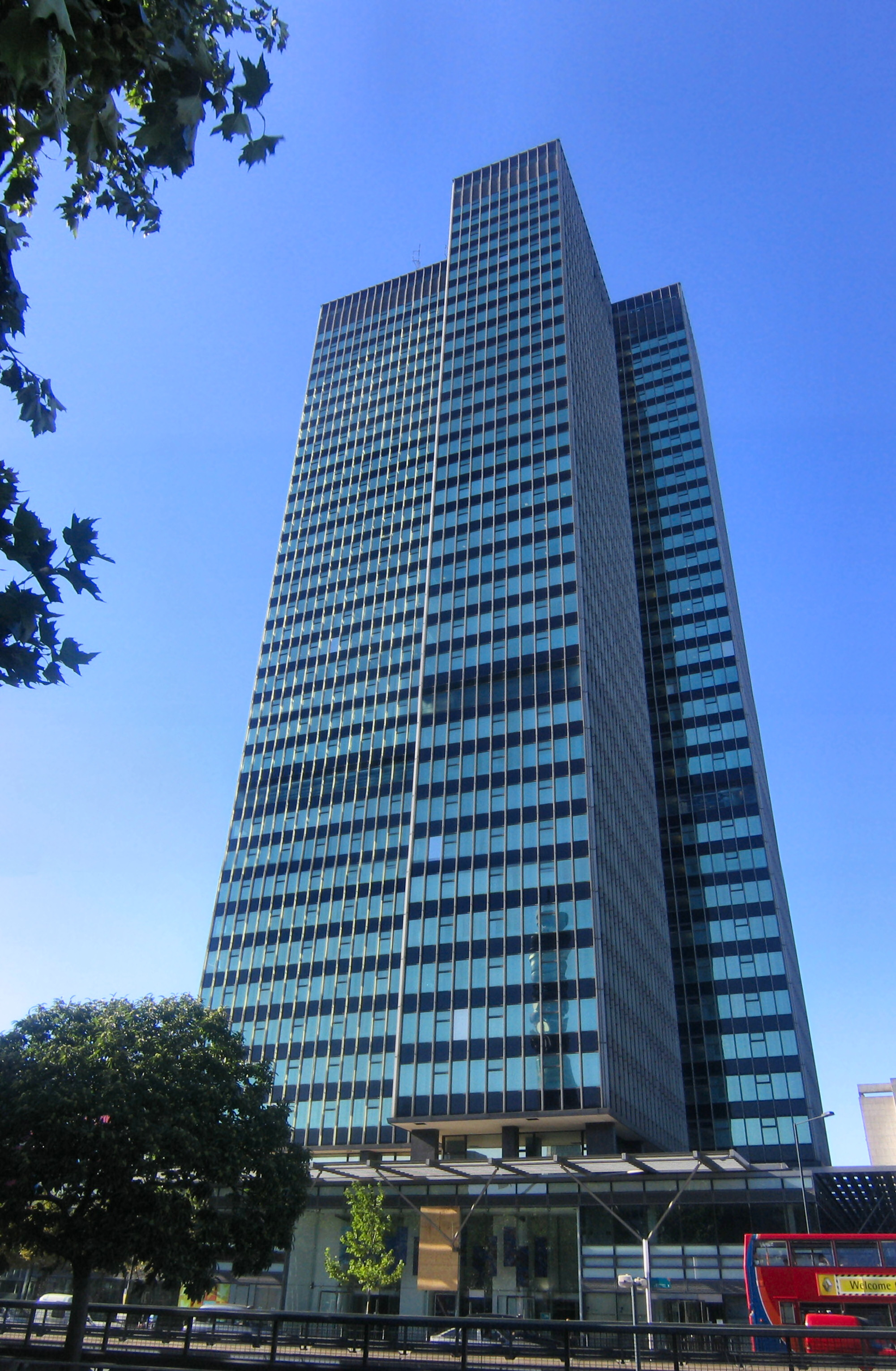
- Euston Tower
- Interactive map of the Euston Tower area

General information
- Status: Completed
- Architectural style: International style
- Location: Euston Road, London Borough of Camden
- Coordinates: 51°31′32.1″N 00°08′21.4″W
- Construction started: 1969
- Construction stopped: 1970

Height
- Height: 124 metres (407 ft)

Technical details
- Floor count: 36

Design and construction
- Architects: Sidney Kaye Eric Firmin & Partners
- Developer: Joe Levy
- Main contractor: George Wimpey

Euston Tower is a skyscraper located on Euston Road in the London Borough of Camden. To its east is Hampstead Road.

== History ==
The site was developed by Joe Levy who bought properties along the north side of Euston Road to enable him to build a complex of two tower blocks with office shops and apartments. The building, which was designed by Sidney Kaye Eric Firmin & Partners in the International style and built by George Wimpey, was completed in 1970. It is 36-storeys and 124 metres (407 ft) high. Early tenants included Inmarsat and Capital Radio.
