= New Road, London =

Historic London road

Coordinates: 51.5311°N 0.1175°W

Central London in 1801 showing New Road with its toll gates (area 4; yellow background). City Road was a separate toll.

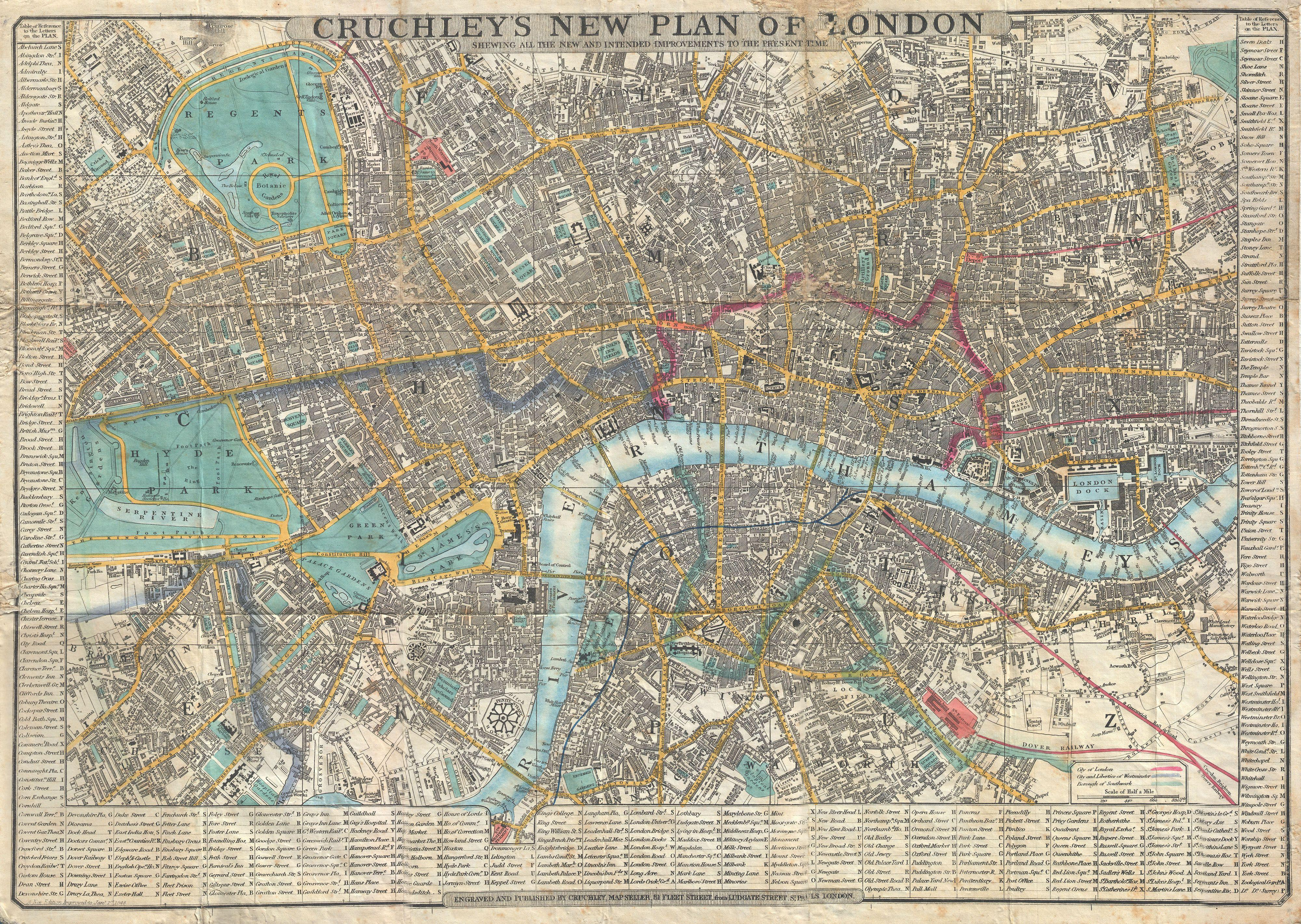
New Road on an 1848 map of London

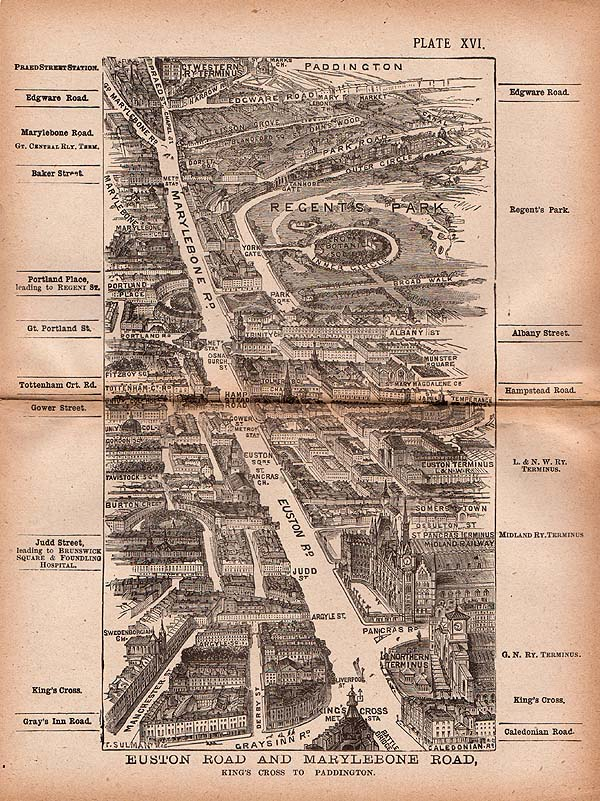
A 1918 street map showing the stretch of the former New Road from Marylebone Road to Euston Road.

The New Road was a toll road built across fields around the northern boundaries of London, the first part of which opened in 1756. The route comprises the modern-day A501 (Old Marylebone Road, Marylebone Road, Euston Road, Pentonville Road, City Road, and Moorgate).

== Background ==
In the 18th century London began to grow rapidly. Until 1750 there was only one road crossing over the River Thames, namely London Bridge. But the capital started to sprawl, first along the river from the City to Westminster, and then north past Soho (in medieval times, the king's hunting grounds) to Oxford Street and beyond.

The Proceedings of the Old Bailey Online Project give a good overview of the demographic growth of the capital. From the early 19th century, London was the largest city in the world.

== Early history ==
Plan of the proposed New Road, 1755

In 1755 influential residents of St Marylebone, Paddington and Islington, all separate villages close to London, petitioned Parliament for the right to provide a turnpike trust road by-passing the northern boundaries of the built up area of London. The road was intended initially as a drovers' road, a route along which cattle and sheep could be driven to (and, for those not slaughtered, from) Smithfield market from roads approaching London from the west and north. This would remove animals on the hoof from the fashionable areas of London and remove a source of congestion on Oxford Street and High Holborn.

The road would begin at a point close to the junction of the Harrow and Edgware Roads and head due east past the northern end of Marylebone Lane to Tottenham Court, and from there to Battle Bridge, St Pancras. Two options were presented for the route to Islington, both connecting to St John's Street, which led to the market (see 1755 plan). The proposal was referred to a parliamentary committee, which, despite opposition from the Duke of Bedford, recommended approval; it suggested that responsibility for the road should be divided between two existing trusts, the St Marylebone (for the section from Edgware Road to Tottenham Court, plus a side street that became Portland Road) and the Islington (for the section from Tottenham Court to the Angel, Islington).

Royal assent for the act, the Highgate and Hampstead Roads Act 1756 (29 Geo. 2. c. 88), was granted on 27 May 1756. The road was to be a minimum of 40 feet (12 m) wide, and no buildings were to be allowed within 50 feet (15 m) of the edge – drovers' roads always had wide margins for grazing. The road was built to a minimum width of 60 feet (18 m), and very rapidly. Construction at first was fairly crude, involving mainly cutting down hedges and filling in ditches, and the route was bounded by fence posts.

Initially, each administering trust retained the tolls exacted as travellers passed its gates, but the tickets were also valid across the section operated by the other trust. As examples of revenue, the St Marylebone trust exacted £400 in 1757, which had risen to £700 in 1764. Five years later the road south-eastwards to Old Street was turnpiked as City Road, terminating near Moorgate.

== Later history ==
The route became an important transport link. In due course it was improved and metalled (but not the way across Lisson Green at the western end, hence the dog-leg of Old Marylebone Road). During the remainder of the 18th century the northern edge of London's built-up area moved towards the road, finally engulfing it, although the 50 feet (15 m) building margin was enforced.

By 1829 much of the road was bordered by fashionable houses, and in that year that the first horse-drawn omnibus service in London was established by George Shillibeer. His example was followed by many others, and the route became the main artery for such traffic for the remainder of the century, linking the sought-after north-western suburbs of 'Tyburnia' with the financial centre (the City of London).

In 1857, New Road was renamed, becoming Marylebone Road, Euston Road and Pentonville Road.

In 1863, the Metropolitan Railway opened the first urban underground railway in the world. Most of the line followed the route of the New Road from Paddington to Kings Cross stations.

In the 20th century, with the advent of motor buses and other motor vehicles, the route became an important orbital road for the northern part of inner London, and part of the inner ring road.

Currently the road as far as the Old Street Roundabout is the northern boundary of the London Congestion Charge area. Traffic can use the route free of charge, but a charge applies when accessing the roads to the south.

== References and sources ==
Sources

- Sheppard, Francis, Local government in St Marylebone 1688-1835 : University of London Athlone Press (1958)
