= John O'Connor (painter) =

Irish artist (1830–1889)

John O'Connor, A.R.H.A.

John O'Connor (12 August 1830 – 23 May 1889) was an Irish painter.

== Personal life ==
Born in 1830 in County Londonderry, the third son of Francis O’Connor and his wife, Rose Cunningham of Bath, he was left an orphan at the age of twelve. His uncle, a lessee of the Belfast and Liverpool theaters, provided him with work as a call-boy and an assistant in scene-painting at the Belfast theater. He married Ann Butler Fairburn on 30 December 1851 at St John the Evangelist in Upper Holloway, and they had two boys: Francis (born 1853) and John Peter (born 1854). Unfortunately Ann died on 17 July 1860 at their home 6 Waverly Place, Marylebone. John then married Ann's half-sister Ellen Fairburn on 9 January 1862 at Islington Parish Church, and they had two sons: Henry (born 1862) and Joseph William (born 1864). His grandson Terence George, by his son John Peter, married Angela Mary O'Connor (née Ashford) – the sister of Daisy Ashford – the young author of the famous book The Young Visiters. 1888 saw John O'Connor's health start to fail through heart disease, and he finally died at Heathcroft, Yately, Hampshire on 23 May 1889. He was survived by his wife Ellen who herself died in 1931 at Edmonton, Middlesex.

== Career ==
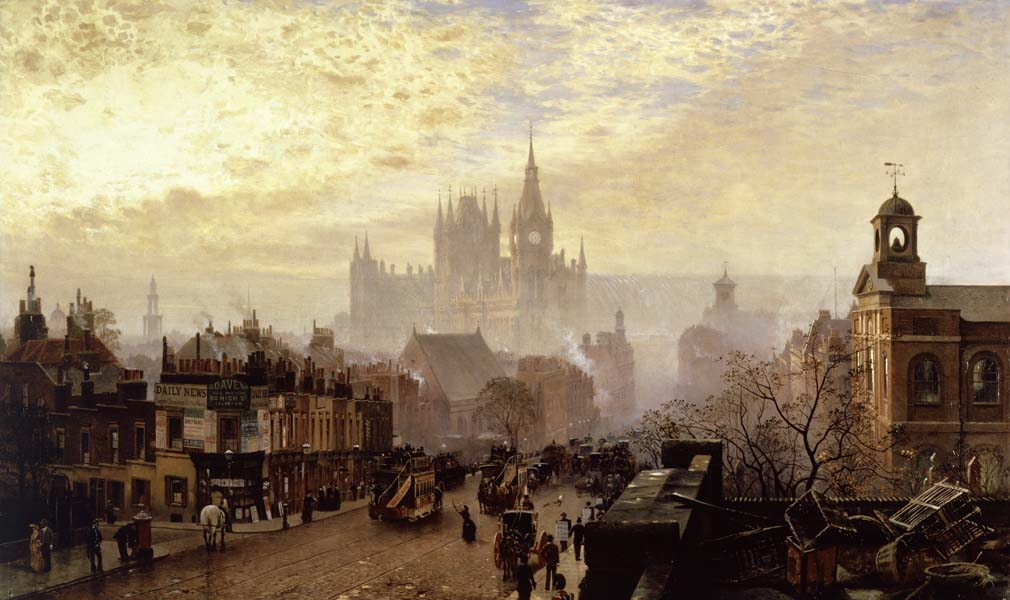
From Pentonville Road Looking West: Evening, 1884. Museum of London.

Having become a proficient painter, O'Connor found employment in 1848 at Drury Lane, and from 1863 was principal Scene Painter at the Haymarket Theatre. In 1879 he was invited by Richard D'Oyly Carte to provide the London settings for a new Gilbert and Sullivan opera, The Pirates of Penzance (1880). (Although The Pirates of Penzance premiered in New York, there is no evidence that his scenery was taken for use in the United States.) The settings were so well admired that O'Connor was asked to be scenic designer for the next Gilbert & Sullivan production of Patience. He began to exhibit at the Society of British Artists in 1854, and at the Royal Academy from 1857 until 1888. During this time he became popular with the royal family, and produced drawings of many important court ceremonials: 1871 Drawing of Marriage of Princess Louise; 1872 Drawing of the Thanksgiving Service in St Paul's; 1874 Drawing of the arrival of Duke/Duchess of Edinburgh at Buckingham Palace; 1887 Drawing of the Jubilee Service, Westminster Abbey. He also exhibited at various exhibitions and galleries, amongst them: 1849 – Painted "Diorama of the Queen's Visit" – exhibited at the Chinese Gallery, London; 1854 – Exhibited Landscapes at the Society of British Artists; the Royal Watercolour Society and the Royal Hibernian Academy from 1875 until his death. He is the Uncle of the scenic artist Joseph Harker.
