= Tantalus (cabinet) =

Cabinet for decanters

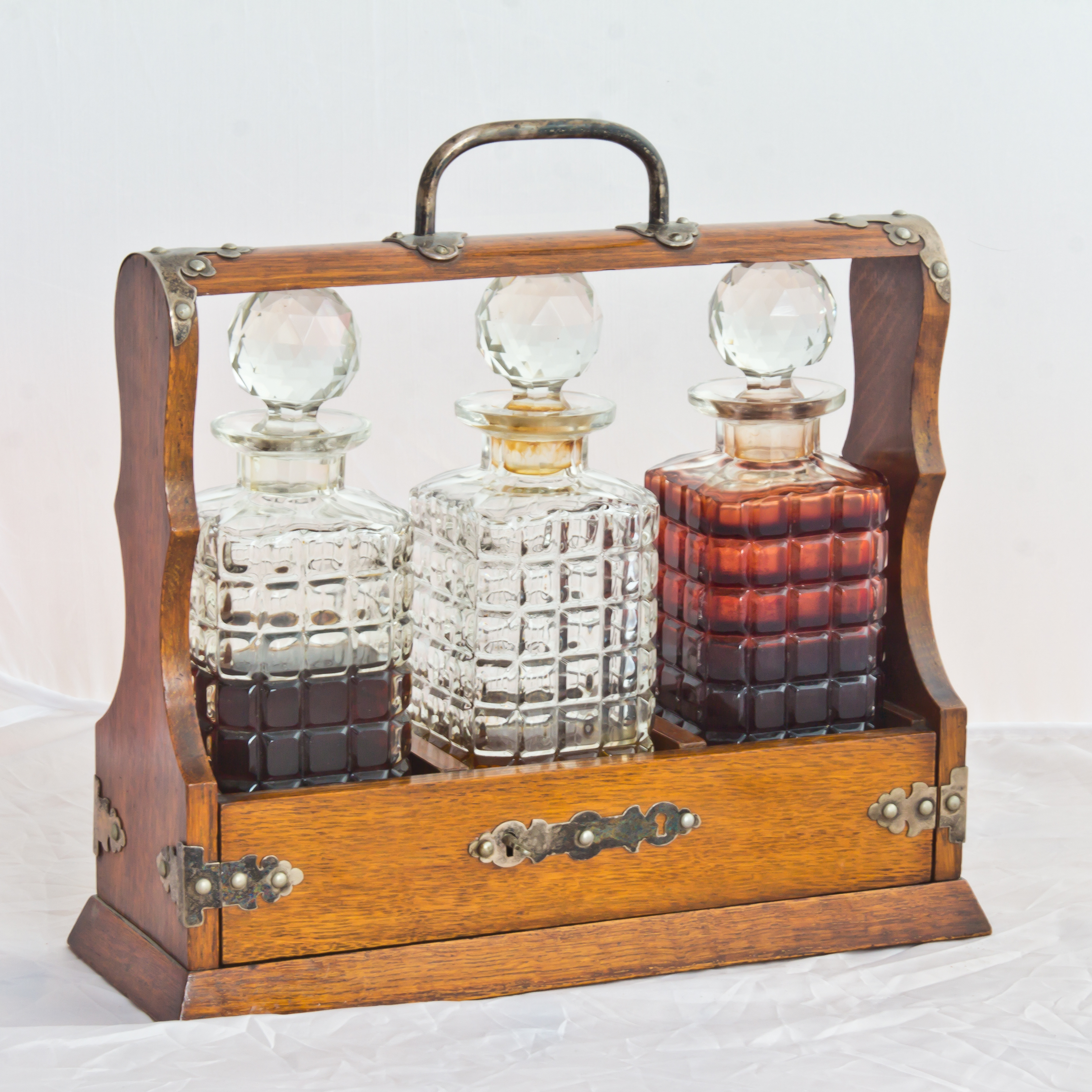
Closed, with the decanters secure

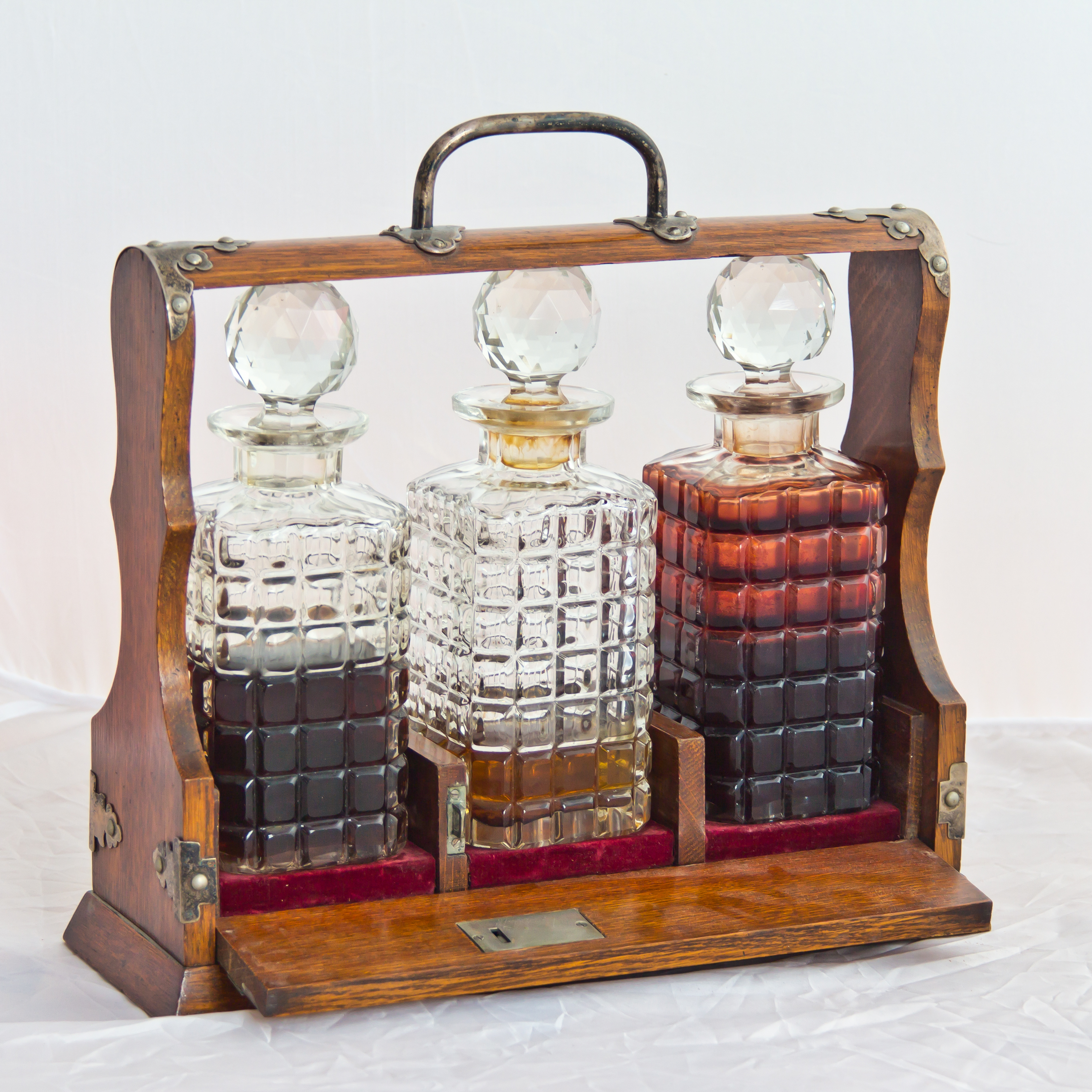
Open, with the decanters accessible

A three-decanter tantalus

A tantalus is a small wooden cabinet containing two or three decanters. Its defining feature is that it has a lock and key. The aim of that is to stop unauthorised people from drinking the contents (in particular, "servants and younger sons getting at the whisky"), while still allowing them to be on show. The name is a reference to the unsatisfied temptations of the Greek mythological character Tantalus.

First patented in 1879 by John Betjemann, son of George Betjemann (a cabinet-maker from Whitechapel). Betjemann & Sons had workshops at 34–42 Pentonville Road, London from the 1830s.

Very few Betjemann examples survive in complete condition; those that do are generally sold at auction for sums in the thousands of US dollars. Original Betjemann articles should have brass or silver plate stamps signifying their authenticity. Later models, in completely different styles, were also called "The Betjemann Tantalus" even though no cabinetry was present and they were not made at the Pentonville works.

Betjemann was the grandfather of the poet John Betjeman, who in Summoned by Bells referred to the tantalus as the source of the family fortune.

== In popular culture ==
In Elizabeth Bowen's The Last September, Livvy Thompson's father is described as a despondent, mild-mannered teetotaller who had "half a decanter of whisky in his tantalus" but had lost the key.

In Ken Follett's Fall of Giants, the friendship between Maud and Ethel begins when Ethel, who "had been too nervous to ask what a tantalus was" when asked to fetch one, is later helped by Maud.
