= St John Street, London =

Historic street in Clerkenwell, Islington, north London, England

Coordinates: 51.52586°N 0.10402°W

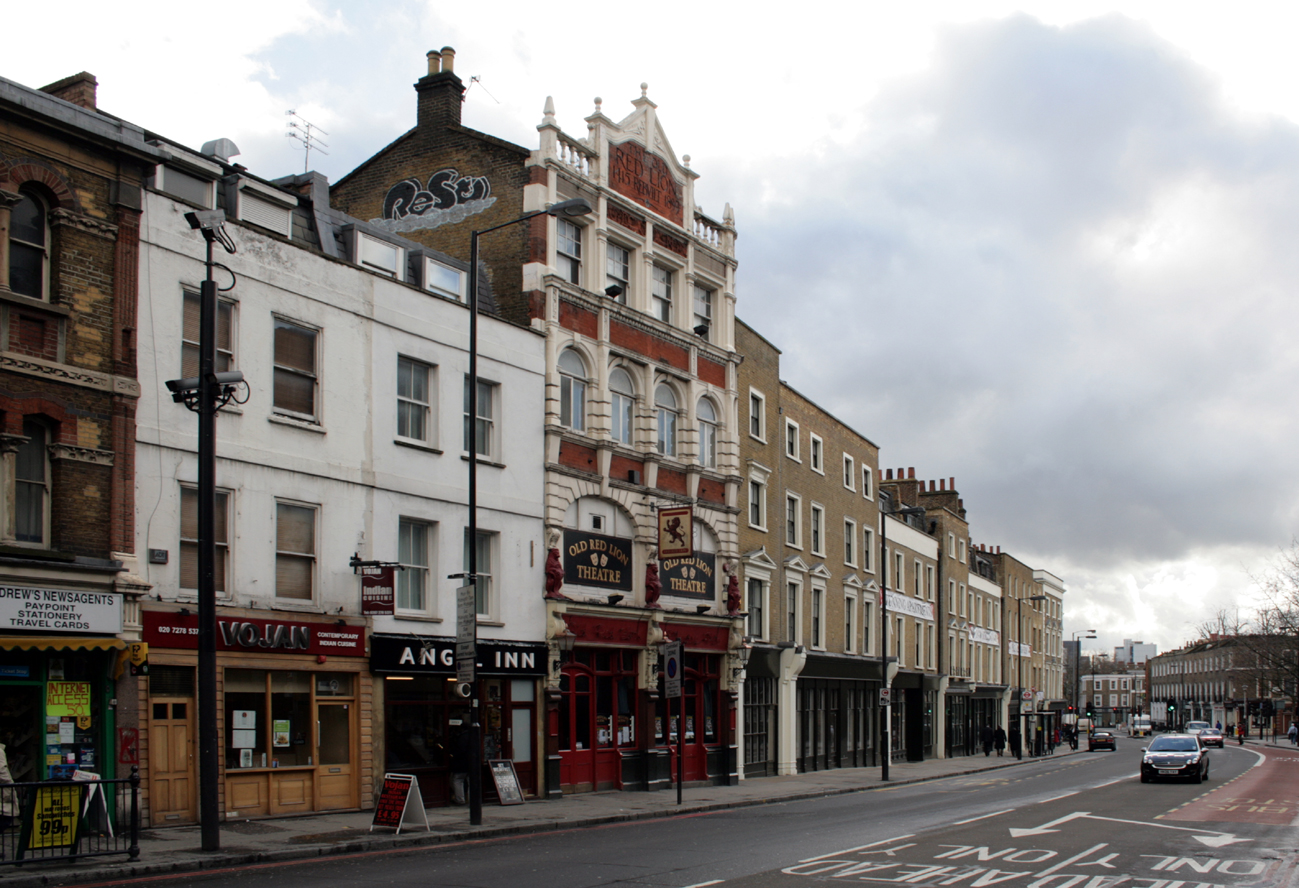
The north end of St John Street

St John Street is a historic street located in Clerkenwell, Islington, north London, England.

The street runs from Smithfield Market and Charterhouse Street in the south to the junction of City Road and Pentonville Road (near Upper Street) in the north, close to the Angel tube station. It is the first section of the original route of the Great North Road.

In 1511, the Knights Hospitaller founded a hermitage on the corner of St John Street and Goswell Road.

The Red Bull Theatre was located on the street between 1604 and 1666, when it was destroyed in the Great Fire of London. James Burnett, Lord Monboddo (1714–1799) lived at 13 St John Street. He held "learned suppers" at his house, with guests including James Boswell, Robert Burns and Samuel Johnson. Nowadays there are many office buildings, restaurants, and bars in the street.
