= Pentonville =

Area in North London, England

Coordinates: 51.532°N 0.114°W

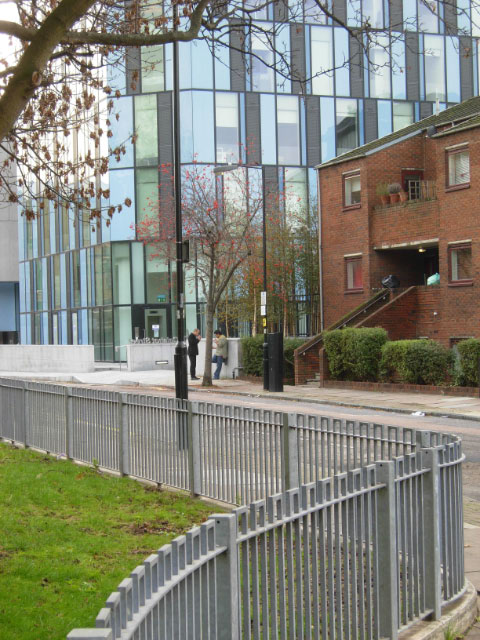

- Location within Greater London
- OS grid reference: TQ315835
  - Charing Cross: 1.75 mi (2.8 km) SSW
- London borough: Islington
- Ceremonial county: Greater London
- Region: London
- Country: England
- Sovereign state: United Kingdom
- Post town: LONDON
- Postcode district: N1
- Dialling code: 020
- Police: Metropolitan
- Fire: London
- Ambulance: London
- UK Parliament: Islington South and Finsbury
- London Assembly: North East

Pentonville is an area in North London, located in the London Borough of Islington. It is located 1 3/4 miles (2.8 kilometres) north-northeast of Charing Cross on the Inner Ring Road. Pentonville developed in the northwestern edge of the ancient parish of Clerkenwell on the New Road. It is named after Henry Penton, the developer of the area.

== History ==
A map showing Pentonville ward of Finsbury Metropolitan Borough as it appeared in 1952.

The area is named after Henry Penton, who developed a number of streets in the 1770s in what was open countryside adjacent to the New Road. Pentonville was part of the ancient parish of Clerkenwell, and was incorporated into the Metropolitan Borough of Finsbury by the London Government Act 1899. It has been part of the London Borough of Islington since 1965. There was a Pentonville ward from 1965 to 1978, electing three councillors to Islington London Borough Council.

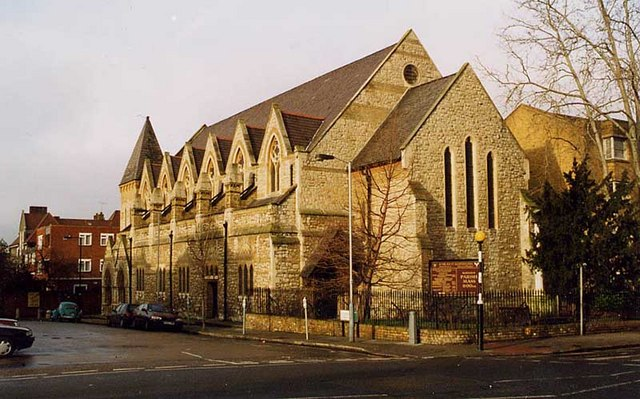
The church of St Silas (Church of England)

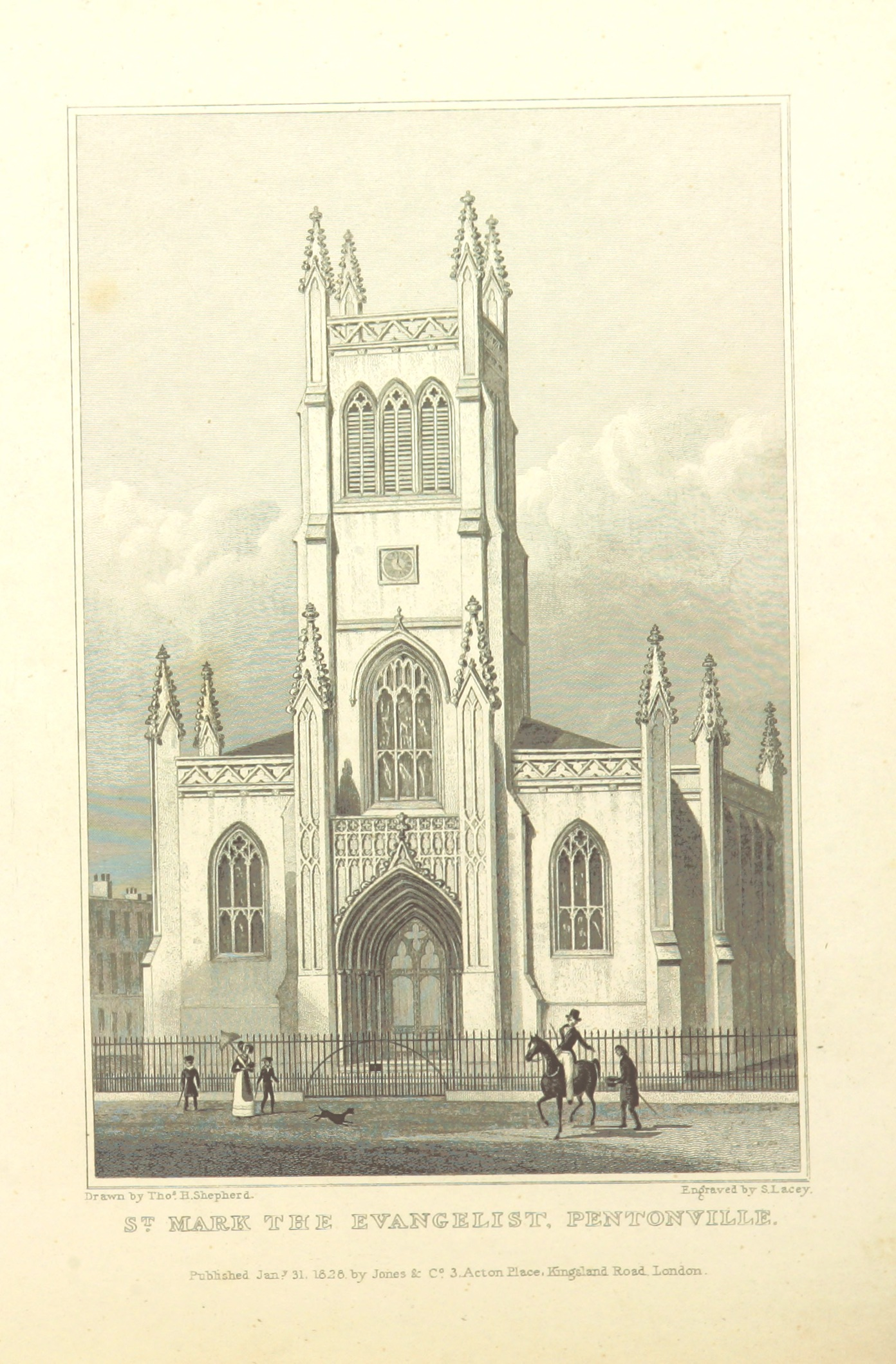
The church of St Mark the Evangelist, 1828 (Church of England)

Pentonville is the birthplace of John Stuart Mill (1806) and Forbes Benignus Winslow (1810), the noted psychiatrist. In 1902 Vladimir Lenin and his wife lived just off Pentonville Road, and it was at this time that he first met his fellow exile Leon Trotsky.

== Geography ==
Nearby places include Islington, St. Pancras and Finsbury.

Pentonville is not the location of HM Prison Pentonville, which is located on Caledonian Road, some distance north in Barnsbury.

== Transport ==
The closest tube stations are Angel and King's Cross St Pancras.

== In popular culture ==
- Mr Brownlow, a character in Charles Dickens' Oliver Twist (1838), lives in "a quiet shady street near Pentonville" in the novel and most film versions. However, in the musical adaptation, Oliver!, he lives in Bloomsbury Square.
- Mr Guppy, a law clerk in Dickens's novel Bleak House (1853), has "lodgings at Penton Place, Pentonville. It is lowly, but airy, open at the back, and considered one of the 'ealthiest outlets."
- Hyacinth Robinson, the central character in Henry James' The Princess Casamassima (1886), lives in Pentonville with his adoptive mother who works as a seamstress.
- "Pentonville" is a track on the Babyshambles album Down in Albion (2005).
