= List of founders of religious traditions =

These are historical figures credited with founding religions or religious philosophies, or who codified older known religious traditions. The list includes those who have founded a specific major denomination within a larger religion.

== Legendary/semi-historical ==
Traditional founder(s)	Historical founder(s)	Life of historical founder	Religious tradition founded	Comparative Religion
Hayk	Armenian people	Alive during 2492 BC	Armenian paganism, later incorporated into Armenian folklore	Paganism
Abraham (covenant with God); Moses (religious law)	Yahwists (Note: The religion of the Israelites of Iron Age I was based on a cult of ancestors and worship of family gods, the "gods of the fathers". With the emergence of the monarchy at the beginning of Iron Age II the kings promoted their family god, YHWH (Yahweh), as the god of the kingdom, but beyond the royal court, religion continued to be both polytheistic and family-centered. As such, this founding group is referred to as "Yahwists".)	c. 13th to 8th century BC (Note: Israel emerges into the historical record in the last decades of the 13th century BCE, at the very end of the Late Bronze Age, as the Canaanite city-state system was ending. In the words of archaeologist William Dever, "most of those who came to call themselves Israelites … were or had been indigenous Canaanites". The worship of YHWH (Yahweh) alone began at the earliest with Elijah in the 9th century BCE, but more likely with the prophet Hosea in the 8th; even then it remained the concern of a small party before gaining ascendancy in the exilic and early post-exilic period.)	Judaism and Samaritanism	Abrahamic religions
Laozi	Zhuang Zhou	369 BC – 286 BC	Taoism	East Asian religions, Chinese Religion
Dido	Phoenicians	Alive during 814 BC	Punic religion	Canaanite religion
Aeneas; Romulus; Numa Pompilius	Ancient Latins	c. 8th to 7th century BC	Roman Religion	Paganism, Interpretatio graeca, Roman Mythology
Simon Magus	N/A (Note: Knowledge of Gnosticism's historical origins is limited (Attridge, et al. "Gnostics and Other Heretics." PBS). Simon Magus was claimed by the Church Fathers to have founded the movement. His traditional role in the foundation of Gnosticism is featured in Acts of the Apostles.)	Unknown; late BC to early AD	Gnosticism, more specifically the Simonians	Abrahamic religions, Christianity

== Ancient (before 500 AD) ==
Founder name	Life of founder	Religious tradition founded	Comparative Religion
Akhenaten	c. 1353 BC – 1336 BC	Atenism	Monotheism
Zoroaster	c. 1000 BC	Zoroastrianism	Iranian religions
Parshvanatha	877 BC – 777 BC	The penultimate (23rd) Tirthankara in Jainism	Indian religions
Nebuchadnezzar II	c. 634 BC – 562 BC	built the Etemenanki, established Marduk as the patron deity of Babylon	Paganism,Ancient Mesopotamian religion, Babylonian Religion
Ajita Kesakambali	6th century BC	Charvaka	Indian religions, Hinduism,
Mahavira	599 BC – 527 BC	The final (24th) tirthankara in Jainism	Indian religions, Jainism
Gautama Buddha	563 BC – 483 BC	Buddhism	Indian religions
Confucius	551 BC – 479 BC	Confucianism	East Asian religions, Chinese Religion
Pythagoras	fl. 520 BC	Pythagoreanism	Ancient Greek philosophy
Mozi	470 BC – 390 BC	Mohism	East Asian religions, Chinese Religion
Zamolxis	5th century BC	Zamolxism	possibly Monotheistic?
Makkhali Gosala	5th century BC	Ājīvika	Indian religions, Hinduism
Ezra	fl. 459 BC (Note: Historicity disputed but widely considered plausible. Gosta W. Ahlstrom argues the inconsistencies of the biblical tradition are insufficient to say that Ezra, with his central position as the 'father of Judaism' in the Jewish tradition, has been a later literary invention. (The History of Ancient Palestine, Fortress Press, p.888))	Second Temple Judaism	Abrahamic religions
Epicurus	fl. 307 BC	Epicureanism	Ancient Greek philosophy
Zeno of Citium	333 BC – 264 BC	Stoicism	Ancient Greek philosophy
Pharnavaz I of Iberia	326 BC – 234 BC	Armazi	Monotheism
Valmiki	c. 3rd century BC	Valmikism	Indian religions, Hinduism
Patanjali	2nd century BC	Rāja yoga sect of Hinduism	Indian religions, Hinduism
Augustus	63 BC - 14 AD	Roman imperial cult	Paganism, Imperial cult
John the Baptist	c. 6 BC – c. AD 30	Mandeaism	Abrahamic religions, Gnosticism
Jesus (and the Twelve Apostles)	c. 4 BC – c. 30/33 AD	Christianity	Abrahamic religions
Paul the Apostle	c. 33 AD	Pauline Christianity	Abrahamic religions, Christianity
James the Just	c. 33 AD	Jewish Christianity	Abrahamic religions, Judaism, Christianity
Lakulisha	1st century AD	Pashupata Shaivism sect of Hinduism	Indian religions, Hinduism
Judah the Prince	2nd century AD	Rabbinic Judaism	Abrahamic religions, Judaism,
Montanus	2nd century AD	Montanism	Abrahamic religions, Christianity
Marcion of Sinope	110–160	Marcionism	Abrahamic religions, Christianity, Gnosticism
Elkesai	170–230	Elkesaism	Abrahamic religions, Christianity, Gnosticism
Nagarjuna	150–250	Madhyamaka	Indian religions, Buddhism
Plotinus	205–270	Neoplatonism	Monotheism, Ancient Greek philosophy
Mani	216–274	Manichaeism	Religious syncretism, Gnosticism
Arius (Note: The teaching of the traditional "founding father" of a "heresy" is may well have differed greatly from the contents of the heresy as generally understood. For references see following notes.)	250–336	Arianism (Note: Acc. to Rowan Williams, 'Arianism' was essentially a polemical creation of Athanasius in an attempt to show that the different alternatives to the Nicene Creed collapsed back into some form of Arius' teaching. (Arius, SCM (2001) p.247))	Abrahamic religions, Christianity
Pelagius	354–430	Pelagianism (Note: Pelagius' thought was one sided and an inadequate interpretation of Christianity, but his disciples, Celestius and, to a greater extent, Julian of Eclanum pushed his ideas to extremes.(Kelly, J.N.D. Early Christian Doctrines A & C. Black (1965) p.361) Pelagius himself was declared orthodox by the synod of Diospolis in 415, after repudiating some of Celestius' opinions. (Frend, W.H.C. Saints and Sinners in the Early Church DLT (1985) p.133))	Abrahamic religions, Christianity
Nestorius	386–451	Nestorianism (Note: Nestorius specifically endorsed the repudiation of "Nestorianism" reached at Chalcedon in 451 (Prestige, G.L. Fathers and Heretics SPCK (1963) p.130))	Abrahamic religions, Christianity
Eutyches	380–456	Monophysitism (Note: Monophysitism represents an advanced type of Alexandrian Theology; it emerged in a distinctive form in 433 as a result of the agreement between John of Antioch and Cyril of Alexandria. The exaggerated form held by Eutyches was condemned in 451 by the Council of Chalcedon. In its moderate forms the divergence from orthodoxy may be simply terminological. Alexandrian Theology stressed both divine transcendence and a marked dualism between the material and the spiritual and so tended to nullify the humanity of Christ.(Cross & Livingstone. The Oxford Dictionary of the Christian Church (1974) arts. Monophysitism, Alexandrian Theology))	Abrahamic religions, Christianity

== Medieval to Early Modern (500–1800 AD) ==
Name	Life of founder	Religious tradition founded	Comparative Religion
Mazdak	died c. 526	Mazdakism	Monotheism
Bodhidharma	5th or 6th century	Zen, more specifically Ch'an	Indian religions, Buddhism
Muhammad	c. 570–632	Islam	Abrahamic religions
Gaudapada	c. 6th century CE	Advaita Vedanta	Indian religions, Hinduism
Songtsen Gampo	7th century	Tibetan Buddhism	Indian religions, Buddhism
En no Gyōja	late 7th century	Shugendō	East Asian religions
Huineng	638–713	East Asian Zen Buddhism	Indian religions, Buddhism
Padmasambhava	8th century	Nyingma	Indian religions, Buddhism
Han Yu	8th or 9th century	Neo-Confucianism	East Asian religions, Chinese Religion, Confucianism
Saichō	767–822	Tendai (descended from Tiantai)	East Asian religions, Buddhism
Kūkai	774–835	Shingon Buddhism	Indian religions, Buddhism
Ibn Nusayr	late 9th century	Alawites	Abrahamic religions, Islam
Matsyendranath	10th century	Nath	Indian religions
Ramanuja	1017–1137	Vishishtadvaita	Indian religions, Hinduism
Great Peacemaker	Between the 10th and 15th centuries	Great Law of Peace	Native American religions, Iroquois mythology
Hamza ibn ‘Alī ibn Aḥmad	11th century	Druze	Abrahamic religions, Greek Philosophy, Atenism
Sheikh Adi ibn Musafir	12th century	Yazidism	Abrahamic religions, Iranian religions
Basava	12th century	Lingayatism	Indian religions
Peter Waldo	1140–1205	Waldensianism	Abrahamic religions, Christianity, Proto-Protestantism
Hōnen	1131–1212	Jōdo-shū (descended from Pure Land Buddhism)	East Asian religions, Indian religions
Eisai	1141–1215	Rinzai Zen (descended from the Linji school)	East Asian religions
Shinran	1173–1263	Jōdo Shinshū (descended from Jōdo-shū)	East Asian religions
Dōgen	1200–1253	Sōtō Zen (descended from the Caodong school)	East Asian religions
Haji Bektash Veli	1209–1271	Bektashi Order of Sufism	Abrahamic religions, Islam
Nichiren	1222–1282	Nichiren Buddhism	Indian religions, Buddhism
Abraham Abulafia	1240–1290s	Prophetic Kabbalah, a.k.a. ecstatic Kabbalah	Abrahamic religions, Judaism,
Dyaneshwar	1275–1296	Varkari	Indian religions, Hinduism
Madhvacharya	1238–1317	Dvaita	Indian religions, Hinduism
John Wycliffe	1320s–1384	Lollardy	Abrahamic religions, Christianity, Proto-Protestantism
Fażlu l-Lāh Astar-Ābādī	14th century	Hurufism	Abrahamic religions, Islam
Mahmoud Pasikhani	late 14th century	Nuqṭawism	Abrahamic religions, Islam
Jan Hus	1372–1415	Hussitism	Abrahamic religions, Christianity, Proto-Protestantism
Tlacaelel	1397–1487	Cult of Huitzilopochtli	Native American religions, Mesoamerican religion, Aztec religion
Ramananda	15th century	Ramanandi Vaishnavism	Indian religions, Hinduism
Kabir	1398–1448	Kabir Panth	Indian religions, Hinduism
Pachacuti	1418–1472	Cult of Inti	Native American religions, Inca mythology
Sankardev	1449–1568	Ekasarana Dharma	Indian religions, Hinduism
Ravidas	c. 1450–1520	Ravidassia	Indian religions
Guru Nanak	1469–1539	Sikhism, Nanak Panth	Indian religions
Sri Chand	1494–1629	Udasi	Indian religions, Sikhism
Vallabha Acharya	1479–1531	Shuddhadvaita	Indian religions, Hinduism
Martin Luther	1483–1546	Lutheranism and Protestantism in general	Abrahamic religions, Christianity, Protestantism
Chaitanya Mahaprabhu	1486–1534	Gaudiya Vaishnavism, Achintya Bheda Abheda	Indian religions, Hinduism
Thomas Cranmer	1489–1556	Anglicanism (Church of England)	Abrahamic religions, Christianity, Protestantism
Menno Simons	1496–1561	Mennonite	Abrahamic religions, Christianity, Protestantism, Anabaptism
Conrad Grebel	1498–1526	Swiss Brethren, Anabaptists	Abrahamic religions, Christianity, Protestantism
Jacob Hutter	1500–1536	Hutterite	Abrahamic religions, Christianity, Protestantism, Anabaptism
Isaac Luria	1534–1572	Lurianic Kabbalah	Abrahamic religions, Judaism, Kabbalah
Sultan Sahak	early 15th century	Yarsanism	Abrahamic religions, Iranian religions
John Calvin	1509–1564	Calvinism	Abrahamic religions, Christianity, Protestantism
Michael Servetus	1511?–1553	Unitarianism	Abrahamic religions, Christianity, Protestantism, Nontrinitarianism
John Knox	1510–1572	Presbyterianism	Abrahamic religions, Christianity, Protestantism, Calvinism
Akbar	1542–1605	Din-i Ilahi	Religious syncretism Abrahamic religions
Jacobus Arminius	1560–1609	Arminianism	Abrahamic religions, Christianity, Protestantism, Calvinism
John Smyth	1570–1612	Baptists	Abrahamic religions, Christianity, Protestantism
Avvakum	1620–1682	Old Believers of Russian Orthodox Church	Abrahamic religions, Christianity
George Fox	1624–1691	Quakers	Abrahamic religions, Christianity,Protestantism, Anglicanism
Philipp Spener	1635–1705	Pietism	Abrahamic religions, Christianity, Protestantism, Lutheran
Jakob Ammann	1656–1730	Amish	Abrahamic religions, Christianity, Protestantism
Emanuel Swedenborg	1688–1772	The New Church	Abrahamic religions, Christianity, Protestantism
Yisroel ben Eliezer "Baal Shem Tov"	1698–1760	Hasidic Judaism	Abrahamic religions, Christianity, Protestantism
John Wesley, Charles Wesley, George Whitefield	1703–1791	Methodism	Abrahamic religions, Christianity,Protestantism, Anglicanism
Muhammad Ibn Abd al-Wahhab	1703–1792	Wahhabism	Abrahamic religions, Sunni Islam
Ann Lee	1736–1784	Shakers	Abrahamic religions, Christianity, Protestantism, Quakers

== New religious movements (post-1800) ==
Name	Life of founder	Religious tradition founded	Comparative Religion
Shaykh Ahmad al-Ahsá'í	1753–1826	Shaykhism, precursor of Bábism	Religious syncretism: Abrahamic religions,Iranian religions, Indian religions,East Asian religions
Nicolas François de Neufchâteau	1750-1828	Decadary Cult	Secular religion
Antoine-François Momoro	1756-1794	Cult of Reason	Secular religion
Maximilien Robespierre	1758-1794	Cult of the Supreme Being	Secular religion
Jean-Baptiste Chemin-Dupontès	1760-1852	Theophilanthropy	Deist
Ram Mohan Roy	1772–1833	Brahmo Samaj	Indian religions, Hinduism
Swaminarayan	1781–1830	Swaminarayan Sampraday	Indian religions, Hinduism
Auguste Comte	1798–1857	Religion of Humanity	Secular religion
Nakayama Miki	1798–1887	Tenrikyo	East Asian religions, Japanese new religions
Ignaz von Döllinger	1799–1890	Old Catholic Church	Abrahamic religions, Christianity
Phineas Quimby	1802–1866	New Thought	Spirituality
Allan Kardec (founder of the religion); Holy Spirit (made the teachings)	1804–1869	Spiritism	Spiritualism (movement)
Joseph Smith	1805–1844	Mormonism, also known as the Latter Day Saint movement	Abrahamic religions, Christianity, Nontrinitarianism, Restorationism
John Thomas	1805–1871	Christadelphians	Abrahamic religions, Christianity, Nontrinitarianism, Restorationism
Abraham Geiger	1810–1874	Reform Judaism	Abrahamic religions
Jamgon Kongtrul	1813–1899	Rimé movement	Indian religions, Buddhism, Tibetan Buddhism
Hong Xiuquan	1814–1864	Taiping Christianity	Religious syncretism, Abrahamic religions, Christianity
Bahá'u'lláh	1817–1892	Baháʼí Faith	Religious syncretism: Abrahamic religions, Iranian religions, Indian religions,East Asian religions
Báb	1819–1850	Bábism, precursor of the Baháʼí Faith	Religious syncretism: Abrahamic religions,Iranian religions, Indian religions,East Asian religions
Azriel Hildesheimer	1820–1899	Modern Orthodox Judaism	Abrahamic religions
James Springer White	1821–1881	Seventh-day Adventist Church	Abrahamic religions, Christianity, Protestantism, Anglicanism, Methodism, Millerism
Wang Jueyi	1821–1884	Yiguandao	East Asian religions, Chinese Religion, Chinese salvationist religions
Mary Baker Eddy	1821–1910	Christian Science	Abrahamic religions, Christianity
Ramalinga Swamigal	1823–1874	Samarasa Sutha Sanmarga Sangam	Indian religions, Hinduism
Dayananda Saraswati	1824–1883	Arya Samaj	Indian religions, Hinduism
Ellen G. White	1827–1915	Seventh-day Adventist Church	Abrahamic religions, Christianity, Protestantism, Anglicanism, Methodism, Millerism
John Ballou Newbrough	1828–1891	Faithism	Abrahamic religions, Christianity, Spiritualism (movement)
Helena Blavatsky	1831–1891	Theosophy	Spiritualism (movement)
Subh-i-Azal	1831–1912	Azalism	Religious syncretism: Abrahamic religions,Iranian religions, Indian religions,East Asian religions
Ayya Vaikundar	1833–1851	Ayyavazhi	Indian religions, Hinduism
Mirza Ghulam Ahmad	1835–1908	Ahmadiyya	Religious syncretism: Abrahamic religions,Iranian religions, Indian religions,East Asian religions
Nao Deguchi	1837–1918	Oomoto	East Asian religions, Japanese new religions
John Slocum	1838–1897	Indian Shaker Church	Abrahamic religions, Christianity, Protestantism, Quakers, Shakers
Guido von List	1848–1919	Armanism (Germanic mysticism)	Occult
Charles Taze Russell	1852–1916	Bible Student movement	Abrahamic religions, Christianity, Nontrinitarianism, Restorationism
Wovoka	1856–1932	Ghost Dance	Native American Religions, Spiritualism (movement)
Rudolf Steiner	1861–1925	Anthroposophy	Occult
Swami Vivekananda	1863–1902	Ramakrishna Mission	Indian religions, Hinduism
William Irvine	1863–1947	Two by Twos and Cooneyites	Abrahamic religions, Christianity, Protestantism, Nontrinitarianism, Evangelicalism
Max Heindel	1865–1919	The Rosicrucian Fellowship	Occult
Tsunesaburo Makiguchi	1871–1944	Soka Gakkai	Indian religions, Buddhism
Sri Aurobindo	1872–1950	Integral yoga	Indian religions, Hinduism
Mason Remey	1874–1974	Orthodox Baháʼí Faith	Abrahamic religions
Aleister Crowley	1875–1947	Thelema	Occult
Charles Fox Parham	1873–1929	Pentecostalism	Abrahamic religions, Christianity, Protestantism, Anglicanism, Methodism, Holiness Movement
Rudolf von Sebottendorf	1875-1945	Thule Society	Occult, Esoteric Nazism
"Father Divine"	c. 1876–1965	International Peace Mission movement	Monotheism
Edgar Cayce	1877–1945	Association for Research and Enlightenment	Spiritualism
Ngô Văn Chiêu	1878–1926	Caodaism	East Asian religions, Vietnamese Religion
Guy Ballard	1878–1939	"I AM" Activity	New Age
Frank Buchman	1878–1961	Oxford Group/Moral Re-Armament	Abrahamic religions, Christianity, Protestantism
Alfred G. Moses	1878–1956	Jewish Science	Abrahamic religions, Judaism
Ōnishi Aijirō	1881–1958	Honmichi	East Asian religions, Japanese new religions
Mordecai Kaplan	1881–1983	Reconstructionist Judaism	Abrahamic religions, Judaism
Gerald Gardner	1884–1964	Wicca	Neo-Paganism
Felix Manalo	1886–1963	Iglesia ni Cristo (Church of Christ)	Abrahamic religions, Christianity, Nontrinitarianism, Restorationism
Frank B. Robinson	1886–1948	Psychiana	Spiritualism
Noble Drew Ali	1886–1929	Moorish Science Temple of America	Abrahamic religions, Islam
Marcus Garvey	1887–1940	Rastafari	Abrahamic religions, Christianity
Ernest Holmes	1887–1960	Religious Science	Spiritualism
Sadafal Deo Ji Maharaj	1888–1954	Vihangamyoga	Indian religions, Hinduism
Aimee Semple McPherson	1890–1944	Foursquare Church	Abrahamic religions, Christianity, Protestantism, Evangelicalism
Zélio Fernandino de Moraes	1891–1975	Umbanda	Syncretism
Ida B. Robinson	1891–1946	Mount Sinai Holy Church of America	Abrahamic religions, Christianity, Protestantism, Anglicanism, Methodism, Holiness Movement
B. R. Ambedkar	1891–1956	Navayana Buddhism	Indian religions, Buddhism
Wallace Fard Muhammad	1891–1934 (absentia)	Nation of Islam	Abrahamic religions, Islam, Moorish Science Temple of America
Paramahansa Yogananda	1893–1952	Yogoda Satsanga Society of India, Self-Realization Fellowship	Indian religions, Hinduism
Masaharu Taniguchi	1893–1985	Seicho-no-Ie	East Asian religions, Japanese new religions
A. C. Bhaktivedanta Swami Prabhupada	1896–1977	International Society for Krishna Consciousness	Indian religions, Hinduism
Ruth Norman	1900–1993	Unarius	UFO Religions
Ross Nichols	1902-1975	Order of Bards, Ovates, and Druids	Druidry
Swami Muktananda	1908–1982	Siddha Yoga	Indian religions, Hinduism
Paul Twitchell	1908–1971	Eckankar	Monotheism
Ikurō Teshima	1910–1973	Makuya	East Asian religions, Japanese new religions
L. Ron Hubbard	1911–1986	Scientology	Dianetics
Kim Il Sung	1912-1994	North Korean cult of personality	Imperial cult
Chinmayananda Saraswati	1916–1993	Chinmaya Mission	Indian religions, Hinduism
Victor Henry Anderson	1917–2001	Feri Tradition	Neo-Paganism
Maharishi Mahesh Yogi	1918–2008	Transcendental Meditation	Indian religions, Hinduism
Samael Aun Weor	1917–1977	Universal Christian Gnostic Movement	Abrahamic religions, Christianity, Gnosticism
Mark L. Prophet	1918–1973	The Summit Lighthouse	Religious syncretism: Abrahamic religions,Iranian religions, Indian religions,East Asian religions
Ben Klassen	1918–1993	Creativity	Atheisim, White Supremecey
Ahn Sahng-hong	1918–1985	World Mission Society Church of God	Abrahamic religions, Christianity
Huỳnh Phú Sổ	1919–1947	Hòa Hảo	East Asian religions, Vietnamese Religion
Yong (Sun) Myung Moon	1920–2012	Unification Church	Abrahamic religions, Christianity
Prabhat Ranjan Sarkar	1921–1990	Ananda Marga	Indian religions, Hinduism
Clarence 13X	1922–1969	Five-Percent Nation	Abrahamic religions, Islam, Moorish Science Temple of America, Nation of Islam
Mestre Gabriel	1922–1971	União do Vegetal	Syncretism
Nirmala Srivastava	1923–2011	Sahaja Yoga	Indian religions, Hinduism
Sveinbjörn Beinteinsson	1924–1993	Ásatrú	Neo-Paganism
Sathya Sai Baba	1926–2011	Sathya Sai Organization	Indian religions, Hinduism
Michel Potay	1929–	Pilgrims of Arès	Abrahamic religions, Christianity, Restorationist
Anton LaVey	1930–1997	Church of Satan (LaVeyan Satanism)	Abrahamic religions, Atheist
Rajneesh	1931–1990	Rajneesh movement	Indian religions, Hinduism
Mark L. Prophet; Elizabeth Clare Prophet	1918–1973; 1939–2009	Church Universal and Triumphant	Religious syncretism
Adi Da	1939–2008	Adidam	Spiritualism
Claude Vorilhon	1946–	Raëlism	UFO Religions
Marshall Vian Summers	1949–	New Message from God	Spiritualism
Li Hongzhi	born 1951 or 1952	Falun Gong	East Asian religions, Chinese Religion, Chinese salvationist religions
Ryuho Okawa	1956–2023	Happy Science	Japanese new religions
Vissarion	1961–	Church of the Last Testament	Abrahamic religions
Chris Korda	1962–	Church of Euthanasia	Apocalyptic
Tamara Siuda	1969–	Kemetic Orthodoxy	Neo-Paganism
Olumba Olumba Obu	1918–2003	Brotherhood of the Cross and Star	Abrahamic religions
Erdoğan Çınar	21st century	Ishikism	Abrahamic religions
J.R. "Bob" Dobbs	1972–	Church of the SubGenius	parody religion
Bobby Henderson	1980-	Pastafarianism	parody religion
Abdullah Hashem	1983–	Ahmadi Religion of Peace and Light	Abrahamic religions, Islam
Isak Gerson	1993–	Missionary Church of Kopimism	Cybersectarianism

== See also ==
- Burial places of founders of world religions
- List of Buddha claimants
- List of messiah claimants
- List of people who have been considered deities
- List of religions and spiritual traditions
- Lists of religious leaders by century
- Timeline of religion

== Bibliography ==
- Beit-Hallahmi, Benjamin (1998). The Illustrated Encyclopedia of Active New Religions, Sects, and Cults (Revised ed.). Rosen Publishing Group. ISBN 978-0-8239-2586-5.
- Brueggemann, Walter (2002). Reverberations of Faith: A Theological Handbook of Old Testament Themes. Westminster John Knox Press. ISBN 978-0-664-22231-4.
- Chryssides, George D. (2001). Historical dictionary of new religious movements. The Scarecrow Press, Inc. ISBN 978-0-8108-4095-9.
- Cousins, LS (1996), "The dating of the historical Buddha: a review article", Journal of the Royal Asiatic Society, 3, 6 (1): 57–63, doi:10.1017/s1356186300014760, S2CID 162929573
- Jestice, Phyllis G. (2004). Holy People of the World: A Cross-cultural Encyclopedia (Volume 3). ABC-CLIO, Inc. ISBN 978-1-57607-355-1.
- Melton, J. Gordon (2003). Encyclopedia of American Religions (Seventh ed.). Farmington Hills, Michigan: The Gale Group, Inc. ISBN 978-0-7876-6384-1.
- Radhakrishnan, Sarvepalli; Moore, Charles (1957). A Source Book in Indian Philosophy. Princeton University Press. ISBN 978-0-691-01958-1.
- Riegel, J (3 July 2002). "Confucius". Stanford Encyclopedia of Philosophy.
- Schumann, Hans Wolfgang (2003), The Historical Buddha: The Times, Life, and Teachings of the Founder of Buddhism, Motilal Banarsidass, ISBN 978-8120818170
- Smith, Christian; Joshua Prokopy (1999). Latin American Religion in Motion. New York: Routledge. ISBN 978-0-415-92106-0.
- Singh, Upinder (2016), A History of Ancient and Early Medieval India: From the Stone Age to the 12th Century, Pearson Education, ISBN 978-93-325-6996-6
- Zimmer, Heinrich (1953) [April 1952], Campbell, Joseph (ed.), Philosophies Of India, London: Routledge & Kegan Paul Ltd, ISBN 978-81-208-0739-6
