= List of people claimed to be immortal in myth and legend =

This is a list of people claimed to be immortal. This list does not reference purely spiritual entities (spirits, gods, demons, angels), non-humans (monsters, aliens, elves), or artificial life (artificial intelligence, robots).

This list comprises people claimed to achieve a deathless existence on Earth. This list does not contain those people who are supposed to have attained immortality through the typical means of a religion, such as a Christian in Heaven. It also does not include people whose immortality involves living in a place not on Earth, such as Heracles on Mount Olympus or the Eight Immortals of Taoism in Mount Penglai. It also does not include people who, according to their religion, became deities or actually were deities the whole time, such as Jesus of Nazareth (who as part of the Trinity was, according to Christianity, also God) or Parashurama according to Hindu mythology.

== List ==
These listings are in chronological order, though some dates are approximate.

- Ziusudra, the last king of Sumer prior to the Great Flood. His story is known from only a single fragmented tablet datable by its script to the 17th century BC. He was commanded to build a boat by the god Enki and the tablet describes the flood. After a break in the text, Ziusudra is described prostrating himself to the gods An and Enlil, who grant him immortality.
- Endymion , a shepherd in the Mount Latmus of Asia Minor. Selene fell in love with him at first sight, but Endymion is a mortal, would eventually die naturally, so Selene asked Zeus to grant Endymion eternal life, but the price was long sleep. Endymion still maintained a beautiful face and a gratifying smile after he fell asleep. Selene was deeply moved by Endymion's beauty, so she would spy on him in the cave every night.
- Tithonus, who in Greek mythology was granted eternal life but not eternal youth. He was transformed into a grasshopper.
- Ashwatthama, a Kaurava warrior from the Mahabharata, cursed by Krishna following the Kurukshetra War for his attempt to end the Pandava lineage after the cessation of hostilities. He is regarded to be a chiranjivi, an immortal being, who still roams the world with foul-smelling fluids oozing from his form.
- Hanuman, a vanara figure from the Ramayana and a companion of Rama, is described to be immortal in Hindu epics. He is believed to live in the Himalayas.
- The Wandering Jew (b. 1st century BC), a Jewish shoemaker. According to legend, he taunted Jesus on his way to crucifixion. Jesus cursed him to "go on forever till I return." Thus, the Wandering Jew is to live until the second coming of Jesus.
- John the Apostle (AD 6–101), one of Jesus's followers. Some Latter-Day Saints, in conjunction with their own scriptures, interpret the biblical scripture found at John 21:21-23 to mean that John will tarry or remain on the earth until the Second Coming.
- The Three Nephites (between AD 34 and 35), three men described in the Book of Mormon who are given power over death in order to fulfill their desire to minister among men until Jesus comes again.
- Markandeya, a sage who was granted the boon of immortality at the age of sixteen by the Hindu deity Shiva after he was saved from the noose of the god of death, Yama.
- Sir Galahad (born 2nd-6th century), one of the only three Arthurian knights to find the Holy Grail. Of these questing knights, Galahad is the only one to have achieved immortality by it.
- Merlin (2nd-6th century), the famous magician. In some accounts, Merlin is trapped by an enchantment by Nimue, and while some end with Merlin dying, in others he remains in the trap (variously a tomb, a cave, a mist, or a tree) indefinitely.
- Morgan le Fay (c. 480 – ), Enchantress from the legend of King Arthur.
- Nicolas Flamel (c. 1330 – ), a French scribe and manuscript seller. He is believed to have found and decoded the everchanging book of Abraham the Mage, and found a spell for immortality, along with his wife, Perenelle Flamel.
- Count of St. Germain. Myths, legends, and speculations about St. Germain began to be widespread in the late 19th and early 20th centuries, and continue today. They include beliefs that he is immortal.
- Mahavatar Babaji (30 November 203 BCE), an Indian Kriya Yoga guru who is believed to have manifested 5,000 years ago in India and is still presently alive in his physical body. He is reputed to live in India or at the Himalaya mountain.
- Olumba Olumba (born 1918) is a Nigerian religious leader and founder of Brotherhood of the Cross and Star, an alleged evil cult and new religion. Olumba claimed to be the Abrahamic God in human form. Members of his religion claim he is immortal.
- Khidr. In Islamic mythology "Al-Khidr" or "The Green" is a guide and servant for other prophets. He is considered an immortal human who, depending on the versions, is most commonly a human servant or prophet of God, although he has also been considered an angel.

== Failed quests for immortality ==
- Gilgamesh (possibly reigned during the 26th century BC) pursued immortality after the death of his companion, Enkidu, to avoid Enkidu's fate. Gilgamesh failed two tests and did not become immortal, realising instead that mortals attain immortality through lasting works of civilization and culture. Gilgamesh's story is among the oldest stories recorded.
- Qin Shi Huang (reigned 259 BC–210 BC), the first emperor of China who sought immortality in his old age. Twice he sent hundreds of people under the direction of Xu Fu to find the legendary elixir of life, but failed. He allegedly died of mercury poisoning after he had eaten too many mercury pills, which had been prescribed by his court doctors to make him immortal.
- Ravana, a king in Hindu mythology. Ravana was an ambitious brahmin who went on to lead the asuras or demons on several wars against the gods. He prayed to Brahma for immortality, and was granted the boon of invincibility against all of Brahma's creations except for humans. Ravana was later killed by Rama, who was incarnated as a human.
