= List of burial places of founders of religious traditions =

This article lists burial places of founders of world religions. If there is no burial place, the place of death is mentioned.

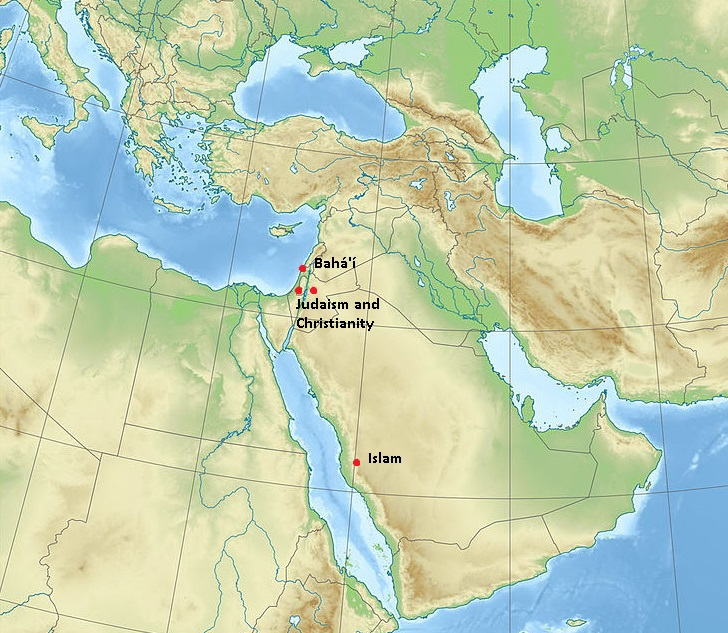
Map of burial places of founders of Abrahamic religions.

== Bábism ==
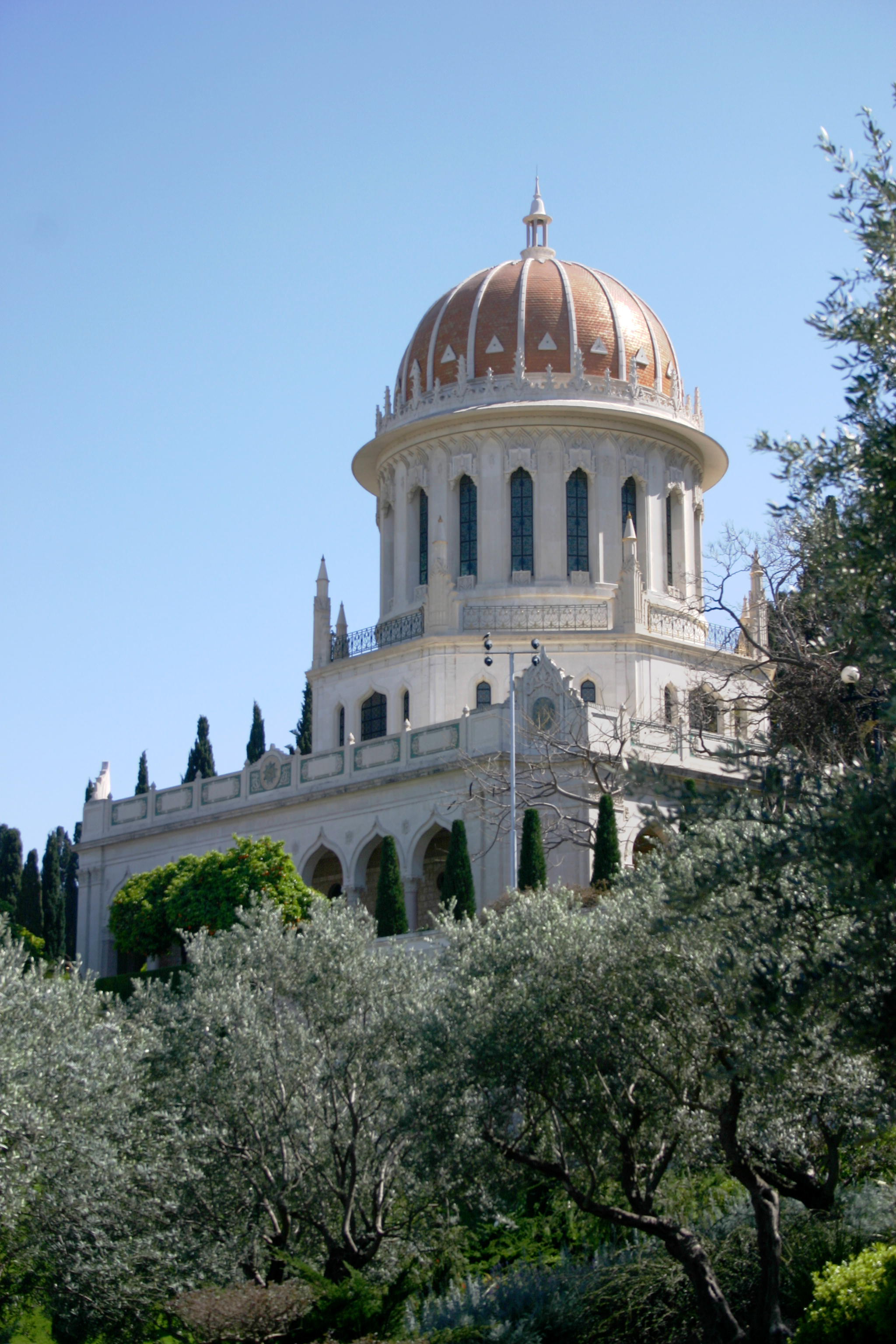
Shrine of the Báb

The Shrine of the Báb, the burial location of the Báb, the founder of Bábism and one of three central figures of the Baháʼí Faith, is located on Mount Carmel, in Haifa, Israel.

== Baháʼí Faith ==
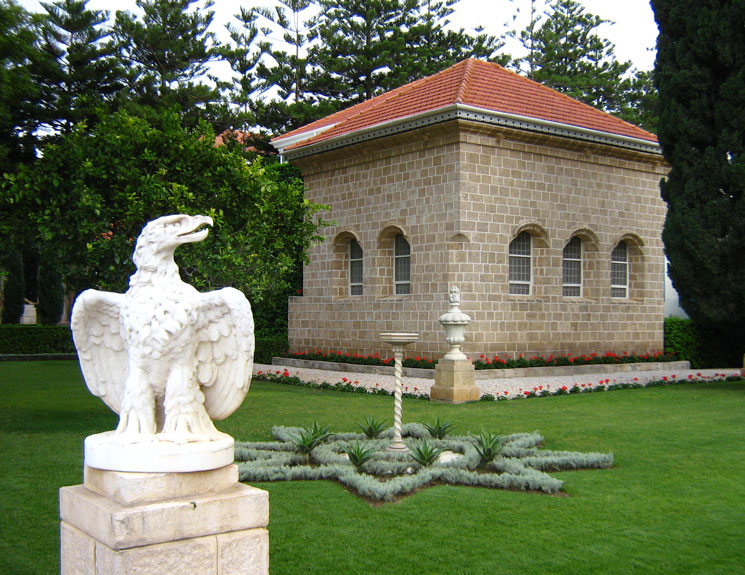
Shrine of Bahá'u'lláh

Located in Bahji near Acre, Israel, the Shrine of Baháʼu'lláh is the most holy place for followers of the Baháʼí Faith. This also serves as their Qiblih, or direction of prayer. It contains the remains of Baháʼu'lláh, founder of the Baháʼí Faith and is near the spot where he died in the Mansion of Bahji.

== Buddhism ==
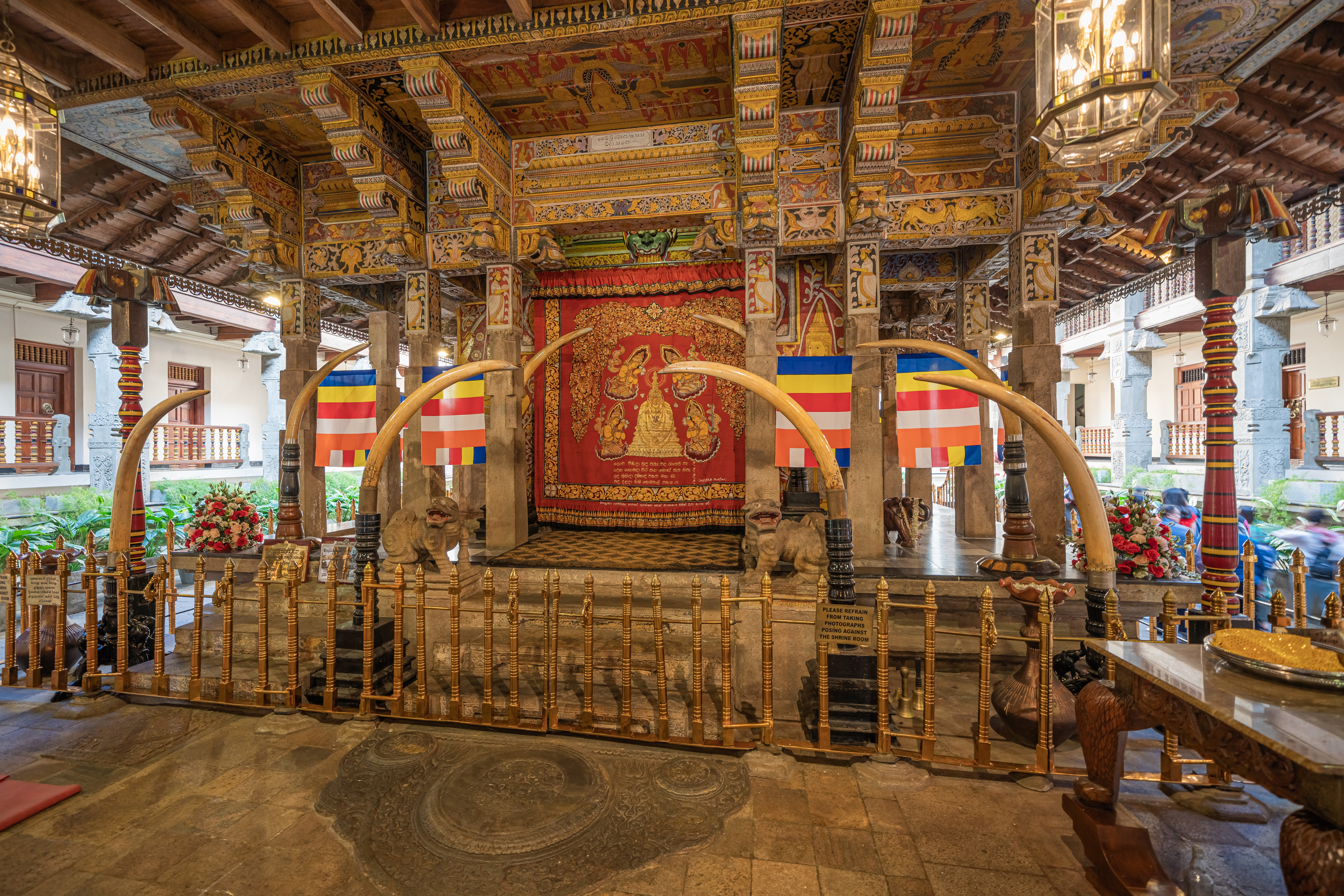
The tooth relic of Buddha is placed in this sanctum in Kandy, Sri Lanka

Gautama Buddha's body was cremated in Kushinagar, India and the relics were placed in monuments or stupas, some of which are believed to have survived until the present. Ramabhar Stupa in Kushinagar was built over a portion of the Buddha's ashes on the spot where he was cremated by the ancient Malla people. The Temple of the Tooth or Dalada Maligawa in Sri Lanka is the place where the relic of the tooth of the Buddha is kept at present.

== Christianity ==
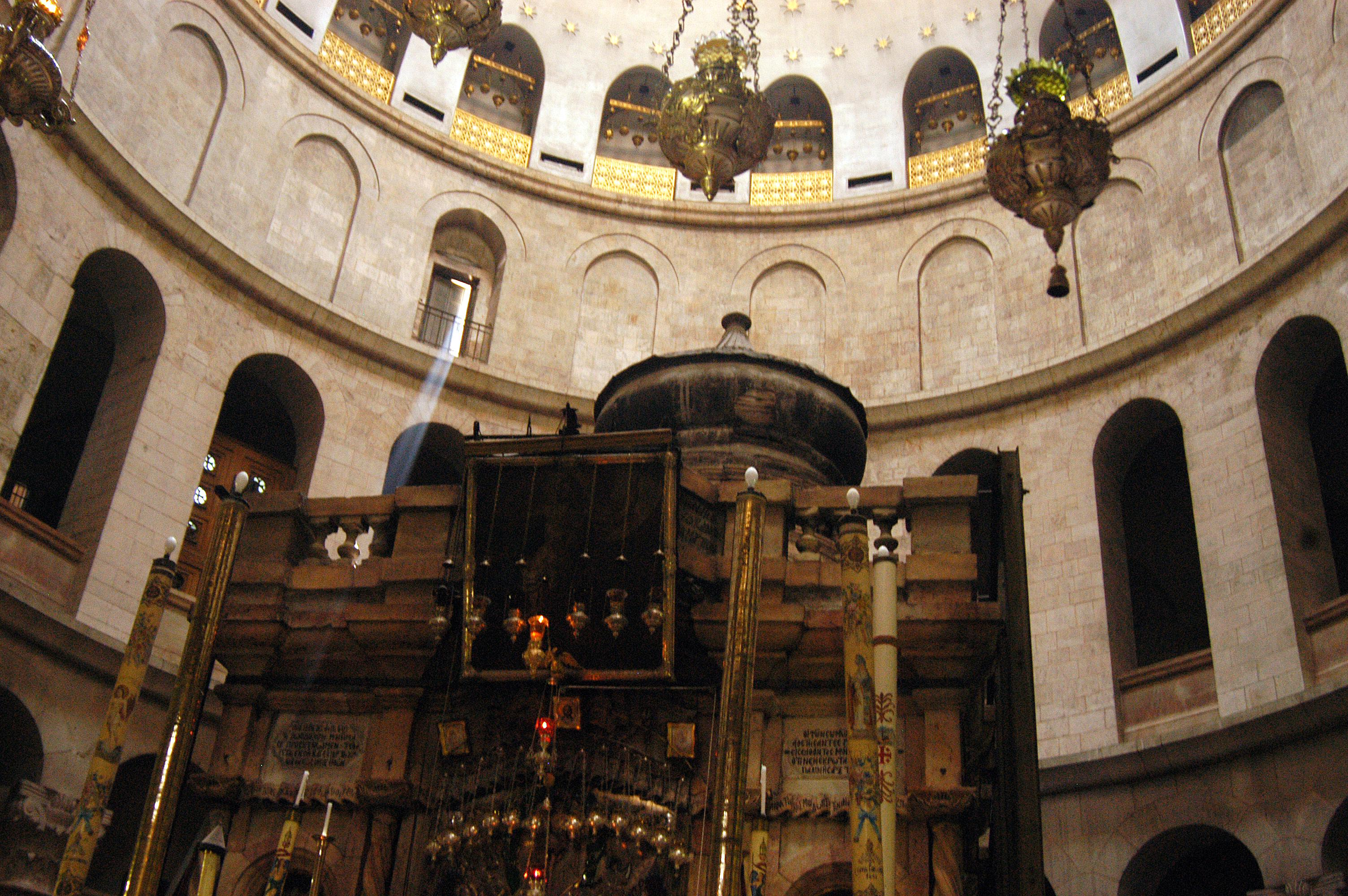
The Edicule of the Holy Sepulchre in Jerusalem, the burial site of Jesus Christ

A number of claimed relics associated with Jesus have been displayed throughout the history of Christianity. While some individuals believe in the authenticity of Jesus relics, others doubt their validity. For instance, the sixteenth-century philosopher Erasmus wrote about the proliferation of relics, and the number of buildings that could be constructed from wooden relics claimed to be from the crucifixion cross of Jesus. Similarly, at least thirty Holy Nails were venerated as relics across Europe in the early 20th century. Part of the relics are included in the so-called Arma Christi ("Weapons of Christ"), or the Instruments of the Passion.

Some relics, such as remnants of the crown of thorns, receive only a modest number of pilgrims, while others, such as the Shroud of Turin, receive millions of pilgrims, including Pope John Paul II, Pope Benedict XVI, and Pope Francis.

As Christian teaching generally states that Christ was assumed into heaven corporeally, there are few bodily relics. A notable exception is the Holy Foreskin of Jesus.

According to early Christian sources, the Church of the Holy Sepulchre occupies the location where Jesus is said to have been entombed between his crucifixion and resurrection. It is located in the Christian Quarter of the Old City of Jerusalem.

A second site, known as the Garden Tomb, located just outside Jerusalem's Old City has become a popular Protestant alternative to the Church of the Holy Sepulchre, which is dominated by the Catholic and Eastern Orthodox faiths.

=== Protestantism ===
==== Anglicanism ====
King Henry VIII was buried with other members of the English (and later British) royal family in St George's Chapel, Windsor Castle.

==== Calvinism ====
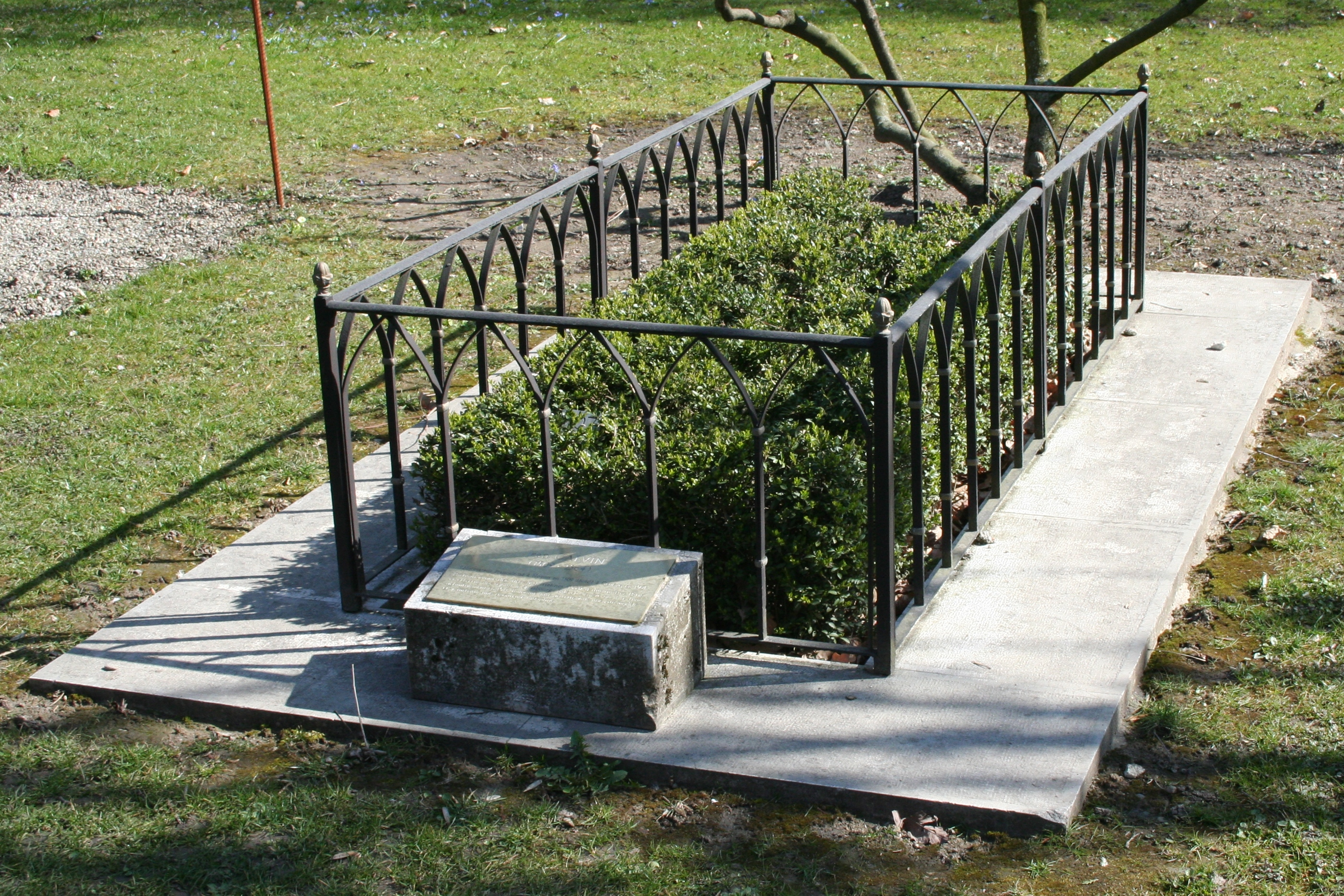
"Traditional" grave of John Calvin in the "Cimetière des Rois" in Geneva (the exact location of his burial is unknown).

The exact location of John Calvin's burial is unknown.

==== Lutheranism ====
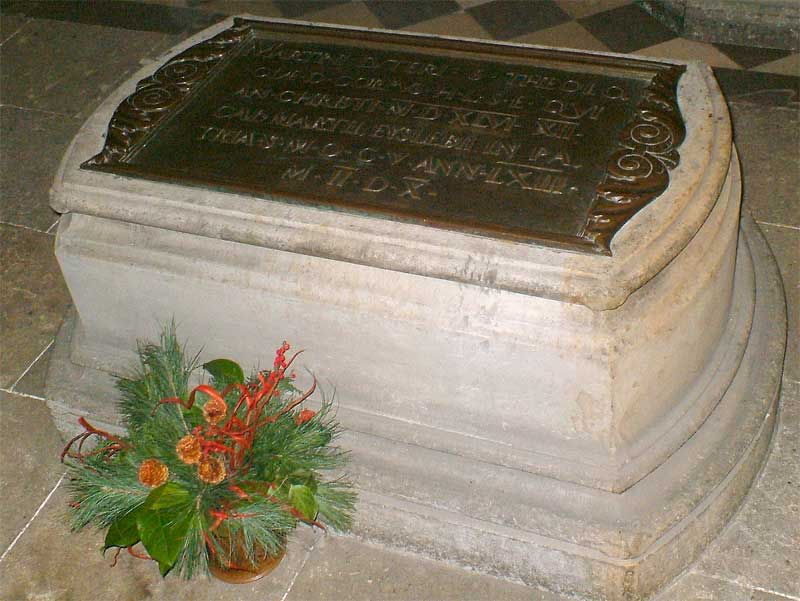
Martin Luther's grave

Upon his death, Martin Luther was buried in All Saints' Church in Wittenberg. This was the formerly Catholic Church to which he nailed his 95 theses. Today, it is a Lutheran church.

==== Methodism ====
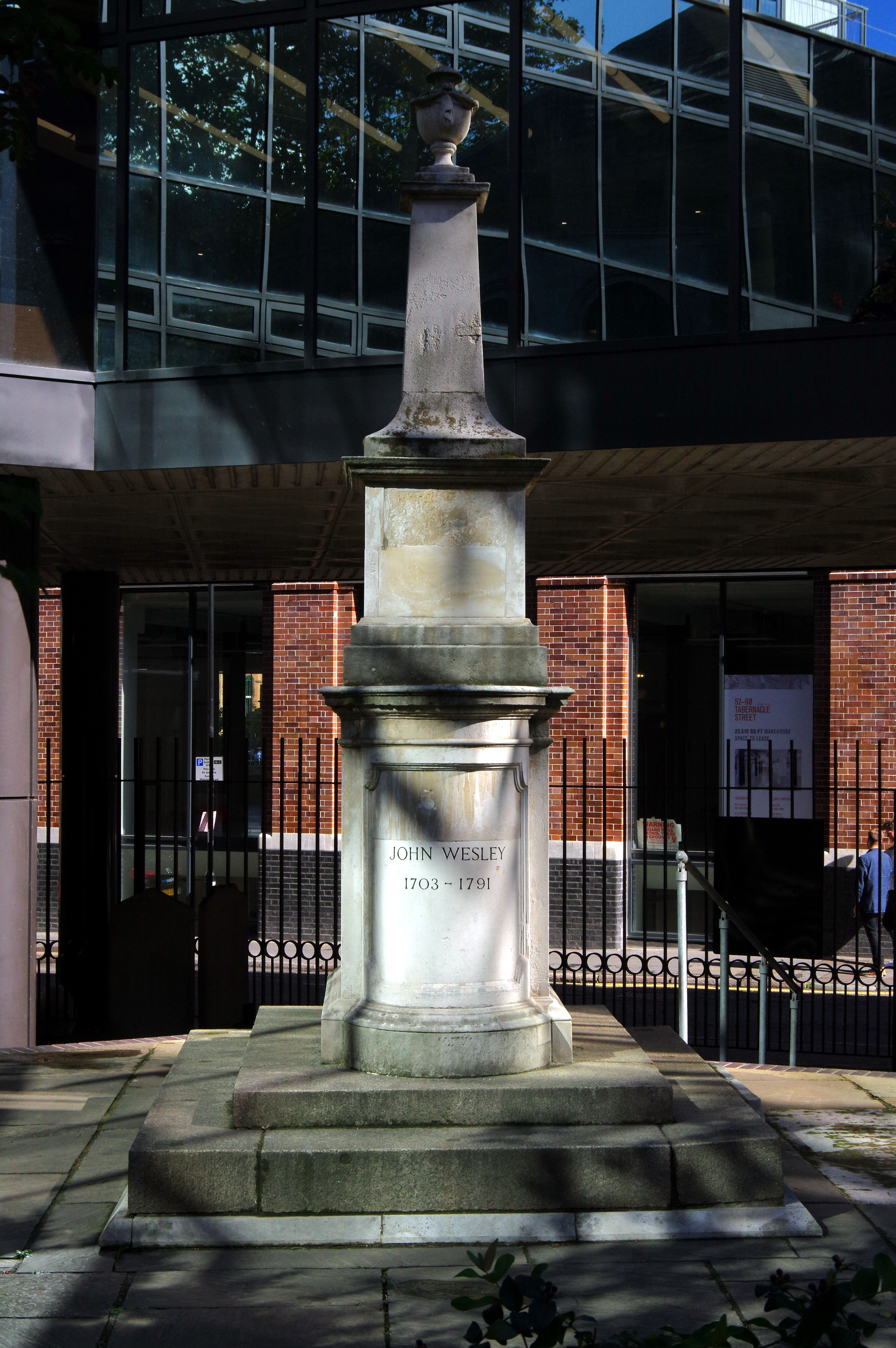
John Wesley's tomb at Wesley's Chapel.

John Wesley was buried at Wesley's Chapel in St Luke's, Central London, United Kingdom.

=== Christian Science ===
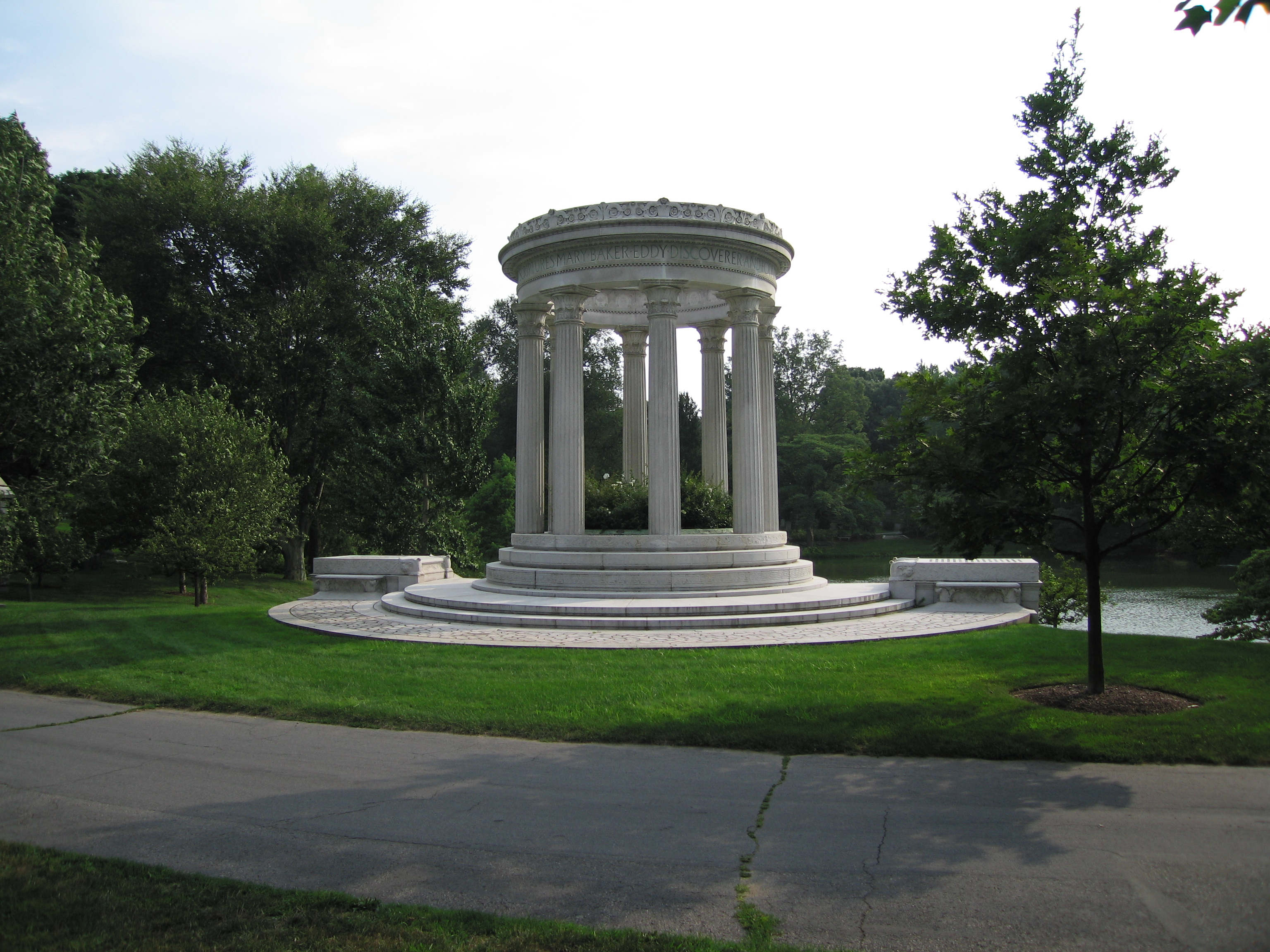
Mary Baker Eddy grave monument

Mary Baker Eddy is buried at Mount Auburn Cemetery in Cambridge, Massachusetts, United States.

=== Seventh-day Adventism ===
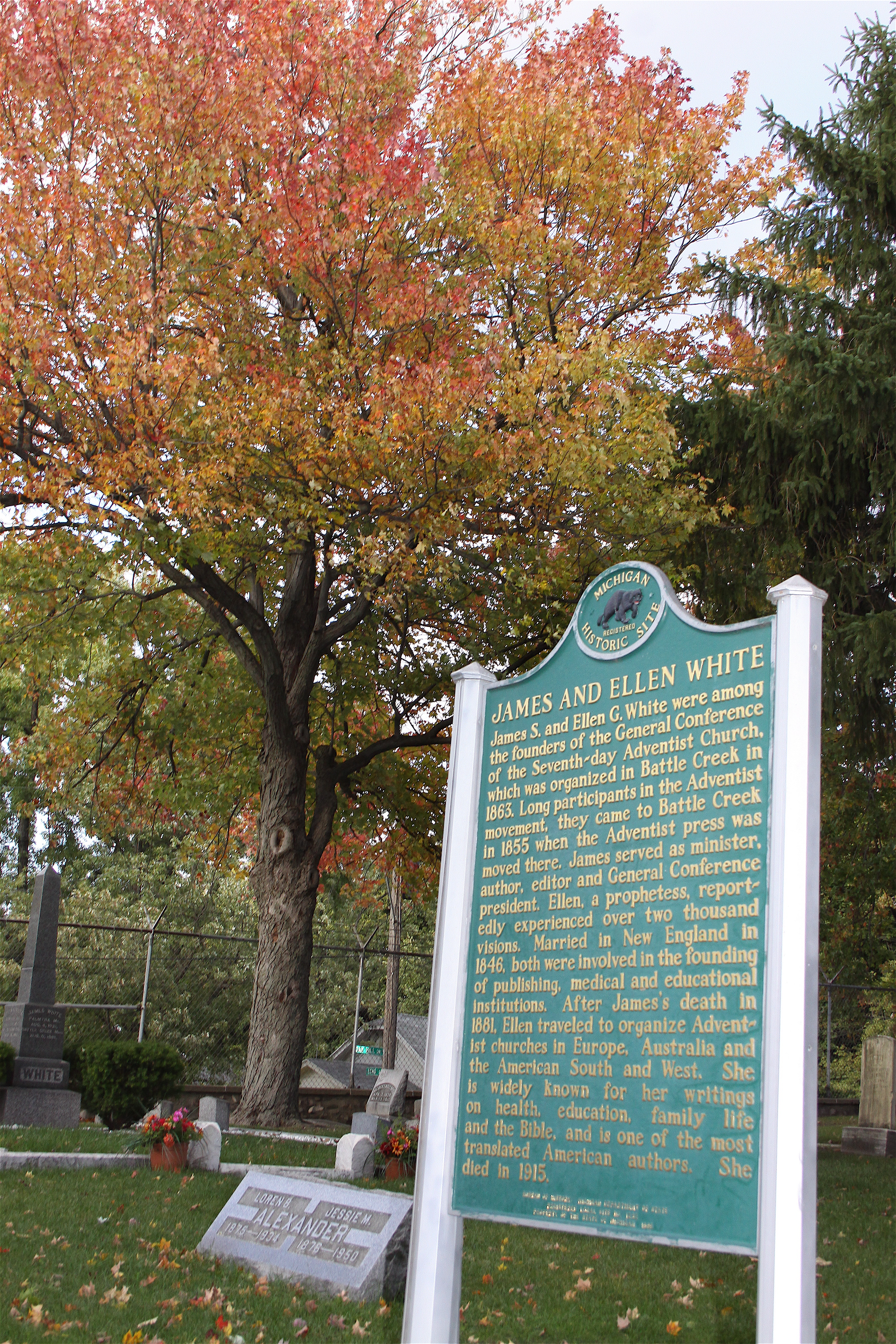
The grave of Ellen G. White and James White at Oak Hill Cemetery.

Ellen G. White and her husband James White were buried at Oak Hill Cemetery, in Battle Creek, Michigan, United States.

=== Jehovahs Witnesses/Bible Students ===
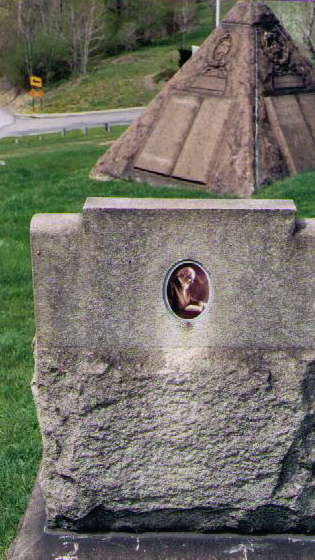
The tombstone of Charles Taze Russell

The tombstone of Charles Taze Russell (1852-1916) is located in Pittsburgh, Pennsylvania, in the United States.

=== Latter Day Saint movement ===
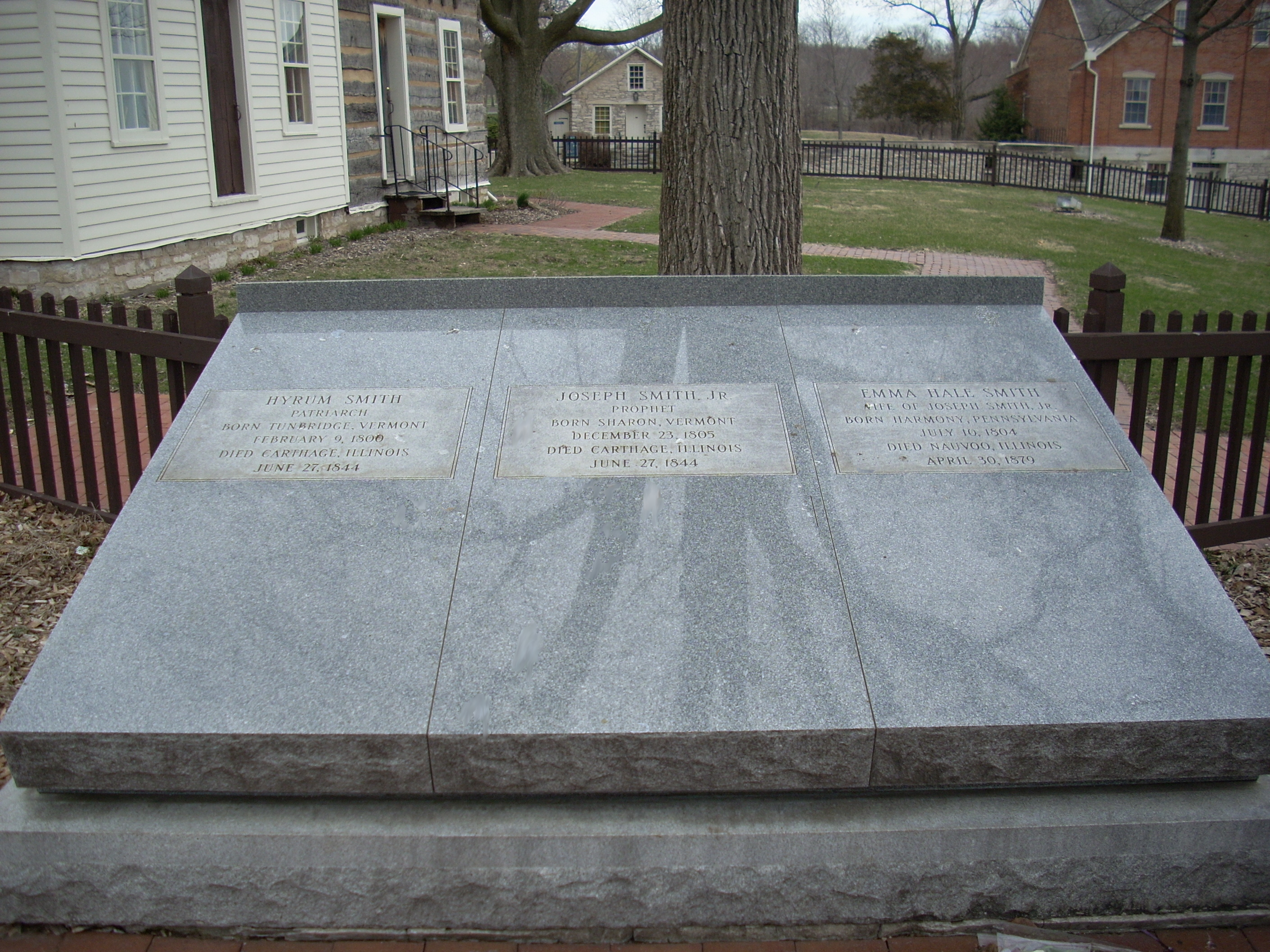
Joseph Smith's grave

Joseph Smith is buried at the Smith Family Cemetery in Nauvoo, Illinois in the United States.

== Spiritism ==
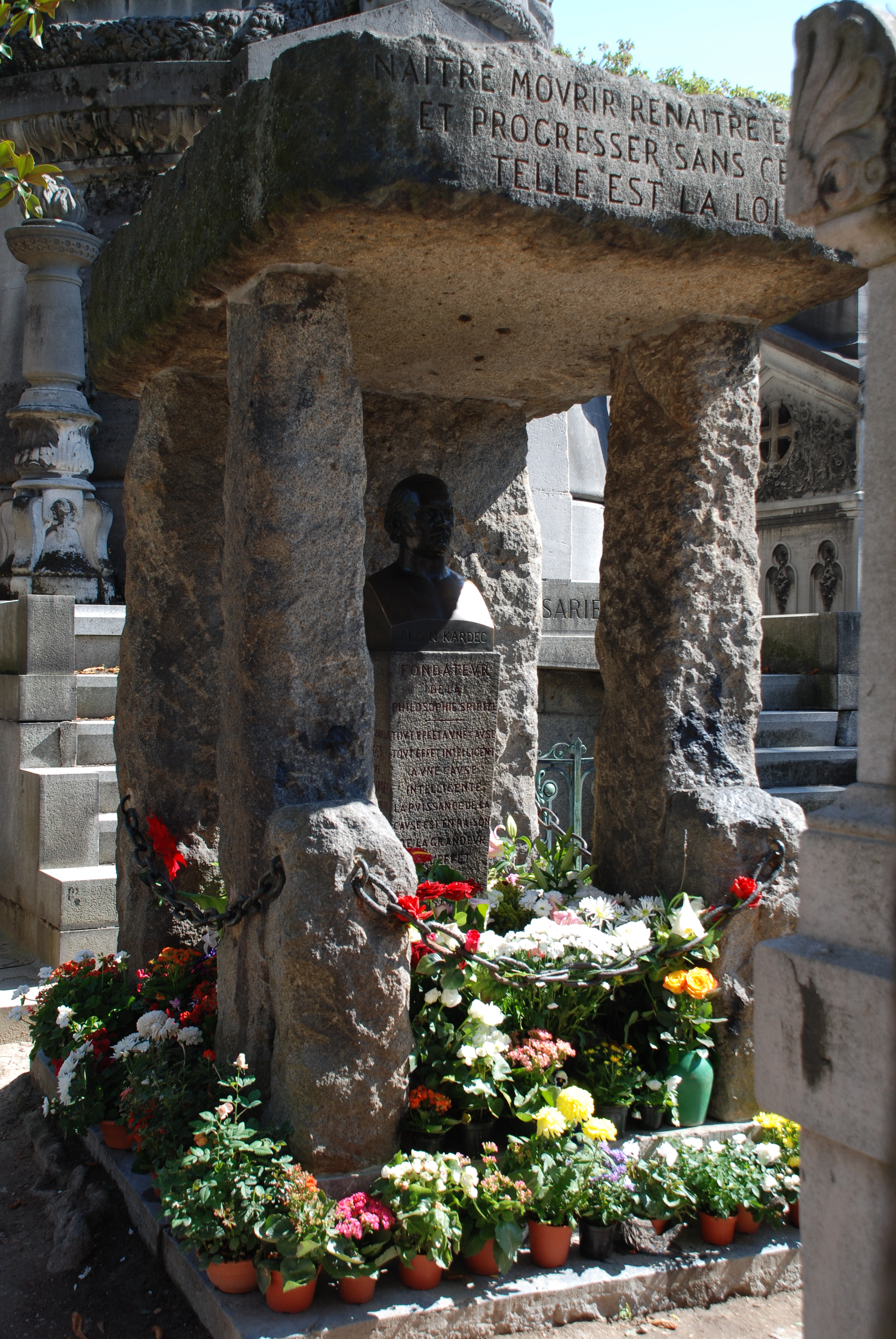
Allan Kardec's grave at Père Lachaise Cemetery in Paris, France. The inscription in French says Naitre, mourir, renaitre encore et progresser sans cesse, telle est la loi ("To be born, to die, to be reborn again and keep progressing, that is the law").

Allan Kardec is buried at Père Lachaise Cemetery, in Paris, France.

== Confucianism ==
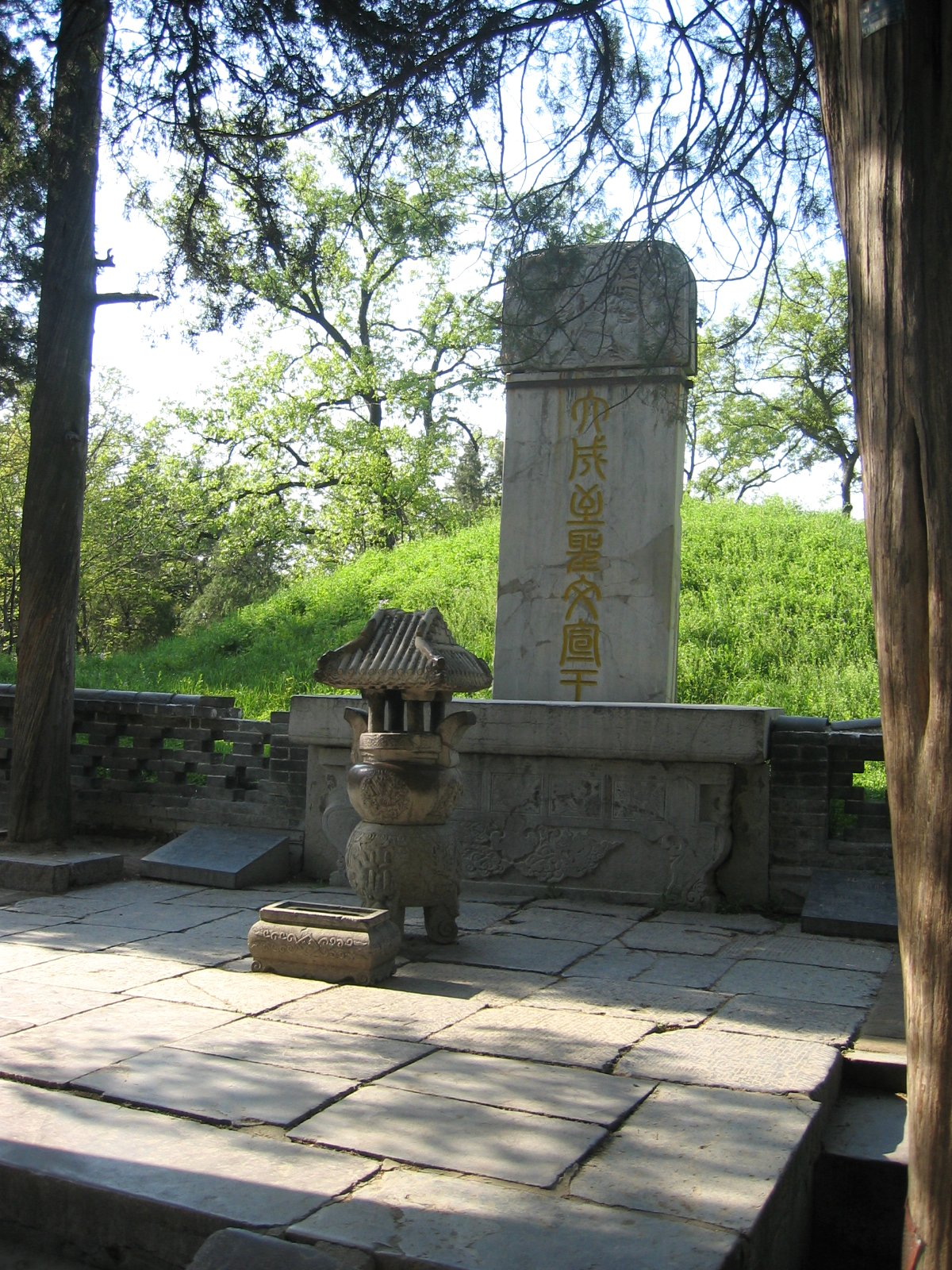
Tomb of Confucius

The grave of Confucius is located in a large cemetery in Qufu, Shandong Province, China where more than 100,000 of his descendants are also buried.

== Islam ==
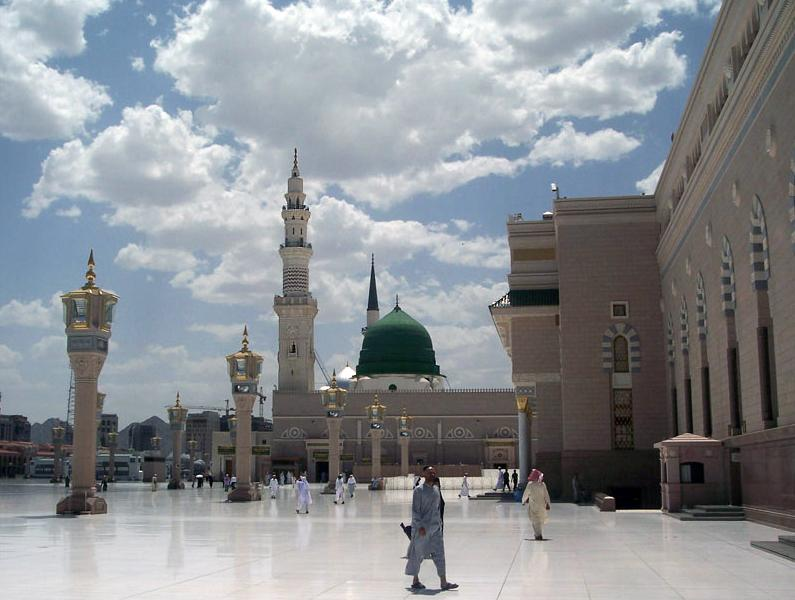
The Green Dome in the Al-Masjid An-Nabawi mosque in Medina, Saudi Arabia

The Green Dome, which houses the tomb of the Islamic prophet Muhammad (who is buried alongside the first two Rashidun Caliphs), is located in the southeast corner of Al-Masjid an-Nabawi ("The Mosque of the Prophet") in Medina, present-day Saudi Arabia. The tomb lays within the confines of the Hujra ("Noble Chamber"), what used to be his and his wife Aisha's house. It only adjoined the mosque until Caliph al-Walid I ordered to incorporate it during the mosque's expansion under his reign.

Traditionally, Islam has had a rich history of the veneration of relics, especially of those attributed to Muhammad. There exists historical evidence that some of the earliest Muslims practised the veneration of relics, and the practice continued to remain popular in many parts of the Sunni Islamic world until the eighteenth-century, when the reform movements of Salafism and Wahhabism began to staunchly condemn such practices due to their linking it with the sin of shirk (idolatry). As a result of the influence of these perspectives, some contemporary Muslims influenced by these ideologies have rejected the traditional practice of relic-veneration altogether. The most genuine prophetic relics are believed to be those housed in Istanbul's Topkapı Palace, in a section known as Hirkai Serif Odasi (Chamber of the Holy Mantle).

The traditional Sunni attitude towards relics is concisely summarized in the words of the fourteenth-century hadith master Al-Dhahabi, who passionately sermonized: "Ahmad ibn Hanbal was asked about touching the Prophet's grave and kissing it and he saw nothing wrong with it. His son 'Abd Allāh related this from him. If it is asked: 'Why did the Prophet's Companions not do this?' We reply: 'Because they saw him with their very eyes when he was alive, enjoyed his presence directly, kissed his very hand, nearly fought each other over the remnants of his ablution water, shared his purified hair on the day of the Greater Pilgrimage, and even if he spat it would virtually not fall except into someone's hand so that he could pass it over his face. Since we have not had the tremendous fortune of sharing this, we throw ourselves on his grave as a mark of commitment, reverence, and acceptance, even to kiss it. Do you not see what Thābit al-Bunānī did when he kissed the hand of Anas ibn Malik and placed it on his face saying: 'This is the hand that touched the hand of the Messenger of God?' Muslims are not moved to these matters except by their extreme love for the Prophet, as they are ordered to love God and the Prophet more than their own lives."

The 17th-century French explorer Jean-Baptiste Tavernier wrote about his discussions with two treasurers of Constantinople, who described the standard, mantle and the seal. Two centuries later, Charles White wrote about the mantle, the standard, the beard, tooth, and footprint of Muhammad, the last of which he saw personally.

== Judaism ==
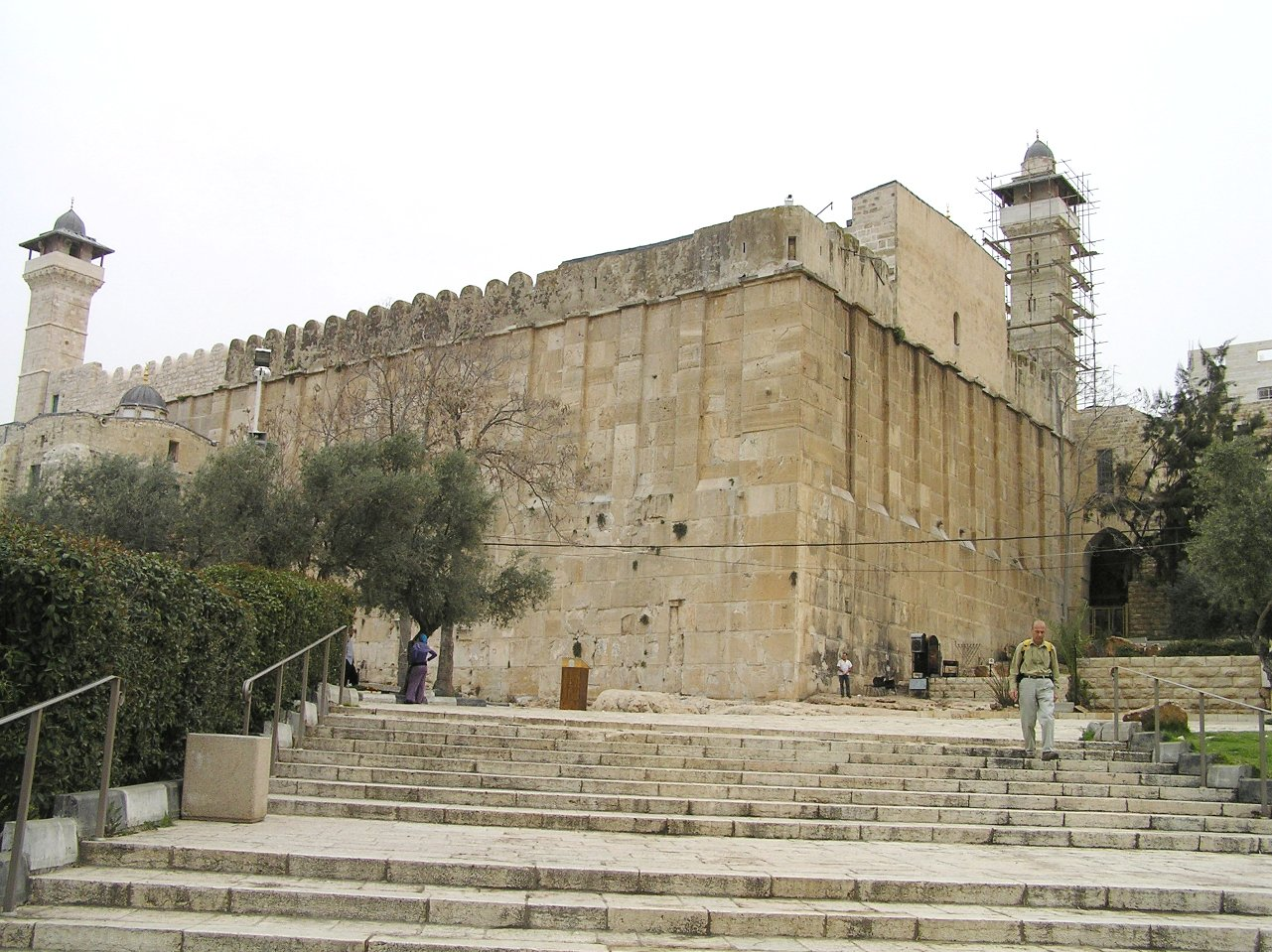
Cave of the Patriarchs

According to Deuteronomy 34:6, the grave of Moses is in a valley across from Mount Peor, near Mount Nebo just east of the Jordan River, now in the kingdom of Jordan.

The Cave of the Patriarchs is located in the ancient city of Hebron. Jewish, Christian, and Islamic tradition holds that the compound encloses the burial place of four biblical couples: Adam and Eve; Abraham and Sarah; Isaac and Rebekah; Jacob and Leah. According to Midrashic sources, it also contains the head of Esau, the brother of Jacob.

Rachel's Tomb, the traditional burial site of the biblical matriarch Rachel, is located outside the Palestinian city of Bethlehem.

== Sikhism ==
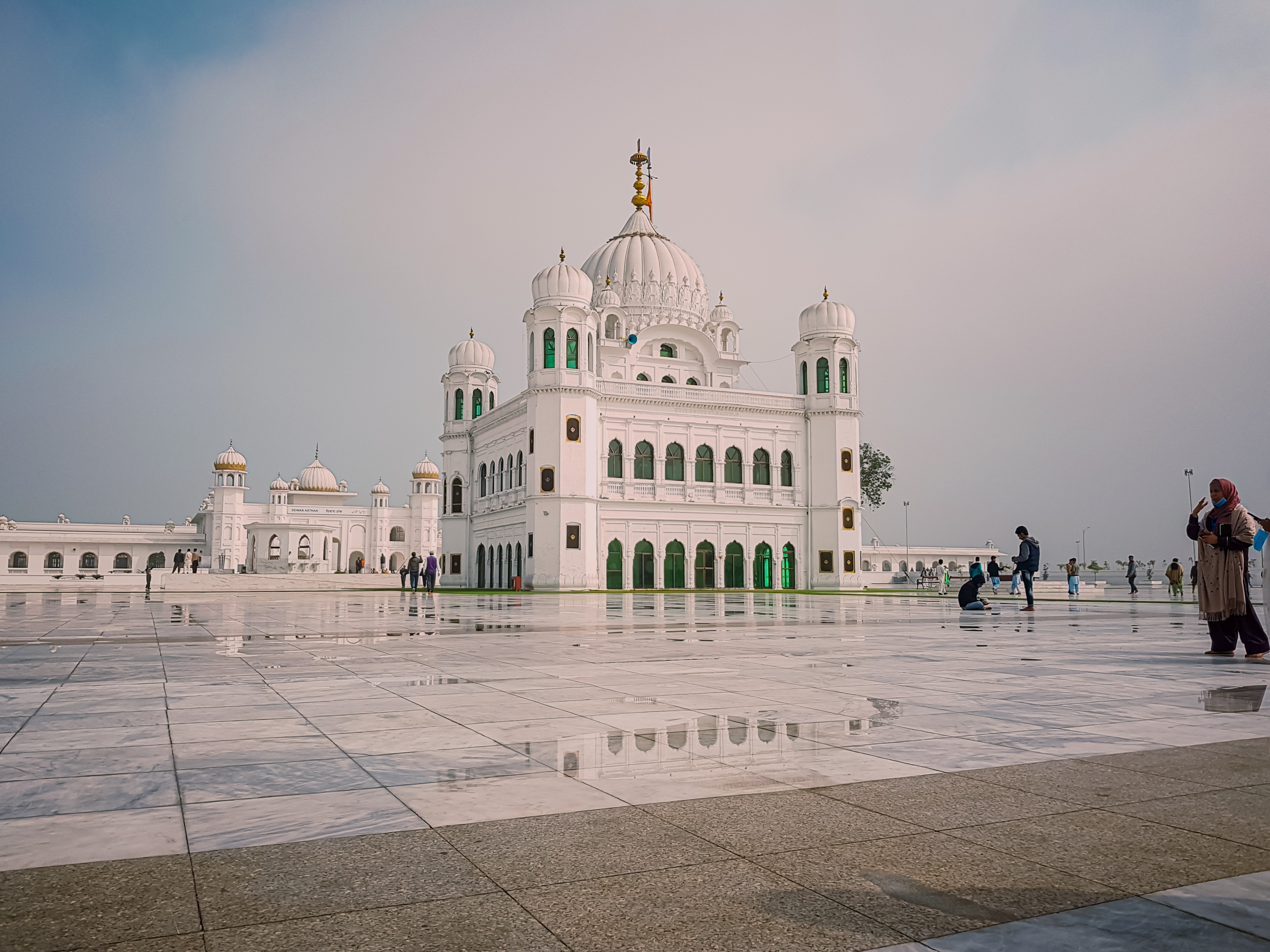
Gurudwara of Guru Nanak in Kartarpur, Pakistan

Gurdwara Kartarpur (meaning "The Abode of God") was established by Guru Nanak, the founder of Sikhism in 1522. A samadhi (according to Hindu tradition) lies in the gurdwara and a grave (according to Abrahamic traditions) lies on the premises as a reminder of this discord. The gurdwara is located in a small village named Kartarpur on the West bank of the Ravi River in Punjab, Pakistan.

== Taoism ==
According to Taoist legend, Laozi transmitted the Tao Te Ching at the request of a border guard before departing from China (i.e. from known civilization). He is believed to have lived out the rest of his days in communion with nature, and some Taoist traditions hold that he achieved immortality. Whether he underwent death or not is not made clear by all parts of the tradition, and if he did, it was in some remote area, far from civilization at that time.

== Tenrikyo ==
Tenrikyo considers the Foundress's Sanctuary at the Tenrikyo Church Headquarters in Tenri, Nara, Japan to be the site where Nakayama Miki "lives and works"; she died in 1887.

== Unification Church ==
Unification Church founder Sun Myung Moon is buried on a mountainside overlooking the CheongShim Peace World Center in Gapyeong, South Korea.

== Zoroastrianism ==
There is no consensus as to where Zoroaster, the founder of Zoroastrianism lived, much less where he died or what became of his remains. Most believe that he died in Balkh while he was praying. When he died, his entire body became a flame. Fire is a very important concept in Zoroastrianism.

== See also ==
- List of burial places of Abrahamic figures
- List of founders of religious traditions
- List of religious sites
- Pilgrimage
- Religious tourism
