= Immortality =

Concept of eternal life

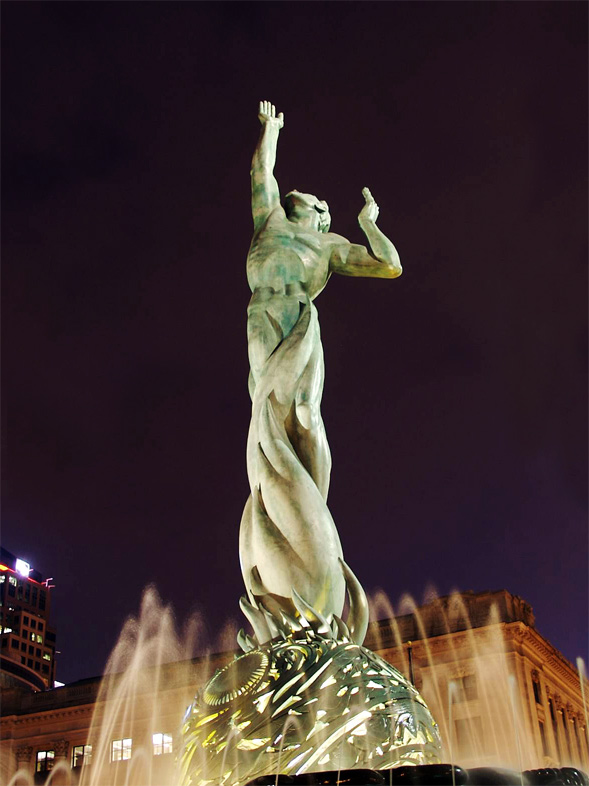
The Fountain of Eternal Life in Cleveland, Ohio, United States, is described as symbolizing "Man rising above death, reaching upward to God and toward Peace."

Immortality is the concept of eternal life and permanent resistance to death from natural causes. Some species possess "biological immortality" due to an apparent lack of the Hayflick limit.

From at least the time of the ancient Mesopotamians, there has been a conviction that gods may be physically immortal, and that this is also a state that the gods at times offer humans. This theory varys wildly in different religions. In Christianity, the conviction that God may offer physical immortality with the resurrection of the flesh at the end of time has traditionally been at the center of its beliefs. What form an unending human life would take, or whether an immaterial soul exists and possesses immortality, has been a major point of focus of religion, as well as the subject of speculation and debate. In religious contexts, immortality is often stated to be one of the promises of divinities to human beings who perform virtue or follow divine law.

Some scientists, futurists, and philosophers have theorized about the immortality of the human body, with some suggesting that human immortality may be achievable in the first few decades of the 21st century with the help of certain speculative technologies such as mind uploading (digital immortality).

== Definitions ==
=== Scientific ===
Life extension technologies claim to be developing a path to complete rejuvenation. Cryonics holds out the hope that the dead can be revived in the future, following sufficient medical advancements. While, as shown with creatures such as hydra and Planarian worms, it is indeed possible for a creature to be biologically immortal, these animals are physiologically very different from humans, and it is not known if something comparable will ever be possible for humans.

=== Religious ===
Immortality in religion refers usually to either the belief in physical immortality or a more spiritual afterlife. The difference between psychical mortality and the afterlife is one of many key informatives for those unaware; psychical mortality suggests the body is incapable of dying, and the afterlife suggests a state of the soul outliving the death of the body. In traditions such as ancient Egyptian beliefs, Mesopotamian beliefs and ancient Greek beliefs, the immortal gods consequently were considered to have physical bodies, whilst still being immortal. In Mesopotamian and Greek religion, the gods also made certain men and women physically immortal, whereas in Christianity, many believe that all true believers will be resurrected to physical immortality. Similar beliefs that physical immortality is possible are held by Rastafarians or Rebirthers.

== Physical immortality ==
Physical immortality is a state of life that allows a person to avoid death and maintain conscious thought. It can mean the unending existence of a person from a physical source other than organic life, such as a computer.

Pursuit of physical immortality before the advent of modern science included alchemists, who sought to create the Philosopher's Stone, and various cultures' legends such as the Fountain of Youth or the Peaches of Immortality inspiring attempts at discovering an elixir of life.

Modern scientific trends, such as cryonics, digital immortality, breakthroughs in rejuvenation, or predictions of an impending technological singularity, to achieve genuine human physical immortality, must still overcome all causes of death to succeed.

=== Causes of death ===
There are three main causes of death: natural aging, disease, and injury. Such issues can be resolved with the solutions provided in research to any end providing such alternate theories at present that require unification.

==== Aging ====
Aubrey de Grey, a leading researcher in the field, defines aging as "a collection of cumulative changes to the molecular and cellular structure of an adult organism, which result in essential metabolic processes, but which also, once they progress far enough, increasingly disrupt metabolism, resulting in pathology and death." The current causes of aging in humans are cell loss (without replacement), DNA damage, oncogenic nuclear mutations and epimutations, cell senescence, mitochondrial mutations, lysosomal aggregates, extracellular aggregates, random extracellular cross-linking, immune system decline, and endocrine changes. Eliminating aging would require finding a solution to each of these causes, a program de Grey calls engineered negligible senescence. There is also a huge body of knowledge indicating that change is characterized by the loss of molecular fidelity.

==== Disease ====
Disease is theoretically surmountable by technology. In short, it is an abnormal condition affecting the body of an organism, something the body should not typically have to deal with its natural make up. Human understanding of genetics is leading to cures and treatments for a myriad of previously incurable diseases. The mechanisms by which other diseases do damage are becoming better understood. Sophisticated methods of detecting diseases early are being developed. Preventative medicine is becoming better understood. Neurodegenerative diseases like Parkinson's and Alzheimer's may soon be curable with the use of stem cells. Breakthroughs in cell biology and telomere research are leading to treatments for cancer. Vaccines are being researched for AIDS and tuberculosis. Genes associated with type 1 diabetes and certain types of cancer have been discovered, allowing for new therapies to be developed. Artificial devices attached directly to the nervous system may restore sight to the blind. Drugs are being developed to treat a myriad of other diseases and ailments.

There has been a push recently to classify aging as a disease.

==== Trauma ====
Physical trauma would remain as a threat to perpetual physical life, as an otherwise immortal person would still be subject to unforeseen accidents or catastrophes. The speed and quality of paramedic response remains a determining factor in surviving severe trauma. A body that could automatically repair itself from severe trauma, such as speculated uses for nanotechnology, would mitigate this factor. The brain cannot be risked to trauma if a continuous physical life is to be maintained. This aversion to trauma risk to the brain would naturally result in significant behavioral changes that would render physical immortality undesirable for some people.

=== Biological immortality ===
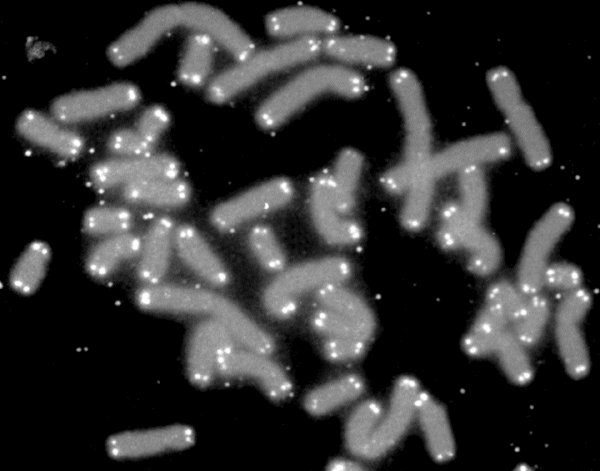
Human chromosomes (grey) capped by telomeres (white)

Biological immortality is an absence of aging. Specifically it is the absence of a sustained increase in rate of mortality as a function of chronological age. A cell or organism that does not experience aging, or ceases to age at some point, is biologically immortal.

Biologists have chosen the word "immortal" to designate cells that are not limited by the Hayflick limit, where cells no longer divide because of DNA damage or shortened telomeres. The first and still most widely used immortal cell line is HeLa, developed from cells taken from the malignant cervical tumor of Henrietta Lacks without her consent in 1951. Prior to the 1961 work of Leonard Hayflick, there was the erroneous belief fostered by Alexis Carrel that all normal somatic cells are immortal. By preventing cells from reaching senescence one can achieve biological immortality; telomeres, a "cap" at the end of DNA, are thought to be the cause of cell aging. Every time a cell divides the telomere becomes a bit shorter; when it is finally worn down, the cell is unable to split and dies. Telomerase is an enzyme which rebuilds the telomeres in stem cells and cancer cells, allowing them to replicate an infinite number of times. No definitive work has yet demonstrated that telomerase can be used in human somatic cells to prevent healthy tissues from aging. On the other hand, scientists hope to be able to grow organs with the help of stem cells, allowing organ transplants without the risk of rejection, another step in extending human life expectancy. These technologies are the subject of ongoing research, and are not yet realized.

==== Biologically immortal species ====
Life defined as biologically immortal is still susceptible to causes of death besides aging, including disease and trauma, as defined above. Notable immortal species include:

- Bacteria – Bacteria reproduce through binary fission. A parent bacterium splits itself into two identical daughter cells which eventually then split themselves in half. This process repeats, thus making the bacterium essentially immortal. A 2005 PLoS Biology paper suggests that after each division the daughter cells can be identified as the older and the younger, and the older is slightly smaller, weaker, and more likely to die than the younger.
- Turritopsis dohrnii, a jellyfish (phylum Cnidaria, class Hydrozoa, order Anthoathecata), after becoming a sexually mature adult, can transform itself back into a polyp using the cell conversion process of transdifferentiation. Turritopsis dohrnii repeats this cycle, meaning that it may have an indefinite lifespan. Its immortal adaptation has allowed it to spread from its original habitat in the Caribbean to "all over the world".
- Hydra is a genus belonging to the phylum Cnidaria, the class Hydrozoa and the order Anthomedusae. They are simple fresh-water predatory animals possessing radial symmetry.

==== Evolution of aging ====
As the existence of biologically immortal species demonstrates, there is no thermodynamic necessity for senescence: a defining feature of life is that it takes in free energy from the environment and unloads its entropy as waste. Living systems can even build themselves up from seed, and routinely repair themselves. Aging is therefore presumed to be a byproduct of evolution, but why mortality should be selected for remains a subject of research and debate. Programmed cell death and the telomere "end replication problem" are found even in the earliest and simplest of organisms. This may be a tradeoff between selecting for cancer and selecting for aging.

Modern theories on the evolution of aging include the following:

- Mutation accumulation is a theory formulated by Peter Medawar in 1952 to explain how evolution would select for aging. Essentially, aging is never selected against, as organisms have offspring before the mortal mutations surface in an individual.
- Antagonistic pleiotropy is a theory proposed as an alternative by George C. Williams, a critic of Medawar, in 1957. In antagonistic pleiotropy, genes carry effects that are both beneficial and detrimental. In essence this refers to genes that offer benefits early in life, but exact a cost later on, i.e. decline and death.
- The disposable soma theory was proposed in 1977 by Thomas Kirkwood, which states that an individual body must allocate energy for metabolism, reproduction, and maintenance, and must compromise when there is food scarcity. Compromise in allocating energy to the repair function is what causes the body gradually to deteriorate with age, according to Kirkwood.

==== Immortality of the germline ====
Individual organisms ordinarily age and die, while the germlines which connect successive generations are potentially immortal. The basis for this difference is a fundamental problem in biology. The Russian biologist and historian Zhores A. Medvedev considered that the accuracy of genome replicative and other synthetic systems alone cannot explain the immortality of germlines. Rather Medvedev thought that known features of the biochemistry and genetics of sexual reproduction indicate the presence of unique information maintenance and restoration processes at the different stages of gametogenesis. In particular, Medvedev considered that the most important opportunities for information maintenance of germ cells are created by recombination during meiosis and DNA repair; he saw these as processes within the germ cells that were capable of restoring the integrity of DNA and chromosomes from the types of damage that cause irreversible aging in somatic cells.

=== Prospects for human biological immortality ===
==== Life-extending substances ====
Some scientists believe that boosting the amount or proportion of telomerase in the body, a naturally forming enzyme that helps maintain the protective caps at the ends of chromosomes, could prevent cells from dying and so may ultimately lead to extended, healthier lifespans. A team of researchers at the Spanish National Cancer Centre (Madrid) tested the hypothesis on mice. It was found that those mice which were "genetically engineered to produce 10 times the normal levels of telomerase lived 50% longer than normal mice".

In normal circumstances, without the presence of telomerase, if a cell divides repeatedly, at some point all the progeny will reach their Hayflick limit. With the presence of telomerase, each dividing cell can replace the lost bit of DNA, and any single cell can then divide unbounded. While this unbounded growth property has excited many researchers, caution is warranted in exploiting this property, as exactly this same unbounded growth is a crucial step in enabling cancerous growth. If an organism can replicate its body cells faster, then it would theoretically stop aging.

Embryonic stem cells express telomerase, which allows them to divide repeatedly and form the individual. In adults, telomerase is highly expressed in cells that need to divide regularly (e.g., in the immune system), whereas most somatic cells express it only at very low levels in a cell-cycle dependent manner.

==== Technological immortality, biological machines, and "swallowing the doctor" ====
Technological immortality may be possible by scientific advances in a variety of fields: nanotechnology, emergency room procedures, genetics, biological engineering, regenerative medicine, microbiology, etc. Contemporary life spans in the advanced industrial societies are already markedly longer than those of the past because of better nutrition, availability of health care, standard of living and bio-medical scientific advances. Technological immortality predicts further progress for the same reasons over the near term. An important aspect of current scientific thinking about immortality is that some combination of human cloning, cryonics or nanotechnology will play an essential role in extreme life extension. Robert Freitas, a nanorobotics theorist, suggests tiny medical nanorobots could be created to go through human bloodstreams, find dangerous things like cancer cells and bacteria, and destroy them. Freitas anticipates that gene-therapies and nanotechnology will eventually make the human body effectively self-sustainable and capable of living indefinitely in empty space, short of severe brain trauma. This supports the theory that we will be able to continually create biological or synthetic replacement parts to replace damaged or dying ones. Future advances in nanomedicine could give rise to life extension through the repair of many processes thought to be responsible for aging. K. Eric Drexler, one of the founders of nanotechnology, postulated cell repair devices, including ones operating within cells and using as yet hypothetical biological machines, in his 1986 book Engines of Creation. Raymond Kurzweil, a futurist and transhumanist, stated in his book The Singularity Is Near that he believes that advanced medical nanorobotics could completely remedy the effects of aging by 2030. According to Richard Feynman, it was his former graduate student and collaborator Albert Hibbs who originally suggested to him (circa 1959) the idea of a medical use for Feynman's theoretical micromachines (see biological machine). Hibbs suggested that certain repair machines might one day be reduced in size to the point that it would, in theory, be possible to (as Feynman put it) "swallow the doctor". The idea was incorporated into Feynman's 1959 essay There's Plenty of Room at the Bottom.

==== Cryonics ====
Cryonics, the practice of preserving organisms (either intact specimens or only their brains) for possible future revival by storing them at cryogenic temperatures where metabolism and decay are almost completely stopped, can be used to 'pause' for those who believe that life extension technologies will not develop sufficiently within their lifetime. Ideally, cryonics would allow clinically dead people to be brought back in the future after cures to the patients' diseases have been discovered and aging is reversible. Modern cryonics procedures use a process called vitrification which creates a glass-like state rather than freezing as the body is brought to low temperatures. This process reduces the risk of ice crystals damaging the cell-structure, which would be especially detrimental to cell structures in the brain, as their minute adjustment evokes the individual's mind.

==== Mind-to-computer uploading ====
One idea that has been advanced involves uploading an individual's habits and memories via direct mind-computer interface. The individual's memory may be loaded to a computer or to a new organic body. Extropian futurists like Moravec and Kurzweil have proposed that, thanks to exponentially growing computing power, it will someday be possible to upload human consciousness onto a computer system, and exist indefinitely in a virtual environment.

This could be accomplished via advanced cybernetics, where computer hardware would initially be installed in the brain to help sort memory or accelerate thought processes. Components would be added gradually until the person's entire brain functions were handled by artificial devices, avoiding sharp transitions that would lead to issues of identity, thus running the risk of the person to be declared dead and thus not be a legitimate owner of his or her property. After this point, the human body could be treated as an optional accessory and the program implementing the person could be transferred to any sufficiently powerful computer.

Another possible mechanism for mind upload is to perform a detailed scan of an individual's original, organic brain and simulate the entire structure in a computer. What level of detail such scans and simulations would need to achieve to emulate awareness, and whether the scanning process would destroy the brain, is still to be determined. (Note: The basic idea is to take a particular brain, scan its structure in detail, and construct a software model of it that is so faithful to the original that, when run on appropriate hardware, it will behave in essentially the same way as the original brain. — Sandberg & Boström (2008))

It is suggested that achieving immortality through this mechanism would require specific consideration to be given to the role of consciousness in the functions of the mind. An uploaded mind would only be a copy of the original mind, and not the conscious mind of the living entity associated in such a transfer. Without a simultaneous upload of consciousness, the original living entity remains mortal, thus not achieving true immortality. Research on neural correlates of consciousness is yet inconclusive on this issue. Whatever the route to mind upload, persons in this state could then be considered essentially immortal, short of loss or traumatic destruction of the machines that maintained them.

==== Cybernetics ====
Transforming a human into a cyborg can include brain implants or extracting a human processing unit and placing it in a robotic life-support system. Even replacing biological organs with robotic ones could increase life span (e.g., pacemakers), and depending on the definition, many technological upgrades to the body, like genetic modifications or the addition of nanobots, would qualify an individual as a cyborg. Some people believe that such modifications would make one impervious to aging and disease and theoretically immortal unless killed or destroyed.

== Religious views ==
As late as 1952, the editorial staff of the Syntopicon found in their compilation of the Great Books of the Western World, that "The philosophical issue concerning immortality cannot be separated from issues concerning the existence and nature of man's soul." Thus, the vast majority of speculation on immortality before the 21st century was regarding the nature of the afterlife.

=== Abrahamic religion ===
The viewpoints of Christianity, Islam, and Judaism regarding the concept of immortality diverge as each faith system encapsulates unique theological interpretations and doctrines on the enduring human nature soul or spirit.

==== Christianity ====
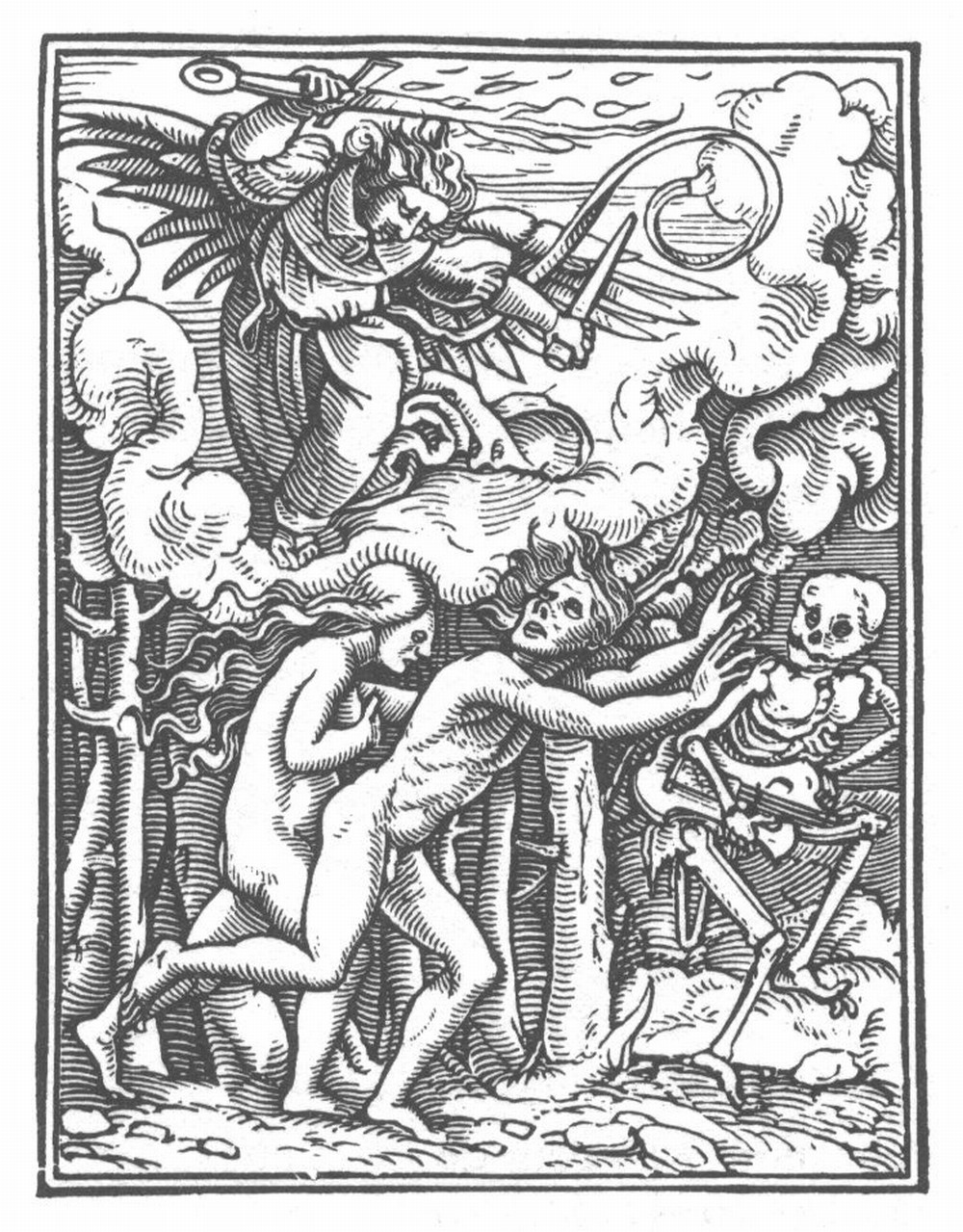
Adam and Eve condemned to mortality. Hans Holbein the Younger, Danse Macabre, 16th century

Christian theology holds that Adam and Eve lost physical immortality for themselves and all their descendants through the Fall, although this initial "imperishability of the bodily frame of man" was "a preternatural condition".

Christians who profess the Nicene Creed believe that every dead person (whether they believed in Christ or not) will be resurrected from the dead at the Second Coming; this belief is known as universal resurrection. Paul the Apostle, in following his past life as a Pharisee (a Jewish social movement that held to a future physical resurrection), proclaims an amalgamated view of resurrected believers where both the physical and the spiritual are rebuilt in the likeness of post-resurrection Christ, who "will transform our lowly body to be like his glorious body" (ESV). This thought mirrors Paul's depiction of believers having been "buried therefore with him [that is, Christ] by baptism into death" (ESV).

N.T. Wright, a theologian and former Bishop of Durham, has said many people forget the physical aspect of what Jesus promised. He told Time: "Jesus' resurrection marks the beginning of a restoration that he will complete upon his return. Part of this will be the resurrection of all the dead, who will 'awake', be embodied and participate in the renewal. Wright says John Polkinghorne, a physicist and a priest, has put it this way: 'God will download our software onto his hardware until the time he gives us new hardware to run the software again for ourselves.' That gets to two things nicely: that the period after death (the Intermediate state) is a period when we are in God's presence but not active in our own bodies, and also that the more important transformation will be when we are again embodied and administering Christ's kingdom." This kingdom will consist of Heaven and Earth "joined together in a new creation", he said.

Christian apocrypha include immortal human figures such as Cartaphilus who were cursed with physical immortality for various transgressions against Christ during the Passion. The medieval Waldensians believed in the immortality of the soul. Leaders of sects such as John Asgill and John Wroe taught followers that physical immortality was possible.

Many Patristic writers have connected the immortal rational soul to the image of God found in Genesis 1:26. Among them is Athanasius of Alexandria and Clement of Alexandria, who say that the immortal rational soul itself is the image of God. Even Early Christian Liturgies exhibit this connection between the immortal rational soul and the creation of humanity in the image of God.

==== Islam ====
"Every soul will taste death, and you will receive your full reward on the Judgement Day." Al-Imran (3:185)

Islamic beliefs include the concept of spiritual immortality. Following death, Islam teaches that a person will be judged consistent with their beliefs and actions and will embark unto their everlasting place. The righteous go to Jannah and others go to hell. However, not all Muslims and scholars agree whether hell is eternal or whether all of the condemned will eventually be forgiven and allowed to enter paradise.

But give glad tidings to those who believe and work righteousness, that their portion is gardens, beneath which rivers flow. Every time they are fed with fruits therefrom, they say, 'Why, this is what we were fed with before,' for they are given things in similitude; and they have therein companions pure (and holy); and they abide therein forever.

— Al-Baqarah (2:25)

Angels in Islam are reckoned as immortals from the perspective of Islam but most people believe that the angels will die and that the Angel of Death will die, but there is no clear text concerning this. Rather there are texts which may this Alternatively, Jinn have a long lifespan between 1000 and 1500. Khidr, a prominent figure in Sufism is given immortality but an exception. Jesus in Islam was summoned to the sky by Allah's sanction to preserve him from the cross and endow him with long life until the advent of the Dajjal. Dajjal is, additionally, given a long life. Jesus Christ dispatches the Dajjal as he stays after 40 days, one like a year, one like a month, one like a week, and the rest of his days like normal days. The Qur'an states that it is the ultimate fate of all life, including humans, to die eventually.

==== Judaism ====
The traditional concept of an immaterial and immortal soul distinct from the body was not found in Judaism before the Babylonian exile, but developed as a result of interaction with Persian and Hellenistic philosophies. Accordingly, the Hebrew word nephesh, although translated as 'soul' in some older English-language Bibles, actually has a meaning closer to "living being". Nephesh was rendered in the Septuagint as ψυχή (psūchê), the Greek word for 'soul'.

The only Hebrew word traditionally translated 'soul' (that is nephesh) in English language Bibles refers to a living, breathing conscious body, rather than to an immortal soul. (Note: "Even as we are conscious of the broad and very common biblical usage of the term "soul", we must be clear that scripture does not present even a rudimentarily developed theology of the soul. The creation narrative is clear that all life originates with God. Yet the Hebrew scripture offers no specific understanding of the origin of individual souls, of when and how they become attached to specific bodies, or of their potential existence, apart from the body, after death. The reason for this is that, as we noted at the beginning, the Hebrew Bible does not present a theory of the soul developed much beyond the simple concept of a force associated with respiration, hence, a life-force.") In the New Testament, the Greek word traditionally translated 'soul' (that is ψυχή) has substantially the same meaning as the Hebrew, without reference to an immortal soul. (Note: In the New Testament, "soul" (orig. ψυχή ) retains its basic Hebrew sense of meaning. "Soul" refers to one's life: Herod sought Jesus' soul (Matt. 2:20); one might save a soul or take it (Mark 3:4); death occurs when God "requires your soul" (Luke 12:20).) 'Soul' may refer either to the whole person, the self, as in "three thousand souls" were converted in Acts 2:41 (see Acts 3:23).

The Hebrew Bible speaks about Sheol (that is שאול), originally a synonym of the grave – the repository of the dead or the cessation of existence, until the resurrection of the dead. This doctrine of resurrection is mentioned explicitly only in Daniel 12:1–4 although it may be implied in several other texts. New theories arose concerning Sheol during the intertestamental period.

The views about immortality in Judaism is perhaps best exemplified by the various references to this in Second Temple period. The concept of resurrection of the physical body is found in 2 Maccabees, according to which it will happen through recreation of the flesh. Resurrection of the dead is specified in detail in the extra-canonical books of Enoch, and in Apocalypse of Baruch. According to the British scholar in ancient Judaism P.R. Davies, there is "little or no clear reference ... either to immortality or to resurrection from the dead" in the Dead Sea scrolls texts. Both Josephus and the New Testament record that the Sadducees did not believe in an afterlife, but the sources vary on the beliefs of the Pharisees. The New Testament claims that the Pharisees believed in the resurrection, but does not specify whether this included the flesh or not. According to Josephus, who himself was a Pharisee, the Pharisees held that only the soul was immortal and the souls of good people will be reincarnated and "pass into other bodies", while "the souls of the wicked will suffer eternal punishment." The Book of Jubilees seems to refer to the resurrection of the soul only, or to a more general idea of an immortal soul.

Rabbinic Judaism believes that the righteous dead will be resurrected in the Messianic Age, with the coming of the messiah. They will then be granted immortality in a perfect world. The wicked dead, on the other hand, will not be resurrected at all. This is not the only Jewish belief about the afterlife. The Tanakh is not specific about the afterlife, so there are wide differences in views and explanations among believers.

=== Indian religions ===
The perspectives on immortality within Hinduism and Buddhism exhibit nuanced differences, with each spiritual tradition offering distinctive theological interpretations and doctrines concerning the eternal essence of the human soul or consciousness.

==== Hinduism ====
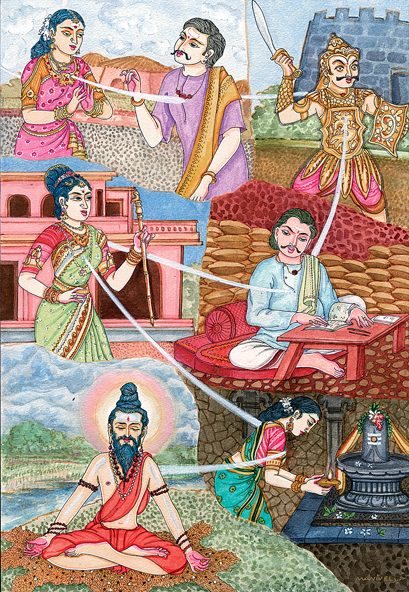
Representation of a soul undergoing punarjanma. Illustration from Hinduism Today, 2004

Hindus believe in an immortal soul which is reincarnated after death. According to Hinduism, people repeat a process of life, death, and rebirth in a cycle called samsara. If they live their life well, their karma improves and their station in the next life will be higher, and conversely lower if they live their life poorly. After many life times of perfecting its karma, the soul is freed from the cycle and lives in perpetual bliss. There is no place of eternal torment in Hinduism, although if a soul consistently lives very evil lives, it could work its way down to the very bottom of the cycle.

There are explicit renderings in the Upanishads alluding to a physically immortal state brought about by purification, and sublimation of the 5 elements that make up the body. For example, in the Shvetashvatara Upanishad (Chapter 2, Verse 12), it is stated "When earth, water, fire, air and sky arise, that is to say, when the five attributes of the elements, mentioned in the books on yoga, become manifest then the yogi's body becomes purified by the fire of yoga and he is free from illness, old age and death."

Another view of immortality is traced to the Vedic tradition by the interpretation of Maharishi Mahesh Yogi:

That man indeed whom these (contacts)
do not disturb, who is even-minded in
pleasure and pain, steadfast, he is fit
for immortality, O best of men.

To Maharishi Mahesh Yogi, the verse means, "Once a man has become established in the understanding of the permanent reality of life, his mind rises above the influence of pleasure and pain. Such an unshakable man passes beyond the influence of death and in the permanent phase of life: he attains eternal life... A man established in the understanding of the unlimited abundance of absolute existence is naturally free from existence of the relative order. This is what gives him the status of immortal life."

An Indian Tamil saint known as Vallalar claimed to have achieved immortality before disappearing forever from a locked room in 1874.

==== Buddhism ====
One of the three marks of existence in Buddhism is anattā, 'non-self'.in sanskrit, anattā is used by the Hindus for soul, because Buddhism is a distinct religion of Hinduism.

This teaching states that the body does not have an eternal soul but is composed of five skandhas or aggregates. Additionally, another mark of existence is impermanence, also called anicca, which runs directly counter to concepts of immortality or permanence. According to one Tibetan Buddhist teaching, Dzogchen, individuals can transform the physical body into an immortal body of light called the rainbow body.

=== Ancient religions ===
==== Ancient Greek religion ====
Immortality in ancient Greek religion originally always included an eternal union of body and soul as can be seen in Homer, Hesiod, and various other ancient texts. The soul was considered to have an eternal existence in Hades, but without the body the soul was considered dead. Although almost everybody had nothing to look forward to but an eternal existence as a disembodied dead soul, a number of men and women were considered to have gained physical immortality and been brought to live forever in either Elysium, the Islands of the Blessed, heaven, the ocean or literally right under the ground. Among those humans made immortal were Amphiaraus, Ganymede, Ino, Iphigenia, Menelaus, Peleus, and a great number of those who fought in the Trojan and Theban wars. Asclepius was killed by Zeus, and by Apollo's request, was subsequently immortalized as a star.

In ancient Greek religion a number of men and women have been interpreted as being resurrected and made immortal. Achilles, after being killed, was snatched from his funeral pyre by his divine mother Thetis and brought to an immortal existence in either Leuce, the Elysian plains or the Islands of the Blessed. Memnon, who was killed by Achilles, seems to have received a similar fate. Alcmene, Castor, Heracles, and Melicertes, are also among the figures interpreted to have been resurrected to physical immortality. According to Herodotus's Histories, the seventh century BC sage Aristeas of Proconnesus was first found dead, after which his body disappeared from a locked room. He would reappear alive years later. However, Greek attitudes towards resurrection were generally negative, and the idea of resurrection was considered neither desirable nor possible. For example, Asclepius was killed by Zeus for using herbs to resurrect the dead, but by his father Apollo's request, was subsequently immortalized as a star.

Writing his Lives of Illustrious Men (Parallel Lives) in the first century, the Middle Platonic philosopher Plutarch in his chapter on Romulus gave an account of the king's mysterious disappearance and subsequent deification, comparing it to Greek tales such as the physical immortalization of Alcmene and Aristeas the Proconnesian, "for they say Aristeas died in a fuller's work-shop, and his friends coming to look for him, found his body vanished; and that some presently after, coming from abroad, said they met him traveling towards Croton". Plutarch openly scorned such beliefs held in ancient Greek religion, writing, "many such improbabilities do your fabulous writers relate, deifying creatures naturally mortal." Likewise, he writes that while something within humans comes from the gods and returns to them after death, this happens "only when it is most completely separated and set free from the body, and becomes altogether pure, fleshless, and undefiled."

The parallel between these traditional beliefs and the later belief in the resurrection of Jesus was not lost on early Christians, as Justin Martyr argued:

"when we say ... Jesus Christ, our teacher, was crucified and died, and rose again, and ascended into heaven, we propose nothing different from what you believe regarding those whom you consider sons of Zeus."

The philosophical idea of an immortal soul was a belief first appearing with either Pherecydes or the Orphics, and most importantly advocated by Plato and his followers. This, however, never became the general norm in Hellenistic thought. As may be witnessed even into the Christian era, not least by the complaints of various philosophers over popular beliefs, many or perhaps most traditional Greeks maintained the conviction that certain individuals were resurrected from the dead and made physically immortal and that others could only look forward to an existence as disembodied and dead, though everlasting, souls.

==== Zoroastrianism ====
Zoroastrians believe that on the fourth day after death, the human soul leaves the body and the body remains as an empty shell. Souls would go to either heaven or hell; these concepts of the afterlife in Zoroastrianism may have influenced Abrahamic religions. The Persian word for "immortal" is associated with the month "Amurdad", meaning "deathless" in Persian, in the Iranian calendar (near the end of July). The month of Amurdad or Ameretat is celebrated in Persian culture as ancient Persians believed the "Angel of Immortality" won over the "Angel of Death" in this month.

=== Philosophical religions ===
==== Taoism ====
It is repeatedly stated in the Lüshi Chunqiu that death is unavoidable. Henri Maspero noted that many scholarly works frame Taoism as a school of thought focused on the quest for immortality. Isabelle Robinet asserts that Taoism is better understood as a way of life than as a religion, and that its adherents do not approach or view Taoism the way non-Taoist historians have done. In the Tractate of Actions and their Retributions, a traditional teaching, spiritual immortality can be rewarded to people who do a certain amount of good deeds and live a simple, pure life. A list of good deeds and sins are tallied to determine whether or not a mortal is worthy. Spiritual immortality in this definition allows the soul to leave the earthly realms of afterlife and go to pure realms in the Taoist cosmology.

== Philosophical arguments for the immortality of the soul ==
=== Alcmaeon of Croton ===
Alcmaeon of Croton argued that the soul is continuously and ceaselessly in motion. The exact form of his argument is unclear, but it appears to have influenced Plato, Aristotle, and other later writers.

=== Plato ===
Plato's Phaedo advances four arguments for the soul's immortality:

- The Cyclical Argument, or Opposites Argument explains that Forms are eternal and unchanging, and as the soul always brings life, then it must not die, and is necessarily "imperishable". As the body is mortal and is subject to physical death, the soul must be its indestructible opposite. Plato then suggests the analogy of fire and cold. If the form of cold is imperishable, and fire, its opposite, was within close proximity, it would have to withdraw intact as does the soul during death. This could be likened to the idea of the opposite charges of magnets.
- The Theory of Recollection explains that we possess some non-empirical knowledge (e.g. The Form of Equality) at birth, implying the soul existed before birth to carry that knowledge. Another account of the theory is found in Plato's Meno, although in that case Socrates implies anamnesis (previous knowledge of everything) whereas he is not so bold in Phaedo.
- The Affinity Argument, explains that invisible, immortal, and incorporeal things are different from visible, mortal, and corporeal things. Our soul is of the former, while our body is of the latter, so when our bodies die and decay, our soul will continue to live.
- The Argument from Form of Life or The Final Argument explains that the Forms, incorporeal and static entities, are the cause of all things in the world, and all things participate in Forms. For example, beautiful things participate in the Form of Beauty; the number four participates in the Form of the Even, etc. The soul, by its very nature, participates in the Form of Life, which means the soul can never die.

=== Plotinus ===
Plotinus offers a version of the argument that Kant calls "The Achilles of Rationalist Psychology". Plotinus first argues that the soul is simple, then notes that a simple being cannot decompose. Many subsequent philosophers have argued both that the soul is simple and that it must be immortal. The tradition arguably culminates with Moses Mendelssohn's Phaedon.

=== Metochites ===
Theodore Metochites argues that part of the soul's nature is to move itself, but that a given movement will cease only if what causes the movement is separated from the thing moved – an impossibility if they are one and the same.

=== Avicenna ===
Avicenna argued for the distinctness of the soul and the body, and the incorruptibility of the former. (Note: For Avicenna's views, see: Moussa, Dunya, & Zayed (1960); Arberry (1964); Michot (1986); Janssen (1987); Marmura (2005)(complete translation).)

=== Aquinas ===
The full argument for the immortality of the soul and Thomas Aquinas' elaboration of Aristotelian theory is found in Question 75 of the First Part of the Summa Theologica.

=== Descartes ===
René Descartes endorses the claim that the soul is simple, and also that this entails that it cannot decompose. Descartes does not address the possibility that the soul might suddenly disappear.

=== Leibniz ===
In early work, Gottfried Wilhelm Leibniz endorses a version of the argument from the simplicity of the soul to its immortality, but like his predecessors, he does not address the possibility that the soul might suddenly disappear. In his monadology he advances a sophisticated novel argument for the immortality of monads.

=== Moses Mendelssohn ===
Moses Mendelssohn's Phaedon is a defense of the simplicity and immortality of the soul. It is a series of three dialogues, revisiting the Platonic dialogue Phaedo, in which Socrates argues for the immortality of the soul, in preparation for his own death. Many philosophers, including Plotinus, Descartes, and Leibniz, argue that the soul is simple, and that because simples cannot decompose they must be immortal. In the Phaedon, Mendelssohn addresses gaps in earlier versions of this argument (an argument that Kant calls the Achilles of Rationalist Psychology). The Phaedon contains an original argument for the simplicity of the soul, and also an original argument that simples cannot suddenly disappear. It contains further original arguments that the soul must retain its rational capacities as long as it exists.

== Ethics ==
The possibility of clinical immortality raises a host of medical, philosophical, and religious issues and ethical questions. These include persistent vegetative states, the nature of personality over time, technology to mimic or copy the mind or its processes, social and economic disparities created by longevity, and survival of the heat death of the universe.

=== Undesirability ===
Physical immortality has also been imagined as a form of eternal torment, as in the myth of Tithonus, or in Mary Shelley's short story The Mortal Immortal, where the protagonist lives to witness everyone he cares about die around him. For additional examples in fiction, see Immortality in fiction.

Shelly Kagan (2012) (Note: Kagan, Shelly (2012). Death. New Haven, CT: Yale University Press. pp. 238–246. Kagan notes that his argument is an adaptation of a similar argument given by the British philosopher B. Williams (1973).) argues that any form of human immortality would be undesirable. Kagan's argument takes the form of a dilemma. Either our characters remain essentially the same in an immortal afterlife, or they do not:

- If our characters remain basically the same – that is, if we retain more or less the desires, interests, and goals that we have now – then eventually, over an infinite stretch of time, we will get bored and find eternal life unbearably tedious.
- If, on the other hand, our characters are radically changed – e.g., by God periodically erasing our memories or giving us rat-like brains that never tire of certain simple pleasures – then such a person would be too different from our current self for us to care much what happens to them.

Either way, Kagan argues, immortality is unattractive. The best outcome, Kagan argues, would be for humans to live as long as they desired and then to accept death gratefully as rescuing us from the unbearable tedium of immortality.

== Sociology ==
If human beings were to achieve immortality, there would most likely be a change in the world's social structures. Sociologists argue that human beings' awareness of their own mortality shapes their behavior. With the advancements in medical technology in extending human life, there may need to be serious considerations made about future social structures. The world is already experiencing a global demographic shift of increasingly ageing populations with lower replacement rates. The social changes that are made to accommodate this new population shift may be able to offer insight on the possibility of an immortal society.

Sociology has a growing body of literature on the sociology of immortality, which details the different attempts at reaching immortality (whether actual or symbolic) and their prominence in the 21st century. These attempts include renewed attention to the dead in the West, practices of online memorialization, and biomedical attempts to increase longevity. These attempts at reaching immortality and their effects in societal structures have led some to argue that we are becoming a "Postmortal Society". Foreseen changes to societies derived from the pursuit of immortality would encompass societal paradigms and worldviews, as well as the institutional landscape. Similarly, different forms of reaching immortality might entail a significant reconfiguration of societies, from becoming more technologically oriented to becoming more aligned with nature.

Immortality would increase population growth, bringing with it many consequences as for example the impact of population growth on the environment and planetary boundaries.

== Politics ==
Although some scientists state that radical life extension, delaying and stopping aging are achievable, there are no international or national programs focused on stopping aging or on radical life extension. In 2012 in Russia, and then in the United States, Israel and the Netherlands, pro-immortality political parties were launched. They aimed to provide political support to anti-aging and radical life extension research and technologies and at the same time transition to the next step, radical life extension, life without aging, and finally, immortality and aim to make possible access to such technologies to most currently living people.

Some scholars critique the increasing support for immortality projects. Panagiotis Pentaris speculates that defeating ageing as the cause of death comes with a cost: "heightened stratification of humans in society and a wider gap between social classes". Others suggest that other immortality projects like transhumanist digital immortality, radical life extension and cryonics are part of the capitalist fabric of exploitation and control, which aims to extend privileged lives of the economic elite. In this sense, immortality could become a political-economic battleground for the twenty-first century between the haves and have-nots.

General Secretary of the Chinese Communist Party Xi Jinping and President of Russia Vladimir Putin discussed organ transplants and "immortality" during the 2025 China Victory Day Parade. This conversation is caught recorded by China Central Television's public broadcast. During the conversation, Putin spoke about biotechnology and "human organs will continue to be transplanted, and people will became younger and younger". Xi responded Putin, talking about how people predicted that life expectancy can reach up to 150 years and how 70 years old still is quite young compared to the past. At the press conference during the evening, Putin clarified to Russian media that he and Xi did discuss about the topic of human lifespan.

== Symbols ==
The ankh

There are numerous symbols representing immortality. The ankh is an Egyptian symbol of life that holds connotations of immortality when depicted in the hands of the gods and pharaohs, who were seen as having control over the journey of life. The Möbius strip in the shape of a trefoil knot is another symbol of immortality. Most symbolic representations of infinity or the life cycle are often used to represent immortality depending on the context they are placed in. Other examples include the Ouroboros, the Chinese fungus of longevity (lingzhi), the ten kanji, the phoenix, the peacock in Christianity, and the colors amaranth (in Western culture) and peach (in Chinese culture).

== See also ==
- Afterlife
- Ambrosia
- Amrita
- Bioethics
- Biogerontology
- Brooke Greenberg
- Crown of Immortality
- Dyson's eternal intelligence
- Elixir of life
- Eternal return
- Eternal youth
- Ghost
- Immortal DNA strand hypothesis
- Immortalist Society
- Immortality in fiction
- Lich
- List of people claimed to be immortal in myth and legend
- Methuselah Mouse Prize
- Molecular nanotechnology
- Negligible senescence
- Tipler's Omega Point
- Organlegging
- Neidan
- Palm branch
- Posthuman
- Resurrection
- Queen Mother of the West
- Simulated reality
- Suspended animation
- Undead
- Regeneration (theology)
