= Cross and Star Church, Southwark =

Church in London, England

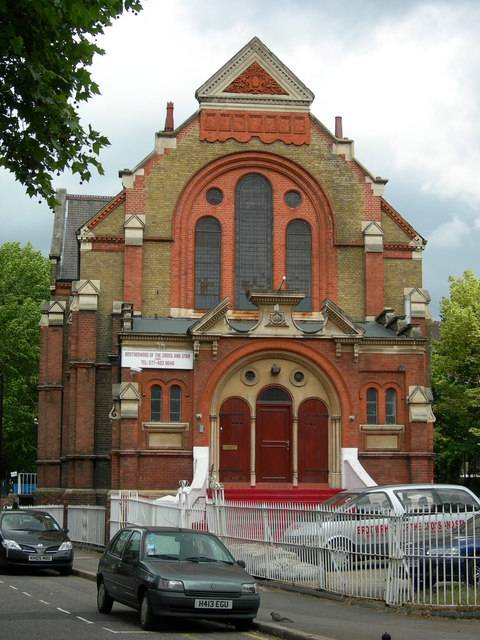
- Church of All Saints in 2007

Religion
- Affiliation: Brotherhood of the Cross and Star
- Ecclesiastical or organizational status: active

Location
- Location: London, England
- Interactive map of Cross and Star Church, Southwark
- Coordinates: 51.495031°N 0.094996°W

Architecture
- Type: Church
- Style: Queen Anne style architecture Romanesque Revival architecture
- Completed: 1888

The Cross and Star Church is a Grade II listed historic church affiliated with the Brotherhood of the Cross and Star in the Elephant and Castle area of the London Borough of Southwark. The church is located north of the former Heygate Estate and is on the corner of Falmouth Road and County Street.

== History ==
The church was constructed in 1888 as a Welsh Presbyterian Chapel. The church is in the mixed style of Queen Anne and Romanesque Revival. In 2016, the church was added to the Heritage at Risk Register by Historic England.

The Welsh congregation ended in 1982 at the point it had dwindled to just 20 members. The Brotherhood of the Cross and Star congregation started in 1985.

== See also ==
- List of churches in London
