= Vihangamyoga =

Indian school of yoga and meditation

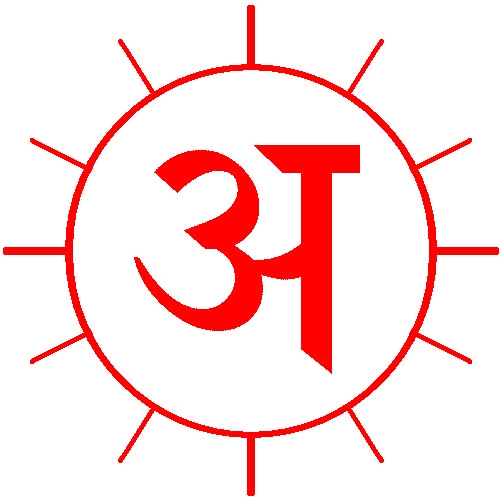
Logo of Vihangam Yoga

Vihangam Yoga is an Indian school of yoga and meditation with branches in over 50 countries. It claims to teach an ancient Indian meditation technique. The school was founded by Sadguru Sadafal Deo Ji Maharaj in 1924.

The Economic and Social Council (ECOSOC) of the United Nations awarded "special consultative status" to Sadguru Sadafal Deo Vihangam Yoga Sansthan in Allahabad in 2013, among 160 other organisations.

A controlled trial on the effects of Vihangam Yoga meditation in 15 practitioners with at least ten years' experience, compared to matched control subjects, showed that the yogis performed better on average on each test of attention, namely attention span, processing speed, attention alternation ability, and performance in interference tests.

== Bibliography ==
- Deo, Sadafal (2015) [1938]. Swarved (Bhashya Sahit) [Swarved (With Exposition)] (in Hindi) (20 ed.). Allahabad: Sukrit Offset Press. p. 1156. ISBN 978-8192069661.
