= Brotherhood of the Cross and Star =

Religious organisation founded in 1956 by Olumba Olumba in Nigeria

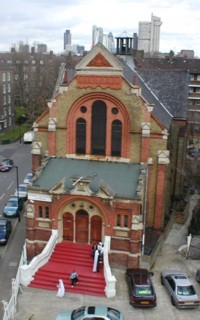
Cross and Star Church in Elephant and Castle, London

Brotherhood of the Cross and Star (BCS) is a new religious movement founded in 1956 by Olumba Olumba in Calabar, Cross River State, Nigeria. It differs from mainstream Christianity in that it considers itself not a church but the new Kingdom of God on Earth, and that its founder, Olumba Olumba Obu, is the Holy Spirit personified, the God of all creation. BCS incorporates into Christian teaching ideas of incarnation and reincarnation and also advocates veganism.

== Beliefs ==
The BSU has been described as a new religious movement with a mixture of influences. A central belief of BCS is love towards all. BCS members wear white robes, extensively study the Bible and practice fasting. BCS is open to all races, classes, ages and genders. They teach that faith should be used to cure disease and medicine should be avoided. The BCS website says that "BCS do not believe in medicine of any form".

During prayer, BCS have "sitting members" and those who give "public witness". The latter wear white robes, and pray barefooted on their knees after knocking their head three times on the ground as a gesture to God. The white robes refer to (Revelation 7:13) and the barefootness to an incident when Moses was asked to take off his shoes (Exodus 3:5).

BCS teaches that Jesus did not have time to fully communicate his beliefs before crucifixion, and Obu’s role has been to explain, expand upon and add to his teaching. This is why a part of Brotherhood teaching has no counterpart in either the Old or the New Testament.

BCS rejects the existence of witchcraft and condemns divination and polygyny. BCS have published books through the Brotherhood Press. They have over 2 million followers mostly in Nigeria and Ghana, Britain, France, Germany, Ukraine and the United States.

== Incarnation ==
BCS teaches that Adam was the first "divine incarnation", followed by Enoch, Noah, Melchizedek, Moses, Elijah, Jesus Christ and finally Obu. The eight incarnations are described as "God in mortalization" as God is omnipresent but occasionally incarnates as mortal life. BCS teaches reincarnation. Because of a belief in the transmigration of souls between humans and animals, BCS members practice veganism.

As the final ‘divine incarnation’, Obu was declared to be immortal by Brotherhood members, who will not say today whether he is physically still alive (it has been suggested he died in 2003). His son, Rowland, has assumed his father’s name and the two personalities are often conflated.

== Veganism ==
The consumption of alcohol, meat and tobacco is forbidden. BCS members are vegan and disapprove of processed food. Meat is blamed for causing aggression and disease in society.

== Millenarianism ==
In the 1990s Obu made pronouncements that led followers to believe that the physical world would end in the year 2000 (and when this did not come to pass, in 2001). Members of Brotherhood have subsequently re-interpreted this as their misunderstanding of Obu’s teachings, claiming that he meant only that they would be entering a new spiritual era.

== National politics ==
BCS is not politically inclined, but its members are involved in Nigerian politics. Their spiritual leader Olumba Olumba Obu makes declarations and predictions about Nigerian politics.

== International aspirations ==
BCS has bethels (churches) in several countries other than Nigeria, and formed a "Government", sending ambassadors to several countries. The BCS has a cable TV station called "Starcross TV".
