= Olumba Olumba =

Nigerian religions leader

- Olumba Olumba In Cross River state.

Olumba Olumba Obu (1918–2003?) was a Nigerian religious leader whom his followers believe to be God in human form. He was the founder of the Brotherhood of the Cross and Star, an organization which has been described as a new religion.

During his lifetime, some adherents believed he had almost supernatural powers. Others suspected him of practicing occultism. Members of his spiritual organization claim Olumba Olumba was not entirely human, but part human and part spirit.

== Early life ==
Olumba was born in 1918 in Biakpan, a small village in Cross River state which is the South South region of Nigeria inhabited predominantly by the minority tribes of Nigeria. Olumba had no formal education.

== Biography ==
Olumba Olumba Obu was the founder of the Brotherhood of the Cross and Star (BCS). It was formed in 1956 in Calabar, the capital of Cross River State, Nigeria, and registered in March 1964 as a "religious organisation under the Land (perpetual succession) Act cap 98 Laws of the Federation of Nigeria." Over the next fifty years, it gained recognition by assisting disadvantaged children and adults. A school was built and job training was provided to followers. Membership in the church grew and in 1980, it had approximately 600,000 followers, and over 1 million, worldwide, by the 1990s. Olumba Olumba Obu's followers referred to him as "OOO", and painted the letters on their homes and cars.

The organization has been described as a new religion, a "prime example of the kind of syncretist religion that sprang up in Africa during the colonial period."

In 2000, Olumba was said to have transferred leadership of the BCS organization to his eldest son, also named Olumba Olumba Obu, but known as Rowland. BCS was reported to have been dismantled in 2003.

In 2020 a church spokesperson, Christ Shepherd Edet Archibong, stated that although the elder Olumba Olumba Obu was no longer seen in public, he was alive and well, having turned over administration of the "Kingdom" to his son, "King of Kings and Lord of Lords, His Holiness Olumba Olumba Obu" who would celebrate the 20th anniversary of his coronation on 9 August 2020. Archibong said that although BCS was not a church/religion or family enterprise, business assets of the organization include "[a] printing press, royal farms, rubber plantation, palm plantation, bakery and table Water."

== Theology ==
Olumba Olumba was familiar with Judeo‐Christian religion, and his followers considered him to be "God in human form … He is Jesus Christ back on earth". Olumba Olumba's view was that Jesus Christ failed to obtain true enlightenment, due to his sins, despite eight reincarnations. He stated that Christ's final reincarnation is "under the name of Olumba Olumba Obu." Olumba Olumba claimed to receive revelations, which coupled with his personal Biblical interpretation, resulted in his own "system of doctrines", which were considered doctrinally unorthodox, and viewed by some as un‐Christian.

== Millenarianism ==
In the 1990s Obu made pronouncements that led followers to believe that the physical world would end in the year 2000 (and when this did not come to pass, in 2001). Members of Brotherhood have subsequently re-interpreted this as their misunderstanding of Obu’s teachings, claiming that he meant only that they would be entering a new spiritual era.

== Death disputed ==
The members of his spiritual organization claim he is immortal, alive and well, whereas a former follower states that he died in 2003.

== Family ==
Olumba Olumba Obu, referred to as “Sole Spiritual Head of the Universe,” had eight or nine children. The eldest children, Olumba Olumba Obu (Rowland) and Helen Ibum Udoh (née Olumba) were based in Nigeria. Three younger children, Ajah Obu, Fred Obu, Mary Obu, Emmanuel Obu, Elizabeth Obu, and Orlando Obu entered the US to pursue an education, and later set up residency, careers and family.

In 2000/2001, Rowland and Helen Ibum, began to contend for the right of succession to their father. This encompassed spiritual control of the Brotherhood of the Cross and Star, well as control of "the religion’s considerable finances." In Nigeria, this split led to violent clashes between followers, as well as lawsuits.

By 2006, the disputes had spread to the US based siblings. Ajah Obu, “the Supreme Mother of Peace, Love and Justice,” and her brother, Fred Obu, filed lawsuits against one another, regarding the right to sell church property in the US.
