= A201 road =

Road in Central London

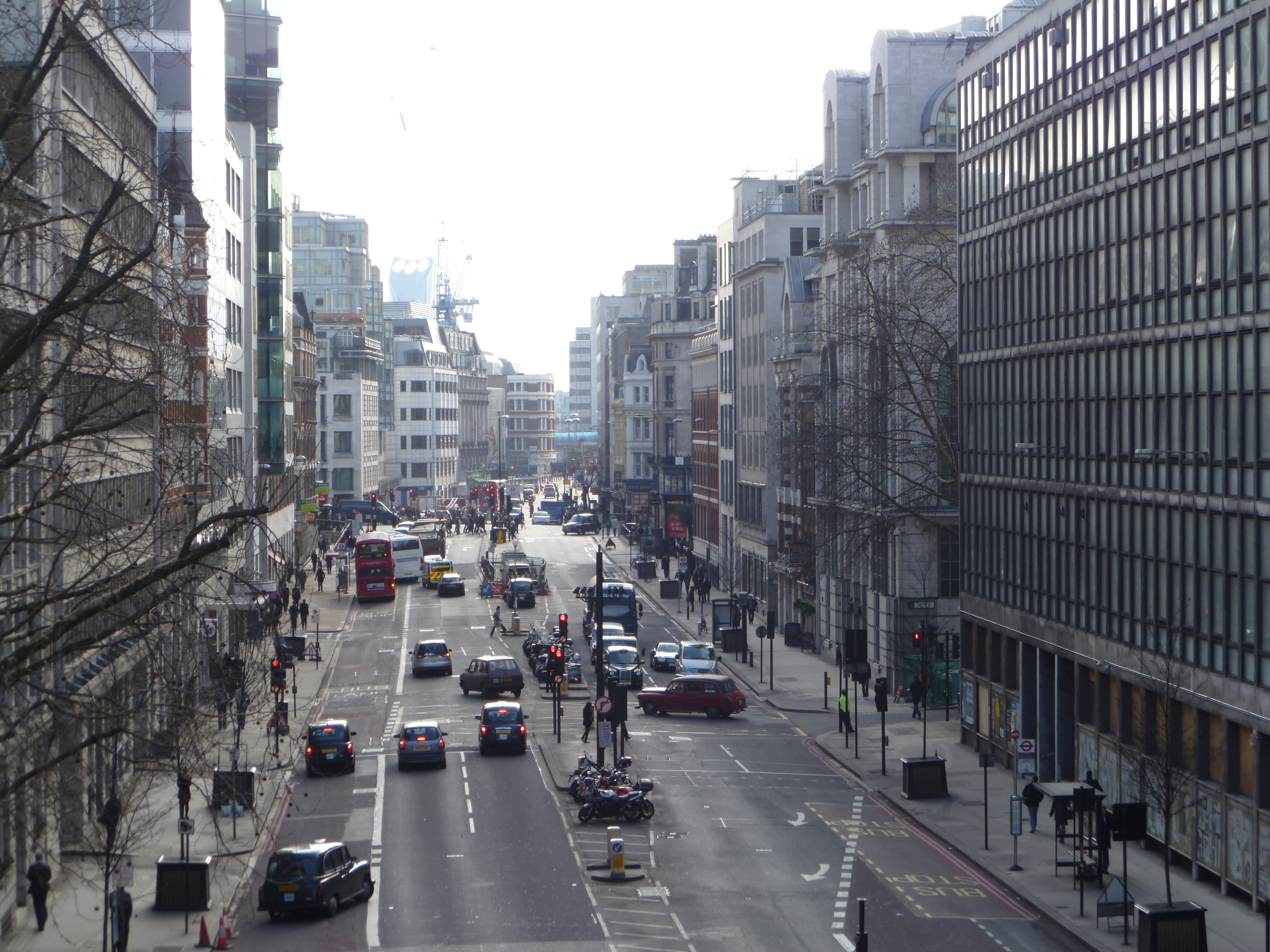
- Farringdon Street, part of the A201, pictured from the Holborn Viaduct in 2012

Route information
- Existed: 1863–present

Major junctions
- North end: Kings Cross
- A501 – A5200 – A401 – A5201 – A3211 – A3200 – A3202 – A302 – A3 – A100 – A2 –
- South end: Bricklayer's Arms

Location
- Country: United Kingdom
- Primary destinations: Central London (The City); Elephant and Castle

Road network
- Roads in the United Kingdom; Motorways; A and B road zones

The A201 is an A road in London, England running from Kings Cross to Bricklayer's Arms.

== London Inner Ring Road ==
A small stretch of the road between Bricklayer's Arms and Elephant and Castle (New Kent Road) forms part of the London Inner Ring Road.

== London Congestion Charge zone ==
Apart from this section, the road is entirely in the London congestion charge zone. The route is managed by Transport for London (TfL).

== Thameslink ==
The Thameslink rail route roughly follows that of the A201 between St Pancras International and Elephant & Castle.

== Route ==
=== London Borough of Islington ===
Beginning to the east of King's Cross St Pancras tube station, the route runs south from Pentonville Road (the Ring Road) along King's Cross Road. It leaves the main King's Cross gyratory near the Clink78 hostel, signposted towards the City of London.

The road passes the Mount Pleasant Mail Centre, situated on the western side of the road, reaching Clerkenwell at a junction with the A401/Rosebery Avenue.

Continuing south, the route becomes Farringdon Road, passing Farringdon station as it leaves the London Borough of Islington.

=== City of London ===
The A201 enters the City of London at a junction with Charterhouse Street (which leads to Holborn Circus, the A4, and the A40). It passes underneath the A40/Holborn Viaduct as it slopes downhill towards Ludgate Circus.

Crossing Ludgate Circus, the road passes Blackfriars station. Leaving the City, the route crosses the River Thames via Blackfriars Bridge.

=== London Borough of Southwark ===
The road continues south through the London Borough of Southwark, passing Southwark tube station. At St George's Circus, southbound traffic may continue towards Elephant and Castle along London Road. With the exception of buses and cycles, northbound traffic is routed along the A302/St George's Road and A3202/Westminster Bridge Road between Elephant and Castle and St George's Circus.

The route turns east at Elephant and Castle, becoming New Kent Road (the Ring Road eastbound towards Lewisham). The route ends at Bricklayer's Arms at a junction with the A100/Tower Bridge Road and the A2/Great Dover Street. Traffic continuing on the main carriageway joins the A2/Old Kent Road.

New Kent Road was created in 1751 when the Turnpike Trust upgraded a local footpath.

== Landmarks ==
- King's Cross St Pancras station
- St Pancras station
- King's Cross station
- Mount Pleasant Mail Centre
- Postal Museum
- Exmouth Market
- Hatton Garden
- Farringdon station
- Smithfield Market
- Museum of London
- Holborn Circus
- Holborn Viaduct
- City Thameslink station
- Ludgate Circus
- Blackfriars
- Blackfriars station
- Blackfriars Bridge
- One Blackfriars
- Southwark tube station
- St George's Circus
- Elephant & Castle
- Elephant & Castle tube station
- Elephant & Castle railway station
- Bricklayer's Arms

== Cycleway 6 ==
Cycleway 6 (C6) runs alongside the A201 between Farringdon and Elephant and Castle.

C6 joins the A201 near Farringdon station, heading south on traffic-free cycle track on either side of Farringdon Road. Southbound cyclists cross Farringdon Road to the south of the Holborn Viaduct, where the route continues as a two-way bike freeway towards Blackfriars Bridge.

On the northern side of Blackfriars Bridge, there is a junction between C6 and Cycleway 3 (CS3). The segregated cycle route continues south from Blackfriars towards St George's Circus, after which it turns west towards St George's Street. C6 meets Cycle Superhighway 7 (CS7) near the Elephant and Castle junction.

North from Farringdon, C6 runs unbroken and signposted to Kentish Town, via Bloomsbury, St Pancras, and Camden Town.
