= Driscoll House =

Hotel in the London Borough of Southwark, England

Coordinates: 51.4938°N 0.0905°W

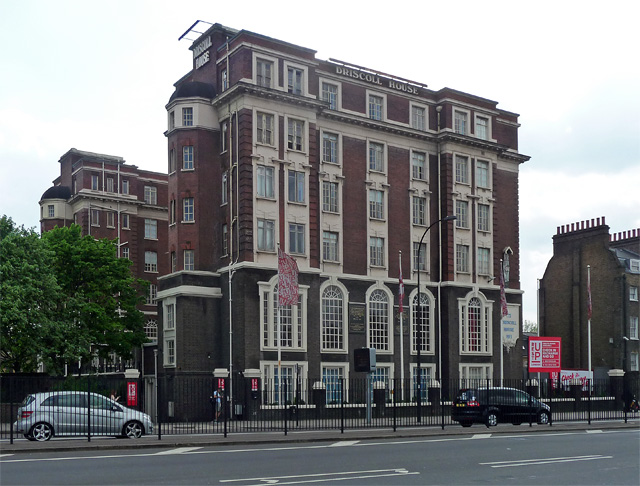
Driscoll House

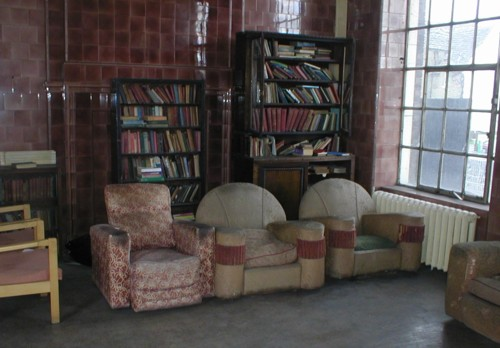
A TV lounge, 2006

Driscoll House is a building at 172 New Kent Road, London, England, which has operated as a hostel since 1913. The building is on the south side of New Kent Road, between the Bricklayers Arms flyover and Elephant and Castle station, and is a well-detailed example of the pre-World War I institutional Baroque style.

In 2024 the building was exclusively used by the Home Office to house refugees pending processing. In May 2024, immigration removals at this location were blocked by an anti-raids group.

By March 2025 Driscoll House started once again operating as the Rest Up London hostel, providing up to 625 beds across 7 floors.

== Ada Lewis House ==
When it opened as "Ada Lewis House" in 1913, it was one of the first of a small number of accommodation places for women in London. The opening ceremony was performed by Princess Louise, Duchess of Argyll, and the building was named after Ada Lewis, widow of philanthropist Samuel Lewis.

== Driscoll House ==
The building was eventually bought in 1965 by Terence Driscoll, founder of the International Language Club in Croydon. He renamed the building after himself, and two plaques were later added to the front of the building in remembrance of the 335,451 men and women of the Commonwealth (left plaque) and the 292,131 Americans (right plaque), who gave their lives in the two World Wars. The plaques were unveiled on 13 August 1995. Mr Driscoll unveiled the left plaque, and the right plaque was unveiled by representative of Admiral William James Crowe, US Ambassador to the UK from 1994 to 1997.

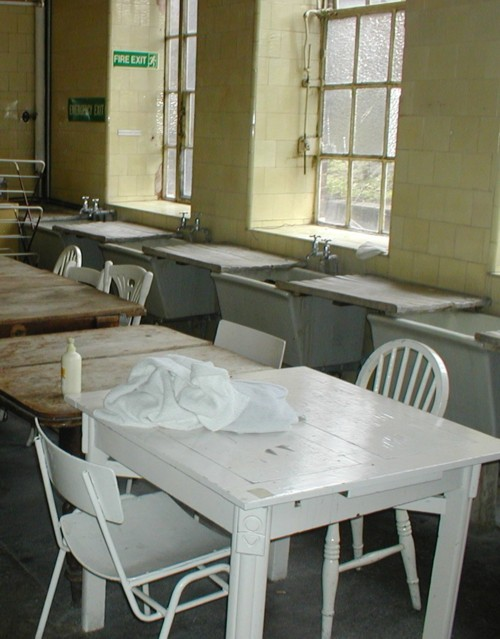
Laundry room, 2006

The hotel had around 200 beds. The typical single room had a bed, wardrobe and chest of drawers, although this varied, with some rooms having no wardrobe and some having three crammed into the small space. There were communal bathrooms and toilets. The interior of the hotel was largely unchanged since 1913, with green and red tiled walls in the television rooms and lounges. The hotel had pianos, and on the bottom floor there was the kitchen, small dining room, large dining room with long tables, a table tennis room, and a laundry room complete with mangle. One major change that did occur over the years was that early in 1978, the policy was changed so that male as well as female guests were accepted. One floor was however reserved for female guests, and it was frowned on for men even to appear in the corridors of that floor.

The hotel's rates were cheap. For example, up until the hotel's closure in 2007, a single room cost just £30 per night / £150 per week, including breakfast and evening meal per weekday, and breakfast, lunch and evening meal per day on Saturday and Sunday, which made it one of the cheapest, if not the cheapest, accommodation London. ( In 1984, it was £10 per day and £50 for a week.) The hotel offered short-term and long-term accommodation. Several residents had lived there long-term, including one woman who was believed to have been there fifty years. At one time, the hotel stated that over the years 50,000 guests from 210 different countries had stayed there.

After Mr. Driscoll took over the hotel, Driscoll House included a large number of religious paintings and other religious artefacts. These, it was said, were added by Mr. Driscoll as a loving gesture to his wife, who was, apparently, a devout Roman Catholic. In one of his weekly addresses, Mr. Driscoll reported that many years earlier, when it was still the Ada Lewis House, a resident had reported having a vision of the Virgin Mary in her room. He encouraged residents to remember this whenever they were tempted to entertain members of the opposite sex in their rooms.

Even in his latter years, Terence Driscoll worked daily at the hotel reception, which had a small shop selling chocolates, etc., as well as postcards featuring Mr Driscoll himself. Also, Mr Driscoll would give a weekly speech in the hotel at Sunday lunch, which, apart from the usual notices, could include news from past residents, as well as his opinions on some issues of current affairs in the world. And on Christmas Day, Mr Driscoll would dress up as Father Christmas and appear at the Christmas Day lunch, whereupon presents would be given out and carols sung.

In his 2003 book, Do Not Pass Go, Tim Moore describes his visits to the locations of all the Monopoly squares in London. As he ends his journey at the Old Kent Road, he tries to stay at Driscoll House, but Mr Driscoll turns him away, explaining that the hostel is for foreign students only. Moore's Icelandic wife, Birna, does manage to stay at Driscoll House for one night.

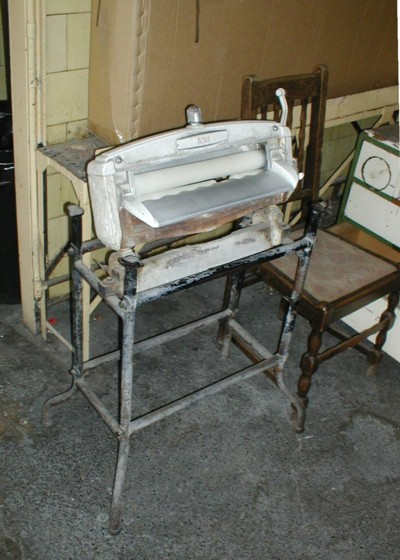
The mangle, 2006

In November 2005, Terence Driscoll, then 93 years old, was fined £16,000 at Camberwell Green Magistrates Court for food hygiene violations. He told the court that he had recently sold Driscoll House for more than £1 million. In December 2005, Southwark Council refused a planning application by Ujima Housing Association and Oracle Homes to demolish Driscoll House and redevelop the site into 91 affordable homes.

In March 2006, a local campaign group applied to make Driscoll House a listed building. Driscoll House was due to close at the end of that month, but with the refusal of the planning application and the pending application for listed status, the hotel then planned to remain open for another three years. Later in 2006, Driscoll House was designated a Grade II listed building.

Terence Driscoll continued to be active in the running of Driscoll House until his very last weeks and celebrated his 95th birthday in the building. He died in June 2007, aged 95. His funeral was held on 4 July 2007 in Southwark Cathedral, and was attended by more than sixty people. During the service, a passage from St John's Gospel was read by grandson Simon Shilston. The Dean of Southwark, commenting on the reading during his address, highlighted Christ's words: 'In my house there are many dwelling-places'. "This is especially appropriate in that Terry Driscoll's work throughout most of his life was devoted to his hotel and accommodating as many people as possible." Terence Driscoll died leaving three daughters, a son and a grandson.

Simon Hughes, MP for North Southwark and Bermondsey, paid tribute. He said: “Terence Driscoll was a larger than life individual, who ran a unique sort of hotel for many years in our borough. Many people from all over the world will miss him and certainly there will not be his sort of gentleman active in public life in Southwark again.”

Driscoll House closed the weekend after Mr Driscoll's funeral.

== Rest Up London ==
After a major refurbishment, the building reopened as a hostel in August 2012 under the name Rest Up London. The building itself is still called Driscoll House. The new hostel has maintained some of the elements of the old Driscoll House decor, including the original tiling in the communal areas, and the "BBC1" and "BBC2" door signs on the former TV lounges: in Terence Driscoll's day, each lounge was designated for viewing a single channel, which could not be changed.
