= New Kent Road =

Road in Southwark, London, England

Coordinates: 51°29′39″N 0°05′34″W

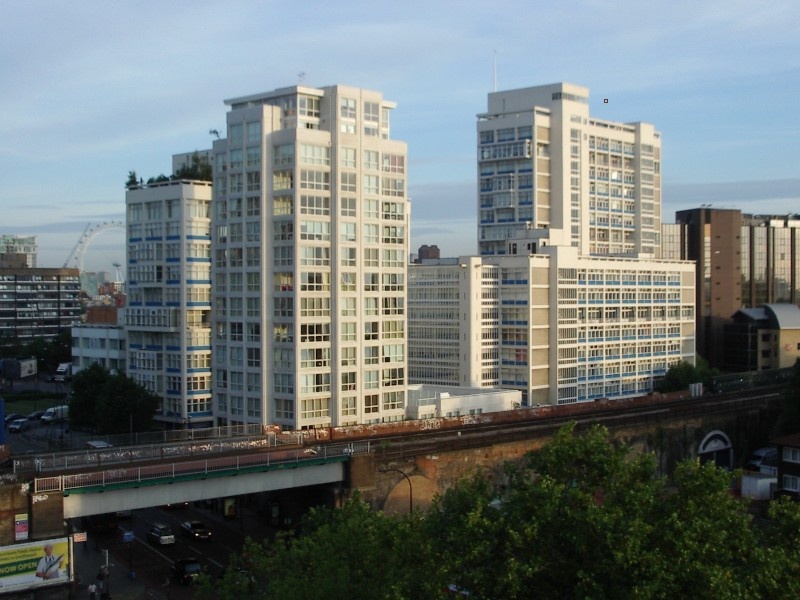
View from the western end of New Kent Road looking northwest towards Metro Central Heights, designed by Ernő Goldfinger in the 1960s.

New Kent Road is a 1 kilometre (0.6 mi) road in the London Borough of Southwark. The road was created in 1751 when the Turnpike Trust upgraded a local footpath. This was done as part of the general road improvements associated with the creation of Westminster Bridge; in effect it was possible to travel from the West End/ Westminster to the south-east without having to go via the Borough of Southwark but could now cross St George's Fields to the junction of Newington Causeway and Newington Butts which is where New Kent Road starts at Elephant & Castle. The route runs eastward for a few hundred yards to the junction of Great Dover Street and Tower Bridge Road, known as Bricklayers Arms, where it joins the original route to the south-east Old Kent Road (the A2).

The road forms part of the London Inner Ring Road and as such forms part of the boundary of the London congestion charge zone. New Kent Road is designated the A201 which, to the north-west past the Elephant & Castle, becomes London Road.

In 1878, historian Edward Walford noted that the New Kent Road was formerly named Greenwich Road, and explained that "[it] is a broad and open roadway; it has been lately planted on either side with trees, so that in course of time it will doubtless form a splendid boulevard, of the Parisian type, and one worthy of being copied in many other parts of London."

The 1955 Survey of London still maintained that "[the] road also has a spaciousness lacking in many of its 19th-century counterparts, for the 1751 Act stipulated that the road should be not less than 42 feet (13 m) wide and many of the older houses still retain their front gardens." Just a few older houses still remain, mostly on the south side.

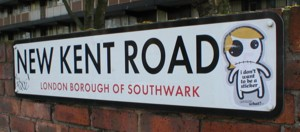
New Kent Road street sign

== South side ==
=== Elephant and Castle to Elephant Road ===
The southern side of New Kent Road starts at the site of the former Elephant & Castle Shopping Centre, built in the 1960s and often cited as London's ugliest building. It was demolished in 2021 and the site is being redeveloped as a new town centre with 1000 homes and a new campus of London College of Communication..

The 1955 Survey of London reports that 16–18 New Kent Road, part of the current site of the new town centre, was "the auction yard for horses, ponies and vehicles known as the London (Elephant and Castle) Repository."

At 26 New Kent Road, a pub attached to the Shopping Centre was named after a famous local ex-resident Charlie Chaplin. It is said that Chaplin had a martini at the pub during a visit to the area in the 1950s. It closed in 2018 and was demolished in 2020.

Until it closed in 2018 The Coronet club and music venue stood at 28 New Kent Road. The site was first occupied by the Theatre Royal, built in 1872 and destroyed by fire only six years later. Rebuilt as the Elephant and Castle Theatre in 1879, Charlie Chaplin performed there. It was converted to an ABC cinema in 1928. After several more name changes, it became the Coronet Cinema in 1981. The Coronet Cinema closed down in 1999, leaving the Elephant & Castle area with no cinemas until the proposed new Everyman cinema opens in late 2026..

Elephant Road is a short road that connects New Kent Road with the Walworth Road. The railway arches on the west side house previously housed the Corsica Studios art space and there are several businesses selling Latin American goods.

=== Elephant Road to Rodney Place ===
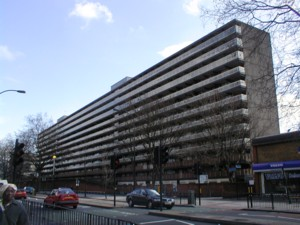
Heygate Estate from New Kent Road

East of the railway bridge is the site of the large Elephant Park complex of businesses and residential units which is still under construction. It is being developed by Oakmayne Properties who also built the nearby South Central East residential building on Walworth Road. The site of Oakmayne Plaza was formerly occupied by UK's largest used Volvo showroom and the Elephant Road Industrial Estate. From Elephant Road to Rodney Place previously stood the Heygate Estate

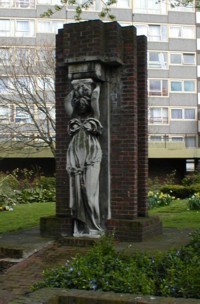
Two Caryatids sculpture by Henry Poole

In the summer of 2008, a 35 feet (11 m) high sculpture of a stag by Ben Long was erected on the Oakmayne Plaza site. It was constructed from scaffolding materials, and after a few months was dismantled and reformed into a new structure on a new site.

Multi-coloured spherical lights in the trees were installed in 2005 by the Elephant Impacts project. The project has repainted and added feature lighting to a number of bridges and buildings in the area, including the adjoining railway bridges on Walworth Road and Newington Causeway, and to London College of Communication and the Metropolitan Tabernacle. Proposed feature lighting at Metro Central Heights was abandoned when residents feared it would cause light pollution.

Crossway United Reformed Church was the last part of the Heygate Estate that remained standing, until it closed in 2017 and was relocated to a new building nearby. The Two Caryatids sculpture by Henry Poole, originally created in 1897 for the old Rotherhithe Public Library, stood in a locked garden behind the church for many years, but was removed in 2009

A footbridge that connected the Heygate Estate with the north side of New Kent Road was demolished in 2014.

=== Beyond Rodney Place ===
At 128 New Kent Road, Watling House is a new development of flats managed by the Landmark Housing Association.

The distinctive Baroque style building at 172–180 is Driscoll House. It was originally built as a women's hostel in 1913 and became a hostel primarily aimed at international students, until it closed in 2007. It reopened as Restup London in 2012, extensively refurbished but with some of the distinctive tiled interiors of Driscoll House still intact.

There is a small green space next to Driscoll House, and beyond Searles Road there is a larger one called Paragon Gardens, named after the building erected on the site in 1787, designed by Michael Searles, the Surveyor of the Rolls Estate (and architect of The Paragon, Blackheath). It was demolished in the 1890s when the road was widened and replaced with more modest housing — on Searles Road — and the Paragon School for Girls and Boys, later under the ILEA (Inner London Education Authority) Paragon Secondary Boys' School with Sixth Form. The school closed in 1988 and was for a number of years run by Southwark Council as a centre for Evening Classes and art studios before finally being sold for private development and converted into a residential building named The Paragon.

== North side ==
=== Metro Central Heights to Falmouth Road ===
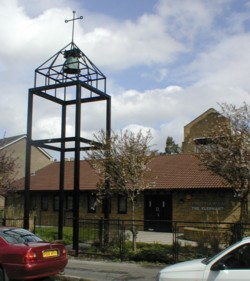
St Matthews at the Elephant

The first few hundred yards of New Kent Road consist of the Elephant and Castle pub and the Metro Central Heights residential block, although both premises have addresses on Newington Causeway, not New Kent Road. A plaque next to the Metro Central Heights convenience store explains that this was previously the site of the Trocadero Cinema at 1–17 New Kent Road, which closed in 1963.

Beyond the railway bridge stands Albert Barnes House, an 18-storey block of council flats owned by the London Borough of Southwark. From 1883 to 1886, this was the site of a fish and provisions market promoted by Samuel Plimsoll. Albert Barnes House was completed in 1964 and contains 99 flats. There was a serious fire in Albert Barnes House in the early hours of 30 January 2007 and all 250 residents were evacuated. One flat was gutted, and another seriously damaged

At Meadow Row stands St Matthews at the Elephant, a contemporary Anglican church and community centre built in 1993 on a site near to the old St Matthew's church (Southwark Holy Trinity and St Matthew) which was demolished in 1992. The church has particularly good acoustics and hosts musical performances as well as community events and services. The main building is built low, with the separate minimalist iron spire at the street entrance suggesting old and new-style church architecture simultaneously. It includes some rented flats.

83 New Kent Road was a residence for students at the nearby London South Bank University, but is being developed into housing..

=== Falmouth Road junction ===
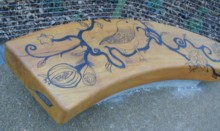
The bench in Falmouth Road Park

The small Falmouth Road Park opened in March 2006. The original bench was made from timber from a London plane tree that once stood on the Tower of London Wharf, and featured designs created by local children. The bench deteriorated and was replaced with a plain design in 2022. The park became popular with street drinkers, addicts and homeless people, and in November 2024 Southwark council installed lockable gates and started locking the park from sunset to 0730.

Next to the park, Tavern Court at number 95 is a six-storey shared-ownership residential building managed by Family Mosaic Housing Association, and which opened in 2005. The site was previously occupied by the County Terrace Tavern, a pub that was built in 1811. At the Old Bailey in 1836, the proprietor's lawyer insisted that the County Terrace Tavern was misnamed: "the right name is County Coffee-house—they should alter it—it is situated in the county Terrace, New Kent-road.". It closed in 2003 and was demolished.

The Museum of London Archaeology Service surveyed the site in May 2004 and found that "There was no evidence to confirm that this site was occupied until the post medieval period. It appears that this low lying area ... was fields until the development of the County Terrace public house and adjoining properties during the 19th century. A thick layer of top soil containing 18th and 19th century material including broken bricks, clay pipe stems and 19th century pottery was found."

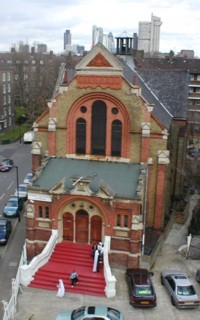
The Cross and Star Church of the Brotherhood of the Cross and Star

The 1888 red brick church behind Tavern Court is the former Welsh Presbyterian Chapel, a listed building designed by Charles Evans-Vaughan in mixed Queen Anne and Romanesque revival styles. English Heritage comments that "[the] combination of different features and materials [is] calculated to produce a most variable and picturesque composition. An early instance of the Queen Anne manner applied to a church or chapel." Since 1991, the church has been the main London home of the Brotherhood of the Cross and Star, an African Initiated Church based in Nigeria and led by Olumba Olumba Obu, who followers describe as "the sole spiritual head of the universe". Worshippers wear distinctive white robes known as "soutane", with women also wearing a wimple-like headdress.

=== David Copperfields Garden ===
The narrow public garden from here to Harper Road is called David Copperfields Garden. A plaque placed on a plinth in the garden in September 1931 by the Dickens Fellowship explained that this was the place where in the Charles Dickens novel, David Copperfield stopped "in the Kent Road ... at a terrace with a piece of water before it, and a great foolish image in the middle, blowing a dry shell". The plinth had a small statue that eventually lost both its shell and its head to vandalism. The plinth and plaque were removed in 2006 when the park was closed for redevelopment.

It reopened in July 2007 after a complete re-landscaping, including removal of the railings between the footpath and the garden. The original design included benches based on the milestones that David Copperfield passed on his fictional journey, but the final version has no benches. With the removal of the plinth and plaque, the only remaining reference to the Dickens novel is a quotation from Copperfield's aunt inlaid into the path through the park: "...a little change, and a glimpse of life out of doors, may be useful, in helping you to know your own mind..."

=== Harper Road to the Bricklayers Arms ===
At the corner of Harper Road is a five-storey residential block comprising fifteen apartments, with a branch of Tesco Metro on the ground floor. The site formerly housed Pole Position, a motorcycle workshop and racing team HQ that relocated to East London in 2009.

Adjacent to this is a short parade of commercial premises. In 2005, journalist Peter Preston noted that the multi-cultural nature of the area is that this block of businesses includes an African hairdresser, a Turkish grocers, a Chinese take-away and a Bolivian restaurant. Only the Bolivian restaurant remains.

The petrol station and attached supermarket have rebranded many times. Originally a BP station with a Safeway shop, it became a Marks & Spencer Simply Food store, then in 2016 a Spar forecourt supermarket in 2016 when the petrol station changed from a to Esso franchise. The commercial premises now includes a branch of Costa Coffee. The building was home to an Amazon locker until its removal in 2019.

The last building on the north side of New Kent Road, after Bartholemew Street, is St Saviour's and St Olave's Church of England School on land given by Lord LLangatock (of the Rolls family) to the ancient Southwark grammar school foundation which was required to provide a girls school to supplement its teaching of boys. This opened in 1903 as a grammar school and is for girls aged 11 to 18.

Bricklayers Arms is the site of an important road intersection with the Old Kent Road and was formerly the site of an important railway terminus.
