= London Inner Ring Road =

Major roads that encircle the centremost part of London

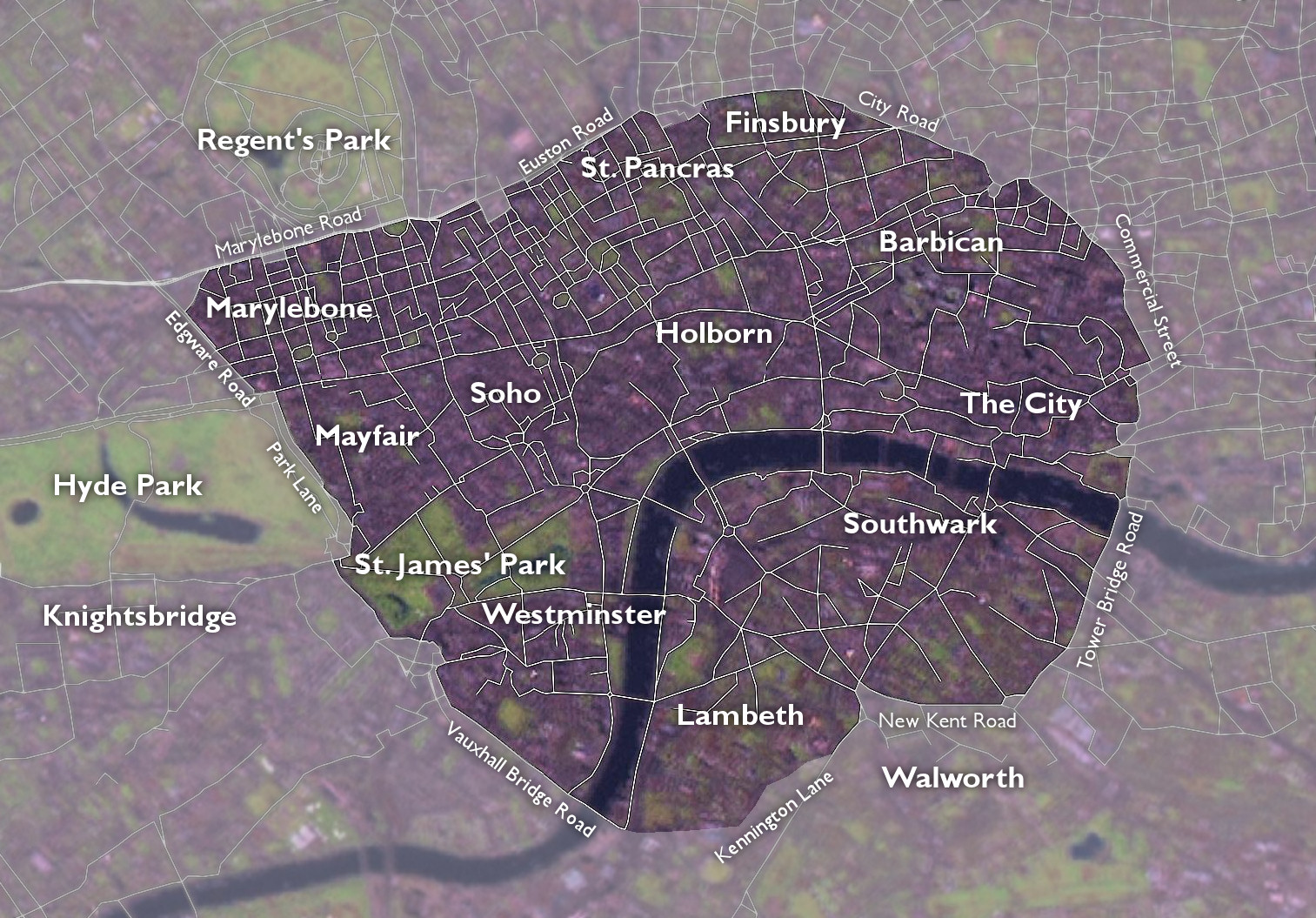
The congestion charge applies within the London Inner Ring Road.

The London Inner Ring Road, or Ring Road as signposted, is a 12-mile (19 km) route with an average diameter of 2.75–5.5 miles (4.43–8.85 km), formed from a number of major roads that encircle Central London. The ring road forms the boundary of the London congestion charge zone, although the ring road itself is not part of the zone.

Starting at the northernmost point and moving clockwise, the roads defining the boundary are Pentonville Road, City Road, Old Street, Great Eastern Street, Commercial Street, Mansell Street, Tower Bridge, Tower Bridge Road, New Kent Road, the Elephant & Castle, Kennington Lane, the roads that constitute the Vauxhall Cross one-way system and Vauxhall Bridge, Vauxhall Bridge Road, the roads that constitute the Victoria one-way system, Grosvenor Place, Park Lane, Edgware Road, Old Marylebone Road, Marylebone Road and Euston Road.

The route is described as the Inner Ring Road because there are two further sets of roads that have been described as London ring roads. The North and South Circular Roads together form the second ring road around London, averaging 10–15 miles (16–24 km) in diameter. The M25 motorway is the outermost road encircling the metropolis, at an average diameter of 40–50 miles (64–80 km).

== History ==
Plans for an Inner Ring Road were put forward by Patrick Abercrombie in the 1940s, in the County of London Plan.

== Constituent roads ==
The route is signed as "Ring Road" and is made up of the following:

Route	Roads
A501	City Road, Pentonville Road, Euston Road; from Paddington station to Moorgate via King's Cross (part of the historic New Road)
A5201	Old Street, between Old Street Roundabout and junction with Great Eastern Street
A1202	Great Eastern Street / Commercial Street
A1210 / A1211	Mansell Street
A100	Tower Hill, Tower Bridge Approach, Tower Bridge Road, Bricklayers Arms
A201	New Kent Road
A3204	Kennington Lane
A202	Vauxhall Bridge Road
A302	Grosvenor Place, Lower Grosvenor Place, Bressenden Place
A4202	Park Lane
A5	southern section of the Edgware Road between Sussex Gardens and Marble Arch

=== Historic New Road ===
Construction of the New Road from Paddington to Islington began in 1756 to relieve congestion in the built-up area of London. At that time the districts of Marylebone, Fitzrovia and Bloomsbury were on the northern edge of the city, and only the southern parts of them had been built up. The New Road ran through the fields to the north of these three neighbourhoods.

The road is now one of the busiest main roads in the city. It runs from Edgware Road in the west to Angel, in the east. After being renamed in 1857, the western section between Edgware Road and Great Portland Street is known as Marylebone Road, the central section between Great Portland Street and King's Cross is known as Euston Road, and the eastern section from King's Cross to The Angel is called Pentonville Road.

City Road was constructed in 1761 to continue the route eastwards to the northern edge of the City of London.

=== Pentonville Road ===
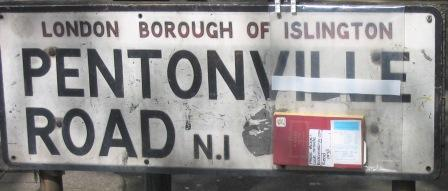
A battered street sign

Pentonville Road runs west-to-east from Kings Cross to City Road.

By far the greater portion of the road is in the London Borough of Islington but a small part near Kings Cross is in the London Borough of Camden, including an entrance to King's Cross St Pancras Underground station at the former King's Cross Thameslink station. It acquired its present name in 1857.

Several halls of residence are located on Pentonville Road: Dinwiddy House (SOAS), Paul Robeson House and Nido Student Living. There are two green spaces along the road, Joseph Grimaldi Park and Claremont Square; the latter's central green area, however, is not open to the public.

This street is distinguished by the "set back" housing lines originally intended to provide an atmosphere of spaciousness along the thoroughfare. It is one of the locations on the UK version of the Monopoly board game, which features areas of London.

Pentonville Road is one of the many London place names mentioned in the song "Transmetropolitan" by the Pogues.

=== Mansell Street ===
Mansell Street is a short road, part of the A1210 route (though sometimes shown as being the A1211), which for most of its length marks the boundary between the City of London and the London Borough of Tower Hamlets, though the southernmost part is entirely in Tower Hamlets. It runs from Aldgate southwards to the Tower of London. The northern part, north of the junction with Goodmans Yard and Prescot Street, has one-way northbound traffic, while the southern part has one-way southbound traffic.

=== Tower Bridge Road ===
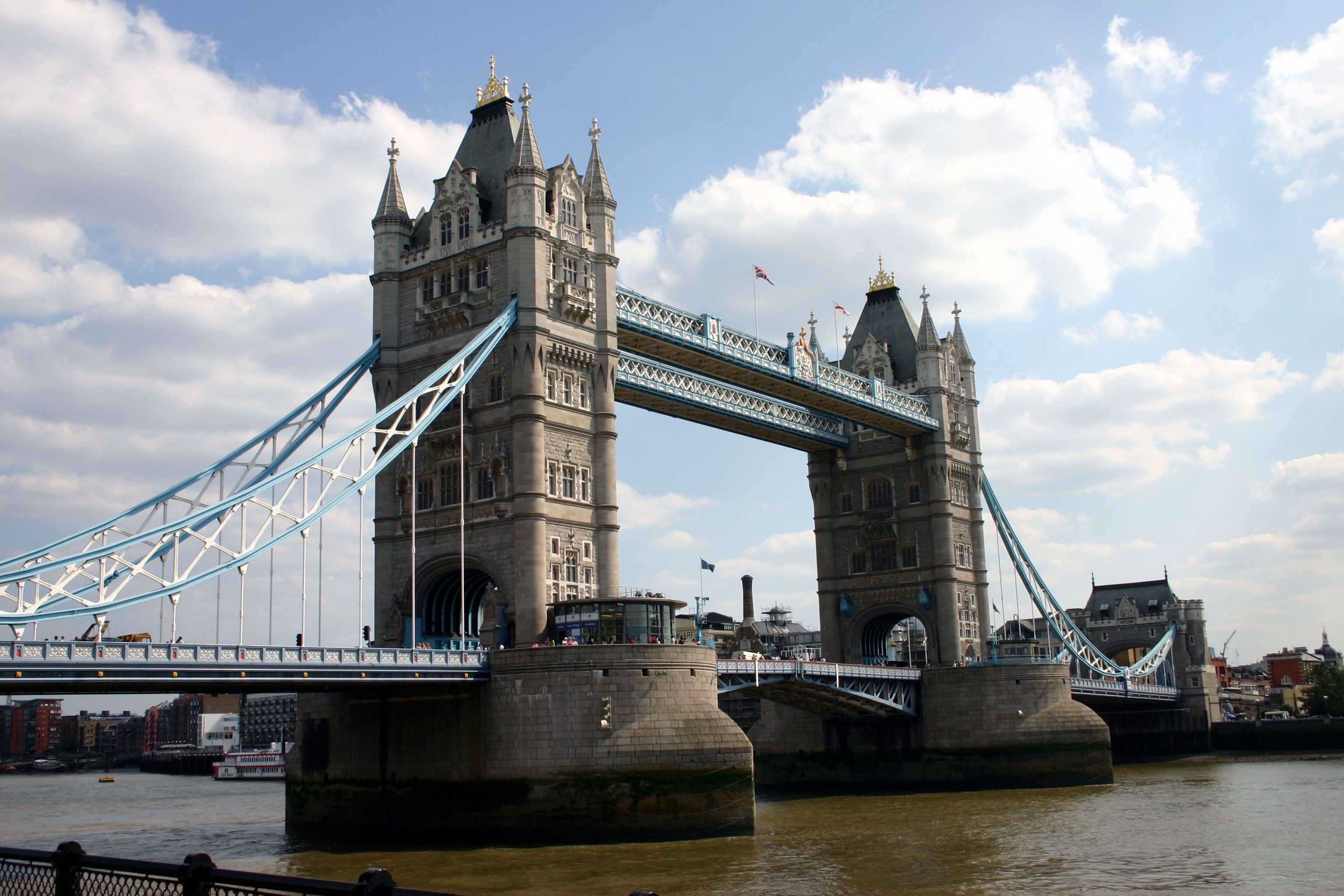
Tower Bridge

Tower Bridge Road is a road in Bermondsey in the London Borough of Southwark. It runs north-to-south, and connects the Bricklayers Arms roundabout and flyover at its southern end (New Kent Road and Old Kent Road) to Tower Bridge and across the River Thames at its northern end. It also links to Long Lane.

The road has an abundance of antique (or junk) shops along part of its length. There is also Bermondsey Square which holds an 'antique' market every Friday morning, usually known as Bermondsey Market, though officially as New Caledonian Market.

Towards its southern end are a collection of shops, pubs and takeaways.

=== Kennington Lane ===
Kennington Lane is an A-road (classified A3204) running between the Elephant & Castle to the east and Vauxhall to the west.

Starting at the Elephant, Kennington Lane splits off from the A3 by means of a Y-junction, where Newington Butts becomes Kennington Park Road. Heading in a southwesterly direction, the road then crosses the A23 Kennington Road, before reaching the Vauxhall one-way system, where the A3036 Albert Embankment and Wandsworth Road, A202 Vauxhall Bridge, Durham Street and Harleyford Road, A203 South Lambeth Road, and A3205 Nine Elms Lane all converge.

=== Vauxhall Bridge Road ===
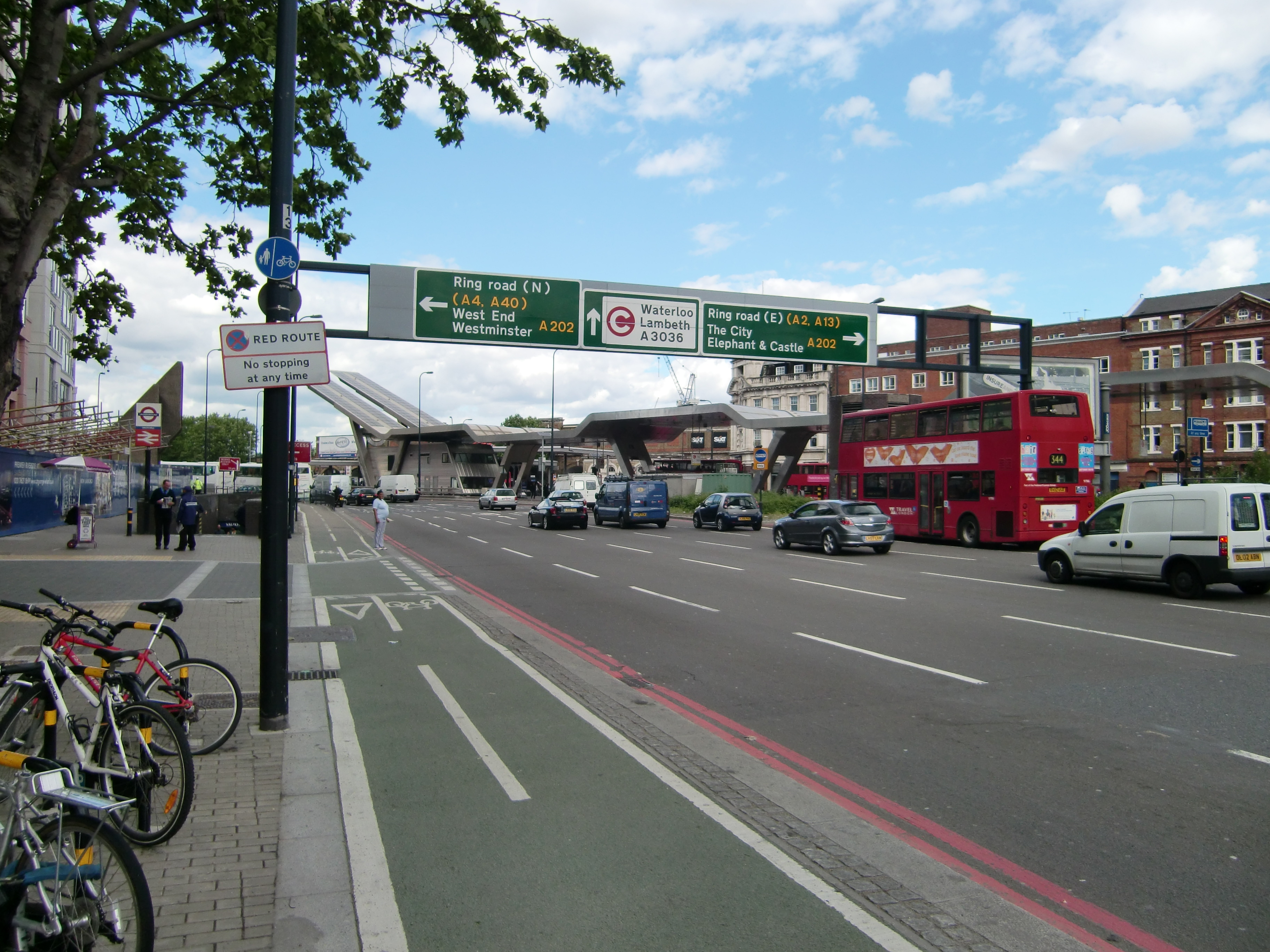
Approaching the ring road at Vauxhall cross

Vauxhall Bridge Road runs south-east to north-west from Vauxhall Cross, over the River Thames to Victoria station. At the southernmost point the road runs past the headquarters of MI6. The section immediately after Vauxhall Bridge north of the Thames is called Bessborough Gardens and is home to the Embassy of Lithuania. Further along is the Embassy of Mauritania.

=== Victoria one-way system ===
The Victoria one-way system lies in front of Victoria station. Clockwise, it includes Lower Grosvenor Place, Bressenden Place, and the west end of Victoria Street.

== See also ==
- County of London Plan
- London Ringways
- North Circular
- South Circular
- M25 motorway
- Garden Ring in Moscow
