= Michael Searles =

British architect

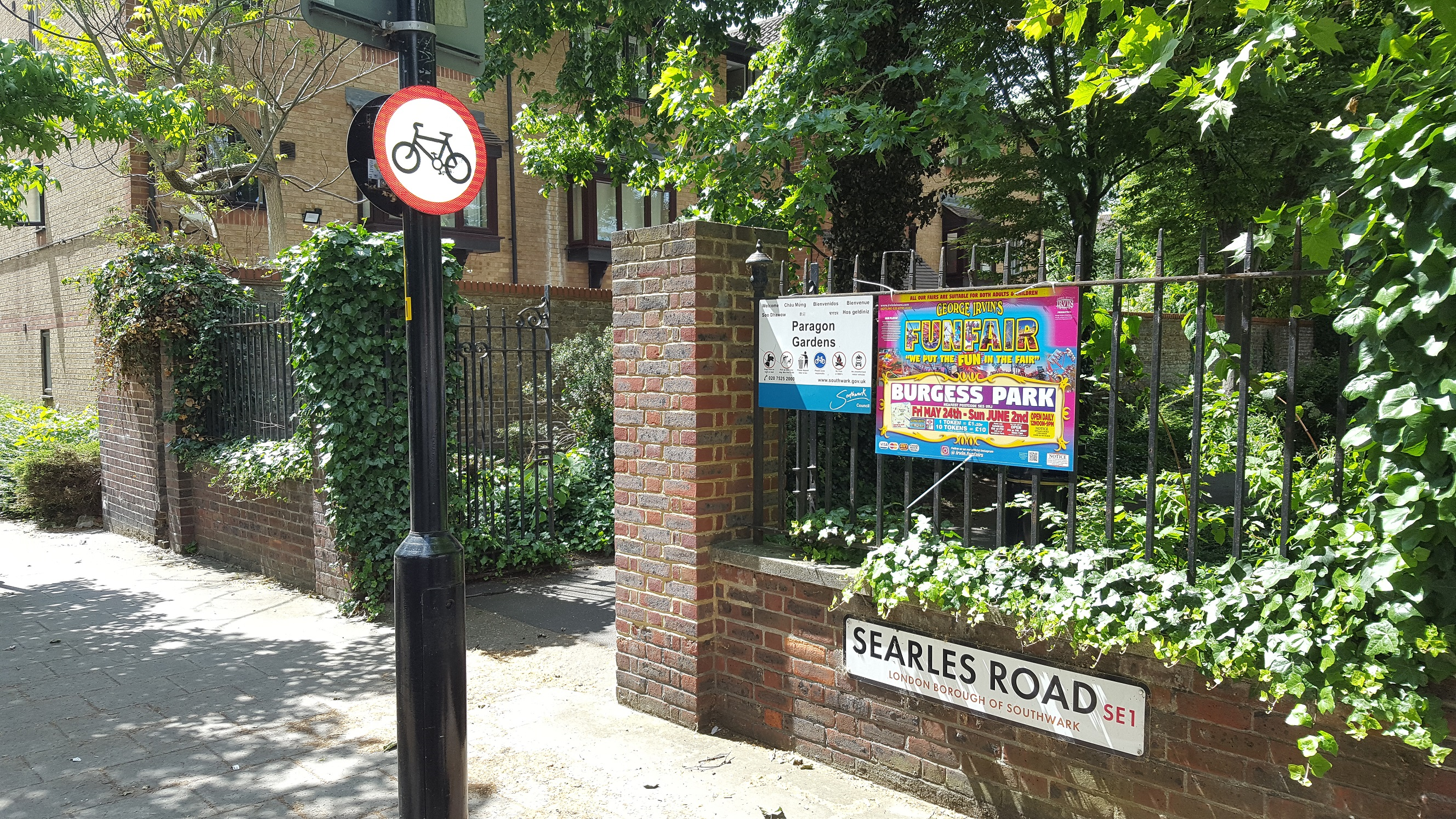
A Southwark street commemorating Michael Searles in its name

Michael Searles (1750–1813) was an English commercial architect of large houses, particularly in London. His most notable achievement is perhaps The Paragon in Blackheath.

Searles was the son of a Greenwich surveyor, also named Michael Searles (c. 1722–1799), who served (from 1765) as surveyor to Morden College in Blackheath. Searles and his father formed an unofficial father and son partnership producing plans in and around Greenwich before Searles junior set up his own practice.

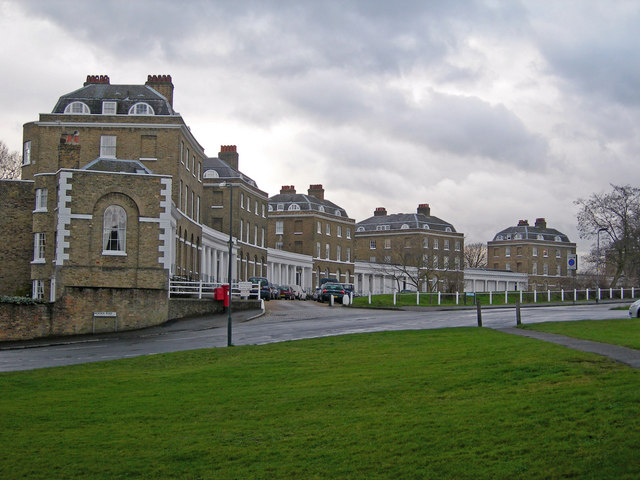
The Paragon, Blackheath.

Landowner John Cator granted development leases to Searles and builder William Dyer to design and build a series of high quality dwellings, intended to appeal to upper middle class buyers, situated on the south-east side of Blackheath. Facing the heath, South Row and Montpelier Row were erected from 1794 to 1805.

However, Searles's masterpiece was the adjacent Paragon, a 14-house perfect crescent occupying a semicircular plot in the corner of the Heath. The Paragon (today Grade I listed buildings) comprises seven blocks of semi-detached houses, each linked by a single story colonnade, with a lodge house at each end. Each house was different internally: Searles would provide the buyer with a brick shell which could then be fitted out to suit the buyer's tastes and budget. However, the scheme nearly ruined Searles financially; the development took ten years to build, with the last house not occupied until 1805.

Apart from his own home at 155 Old Kent Road, other London works include:

- Deptford Union, 70-82 Blackheath Road [Grade II Listed] (1786)
- 31 Blackheath Road, London SE10
- Marlborough House, 317 Kennington Road, Kennington (c. 1787)
- 114-132 Kennington Park Road (1790)
- 23 Champion Hill, Camberwell (1791)
- south part of Gloucester Circus crescent, Greenwich (1791–1809)
- Surrey Square, Walworth (c. 1793)
- A terrace in Southgate Green, north London

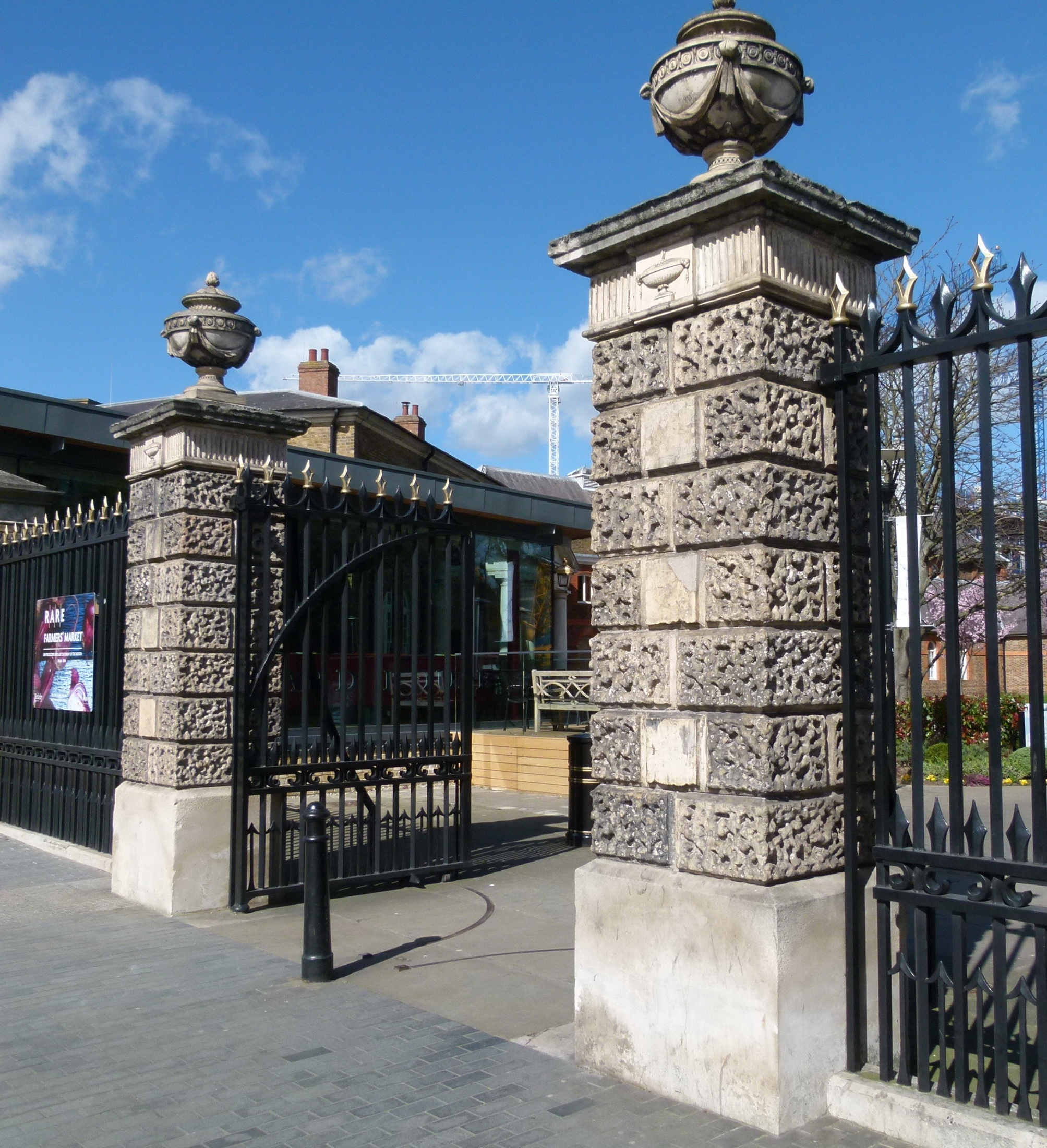
Searle's surviving gate piers from The Paragon, New Kent Road (subsequently removed for road widening) were re-erected at the Royal Arsenal, Woolwich in 1985.

He built another Paragon before 1787 on the south side of New Kent Road, near the junction with Old Kent Road. This consisted of six blocks of semi-detached houses linked by a single-story colonnade. It was later extended to a complete semicircle fronting New Kent Road by the addition of a pair of houses at each end. It was demolished in the 1890s to be replaced by more modest housing and a Council school, which has since been converted into apartments and been given the name The Paragon.
