= Westminster motorcycle parking charge =

The Westminster motorcycle parking charge is a charge that Westminster City Council makes for parking motorcycles in designated on-street and off-street motorcycle parking bays in the City of Westminster. It was introduced in August 2008 as an Experimental Order made under the authority of the Road Traffic Regulation Act 1984. Experimental Orders may not, under the Act, last for more than 18 months, but do not require the formal advertisement and objection procedures of permanent Traffic Regulation Orders (TROs) made under the Act. In June 2009, Westminster Council gave notice that it was to turn this into a permanent Traffic Regulation Order.

== Rationale ==
The Council stated that its reason for introducing the charge was that, as a consequence of the introduction of the London congestion charge in 2003, many more people had taken to riding motorcycles into the City of Westminster. 2008 figures stated that 16,000 motorcyclists rode into London every day, a rise of 40% in 10 years. Before introducing the Experimental Order, the council increased the number of motorcycle parking bays from 4,500 to 6,400 (6,150 on-street and 400 off-street). Initially, the charge was £1.50 per day per motorcycle, with discounted rates for longer periods (£5 per week; £20 per month; £50 per quarter; and £150 per annum).

The permanent TRO differed from the Experimental Order in three major respects. Residents were allowed to park in designated motorcycle parking bays free of charge as long as they displayed a valid residents permit; parking in all of the off-street motorcycle parking bays was made free of charge; and the scale of charges was reduced. The new scale of charges was £1 per day per motorcycle, with discounted rates for longer periods (£3.50 per week; £13.50 per month; £33.50 per quarter; and £100 per annum).

== Consultation ==
Prior to the Experimental Order in 2007, the council had consulted with several interest groups, including the British Motorcyclists Federation (BMF). The BMF had campaigned against the charge, but in 2008 at the time of the issuance of the Experimental Order a spokesman reported that the Federation's members "on balance" thought that the deal of paying for parking spaces was "not a bad one", since motorcyclists didn't have to pay the London congestion charge and had lower running costs, even though the BMF members didn't like charges.

== Opposition ==
Subsequent to the Experimental Order, the formal protest group No To Bike Parking Tax was formed to oppose the measures. It presented formal objections to the council's Built Environmental Policy and Scrutiny Committee on 2009-03-31. It also organised several public protests, including "go-slows" where motorcyclists rode slowly through central London during peak "rush hour" traffic times causing road closures and traffic problems, in December 2008 and March 2009.

On 16 April 2010, a local councillor Daniel Hamilton from Runnymede, having had his journey to work delayed by half an hour by a No To Bike Parking Tax rush-hour "go slow", called the demonstrators "tossers" on his Twitter account. In response, he received 200 emails, numerous text messages and telephone calls, including 15 death threats. In June 2010, Boris Johnson was caught up in the protests and was heard to make what were alleged to be "threats" against demonstrators. In March 2009, Westminster councillors responded to what they perceived to be a "hate campaign" organised by protesters, where councillors' names, addresses, and telephone numbers had been posted on the Internet, alongside threatening statements that people who supported the parking charge "must accept the consequences of their actions" and statements calling for "total war" against staff at the council. Throughout, the Council maintained its position that the parking charges were necessary in order to meet the increased demand for motorcycle parking and would not be abolished. The campaigners maintained their opposition to the scheme, describing the councillors as "arrogant" and dismissing the charges that there was a "hate campaign" as an attempt to distract from the issue of the charge itself. The Council held that it was right that motorcyclists contributed towards road maintenance through the payment of a parking charge, while protesters countered that many motorcyclists could not afford the charge imposed.

=== High Court challenge ===
The No To Bike Parking Tax campaigners took the issue to the High Court, arguing that the parking charge was simply a device to raise revenue, and that the council had not undertaken proper consultation in line with the Road Traffic Regulation Act. By 2009, revenue that Westminster Council was obtaining from parking charges in general, some £81.5 million per annum from parking meters and parking fines, had already exceeded the £80 million per annum revenue that it was obtaining from council tax. Councillor Danny Chalkley, the council's cabinet member for city management, had stated then that no profit was made from parking charges, and that all surpluses (£35 million in 2008) were invested in the council's transport projects. Many of the protesters had already asserted, via electronic mail to councillors, letters, and petitions with more than 3,000 signatures, that the council was using the charge simply to raise revenue. By February 2009, the cost to the Council of creating the extra motorcycle parking bays and the additional security measures, some £300,000, had been exceeded by the £2.2 million that the council had obtained from parking charges and fines. The High Court ruled against the campaigners on both counts in July 2010. Lord Justice Pitchford, who heard the case alongside Mr Justice Maddison, stated that the scheme had not been invalidated by Westminster Council budgeting for a modest surplus, nor did that mean that there was an ulterior motive in charging motorcyclists. The Council stated, after the ruling, that it was seeking reimbursement of its £50,000 legal fees from Warren Djanogly, chairman of the NTBPT campaign, whose own legal fees were already estimated to be £70,000.
