= The Paragon, Blackheath =

Buildings in Blackheath, London

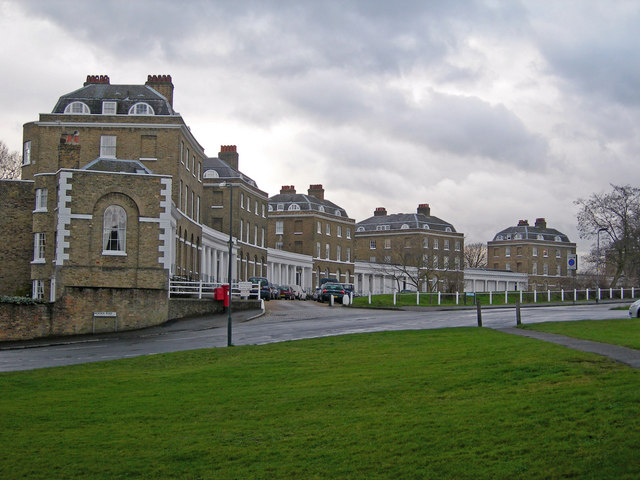
- The Paragon, Blackheath

- Location within Royal Borough of Greenwich
- 51°28′09″N 0°00′52″E
- Type: Housing
- Location: Blackheath
- OS grid reference: TQ 39966 76408

History
- Built: c. 1794-1806

Site notes
- Area: Greater London
- Architect: Michael Searles
- Architectural style: Georgian
- Owner: English Heritage

Listed Building – Grade I
- Official name: Numbers 1 to 14 (Consecutive) The Paragon, and Paragon Cottage and Paragon Lodge
- Designated: 19 October 1951
- Reference no.: 1211997

The Paragon, Blackheath is a curved crescent of 14 large houses built on a semi-circular plot in the south-east corner of the heath (common land) at Blackheath in southeast London. The houses, plus two adjacent buildings, were designed by architect Michael Searles. Today Grade I listed buildings, the Paragon group lies across the boundary between the London Borough of Lewisham and the Royal Borough of Greenwich and falls within Greenwich's Blackheath Conservation Area.

== History ==
The Paragon was built on land owned by John Cator (1728–1806). Around 1783, Cator had bought the Palladian Wricklemarsh mansion (formerly owned by Sir Gregory Page) and its 250-acre (1 km^{2}) estate. The mansion (designed by architect John James) was gradually demolished from 1787 onwards and Cator began to break up the estate into small packages of land to be individually developed.

Cator leased the land to Searles, who had recently (1788) completed another development, also called The Paragon, on the New Kent Road in Southwark, and Gloucester Circus, approximately 1 mile (1.6 km) away in Greenwich (completed in 1793); Searles's father (also called Michael Searles) was the land surveyor for nearby Morden College. From 1794, Searles Jr started developing The Paragon. It comprises seven blocks of semi-detached houses, linked by six single storey Roman Doric colonnades (said to incorporate pillars used in Page's Wricklemarsh mansion), with a lodge house at each end.

The first houses were occupied by 1800, and the crescent was complete by January 1806, though the speculative development nearly ruined Searles financially, and he built little more of note before his death in 1813.

Each house was different internally: Searles would provide the buyer with a brick shell - with a basement, ground floor, two upper floors and an attic - which could then be fitted out to suit the buyer's tastes and budget; each house incorporated servants' quarters, laundry, stabling and a coach house. Home-owners also shared some 9 acres (3.6 hectares) of pleasure grounds, with lawns, space for kitchen gardens, fish ponds, and pasture for cows; Cator regulated who could lease the houses (no school masters or fishmongers) to maintain the crescent's exclusive nature. Early residents included the family of English writer and feminist Mary Hays (from 1812 to 1819, at No. 3); other occupants were detailed in a 1976 book by W Bonwitt.

Over time, some of the houses were adapted for other uses - for example, a school, a private hotel, boarding houses - and the homes were subject to alteration and addition, damaging the original elegant design. During World War II, The Paragon suffered bomb damage. From 1947 to 1958, it was rescued, restored and converted into flats by architect Charles Bernard Brown, using reclaimed 18th century materials from other bomb-damaged sites. The 14 buildings comprising The Paragon, plus the adjacent Paragon Cottage and Paragon Lodge, were given Grade I Listed Building status on 19 October 1951. The listing also mentions a plaque on No 15 saying the development received a "Festival of Britain 1951. Award for Merit."

The boundary between Greenwich and Lewisham runs north-east to south-west through House No. 7. Old stone boundary markers are located in the grounds of The Paragon. The Listed Building record associates The Paragon with the Royal Borough of Greenwich, and it lies within Greenwich's Blackheath Conservation Area. The Conservation Area Appraisal says:

The Paragon was ... designed to impress. It succeeds in this ambition, using a colonnade to transform a sequence of freestanding pavilions into the sweep of a grand crescent. The rhythms of the columns, entrances and fenestration are wholly successful and the dark brick contrasts appealingly with the painted stonework. ... Mature trees in front of the crescent complement the architecture and provide a foil for its formal design, whilst allowing views of and from the Heath.
