= London congestion charge =

Fee for vehicles entering Central London

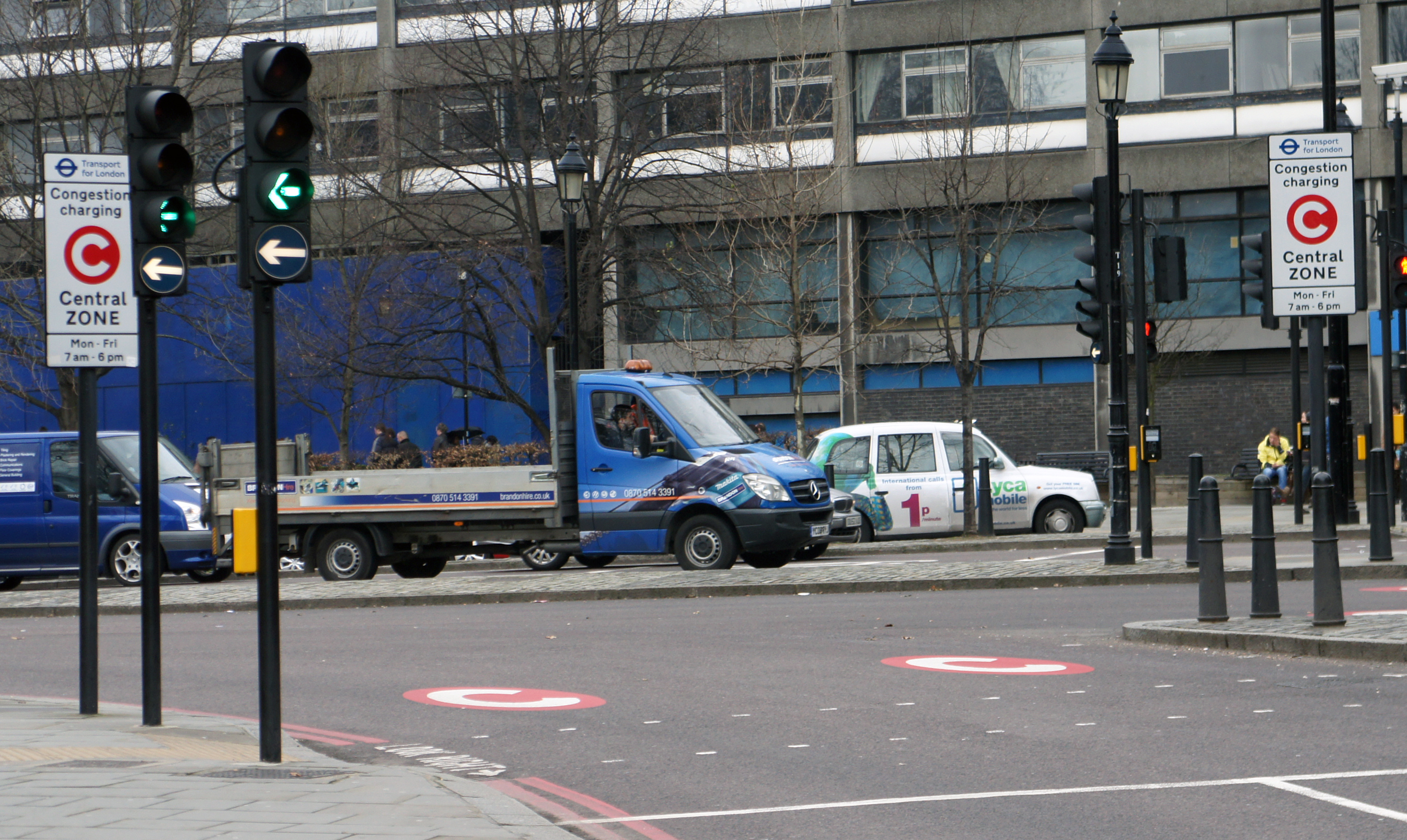
Street markings and signs with the white-on-red C alert drivers entering the charge zone at Tower Hill.

The boundary of the current congestion charge zone

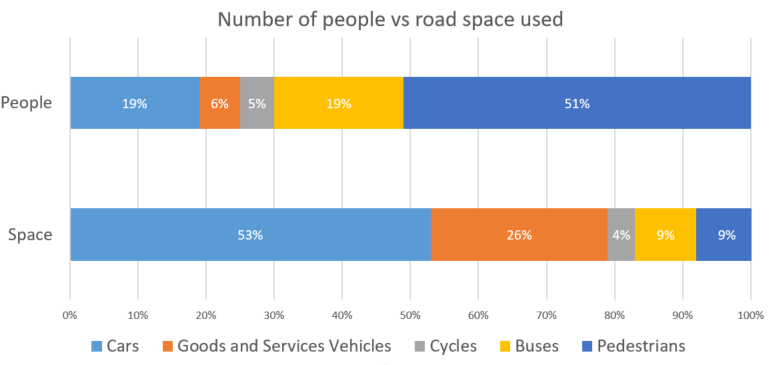
Numbers of people using different transport types in the City of London in 2017 against the road space used by that type.

The London congestion charge is a fee charged on most cars and motor vehicles being driven within the Congestion Charge Zone (CCZ) in Central London between 7:00 am and 6:00 pm Monday to Friday, and between 12:00 noon and 6:00 pm Saturday and Sunday. Enforcement is primarily based on automatic number-plate recognition (ANPR).

Inspired by Singapore's Electronic Road Pricing (ERP) system after London officials had travelled to the country, the charge was first introduced on 17 February 2003. The London charge zone is one of the largest congestion charge zones in the world, despite the removal of the Western Extension which operated between February 2007 and January 2011. The charge aims to reduce traffic volumes in central London, lower air and noise pollution, and generate revenue for investment in the city's transport system.

The amount and structure of the charge have changed over time. As of 2025 the standard charge was £15, Monday–Friday from 7:00 am to 6:00 pm, and 12:00 noon to 6:00 pm on Saturday and Sunday (and Bank Holidays), for each non-exempt vehicle driven within the zone, with a penalty of between £65 and £195 levied for non-payment. The standard charge increased to £18 from 2 January 2026, with annual increases in line with public transport fares and removal of some exemptions. The congestion charge does not operate from Christmas Day (25 December) and New Year’s Day (1 January) inclusive. In July 2013 the Ultra Low Emission Discount (ULED) introduced more stringent emission standards, which limit free access to the congestion charge zone to all-electric cars, some plug-in hybrids and any vehicle that emits 75 g/km or less of CO_{2} and meets the Euro 5 standards for air quality. On 8 April 2019, the Ultra Low Emission Zone (ULEZ) was introduced, which applies 24/7 to vehicles which do not meet the emissions standards: Euro 4 standards for petrol vehicles, and Euro 6 or VI for diesel and large vehicles. In October 2021 the ULEZ was expanded to cover the Inner London area within the North and South Circular Roads, and in August 2023 to all of Greater London. The ULEZ replaced the T-charge (toxicity charge), which applied to vehicles below Euro 4 standard. Since 2021 the congestion charge exemption has applied only to pure electric vehicles; from January 2026 electric vehicles have been subject to the charge, with a 25% discount on the full rate if they autopay.

Transport for London (TfL) is responsible for the charge, which has been operated by IBM since 2009. For the first ten years after the introduction of the scheme gross revenue reached about £2.6 billion up to the end of December 2013. From 2003 to 2013 about £1.2 billion was invested in public transport, road and bridge improvement and walking and cycling schemes. Of these, a total of £960 million was invested on improvements to the bus network.

Introduction of congestion charging was followed by a 10% reduction in traffic volumes from baseline conditions, and an overall reduction of 11% in vehicle kilometres in London between 2000 and 2012, though this does not prove that the reductions are due to the congestion charge. Despite these gains, traffic speeds have been getting progressively slower, particularly in central London. TfL explains that the historic decline in traffic speeds is most likely due to interventions that have reduced the effective capacity of the road network in order to improve the urban environment, increase road safety and prioritise public transport, pedestrian and cycle traffic, as well as an increase in roadworks by utilities and general development activity since 2006. TfL concluded in 2006 that, while levels of congestion in central London were close to levels before the charge was implemented, its effectiveness in reducing traffic volumes means that conditions would be worse without the congestion charging scheme, though later studies emphasise that causality has not been established.

== Present scheme ==
=== Boundary ===
Sign indicating the entrance of congestion charge area.

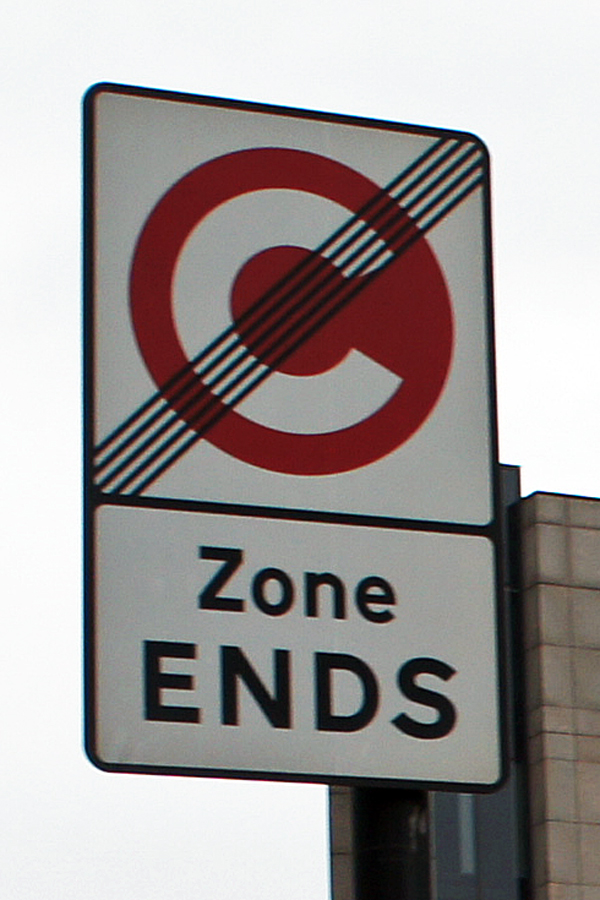
Sign indicating the exit of congestion charge area.

The current congestion charge zone covers the area within the London Inner Ring Road which includes both the City of London, which is the main financial district, and also the West End, which is London's primary commercial and entertainment centre. Although primarily a commercial area, there are also 136,000 residents, out of a total Greater London population of almost 9,000,000. There is little heavy industry within the zone.

Starting at the northernmost point and moving clockwise, the major roads defining the boundary are Pentonville Road, City Road, Old Street, Commercial Street, Mansell Street, Tower Bridge Road, New Kent Road, Elephant and Castle, Kennington Lane, Vauxhall Bridge Road, Park Lane, Edgware Road, Marylebone Road and Euston Road (other roads fill the small gaps between these roads). Signs were erected and symbols painted on the road to help drivers recognise the congestion charge area.

The Western Extension, introduced in February 2007 and removed on 4 January 2011, included areas surrounded by the following roads starting from the north-westernmost point: Scrubs Lane, Harrow Road, Westway (part of the A40), Park Lane, Vauxhall Bridge Road, Grosvenor Road, Chelsea Embankment, Earl's Court Road and part of the West Cross Route (A3220), but the Westway itself was not part of the zone.

=== Charges ===
Charges change (usually increase) and conditions and exemptions change from time to time. Current charges are listed on the official Web site.

In January 2013, Transport for London opened a public consultation to increase the standard charge by 15% by mid 2014, from £10 per day to £11.50, if paid in advance or on the day. The increase was expected to generate an estimated £84 million of additional revenue by the end of 2017/18. The consultation process ran from January 2014 to March 2014. According to TfL, the objective of the increase was to recoup inflation over the past three years and ensure the charge remains an effective deterrent to making unnecessary journeys in central London.

On 15 May 2020, the Congestion Charge was re-implemented following a period of suspension during the COVID-19 pandemic.

Evolution of the charge
| Date | Charge | Increase | Increase per year (avg) |
|---|---|---|---|
| February 2003 | £5 | – | - |
| July 2005 | £8 | 60% | 26.7%pa |
| January 2011 | £10 | 25% | 4.5%pa |
| June 2014 | £11.50 | 15% | 4.4%pa |
| June 2020 | £15.00 | 30.4% | 5.1%pa |

==== Fees and penalties ====
In June 2020 the penalty charges became:

The standard fee is £15 per day if paid in advance, by midnight on the day of travel, or if registered with Fleet Auto Pay or CC Autopay, an automated payment system which records the number of charging days a vehicle travels within the charging zone each month and bills the customer debit or credit card each month, or £17.50 if paid by midnight the third day after travel. Failure to pay after the third day after travel results in the issuance of a Penalty Charge Notice for £160, reduced to £80 if paid within 14 days, but increased to £240 if unpaid after 28 days.

The standard charge increased to £18 from 2 January 2026, with annual increases in line with public transport fares, and removal of some exemptions.

==== Discounts and exemptions ====
Refunds are available to people who pay monthly or annually in advance whose plans change. Reimbursements are available to NHS patients assessed to be too ill to travel by public transport, NHS staff using vehicles on official business, and care home employees. Residents living within or very close to the zone are eligible for a 90% discount which is charged via CC Autopay.

Until 2021, the system gave 100% discounts to registered cars which emit 75 g/km or less of carbon dioxide and meet the Euro 5 emission standard, vehicles with nine or more seats, motor-tricycles, two-wheeled motorcycles (and sidecars), mopeds, accredited breakdown companies, and roadside recovery vehicles. All-electric vehicles (BEVs) and eligible plug-in hybrid electric vehicles (PHEVs) qualify for a 100% congestion charge discount until 2026, when they will pay the full charge, with a 25% discount if registered for autopay. A plug-in electric drive vehicle qualifies if the vehicle is registered with the Driver and Vehicle Licensing Agency (DVLA) and has a fuel type of "electric", or alternatively, if the vehicle is a "plug-in hybrid" and is on the government's list of PHEVs eligible for the OLEV grant.

Wheelchair-accessible taxis and private hire vehicles (PHVs) are exempt from the charge; until April 2019 all PHVs were.

As of September 2025, TfL gave exemptions or discounts to the groups below:

| Group | Number |
|---|---|
| Blue badge | 186,066 |
| Cleaner vehicle discount | 74,104 |
| Resident | 17,021 |
| Fleet | 22,184 |
| 9+ seater | 4,485 |
| Recovery vehicle | 170 |
| Motor tricycles | 557 |
| Selected partner | 136 |
| Accredited breakdown | 38 |

==== End of greener vehicle discount ====
In November 2012, TfL presented a proposal to end the greener vehicle discount that benefited mainly vehicles with small diesel engines, that avoid the charge because their engines produce emissions of less than 100 g/km of CO_{2}. The proposal was approved by Mayor Boris Johnson in April 2013 and the ultra low emission discount (ULED) went into effect on 1 July 2013. The ULED introduced more stringent emission standards that limit the free access to the congestion charge zone to all-electric cars, some plug-in hybrids, and any car or van that emits 75 g/km or less of CO_{2} and meets the Euro 5 emission standards for air quality. As of July 2013, there are no internal combustion-only vehicles that meet these criteria. The measure was designed to curb the growing number of diesel vehicles on London's roads. About 20,000 owners of vehicles registered for the greener vehicle discount by June 2013 were granted a three-year sunset period before they have to pay the full congestion charge. Other changes were the removal of the option to pay the charge in shops, and the penalty charge was increased to £10. The sunset period ended on 24 June 2016. In December 2018, a further tightening of the standards was announced, in part to bring standards beyond that of the ULEZ. This means that since April 2019 only vehicles which are Euro 6, emit up to 75 g/km of CO_{2} and have a minimum 20-mile (32 km) zero emission range have qualified for the discount. A further phase from October 2021 will mean that only zero-emission vehicles (pure electric vehicles and hydrogen fuel cell vehicles) can qualify, and the discount will be phased out completely from December 2025.

==== T-Charge emissions surcharge ====
An emissions surcharge, known as the toxicity charge or T-Charge, was introduced on 23 October 2017. It operated for the same hours as the congestion charge (7:00 am to 6:00 pm on weekdays). Older cars and vans that did not meet Euro 4 standards had to pay an extra £10 charge on top of the congestion charge to drive in central London, within the congestion charge zone (CCZ). The charge typically applied to diesel and petrol vehicles registered before 2006, and the levy affected up to 10,000 vehicles. The public consultation on the T-Charge proposals began in July 2016.

London Mayor Sadiq Khan announced the introduction of the scheme on 17 February 2017 after London achieved record air pollution levels in January 2017, and the city was put on a high pollution alert for the first time ever, as cold and stationary weather failed to clear toxic pollutants emitted mainly by diesel vehicles.

In December 2017, TfL said that the charge had cut the number of non-compliant vehicles by around 1,000 per day, with the remaining 2,000 paying the £10 charge (a further 3,000 vehicles are eligible for discounts due to Blue Badges etc.).

The T-Charge was replaced by the ultra low emission zone (ULEZ) on 8 April 2019. For the ULEZ sunset period the T-Charge was still levied for uncompliant vehicles on holders of the residents' discount.

==== Ultra Low Emission Zone ====
The ULEZ went into effect in April 2019 and replaced the T-Charge. It initially covered the same area as the T-Charge and the Congestion Charge Zone but applies 24/7, every day of the year (except Christmas Day), with charges of £12.50 a day for cars, vans and motorcycles, and £100 a day for lorries, buses and coaches. The ULEZ caused a 20% reduction in emissions and resulted in a drop of non compliant vehicles entering the zone each day from 35,578 to 23,054. The zone was extended to the North Circular and South Circular roads in October 2021 and was extended to the whole of Greater London from 29 August 2023.

=== Suspensions, avoidance and evasion ===
TfL can and does suspend the congestion charge either in a small local area to cope with incidents and if directed to do so by a police officer. The congestion charge was suspended on 7 and 8 July 2005 in response to the terrorist attacks on London Transport. The congestion charge was also suspended on 2 February 2009, in response to an extreme weather event (heavy snowfall) in the London area.

Although avoidance has become more sophisticated, compliance with the scheme and terms of payment has improved over the last few years, as is evidenced by the income from penalties dropping by approximately a quarter between 2005 and 2007. However, even after charges were increased, enforcement charges still made up a significant proportion (42–48%) of total revenues.

The 2008 annual report on the operation of the scheme shows that around 26% of penalties go unpaid, because the notice is cancelled on appeal or the amount cannot be recovered, for example if the registered keeper of the vehicle cannot be traced, has died, or is bankrupt.

Several newspapers have reported about the use of copied number plates to avoid the congestion charge, resulting in vehicle owners receiving penalty notices for failure to pay when their vehicles have not been inside the zone. Numbers known to be copied are stored in a database and trigger alerts, including police vehicle ANPR camera alerts, when observed in use.

=== Payment by embassies ===
Following pressure from the Mayor of London, an increasing number of embassies accepted the charge and by 2008 a total of 99 out of 128 embassies had agreed to the charge. Among others, decliners include Germany, Japan, Russia and the United States, who, by 2015, collectively owed £95 million. The United States and Germany are reported to consider it to be a local tax, from which they are protected by the Vienna Convention, rather than a toll.

In May 2011, Johnson raised the issue with the President of the United States, Barack Obama, against whom a fine of £120 was issued after driving through London in the Presidential state car without paying the toll during a state visit to Buckingham Palace. The United States subsequently claimed diplomatic immunity. A TfL spokesperson noted that US embassies do pay tolls in Oslo and Singapore. In 2024 Transport for London estimated that, by the end of 2023, £143 million was owed by foreign embassies in London: since the charge was introduced in 2003, the US Embassy owed the most with £14.6 million, followed by legations of Japan at £10 million, India with £8.5 million, and Nigeria with £8.4 million.

== History ==
=== Background ===
The government's Smeed Report of 1964 was the first full assessment of the practicality of road pricing in a British city on the basis of congestion. It recommended a method of "car user restraint" by a variable system of charging for road usage – if the government had the will to do so. During the early years of the Greater London Council, which was formed in 1965, the first plans were drawn up for a system of cordon charging or supplementary licensing for use in the central area. A formal study was undertaken into the merits of the scheme, and in 1973 concluded that it would improve traffic and environmental conditions in the centre. These plans were being developed at the same time as the London Ringways, a series of four orbital motorways around and within London including Ringway 1 (the London Motorway Box) leading to widespread public protest by Homes before Roads and others. Only a small section of these road schemes had been implemented by the time Labour gained control in the 1973 Greater London Council elections, and the new administration abandoned the road building plans in favour of public transport and traffic management. The new administration, to which Ken Livingstone had just been elected for the first time, studied a congestion scheme similar to the one which was eventually adopted the following year.

=== Planning and preparation ===
In 1995, the London Congestion Research Programme concluded that the city's economy would benefit from a congestion charge scheme, the Road Traffic Reduction Act 1997 required local authorities to study and reduce traffic volumes and any future London mayors were given the power to introduce "Road user charging" by the Greater London Authority Act 1999. In his manifesto for the 2000 London Mayoral election, Ken Livingstone had proposed to introduce a £5 charge for vehicles entering central London.

Following his victory, the Mayor made a draft order and requested a report from TfL, which summarised the reasons for introducing the scheme. The scheme was to be introduced to reduce congestion in the centre of the capital following the Draft Transport Strategy of January 2001 which had highlighted the importance that the Mayor placed on tackling this issue. The charge was to be part of a series of measures to improve the transport system in London and was to combined with public transport improvements and increased enforcement of parking and traffic regulations. The report stated that the scheme was expected to be the most effective in reducing through traffic, reducing congestion both within and outside the zone, improving the speed of buses and the quality of life in central London. It was stated that improved traffic flows would make London more attractive to business investment. Substantial net revenues were anticipated, which were to be invested in London's transport system. It also states that 90% of those who responded to a consultation on the scheme, viewed reducing traffic congestion in central London as 'important'.

In July 2002, Westminster City Council launched a legal challenge against the plans, arguing that they would increase pollution and were a breach of human rights of residents on the boundary of the zone. The High Court rejected the claim. The London Ambulance Service (LAS) anticipated increased volumes of traffic around the edge of the zone and an increase in demand within the zone, that might both adversely affect clinical outcomes.

Before the charge's introduction, there were fears of a very chaotic few days as people got used to the new situation. Indeed, Ken Livingstone, then Mayor of London and key proponent of the charge, himself predicted a "difficult few days" and a "bloody day".

On introduction, the scheme was the largest ever undertaken by a capital city.

=== Introduction (February 2003) ===
The charge was introduced on 17 February 2003 covering the approximate area of the London Inner Ring Road. Starting at the northernmost point and moving clockwise, the major roads defining the boundary were Pentonville Road, City Road, Old Street, Commercial Street, Mansell Street, Tower Bridge Road, New Kent Road, Elephant and Castle, Vauxhall Bridge Road, Park Lane, Edgware Road, Marylebone Road and Euston Road (other roads filled the small gaps between these roads). The zone therefore included the whole of the City of London, the financial district, and the West End, London's primary commercial and entertainment centre.

On the launch date of the original zone, an extra 300 buses (out of a total of around 8,000) were introduced. Bus and London Underground managers reported that buses and tubes were a little, if at all, busier than normal.

Originally, Capita Group maintained the system under a five-year contract worth around £230m. Having been threatened with the termination of the contract by Ken Livingstone, then Mayor of London, for poor performance, when the zone was subsequently extended, Capita was awarded an extension to the original contract up until February 2009 to cover the expanded zone. Capita employed sub-contractors including India-based Mastek, who were responsible for much of the Information Technology infrastructure. Due to the wide spread of sub-contractors around the world and due to varying data protection regulations in different countries, the scheme had prompted concerns about privacy.

=== Immediate impact ===
On the first day 190,000 vehicles moved into or within the zone during charging hours, a decrease of around 25% on normal traffic levels, partly due to it also being the half-term school holiday. A report from the Bow Group stated that historically, London congestion is at its worst during the morning rush hour, and that the early days of congestion charging had little impact on that critical time, the main effect occurring after 11:00 am. Just over 100,000 motorists paid the charge personally, 15–20,000 were fleet vehicles paying under fleet arrangements, and it was believed around 10,000 liable motorists did not pay the due charge.

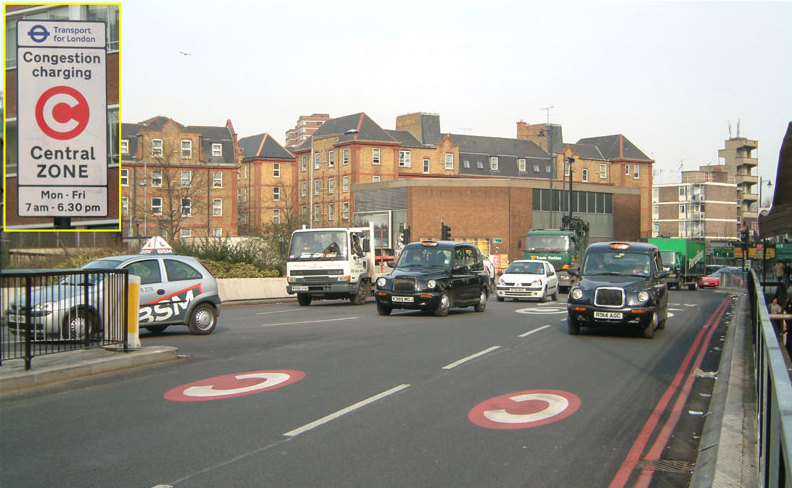
Street markings and a sign (inset) that alert drivers entering the charge zone at Old Street. The sign displays the original operating hours for the scheme.

Initial suggestions that school holidays were responsible for part of the traffic drop during the first week of operation of the charge were confirmed when traffic rose again by 5% following the return to school at the beginning of the second week of the charge. Reports indicated that, over the first month or so of operation, traffic was consistently down at least 15% on pre-charge levels, with the second week seeing the reduction drop to 20%.

The AA Motoring Trust suggested that changes to the timing of traffic lights and the end of major road works had also impacted congestion.

The effect of the congestion charge zone on local businesses is a contested issue. The TfL estimates that the effect on business has been overall neutral. However the effect on business differs significantly between stores. Some shops and businesses are reported to be heavily affected by the charge, both in terms of lost sales due to reduced traffic and increased delivery costs, as recognised by the London Chamber of Commerce. In August 2003, the John Lewis Partnership, a large department store, announced that in the first six months of the charge's operation, sales at their Oxford Street store fell by 7.3% whilst sales at other stores in the Greater London area but outside the Congestion Charge Zone rose by 1.7%. To partly compensate for the loss of revenue they extended opening hours and introduced regular Sunday opening for the first time. However London First's own report indicated that business was broadly supportive. Subsequently, another report stated that there had been a reduction in some employment in the charging zone. TfL criticised the reports as unrepresentative and that its own statistics reported no effect on business.

After the introduction of the charge, there were a number of suggestions for its future. Soon after charging commenced, Livingstone announced that he would carry out a formal review of the charge's success or failure six months after its introduction – brought forward from one year, following the smooth start. On 25 February 2003 Livingstone stated, "I can't conceive of any circumstances in the foreseeable future where we would want to change the charge, although perhaps ten years down the line it may be necessary" referring to the amount that drivers have to pay, indicating that £5 was sufficient to bring about the reduction in traffic that he had hoped for.

The London Assembly Budget Committee 2003 report on the company criticised the contract with Capita as not providing value for money. It was reported in July 2003 that TfL agreed to subsidise Capita by paying it £31 million because it was making no profits from the project, and that the most critical problem was the 103,000 outstanding penalty notices not paid.

On 23 October 2003 TfL published a report reviewing the first six months of the charge. The report's main findings were that the average number of cars and delivery vehicles entering the central zone was 60,000 fewer than the previous year. Around 50–60% of this reduction was attributed to transfers to public transport, 20–30% to journeys avoiding the zone, 15–25% switching to car share, and the remainder to reduced number of journeys, more travelling outside the hours of operation, and increased use of motorbikes and bicycles. Journey times were found to have been reduced by 14%. Variation in journey time for a particular route repeated on many occasions also decreased. The report also claimed that although the charge was responsible for about 4,000 fewer people visiting the zone daily, that the charge was responsible for only a small fraction of the 7% drop in retail sales reported. The report also stated that around 100,000 penalty fines were issued each month, of which about 2,000 were contested. By comparison, the initial seven-month trial in 2006 of the Stockholm congestion tax in the Swedish capital saw an average 25% reduction in traffic numbers.

In November 2003, Scientific American magazine listed Ken Livingstone as one of the top 50 visionaries building a better world and who were considered to have contributed most to science and technology during the year. They praised the mayor for his "guts and leadership" in introducing the charge which had reduced traffic and his "courage" in combating a classic case of externality, i.e. "the exploitation of common resources by some people at the expense of others". They noted that other cities were now considering similar projects.

=== 2004 election campaign ===
In February, shortly before the June 2004 mayoral election TfL issued a consultation document on the expansion of the zone to the west that would cover the rest (western portion) of Westminster and the Royal Borough of Kensington and Chelsea. The proposed extension was to cover around 230,000 residents, compared with the 150,000 in the original zone.

Steven Norris, the Conservative Party candidate for mayor in 2004, has been a fierce critic of the charge, branding it the "Kengestion charge" (a blend of Ken Livingstone and Congestion). A few days before the scheme came into operation, he wrote in a BBC report that it had been "shambolically organised", that the public transport network had insufficient spare capacity to cater for travellers deterred from using their cars in the area by the charge. Further, he said that the scheme would affect poorer sections of society more than the rich, with the daily charge being the same for all, regardless of vehicle size. He pledged to scrap it if he became mayor in June 2004 and said he would grant an amnesty to anyone with an outstanding fine for non-payment of the charge.

The Liberal Democrat candidate, Simon Hughes, however, supported the basic principles of the scheme. Amongst some of the changes he proposed were changing the end time from 6:30 pm to 5:00 pm and automatically giving all vehicles five free days each year so as not to affect occasional visitors.

=== Preparing for the Western Extension ===
In August 2004, following Livingstone's re-election, the results of the consultation on the Western Extension were published which showed that a substantial majority of respondents did not want the extension; however, Livingstone said he was going ahead and that the polls were a "charade" which did not diminish his electoral mandate. "A consultation is not a referendum" he said. Protests continued against the extension, with residents arguing that only 5% of the road space in the selected area was congested. Following on in May 2005 a further TfL consultation began with specific proposals about the extensions. These included a plan to reduce the operating hours of the charge by half-an-hour to "boost trade at London's theatres, restaurants and cinemas".

In October 2004, TfL stated that only seven of the 13 government aims for London transport would be met by 2010. The target on reducing congestion for Greater London overall will not be met, the report said.

By November 2004, Livingstone directly contradicted his belief that the charge would not be raised, saying: "I have always said that during this term [his second term in office] it will go up to at least £6." By the end of the month, Livingstone announced that, in fact, the rise would be to £8 for private vehicles and £7 for commercial traffic. Business groups such as London First said following the announcement that the charges were "totally unsatisfactory and unacceptable". The rise to £8 was announced formally on 1 April 2005, along with discounts for drivers buying month or year-long tickets. On 10 May 2006, in a live TV debate, Livingstone supported a rise in the charge to £10 by 2008.

A report in May 2005 stated that the number of shoppers had declined by 7% year-on-year in March, 8% in April and 11% in the first two weeks of May. TfL countered that an economic downturn, the SARS outbreak and threat of terrorism were likely factors. At the same time, a London Chamber of Commerce report indicated that 25% of businesses were planning on relocation following the charge's introduction. However, an independent report six months after the charge was implemented suggested that businesses were then supporting the charge. London First commissioned the study which reported that 49% of businesses felt the scheme was working and only 16% that it was failing. The Fourth Annual Review by TfL in 2004 indicated that business activity within the charge zone had been higher in both productivity and profitability and that the charge had a "broadly neutral impact" on the London-wide economy. The Fifth Annual Review continued to show the central congestion zone outperforming the wider London economy.

In May 2005, businessman Miguel Camacho set up fivepounds.co.uk (referring to the then-current pricing), whose sole function was to sign up private drivers to their "fleet", thus offering the convenience of not having to pay the charge pro-actively, avoiding fines in the case of a forgotten journey and also potentially getting a "free journey" if undetected by the cameras. TfL moved quickly to quash the loophole, by demanding that fleet operators provide the registration document for each vehicle in their fleet. Fivepounds went out of business on 26 February 2006.

The June 2005 increase in charges by 60% only resulted in a relatively small rise in revenues, as there were fewer penalty payments. The anticipated start-up costs of the Western extension were £125 million with operating costs of £33 million; expected gross revenues were expected to be £80 million, resulting in net revenues of £50 million.

In 2005, the Liberal Democrats claimed that Capita had been fined £4.5 million for missing the targets set for the congestion charge, that was equivalent to £7,400 for every day that the charge had existed.

At the end of September 2005, London Mayor Ken Livingstone confirmed the western expansion of the congestion charge, which came into effect on 19 February 2007. It was expected that the extension would increase congestion in the zone by around 5% as the 60,000 residents in the new zone will be entitled to the discounts available. Several roads were also to be left charge-free between the original zone and the extension.

In 2005, The Guardian obtained documentation under the Freedom of Information Act 2000 which showed that out of 65,534 penalty tickets issued to non UK-registered vehicles, only 1,993 had been paid.

TfL ran a six-month trial of "tag and beacon" (transponder) from February 2006 to replace the camera-based system. This uses an electronic card affixed to the windscreen of a vehicle and can be used to produce "smart tolls" where charges can be varied dependent on time and direction of travel. This system automatically deducts the charge so that the 50,000 drivers a year who forget to pay the fine would not be penalised. TfL has suggested that this scheme could be introduced from 2009.

Shortly before it was introduced, the Centre for Economics and Business Research (CEBR) predicted that the West London extension would cause 6,000 job losses. This was later contested by the Greater London Authority economist unit in a report, arguing the CEBR results were "unfounded".

=== Introduction of the Western Extension ===
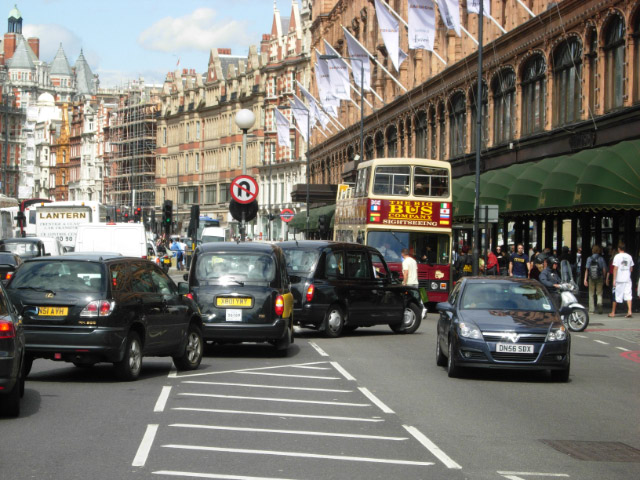
Traffic congestion on the Brompton Road outside Harrods (part of the A4). This road was part of the extended congestion charge zone.

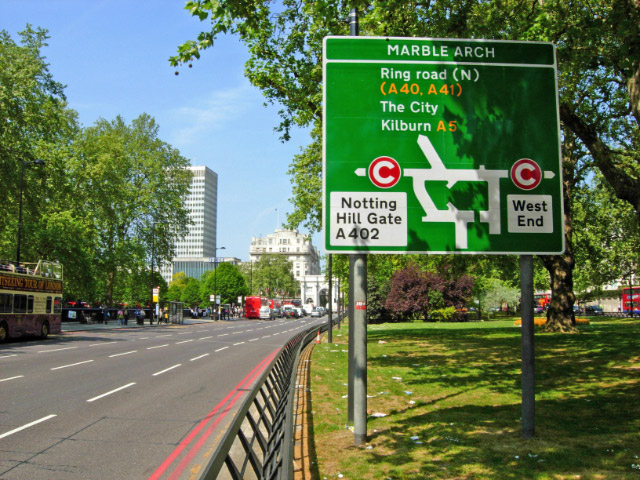
Park Lane was one of the new free through routes during the existence of the Western Extension.

The boundary of the zone, as of 19 February 2007, started at the northern end of Vauxhall Bridge and (travelling in a clockwise direction) heads along the northern bank of the River Thames as Grosvenor Road, the Chelsea Embankment and Cheyne Walk. From there, it heads north, along the eastern edges of the Kensington and Earl's Court one-way systems, part of the A3220, with the roads in between charged, before continuing to the A40 Westway as the Holland Road and the West Cross Route. The boundary then includes parts of North Kensington, but the actual boundary is defined by the West London Line railway track, which runs between Latimer Road (inside the zone) and Wood Lane (outside the zone), until Scrubs Lane, before turning east, following the Great Western Main Line out of Paddington towards Ladbroke Grove. Here, the boundary followed the Grand Union Canal and rejoined the existing zone at Edgware Road after skirting Paddington, by way of the Bishop's Bridge Road, Eastbourne Terrace, Praed Street and Sussex Gardens.

The Western Extension was officially removed from the charging zone beginning 4 January 2011, with charging on the Western extension effectively ended on 24 December 2010 and enacted during the week of Christmas to New Year holiday period.

TfL provided some free through routes, where drivers do not have to pay the charge. The main route was defined by the western boundary of the original zone Vauxhall Bridge Road, Grosvenor Place, Park Lane and Edgware Road, with some additions around Victoria. To the north, the through route is the Marylebone Road, Euston Road and Pentonville Road. The Westway flyover at the eastern end is the other exempt route even though it cuts across the north-west corner of the zone.

In May 2007, a survey of 150 local businesses stated they had seen an average drop in business of 25% following the introduction of the charge. TfL disputed the findings, stating that there had been "no overall effect" on business and that it had outperformed the rest of the UK in the central zone during 2006.

In 2007 a green motoring website alleged to TfL that owners of luxury cars were registering their vehicles as minicabs to qualify for exemption from the charge. Registering a vehicle as a minicab costs £82 plus £27 per year licence fee, much less than the congestion charge. TfL responded that it carried out regular checks to confirm that cars were being used for the purposes they were registered for, and that they had not discovered any such cases.

Transport for London consulted on a charge for the Blackwall Tunnel in east London, but these proposals were suspended in November 2007 following significant opposition from the public. Former Mayor Ken Livingstone has stated that he had "absolutely no plans to set up a congestion charging zone to charge vehicles that use the Blackwall Tunnel or the Blackwall Tunnel Approach Road. But if Greenwich wishes to do so on any of its roads then I will support them".

=== Proposed CO_{2} emissions based charging ===
In 2006 mayor Ken Livingstone proposed variable charges based on CO_{2} emission rate Vehicle Excise Duty bands. Charges would be reduced or eliminated for Band A vehicles, but would be increase it to up to £25 a day for the most polluting Band G vehicles. Consultation on these proposals began in August 2007 and ended on 19 October 2007. On 12 February 2008 TfL announced that they would introduce a new charging structure for vehicles entering the congestion zone, based on potential CO_{2} emission rates on 27 October 2008 following the imminent mayoral elections. The main change would be the introduction of two new fees:

- £25 per day (with no residents' discount) for cars which, if first registered on or after 1 March 2001 are rated in Vehicle Excise Duty (VED) "Band G" (emitting above 225g/km of CO_{2}), or if first registered before 1 March 2001 have an engine capacity of greater than 3000 cc and for pickups with two rows of seats which either are rated as emitting above 225g/km of CO_{2} or which have an engine capacity of greater than 3000 cc. In Alistair Darling's 2008 budget it was announced that VED Band G would be lowered to 151g/km of CO_{2}. TfL had not clarified whether the £25 daily charge would be linked to the band until the point became moot as the scheme was cancelled.
- £0 per day (a 100% discount) for cars that either are rated as emitting less than 100g/km CO_{2} and which meet the Euro 5 air pollution emissions standard or which are rated as emitting no more than 120g/km CO_{2} and which appear on the PowerShift register.

According to a report commissioned by Land Rover, the scheme would increase traffic delays and air pollution. Porsche announced they intended to request a judicial review, claiming that the new charges were disproportionate and would make no "meaningful difference" to the environment. Acting director of the RAC Sheila Raingner commented that "The congestion charge was originally developed to reduce congestion and that the changes would confuse the public and reduce support and trust for future initiatives."

At the request of Porsche, King's College released the full report of the possible effects of the new system that was originally commissioned by Transport for London which indicated that the proposed new system would reduce CO_{2} emissions in central London by 2,200 tonnes by 2012, but would increase CO_{2} emissions by 182,000 tonnes in outer London, due to drivers of more polluting vehicles avoiding congestion charge zones. A spokesman Transport for London stated that the methodology used by King's was "less robust and accurate than TfL's methodology" and that their findings suggested reductions of up to 5,000 tonnes of CO_{2} by 2009. They claimed that King's College agreed with these results and were making revisions to their report.

=== 2008 mayoral election ===
The congestion charge remained an issue during the run up to the 2008 mayoral election. Boris Johnson, the Conservative Party candidate said he would look at a graduated charging scheme, would consult on whether to reduce the size of the charging zone and would not introduce the proposed emissions based charging system. Brian Paddick, the Liberal Democrat candidate, suggested exempting delivery vehicles from the charge. Johnson was elected and immediately announced that the emissions based charges would not be implemented.

=== Johnson administration ===
Following his election, Johnson announced that the CO_{2} emissions based charging would not go ahead, saying "I am delighted that we have been able to scrap the £25 charge, which would have hit families and small businesses hardest. I believe the proposal would actually have made congestion worse by allowing thousands of small cars in for free". Porsche announced that they had been successful in the high court and had been awarded their legal costs which would run to "a six-figure sum". Their managing director said: "The charge was clearly unfair and was actually going to increase emissions in London... Porsche is proud to have played a decisive role in striking down such a blatantly political tax increase targeting motorists."

Johnson also announced that he would review the Western Extension following a public consultation planned for September 2008. Having held this consultation with residents he announced that the extension would be removed by 2010. Out of 28,000 people who responded to the consultation, 67% of the respondents, including 86% of businesses, said they wanted the extended zone removed.

On 20 October 2010, TfL announced that Western Extension would formally be removed on 4 January 2011, noting that charging on the Western Extension would in practice end on 24 December 2010 at the start of the Christmas break. Other changes implemented on 4 January 2011 included an increase of the charge to £10 if paid in advance or on the day and to £12 if paid by midnight the charging day after travel, with a reduced charge of £9 for people who sign up to CC Autopay (with a £10 registration fee) which allowed users to nominate up to five vehicles with all fees being automatically debited from a nominated bank account at the end of each month.

In the lead-up to the 2012 London mayoral election Johnson announced that he would give the Metropolitan Police access to cameras used to monitor vehicles travelling in the London congestion charge zone and the region-wide low emission zone, to help detect crime and would ensure that automatic number-plate recognition (ANPR) was used "across all London" to help track down the vehicles of criminals. Ken Livingstone said he would freeze the congestion charge for 4 years. The election was won by Johnson.

=== 2020 ===
In 2020, the congestion charge was suspended from 23 March to 18 May in order to facilitate travel around the city for critical workers during the COVID-19 pandemic. NHS and care workers are exempt from the charge.

The congestion charge became controversial again with the proposed expansion of the charge to the Greater London area. Critics cite the charge's failure to reduce congestion, and see the charge as a tax on those living close to London.

On 22 June 2020 measures intended to be temporary were introduced under the terms of Transport for London's £1.6bn rescue package from the government, with the charge rising to £15 a day and being extended from 5 to 7 days a week. The measures remained in force—with an additional increase—in the proposed changes for 2026.

== Effects ==
A number of studies have been made of its effects on congestion, traffic levels, road safety, the use of public transport, the environment, and business activity matters.

One such study concluded that these effects cannot be causally attributed to the congestion charge, as the trends in these factors began before the introduction of the congestion charge, and continued largely unchanged after the introduction of the charge.

=== Traffic changes ===
==== Traffic volume ====
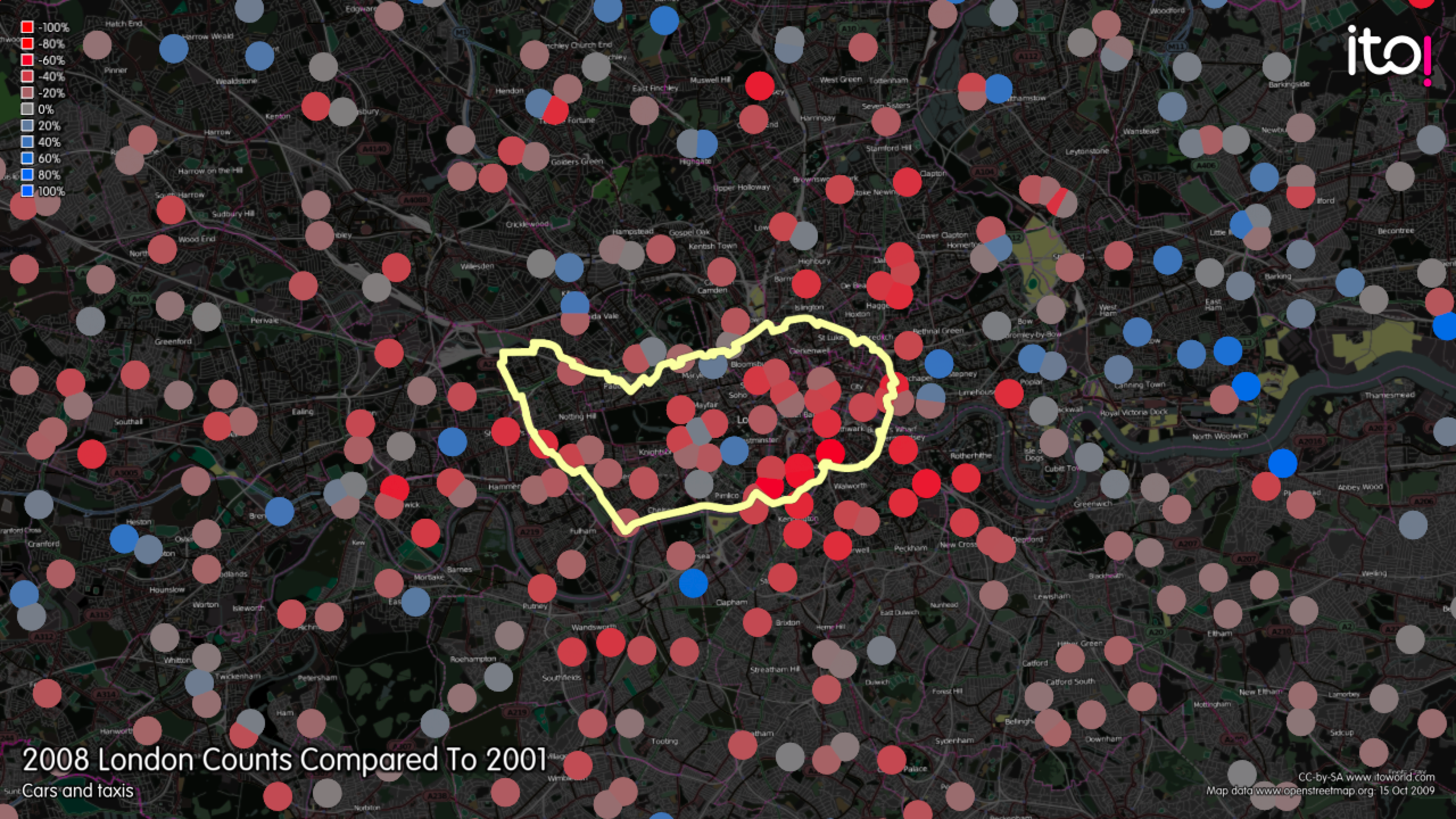
Changes in the counts of cars and taxis in London at October 2008 compared to October 2001. Red dots show reductions and blue dots increases. The boundary of the congestion charge is shown in yellow.

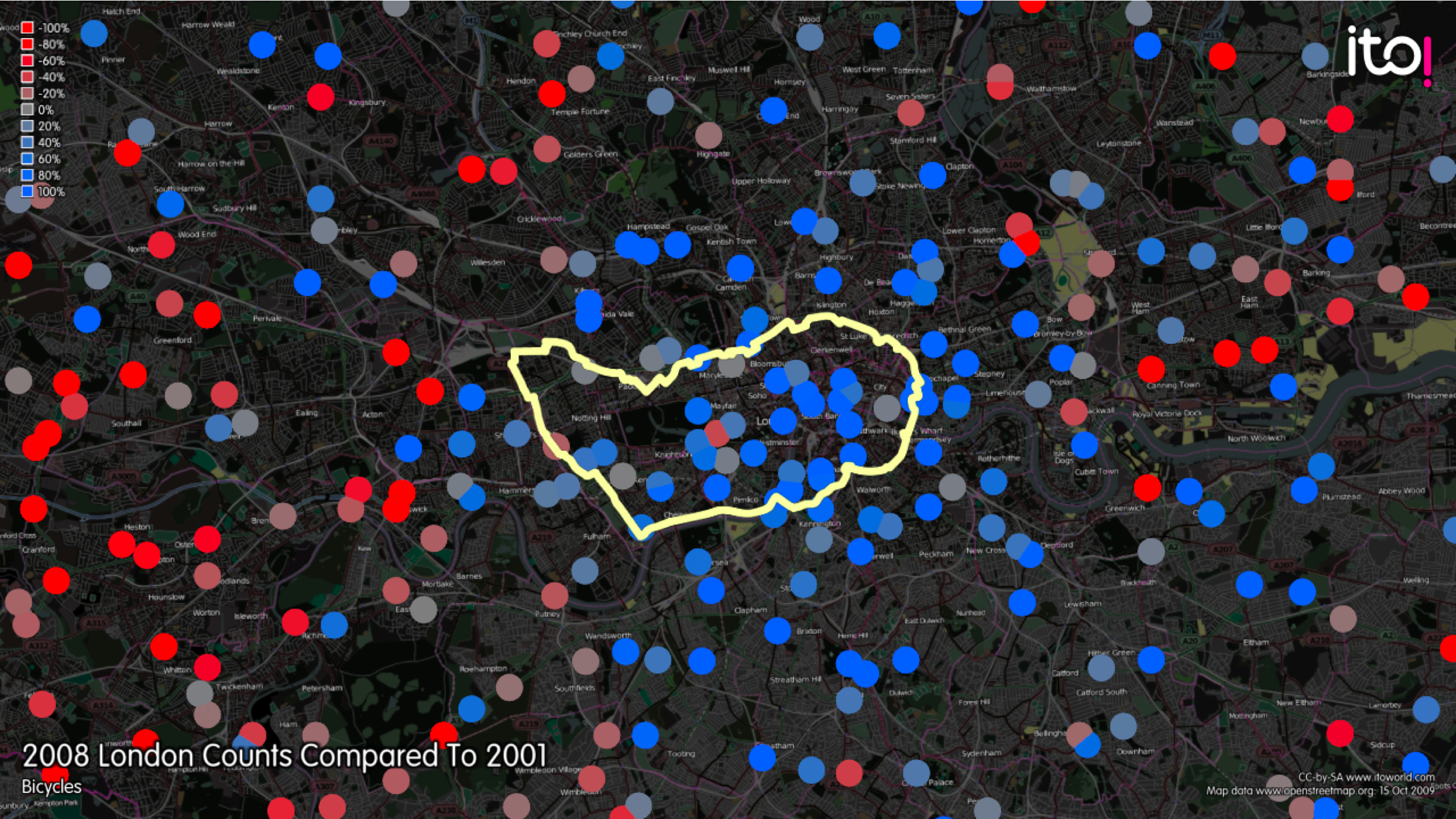
Changes in the counts of bicycles at October 2008 compared to October 2001. Red dots show reductions and blue dots increases.

A year before the congestion zone, TfL set up automatic traffic counters and augmented them with regular classified traffic counts at key locations, to monitor flows.

TfL's report in June 2007 found that the number of chargeable vehicles entering the zone had reduced by 30% (primarily cars and minicabs, although vans and lorries had decreased by 13%), while there were overall increases in the numbers of taxis, buses, and especially bicycles. The daily profile of traffic flows had changed, with less traffic after 9:30 am and a peak immediately before and after the end of the charging period. The level of traffic entering the zone during the morning peak had not reduced as much as at other times. The overall level of traffic of all vehicle types entering the central Congestion Charge Zone was consistently 16% lower in 2006 than the pre-charge levels in 2002. Year on year, counts of inbound traffic approaching the zone had also seen a distinct and significant 5–7% decline in the number of chargeable vehicles, which was unexplained. They had noted a small but pervasive long-term trend of less traffic entering the zone, expected to be a result of people changing their location and lifestyle, perhaps influenced by the charge. The conservative Bow Group noted that the main effect occurred after 11 am.

Once within the charging zone car and delivery traffic remained unchanged, suggesting that the journeys made by residents and businesses within the zone were broadly unaffected. Changes to the road network over the years has made direct comparisons difficult, but TfL suspect that certain routes used heavily by taxis and buses within the zone have seen substantially increased traffic. On some of the boundary roads traffic numbers had increased slightly but congestion and delays were largely unchanged from 2002 levels.

Following the introduction of the Western Extension, TfL stated that traffic had fallen around 10 to 15% in the extended zone. The original zone showed a 4% increase in congestion, following expansion of the congestion charging area and the introduction of discounts extended to residents of the new zone and buffer zone. TfL assessed the increase in charges in 2005 to have had only a slight impact overall.

In February 2013, ten years after the scheme introduction, TfL reported a 10% reduction in traffic levels from baseline conditions. TfL assessed that the scheme has had a significant impact in shifting people away from using cars, contributing to an overall reduction of 11% in vehicle kilometres in London between 2000 and 2012.

A 2024 study found that the congestion charge reduced traffic in downtown London, as well as on untolled suburban roads leading downtown. The study found that the charge had a progressive impact, as low-skill commuters in the suburbs benefitted from less traffic.

==== Traffic speeds ====
The charge operates for under one third of the hours in a year and covers around two-thirds of the central London traffic. In total 8% of traffic kilometres (miles) are affected by the scheme. TfL have extrapolated the trends in road speed in the congestion zone; they have suggested that speeds would have dropped from 17 km/h (10 mph) in 2003 to 11.5 km/h (7 mph) by 2006, had the scheme not been put in place.

A report by TfL in early 2007 indicated that there were 2.27 traffic delays per kilometre (3.65 per mile) in the original charging zone. This compared with a figure of 2.3 per kilometre (3.7 per mile) before the introduction of the congestion charge. After the scheme was introduced they had measured an improvement in journey times of 0.7 minutes per km (1.1 per mile), or 30%. This improvement had decreased to 22% in 2006, and during 2006 congestion levels had increased so that the improvement, compared to the year before the scheme, was just 7%. TfL explained this as a result of changes to road priorities within the zone, delays caused by new pedestrian and road user safety schemes, and, most particularly, a doubling of road works in the latter half of 2006. Utilities were encouraged to complete planned road works in the year preceding the congestion charge, so it would appear that the first year of measurement used for later comparisons would also have been affected by streetworks to some extent.

TfL reported in January 2014, that despite a reduction of traffic volume within London, traffic speeds have also been getting progressively slower over the past decade, particularly in central London. TfL explains that the historic decline in traffic speeds is most likely due to interventions that have reduced the effective capacity of the road network to improve the urban environment, increase road safety and prioritise public transport, pedestrian and cycle traffic, as well as an increase in road works by utilities and general development activity since 2006. This explains the lower levels of congestion reduction compared to the pre-charge baseline: 8% in 2006, compared to 30% in 2004. Since 2006 this trend towards slower traffic movement has ceased and traffic speeds have remained more stable, as evidenced by GPS satellite tracking data from 2006 to 2012. Indicators of excess delay or congestion also suggest a stable overall picture, with some improvements in the past two years. TfL concludes that while levels of congestion in central London are close to pre-charging levels, the effectiveness of the congestion charge in reducing traffic volumes means that conditions would be worse without the Congestion Charging scheme.

=== Air quality ===
The pre-commencement report from TfL noted that the scheme was not expected to significantly affect air quality, but that offering a discount to encourage the use of greener fuels would be a positive measure.

TfL reported that levels of nitrogen oxides (NO_{X}), fell by 13.4% between 2002 and 2003, and carbon dioxide, as well as the levels of airborne particulates (PM10) within and alongside the Inner Ring Road boundary of the zone.

Since 2002, the nitrogen dioxide (NO_{2}) produced by diesel exhaust has become a serious problem, with the London Air Quality Network of Imperial College reporting that the annual mean NO_{2} objective (of 40 μgm-3 or 21 ppb) was exceeded at all kerbside and roadside monitoring sites across central and greater London during 12 months between 2005 and 2006. Although no areas within the Congestion Charge Zone reported NO_{2} levels above an upper limit of 200 μgm-3 (105 ppb), some monitoring areas near the zone boundary experienced very long periods at such levels, notably the A23 near Brixton (3741 hours) and the Marylebone Road (849 hours).

In 2007, the Fifth Annual Monitoring Report by TfL stated that between 2003 and 2006, NO_{X} emissions fell by 17%, PM10 by 24% and CO_{2} by 3%, with some being attributed to the effects of reduced levels of traffic flowing better, with the majority being as a result of improved vehicle technology. In total, the rate of fall in CO_{2} has been almost 20% as of 2007.

The 2007 TfL report makes it clear that only a one-off reduction of emissions could be expected from the introduction of the charge, whilst further reductions are unlikely to be as a result of the charge. It notes that lower vehicles emissions may not necessarily feed through into improvements in air quality as vehicle emissions are only one contributor to total emissions of a particular pollutant along industrial sources and that weather conditions play a significant role, and that pollutant concentrations were being affected by changes in the make up of the vehicle fleet. It also suggests that the rate of decline in certain pollutants is decreasing.

A 2011 independent study published by the Health Effects Institute (HEI), and led by a researcher from King's College London, found that there is little evidence the congestion charge scheme has improved air quality. This research used modelling and also compared actual air pollutant measurements within the congestion charge zone with those of control sites located in Outer London. The investigators concluded that "it is difficult to identify significant air quality improvements from a specific program – especially one targeted at a small area within a large city – against the backdrop of broader regional pollutant and weather changes." National trends had already shown a rapid decline of some other emissions during the late 1990s, notably carbon monoxide, and levels have been relatively stable since 2002 across London.

A 2020 study of London found that the London congestion charge led to reductions in pollution and reductions in driving, but it increased pollution from diesel taxis and buses (which are exempt from the charge).

| | Charging zone | | | Inner Ring Road | | |
| | NO_{X} | PM10 | CO_{2} | NO_{X} | PM10 | CO_{2} |
| Overall traffic emissions change 2003 versus 2002 | −13.4 | −15.5 | −16.4 | −6.9 | −6.8 | −5.4 |
| Overall traffic emissions change 2004 versus 2003 | −5.2 | −6.9 | −0.9 | −5.6 | −6.3 | −0.8 |
| Changes due to improved vehicle technology 2003-2006 | −17.3 | −23.8 | −3.4 | −17.5 | −20.9 | −2.4 |
Source: "Impacts Monitoring – Fourth Annual Report" (PDF). Transport for London. Archived (PDF) from the original on 29 April 2015. and "Impacts Monitoring – Fifth Annual Report" (PDF). Transport for London. June 2007. Archived (PDF) from the original on 22 January 2014. 2003–2004 figures are TfL estimates.

=== Public transport ===
On the launch date of the original zone, an extra 300 buses (out of a total of around 8,000) were introduced. Bus route changes have been made to take advantage of the presumed higher traffic speeds and the greater demand for public transport; route 452 was introduced and three others (routes 31, 46 and 430) were extended. The frequency of buses on other routes through the zone extension were also increased.

In 2007 TfL reported that bus patronage in the central London area (not the same as the Congestion Charge Zone) had increased from under 90,000 pre-charge to stabilise at 116,000 journeys per day by 2007. It also reported that usage of the Underground has increased by 1% above pre-charge levels, having fallen substantially in 2003–2004. They could not attribute any change in National Rail patronage to the introduction of the central zone charge.

=== Road safety ===
TfL estimated that the charge has led to a small reduction in road traffic casualties against a background trend of improvement across London and across the rest of Great Britain over the period. Cars and motorcycles have seen the biggest reduction in accidents, whereas bicyclists have seen a slight increase, which may reflect their increased numbers.

Of the reduction from 2,598 personal injury crashes inside the zone in the year before the scheme to 1,629 by 2005 TfL estimated that some 40 and 70 injuries may have been avoided annually due to the introduction of the charging zone, with most of the remaining reduction attributed to other changes to the road network favouring its people-moving capacity.

== Operations and technology ==
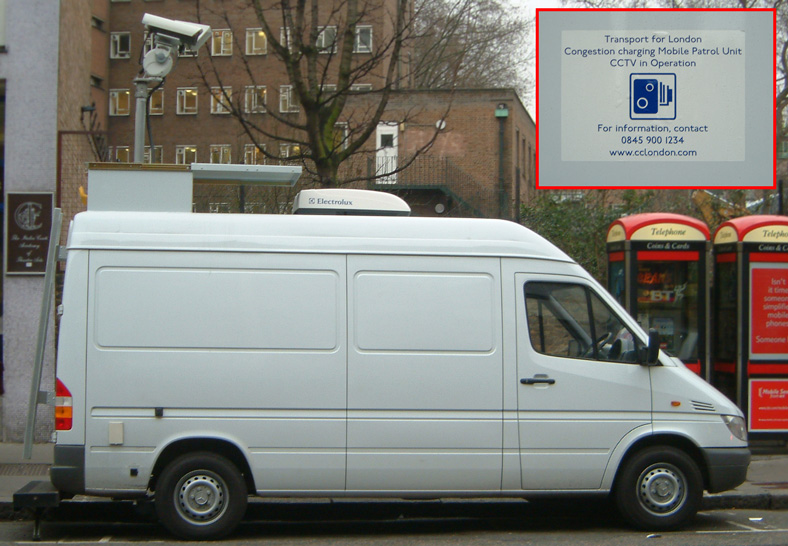
TfL congestion charging mobile patrol units use CCTV to identify vehicles within the charge zone.

Whilst TfL is responsible for the scheme, the operation is sub-contracted to a number of outside companies. Since 2009, IBM has been responsible for the day-to-day operation of the charging system, whilst Siemens Traffic Solutions provides and operates the physical enforcement infrastructure. Transport for London announced that from 2009 IBM would operate the charge, along with the London low emission zone under contract.

The scheme makes use of purpose-built automatic number-plate recognition (ANPR) cameras, manufactured by PIPs Technology, to record vehicles entering and exiting the zone. Cameras can record number plates with a 90% accuracy rate through the technology. The majority of vehicles within the zone are captured on camera. The cameras take two still pictures in colour and black and white and use infrared technology to identify the number plates. The camera network and other roadside equipment is managed largely automatically by an installation system developed by Roke Manor Research Ltd, which delivers number plates to the billing system. These identified numbers are checked against the list of payers overnight by computer. In those cases when a number plate has not been recognised then they are checked manually. Those that have paid but have not been seen in the central zone are not refunded, and those that have not paid and are seen are fined. The registered keeper of such a vehicle is looked up in a database provided by the Driver and Vehicle Licensing Agency (DVLA), based in Swansea.

== Income and costs ==
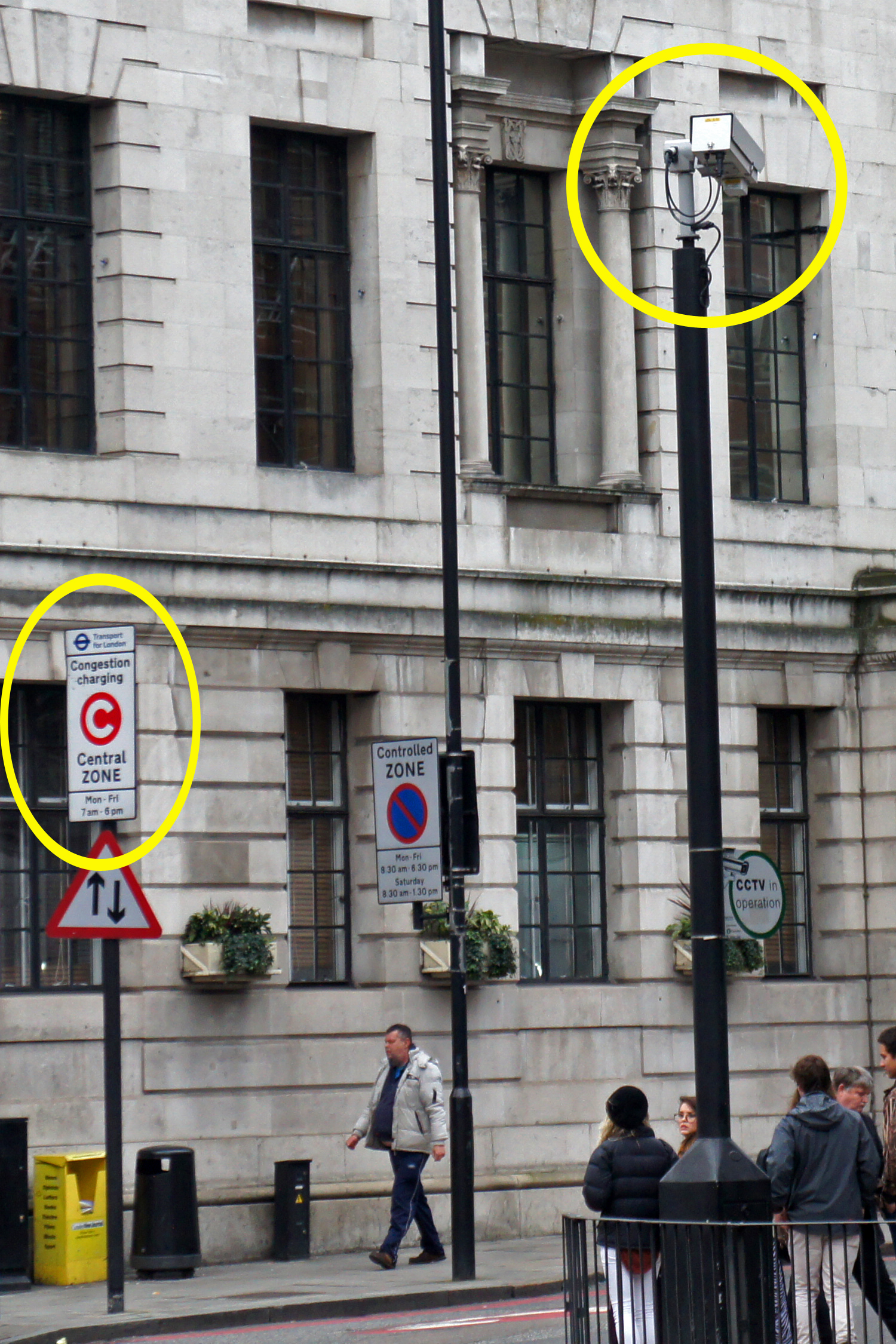
CCTV cameras used to monitor vehicles entering the congestion charge zone (CCZ) boundary.

TfL's annual report for 2017–18 shows that revenues from the congestion charge were £229.8m over the financial year, representing 4.3% of TfL's annual revenues. A quarter of this was spent on the cost of running the toll system, at £57.7 million. Once other charges were deducted, the congestion charge brought in an annual operating net income of £155.9m for TfL. This income compares with TfL's total revenue that year from bus and tube fares of £4.319 billion.

The initial operating revenues from the congestion charge did not reach the levels that were originally expected. Within six months of the start of the scheme, the reduction in traffic had been such that TfL were predicting a £65 million revenue shortfall.

By law, all surpluses raised must be reinvested into London's transport infrastructure; at the start of the scheme it was anticipated that this would be around £200 million. According to a report issued in February 2007, the initial costs of setting up the scheme were £161.7 million, with an annual operating cost of about £115m anticipated. Total revenues over the first three-and-a-half years had been £677.4 million, with TfL reporting a surplus over operating costs of £189.7 million. The Bow Group, using TfL data, estimated that by 2007 the project had only returned a modest £10 million profit.

Although Parliament has limited the amount that authorities can borrow, for some time it had been speculated that the regular income obtained from the congestion charge and other revenues could be used to securitise a bond issue that finances other transport projects across London. TfL issued their first bond for £200 million in 2005, to be repaid at 5% interest over 30 years. TfL plans to borrow £3.1 billion more to fund a five-year transport programme across London, including works on London Underground and road safety schemes.

| Revenues (£m) provisional | 2004/5 | 2005/6 | 2006/7 | 2007/8 | 2008/9 | 2009/10 | 2010/11 | 2011/12 | 2012/13 | 2013/14 | 2014/15 | 2015/16 | 2016/17 | 2017/2018 | 2018/2019 |
|---|---|---|---|---|---|---|---|---|---|---|---|---|---|---|---|
| Standard daily vehicle charges (currently £15) | 98 | 121 | 125 | 146 | not available | | | | | | | | | | |
| Enforcement income | 72 | 65 | 55 | 73 | not available | | | | | | | | | | |
| Fleet vehicle daily charges (currently £10.5) | 17 | 19 | 27 | 37 | not available | | | | | | | | | | |
| Resident vehicles (currently daily £1.05) | 2 | 2 | 6 | 12 | not available | | | | | | | | | | |
| Other income | | 2 | | | not available | | | | | | | | | | |
| Total revenues | 190 | 210 | 213 | 268 | 325.7 | 312.6 | 286.5 | 226.7 | 222.0 | 234.6 | 257.4 | 258.4 | 249.6 | 229.8 | 229.9 |
| Total operation and administration costs | (92) | (88) | (90) | (131) | (168.5) | (178.3) | (113) | (89.9) | (89.9) | (85.4) | (84.9) | (90.1) | (85.7) | (73.9) | (83.2) |
| Net revenues | 97 | 122 | 123 | 137 | 148.5 | 158.1 | 173.5 | 136.8 | 132.1 | 149.2 | 172.5 | 168.3 | 163.9 | 155.9 | 146.7 |

| Expenditure (% of operating revenue) | 2004–5 | 2006–7 |
|---|---|---|
| Bus network improvements (incl. vehicles, garages & shelters) | 80% | 82% |
| Road and bridge maintenance & upgrades | | 11% |
| Road safety (incl. research & campaigns) | 11% | 4% |
| Walking & cycling programmes & publicity | 6% | 2.5% |
| Distribution and freight (incl. review of a London lorry ban) | 1% | |
| "Safer routes to schools" initiative | 2% | |

From the scheme's introduction in 2003 until December 2013, gross revenue reached about £2.6 billion, of which, over £1.2 billion (46%) has been invested in transport, including £960 million on improvements to the bus network; £102 million on roads and bridges; £70 million on road safety; £51 million on local transport/borough plans; and £36 million on sustainable transport and the environment.

== See also ==
- Electronic toll collection
- Road pricing in the United Kingdom
- Transport in London
- Westminster motorcycle parking charge
- Congestion pricing in New York City
