= Bricklayers Arms =

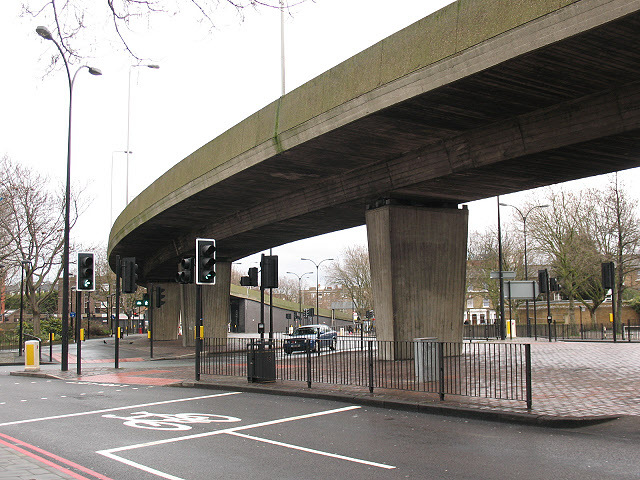
- Interactive map of Bricklayers Arms

Location
- Southwark, London
- Coordinates: 51.49425°N 0.08555°W
- Roads at junction: A2; A100; A201

Construction
- Type: Roundabout interchange
- Maintained by: Transport for London

Location in Southwark

Bricklayers Arms is the road intersection of the A2 and the London Inner Ring Road where Bermondsey meets Walworth and Elephant & Castle in south London. It is the junction of Tower Bridge Road, Old Kent Road, New Kent Road and Great Dover Street. It comprises a four-way green roundabout plus one-way flyover and one-way bypass lane.

The latter help traffic using any of the six road bridges west of London Bridge to access the arterial road to and from the south-east quadrant of the orbital motorway, Old Kent Road. Specifically, eastbound traffic from New Kent Road to Old Kent Road can use the flyover; the reverse flow can use the ground-level bypass lane.

The junction is named after a coaching inn that stood here, in turn related to the prowess of Kent in brickmaking. It is centred 500 metres north-west of Mandela Way which was at the heart of the main goods and locomotive sheds named the Bricklayers Arm depots and similar.

== Coaching inn and brick carts ==
A succession of inns, the original name which may have been the documented Bricklayers Arms, served this junction for more than six hundred years. Excavations during the rebuilding of the inn in the 1890s came across very old foundations and a hidden hoard of ancient coins.

After the mid-18th century building of Westminster Bridge (and associated New Kent Road) this was where the many mid- and east-Kent, such as Dover, Maidstone and Canterbury coaches using the Old Kent Road to or from the City of London set down or picked up passengers travelling to or from the West End. The inn's landlord was always the City of London Corporation. Its sign was the coat of arms of the Worshipful Company of Tylers and Bricklayers. The road – and nearby yards – were busy with the supply of bricks to London. Major brickearth deposits, regionally, are in Kent, particularly on the North Downs dip slope and on the Hoo peninsula, sections of the Medway and Stour valleys. Its mineral content is critical to its applicability in brickmaking and requires precise proportions of chalk, clay, and iron.

== Roundabout with flyover ==
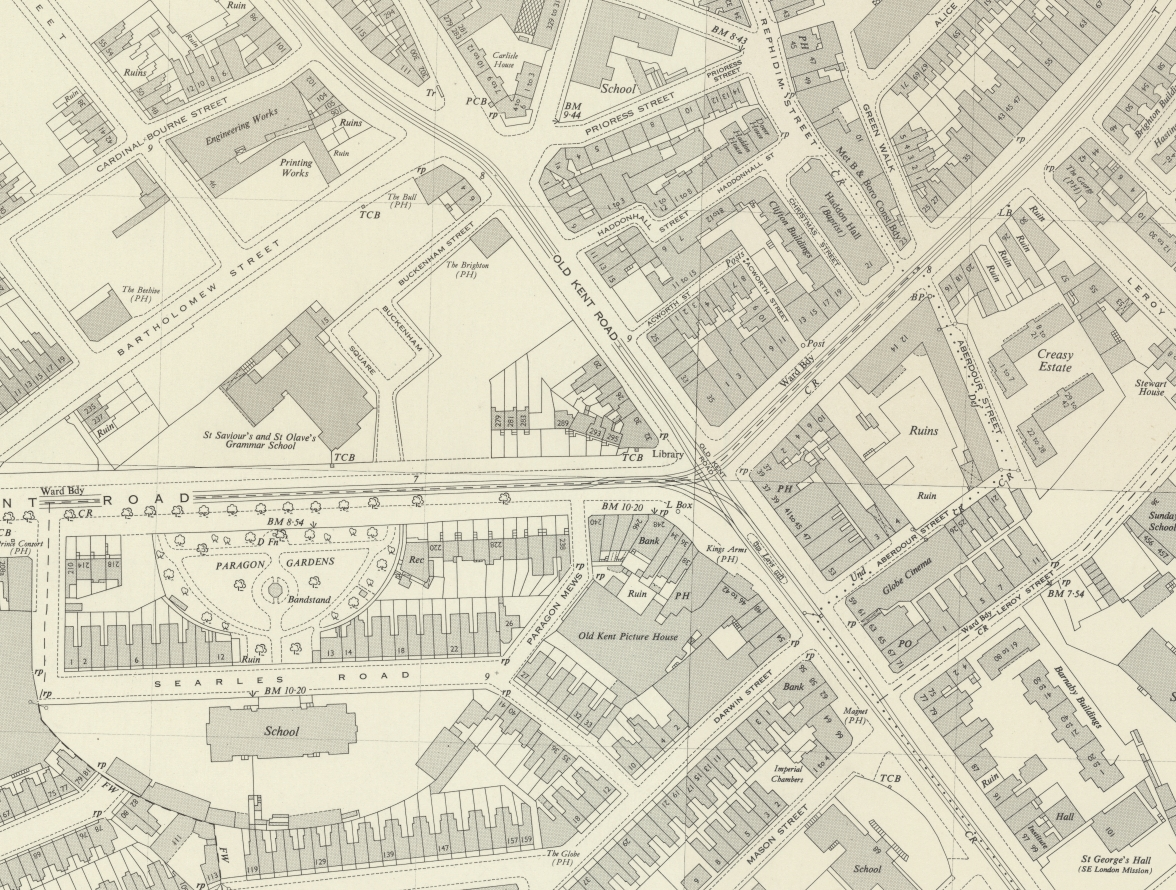
Layout of the junction, as the immediate forebear crossroads, in 1950. This also shows how the 1750s-built Great Dover Street – having re-assumed the exact course of the Old Kent Road (Tabard Street) – was for a few yards restored in its pre-1750 name of Old Kent Road.

Approval of plans for construction of the roundabout and flyover to replace the junction of, and some buildings at, the Old Kent Road (A2), New Kent Road (A201) and Tower Bridge Road (A100) was given by the London County Council in December 1962 with an initial budget cost of £3,510,000 (equivalent to £66,000,000 in 2025). Works were scheduled for 1967. Such construction involved demolition of buildings in all three roads and surrounds as part of a larger regeneration programme. The north end of the Old Kent Road has since the 1750s been bifurcated into Great Dover Street and Tabard Street. These briefly re-combine north of this junction and have taken the greater street's name since the roundabout was built.

In the 1970s a plan of Greater London Council envisaged a road to link the roundabout and the north approach to the Blackwall Tunnel, crossing the Thames in two tunnels (one adjacent to Tower Bridge) and providing a link to Canary Wharf.

== Filling-in of subways ==
The work done made pedestrian underpasses from adjacent roads into the roundabout heart, as London Underground safeguarded a possible extension route of the Bakerloo line from its terminus at Elephant & Castle tube station. This could run along and under the main road under the route of tracks of the demolished station and branch, to join surface services at South Bermondsey station. The roundabout could host a station, akin to Old Street station. Neither remains in the budgeted Bakerloo line extension to Lewisham. In 2013 the circuitous subways were filled in and levelled, becoming wider pavements.

== Crossings ==
Since 2009, pelican crossings exist across New Kent and Old Kent Roads.

== Sources ==
- Arnold, Lester (29 January 1898). "Where rare coins come from". The Boy's Own Paper (994).
- Nock, O.S. (1961). The South Eastern and Chatham Railway. London: Ian Allan.
