= Elephant Park =

Elephant Park may refer to:

- A visitor attraction in Orange, NSW, Australia; see Orange, New South Wales § Attractions
- A public park in the Elephant and Castle area of London
- An elephant reserve, a protected area for elephants
