= 2002 in Cage Rage Championships =

Information
- First date: September 7, 2002
- Last date: September 7, 2002

Events
- Total events: 1

Fights
- Total fights: 13

Chronology
2002 in Cage Rage Championships	2003 in Cage Rage

The year 2002 was the 1st year in the history of the Cage Rage Championships, a mixed martial arts promotion based in the United Kingdom. In 2002 Cage Rage Championships held 1 event, Cage Rage 1.

== Events list ==
#	Event title	Date	Arena	Location
1	Cage Rage 1	September 7, 2002	The Fusion Leisure Centre, Elephant & Castle	London, United Kingdom

== Cage Rage 1 ==
Cage Rage 1 was held on September 7, 2002 at The Fusion Leisure Centre, Elephant & Castle in London, United Kingdom.

=== Results ===
Main Card
Weight class				Method	Round	Time	Notes
	Jean Silva	vs.	Steve Cooper	Draw	0	0:00
	Paul Taylor	vs.	Matt Ewin	Draw	0	0:00
	Simon Holmes	vs.	Steve Thomas	Draw	0	0:00
	Robbie Olivier	def.	Anthony Curtis	TKO	2	0:00
	Phil Holmes	def.	Stuart Dowding	Submission (Rear Naked Choke)	1	0:00
	Marc Walder	def.	Kasan Hipkiss	Submission (Armbar)	1	0:00
	Terry McDougall	def.	Chris Hill	Submission (Guillotine Choke)	1	0:00
	Ryan Robinson	vs.	Glen Appleby	Draw	0	0:00
	Philly San	def.	Lee Shearwood	Submission (Armbar)	1	0:00
	Ryan Norwood	def.	Rob Nutley	Submission (Armbar)	1	0:00
	Dave Mace	vs.	Ross Bailey	Draw	0	0:00
	Tom Gerald	def.	Chris Hipkiss	TKO	1	0:00
	Lance King	def.	Gary Martin	TKO	1	0:00

== See also ==
- Cage Rage Championships
- List of Cage Rage champions
- List of Cage Rage events
