= Strata SE1 =

Building at Elephant and Castle in the London Borough of Southwark

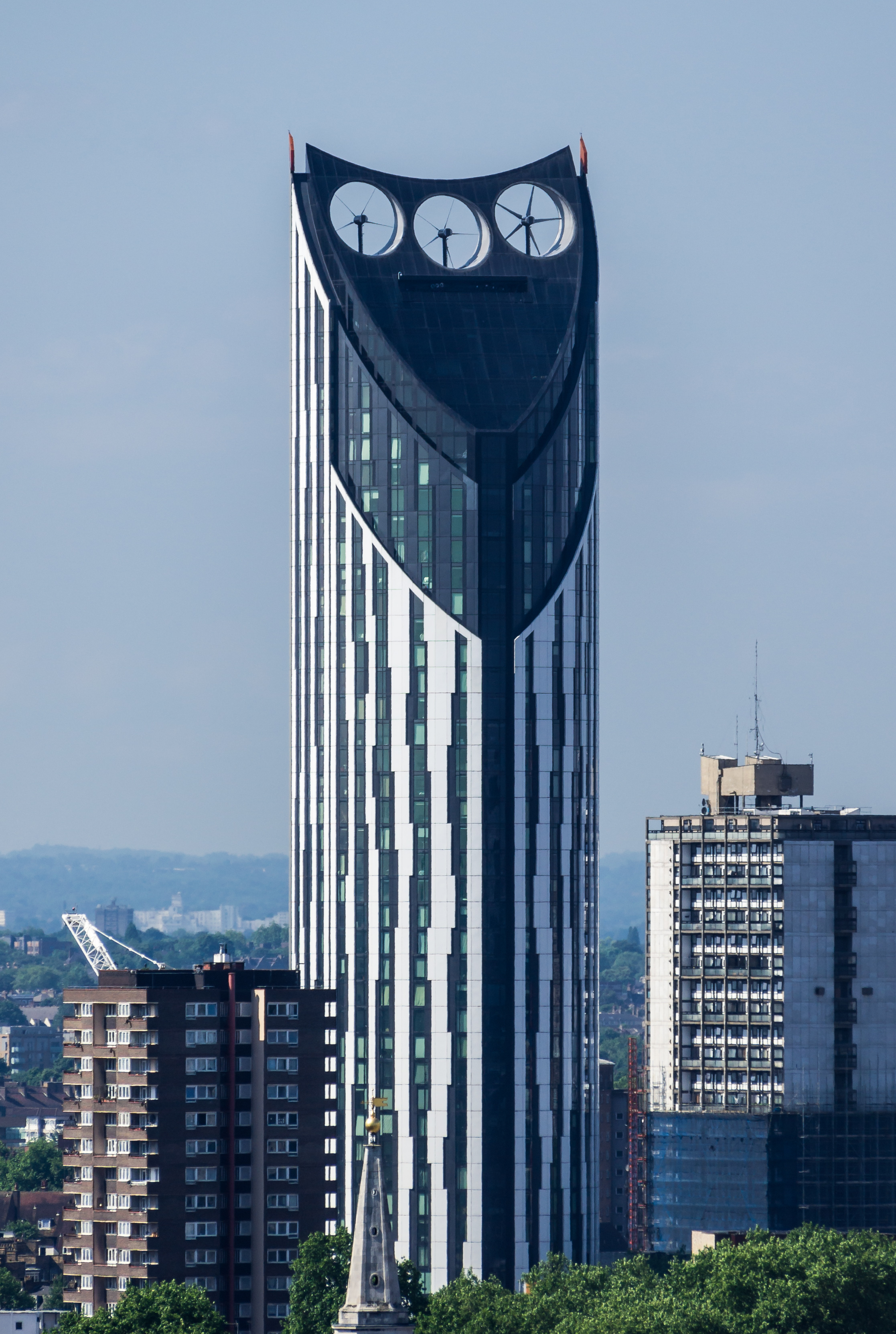
- Strata SE1 from Monument in 2014

General information
- Status: Completed
- Type: Residential
- Location: Elephant & Castle; London, SE1; England
- Coordinates: 51°29′34″N 0°05′59″W
- Construction started: 2007
- Completed: 2010
- Cost: Over £113 million

Height
- Roof: 147 m (482 ft)

Technical details
- Floor count: 43
- Floor area: 306,000 sq ft (28,400 m^{2}) GEA / 255,000 sq ft (23,700 m^{2}) NIA
- Lifts/elevators: 4

Design and construction
- Architect: BFLS
- Developer: Brookfield Europe
- Structural engineer: WSP — Structural, M&E Engineer, Acoustic Consultants and Fire Engineer
- Main contractor: Brookfield Multiplex

Strata SE1 is a 147-metre (482 ft), 43-storey skyscraper at Elephant & Castle in the London Borough of Southwark with more than 1,000 residents living in its 408 flats.

At the time of its construction, the building, designed by BFLS (formerly Hamiltons), was the tallest residential building in London and the first building in the world to have wind turbines integral to its original structure, although these no longer function.

In March 2014, an Ipsos MORI poll for New London Architecture of 500 members of the public aged 16–64 declared Strata SE1 Londoners' fifth favourite tall building, behind The Gherkin, The Shard, 122 Leadenhall Street (The Cheesegrater) and One Canada Square (Canary Wharf).

== The building ==
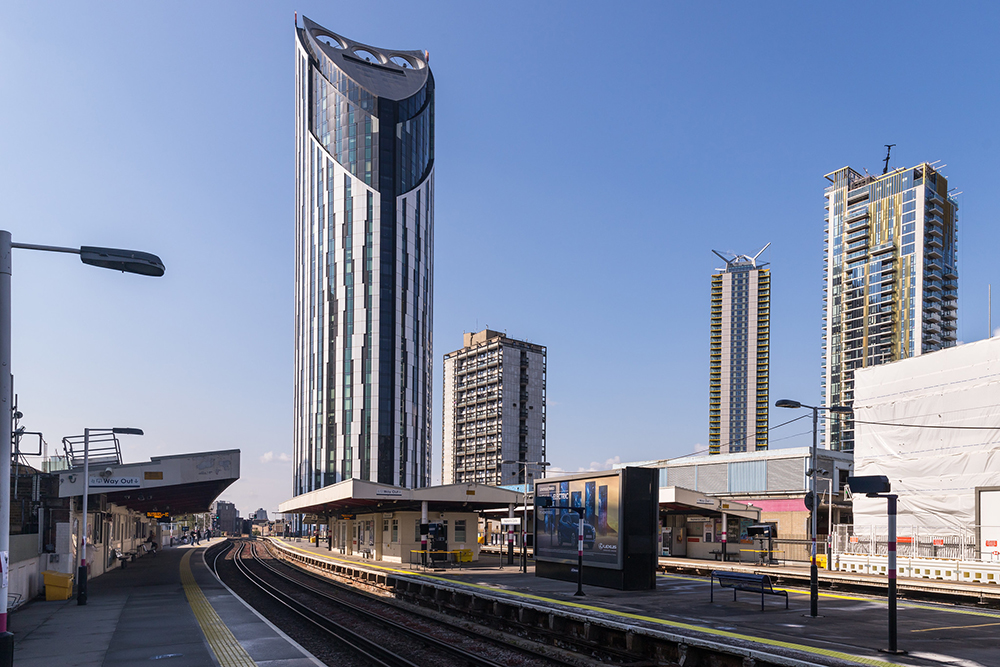
Strata SE1, Draper House, Highpoint and One The Elephant

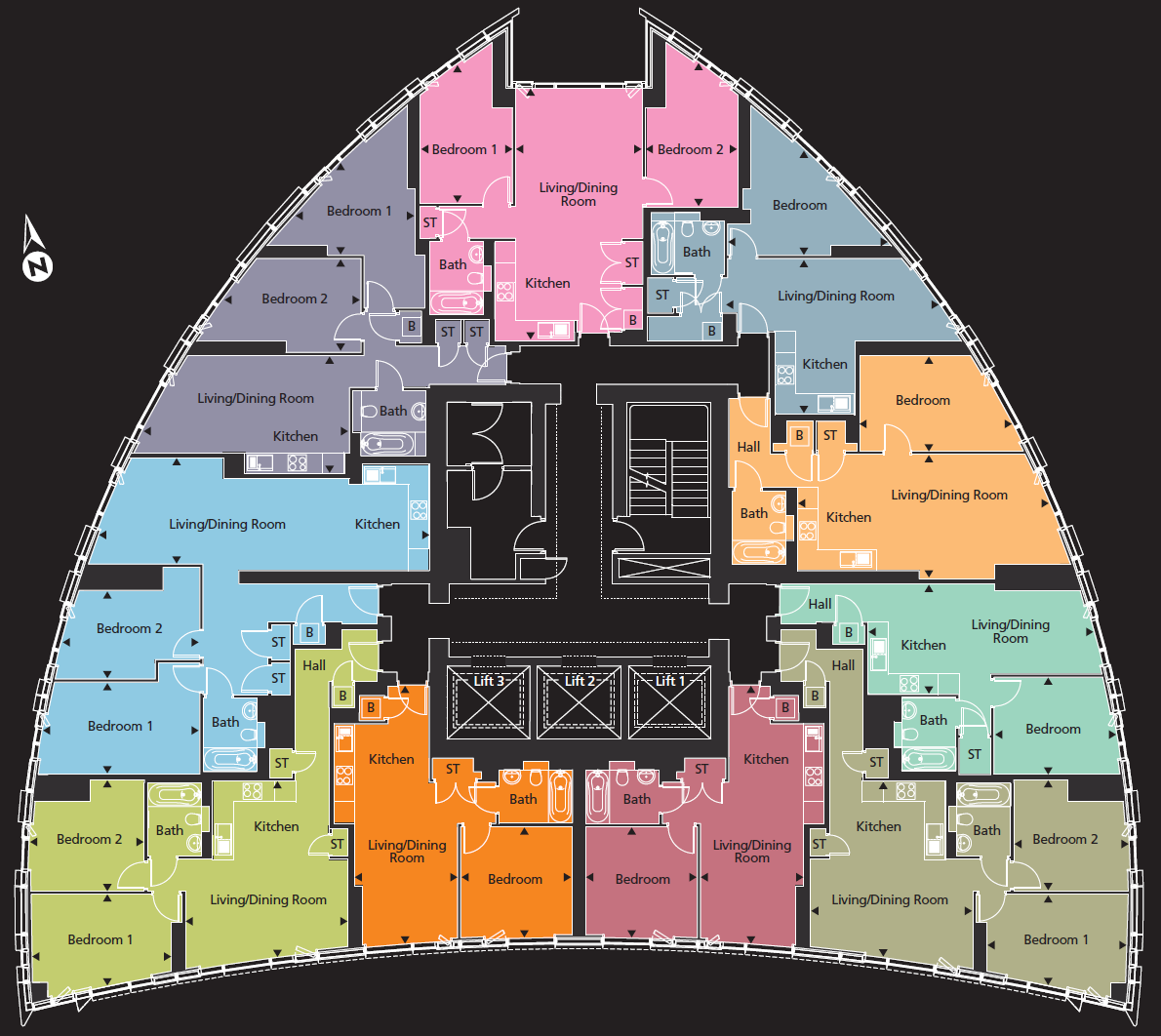
Floor plan (floors 2–10)

At the time of construction there was an attempt by journalists to nickname the building "The Razor", and "The Electric Razor". Boris Johnson, then Mayor of London, called it "The Lipstick", while describing it as a building "with a bit of oomph about it". None of these nicknames seriously caught on with local residents, however.

Twenty-five per cent of the building's flats were sold by Family Mosaic Housing Association (later incorporated into the Peabody Trust, which is now the landlord for the flats still under the shared-ownership regime) for shared-ownership sale. These consist of the "Esprit Apartments" — located on floors 2–10 of the tower — and a further nine flats in the adjacent "Pavilion", a three-storey structure located to the west of the tower and earmarked for former residents of the nearby Heygate Estate.

Each floor of the affordable area comprises 10 flats (equally divided between one and two-bedroom flats), while each floor above the 10th floor contains 11 flats in a mixture of studios, one-bedroom flats, two-bedroom flats, and three-bedroom flats to a total of 310 units.

Only the open-market flats have access to car-parking (in the basement of the building). The 39th floor features a "Sky Lobby" (a small corridor with a view over central London), while the living area is topped by a £2.5M three-bedroom duplex penthouse. The ground floor comprises two commercial units. A third one is located in the Pavilion, along with a "kiosk".

A prominent feature at the top of the building is three wind turbines, although they have rarely been used, in part due to resident complaints over noise and vibration. The one-level basement of the building contains a secure car park and 437 bicycle storage places.

The building is served by four lifts in total. Two go from the basement to the 39th floor, one from the basement to the 10th floor (the 'poor lift'), and the last one serves floors 40 and 41.

=== Construction ===
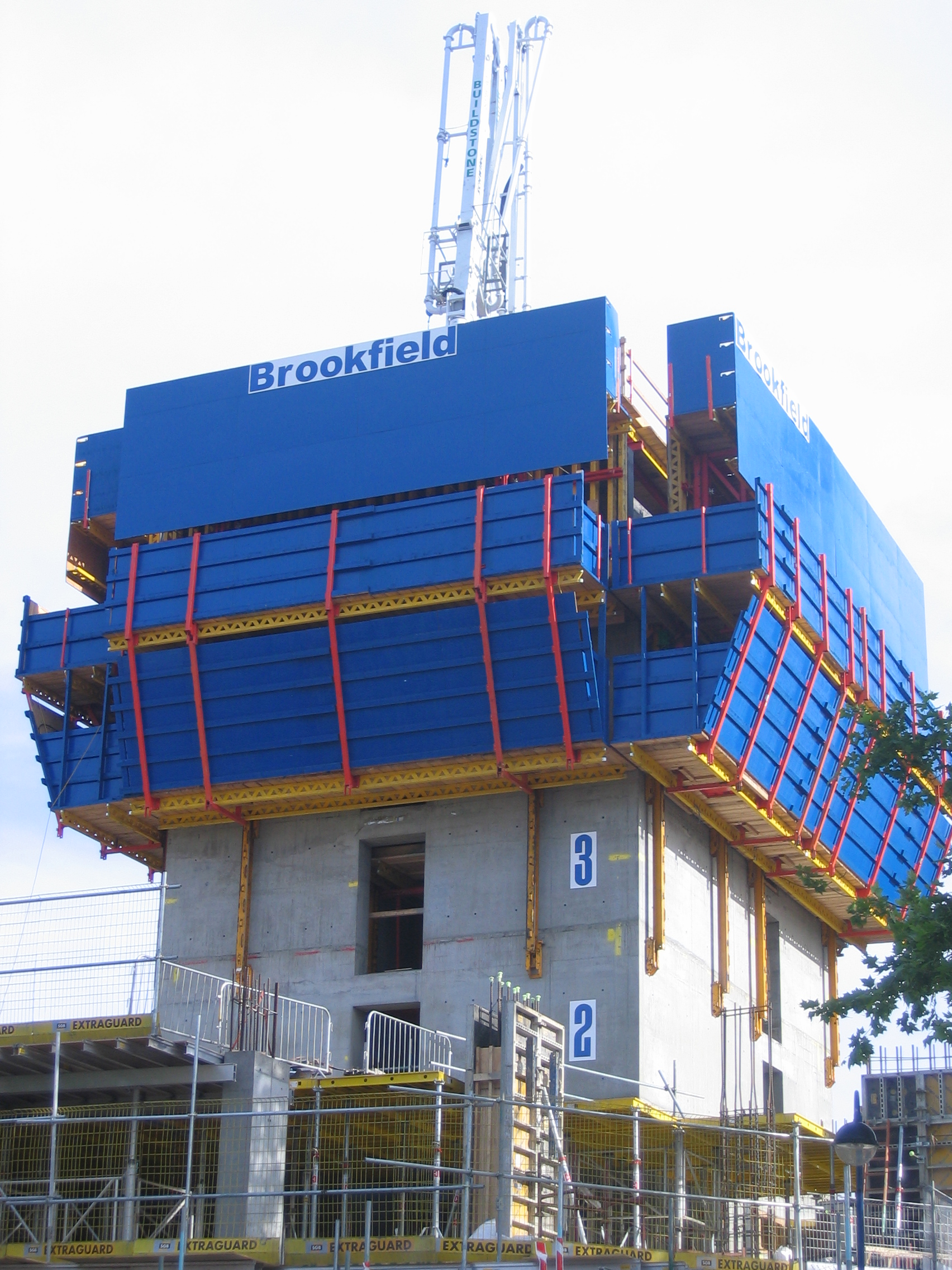
The core rising in June 2008 using PERI ACS-R core climbing system.

Although planning permission had been granted in 2003 for a different project, the current tower was first proposed in 2005, with Southwark Council granting planning permission for the building in March 2006. In its response to the statutory consultation (para. 45), the council's Elephant and Castle Development Team indicated that “the incorporation of the wind turbines to create a dramatic and highly recognisable building form that achieves one of the Council’s plan objectives which is to create landmark buildings as signifiers of the Elephant and Castle on the London skyline. The turbines are of course not merely decorative but have a function which is directly related to the Elephant’s status as an energy action area and to the achievement of the zero carbon growth which is a key objective of the framework.”

Construction began in 2007 and was completed in June 2010. The cost is estimated at £113.5 million.

The building was 'topped out' in June 2009. Attending the topping-out ceremony were over 70 senior members of London's business community including Sir Simon Milton, Deputy Mayor for Policy and Planning, Cllr Nick Stanton, Leader of Southwark Council and MP for North Southwark and Bermondsey, Simon Hughes.

The turbines were installed in May 2010, but were only operational sporadically in the first few months after the opening of the building. They have now been mothballed.

=== Sustainability claims ===
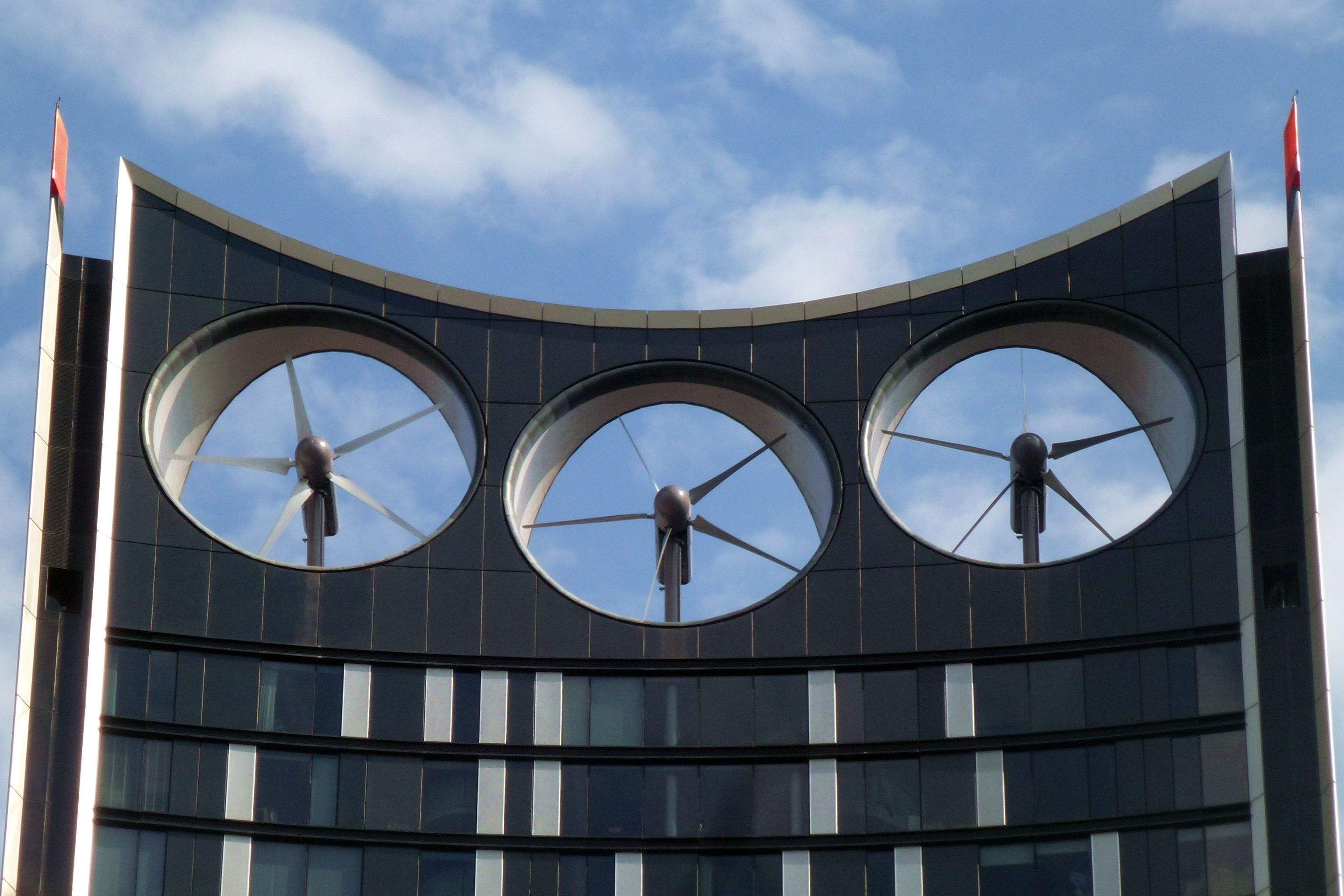
Detail of the non-moving wind turbines

The planning conditions allowing the construction of the building required the inclusion of a source of sustainable energy. Rambøll, the engineering consultancy involved with the Bahrain World Trade Center, which also features wind turbines, was involved in the project.

The three 18-metre (59 ft) wind turbines (each blade is 9 metres (30 ft) long) at the top of the building are rated at 19 kW each and were anticipated to produce a combined 50MWh of electricity per year, enough to power 8% of the energy needs of the building, sufficient to supply the building's communal areas. The turbines were criticised as "greenwashing" by the panel of the 2010 Carbuncle Cup, and residents were reporting in 2010 that the turbines barely moved. In 2014, The Guardian reported that the turbines had "remained stationary ever since". In 2022, the chair of Southwark's planning committee said that the developers had failed to take into account how much the vibration of the turbines would pass through the building, and that the noise was louder on the higher floors. He said that the turbines had been switched off mainly due to complaints from residents, and described them as a "white elephant".

In 2010, the building exceeded by 13% the then-current UK regulations relating to sustainability, whilst overall carbon emissions were expected to be 15% lower than the Mayor of London's good practice benchmark. The developers expected that the building would achieve 2050 CO_{2} target emissions and that (with the Multi-Utility Services Company in place in the area) it would achieve a predicted 73.5% reduction in CO_{2} emissions when measured against the Building Regulations benchmark.

Featured on-site is a combined heat and power system to provide sustainable power generation, with a provision for the collection of rainwater for re-use. The energy costs per flat are envisaged to be up to 40% less than Britain's typical housing average. The building is clad in a "bespoke high thermal performing façade" with an air permeability leakage rate that is apparently 50% better than current building regulations.

== In popular culture ==
The building can often be seen in incidental panoramic shots in films and TV programmes set in London.

- The building serves as background to a scene featuring James McAvoy in the 2013 film Welcome to the Punch.
- Part of the action of the 2012 post-apocalypse novel Ice Diaries by Lexi Revellian, published by Hoxton Press, is set in the building. ISBN 0956642276

== Castle House ==
Strata SE1 is located on the site of Castle House, an early 1960s six-storey office building, which was the first commercial premises at the newly rebuilt Elephant & Castle. When completed, Castle House was warmly received. The Architects' Journal in August 1962 found "little to criticise and much to praise and until New Zealand House is completed it is possibly one of the best examples for anyone wanting to look at a good office block in London."

During the demolition of Castle House to clear land for Strata, a construction worker, John Walker, 33, father of two was killed when a roof collapsed on him. He was employed by 777 Demolition and Haulage Company Ltd, which was served with a Prohibition Notice by the Health & Safety Executive. An inquest was due to be held at Inner London South Coroner's Court.

In November 2015, both companies were fined several hundred thousand pounds as a result of their negligence.

== Awards ==
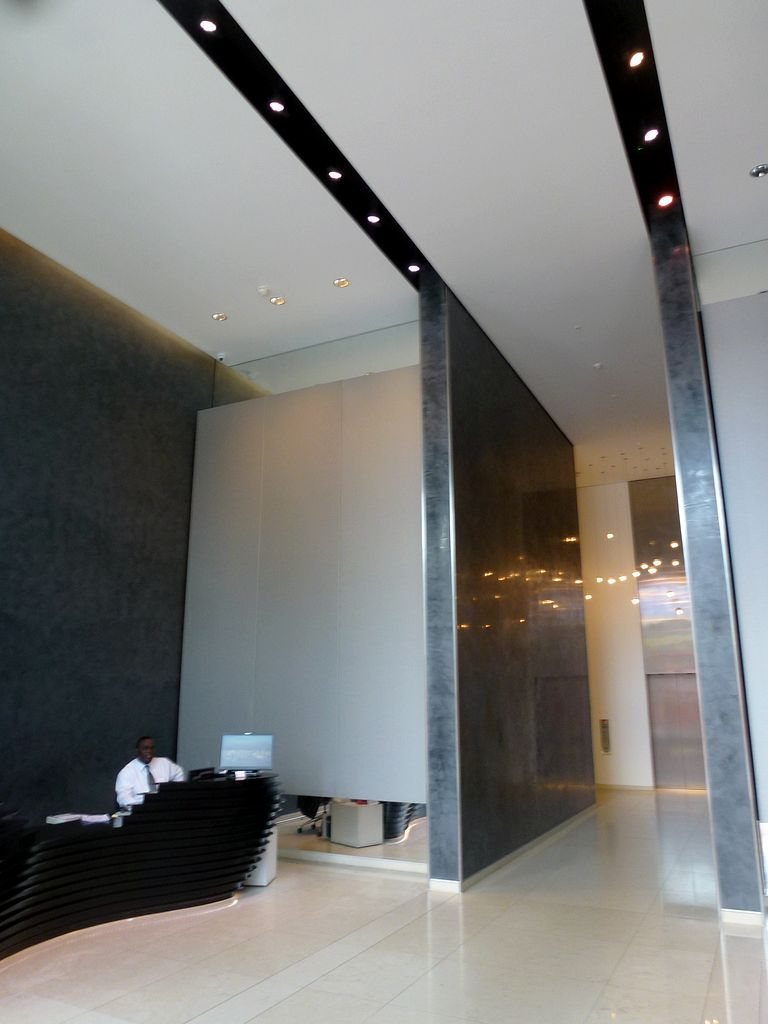
The lobby in August 2012.

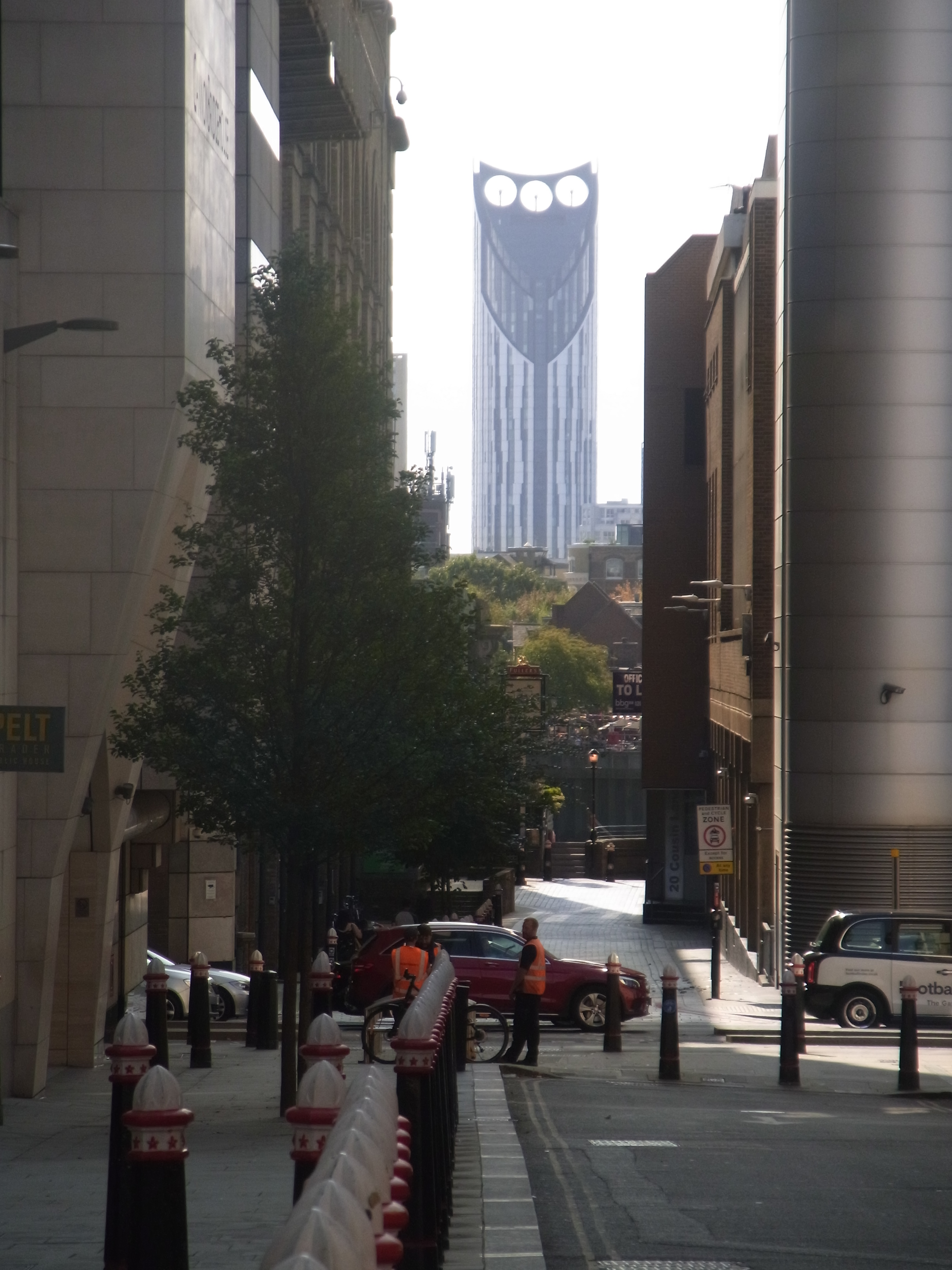
Strata as seen from Cannon Street, City of London, September, 2020

In August 2010, Strata SE1 was awarded the 2010 Carbuncle Cup. The yearly award, organized by Building Design magazine, selects one building from a shortlist of 30, nominated by readers. It recognises "the ugliest building in the United Kingdom completed in the last 12 months". Inspired by this, the building appeared in 2012 on a list of the world's 21 ugliest buildings drawn up by the Daily Telegraph.

Considerate Constructors Scheme

- Bronze Award 2010 – Strata SE1
- Gold Award 2011 – Strata SE1

On 12 November 2010, the building was the overall winner of the 2010 Concrete Society Awards, ahead of schemes from David Chipperfield, Hopkins Architects, Caruso St John, McInnes Usher McKnight Architects (MUMA) and Alsop Architects. The judges commented: "This building is striking architecturally, a considerable feat of construction on this restricted site...". They particularly singled out Strata's "innovative column strategy".

British Constructional Steelwork Association Structural Steel Design Awards 2010

- 3 Bronze Awards for Strata SE1 – Awarded to Principal Contractor – Brookfield Multiplex Construction Europe Ltd, Developer – Brookfield Europe & Subcontractor – Bourne Steel

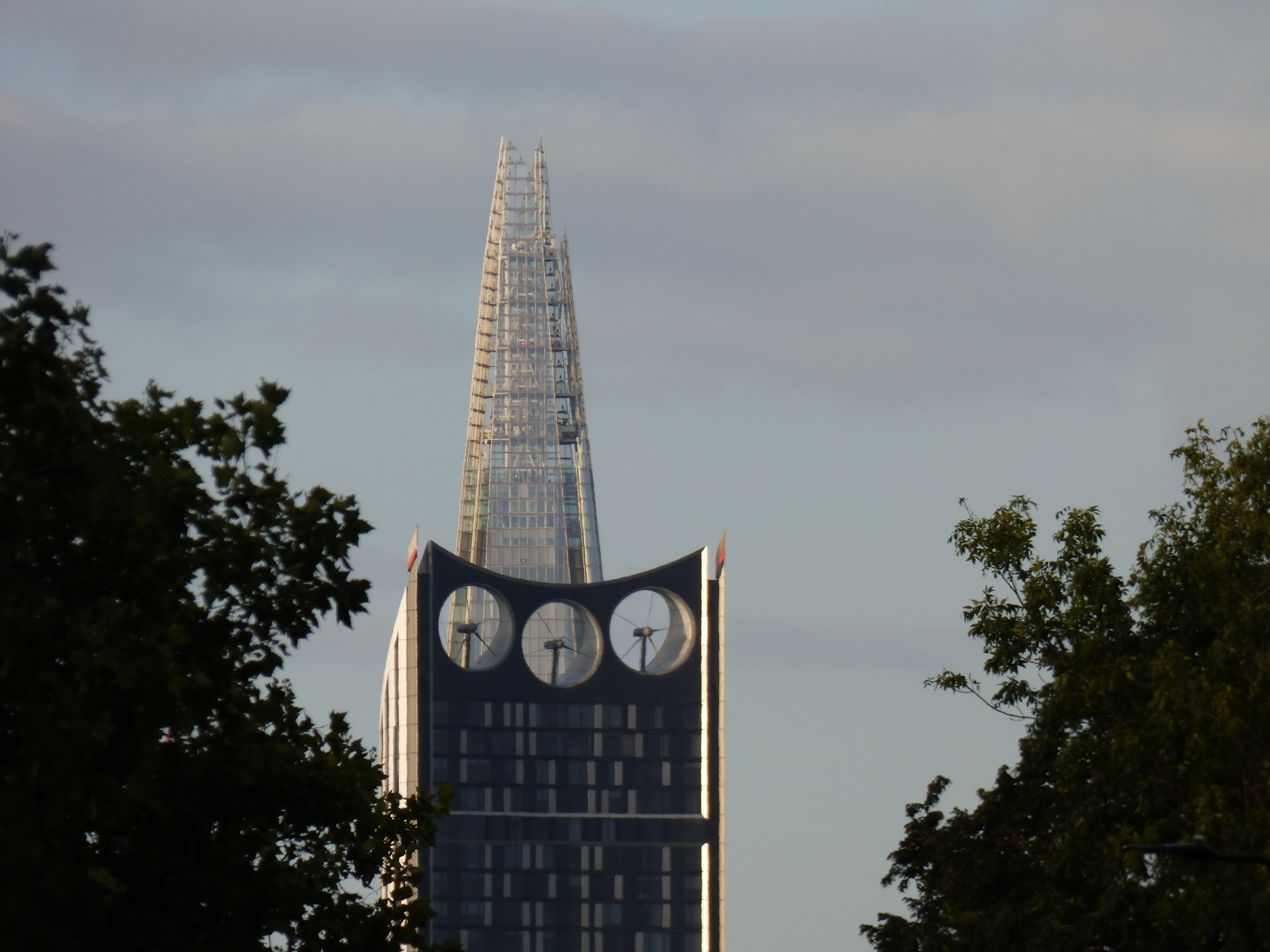
The Strata (foreground) and The Shard (background) seen from Stockwell, London, 2024

City of London Sustainable City Awards 2011

- Highly Commended for Resource Conservation – Strata SE1
- Highly Commended for Sustainable Building – Strata SE1

In May 2011, the building was shortlisted for the ICE London Civil Engineering Awards 2011 for infrastructure and building projects. The award "celebrates outstanding engineering achievement by companies, organisations, and individuals in the capital".

The Green Apple Awards 2011

- Strata SE1 – Environmental Best Practice – Sustainability Sector of Building and Construction (award ceremony November 2011)

RICS Awards 2011

- Regeneration Runner-Up – Strata SE1

London District Surveyors Association 2011

- Best Sustainability Project Strata SE1 – for the recognition of high standards of construction and workmanship

ACE Engineering Excellence 2011

- Building Services – Strata SE1

The Strata Inhabit website (the information site for residents of the building) won "Website of the Year" at the News on the Block Property Management Awards on 5 December 2011.

== Articles ==
- Brookfield's Elephant & Castle tower takes shape, Building.co.uk, 8 March 2010.
- The Strata 'Razor' tower: the cutting-edge of eco-construction, The Guardian, 15 March 2010 (10 pictures).
- In Pictures: Strata Tower, Residential Skyscraper At Elephant And Castle, Londonist, 18 March 2010.
- Strata tower: Southwark’s sore thumb, Building.co.uk, 9 April 2010.
- Don’t Look Down When Strata Tower Opens With Best London Views, Business Week, 13 April 2010.
- "Nestled among ghost homes". The Sydney Morning Herald. 16 April 2010.
- The high life in Elephant & Castle, The Times, 19 May 2010.
- Tower to the people in Elephant and Castle, Evening Standard Homes&Property, 26 May 2010.
- "Wind-powered high-rise living?". Sydney Morning Herald. 30 June 2010.
- Strata SE1, London – propelling sustainable regeneration, Daniel Cowan, Proceedings of the Institution of Civil Engineers - Civil Engineering, Volume 163, Issue 6, 1 November 2010, pages 056 –063, ISSN 0965-089X, E-ISSN 1751-7672
