= Colona =

Colona may refer to:

== Places ==
- Colona, a former sheep station near Yalata, South Australia
- Colona, Colorado, United States
- Colona, Illinois, United States

== Other uses ==
- Colona, colonate or colonatus, a Late Roman and Early Medieval system in which tenant peasants (coloni) were bound to the land of a landlord
- Colona (plant), a genus of plants in the family Malvaceae
- Edgardo Colona (1846–1904), British stage actor
