= One The Elephant =

Coordinates: 51.4936°N 0.1013°W

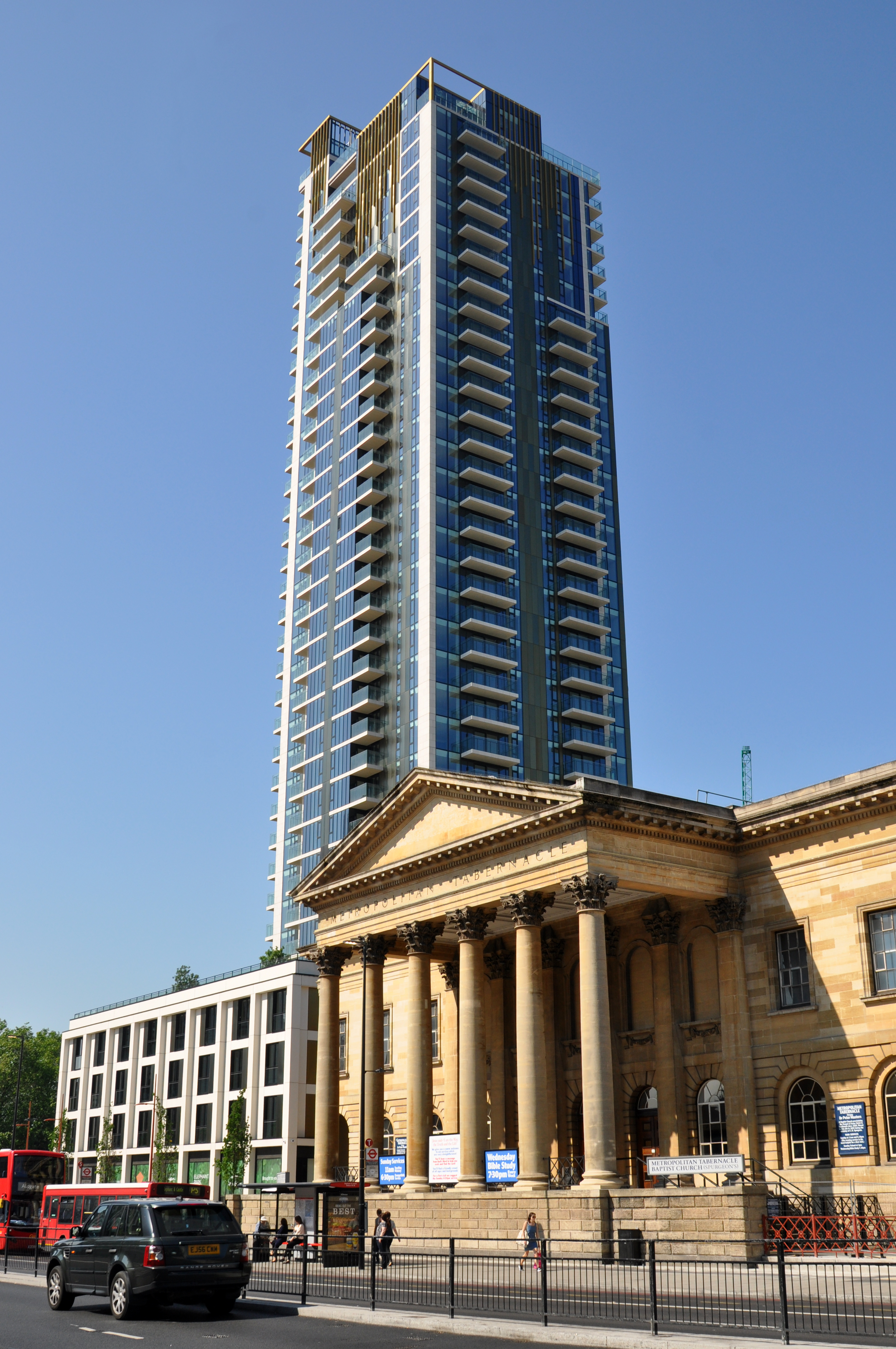
- Interactive map of the One The Elephant area

General information
- Status: Completed
- Location: Elephant & Castle, London, England
- Completed: 2016
- Client: Lendlease

Height
- Roof: 124 m (407 ft)

Technical details
- Floor count: 37

Design and construction
- Architect: Squire & Partners
- Structural engineer: Robert Bird Group
- Main contractor: Lendlease

Website
- onetheelephant.com

One The Elephant is a residential apartment development, in Elephant & Castle in the London Borough of Southwark, centred around a 37-storey 124m tall tower. At the base of the tower is an adjoining four-storey L-shaped pavilion containing apartments and commercial units. The development lies immediately adjacent to the Metropolitan Tabernacle and in close proximity to Elephant & Castle tube station.

Planning consent was granted in 2012. The Mayor of London, Boris Johnson, visited the site as construction began in 2013. The development was completed in summer 2016.

The development comprises 284 studio, one-bedroom, two-bedroom and three-bedroom apartments with 254 in the tower and 30 in the attached four-storey pavilion.

The building is located on the site of a council-owned leisure centre (that featured a swimming pool (closed for many years), a gym, squash courts and a sports hall). The building contains no affordable housing, with the developer Lendlease making a £3m payment in lieu towards the development of adjacent leisure facility, the Castle Centre. Including that payment, the sale of the land and proceeds from an overage deal, Southwark Council received £22m from the One The Elephant development which more than covered the £20m cost of the new leisure centre.

== Awards ==
One The Elephant was awarded Best Residential High-rise Architecture London at the 2016 International Property Awards. The building was also shortlisted for the Best Residential High-rise Architecture UK award.

== See also ==
- Strata SE1
- Highpoint (building)
