= Michael Faraday Memorial =

Memorial in London to Michael Faraday

Coordinates: 51°29′42″N 0°6′2″W

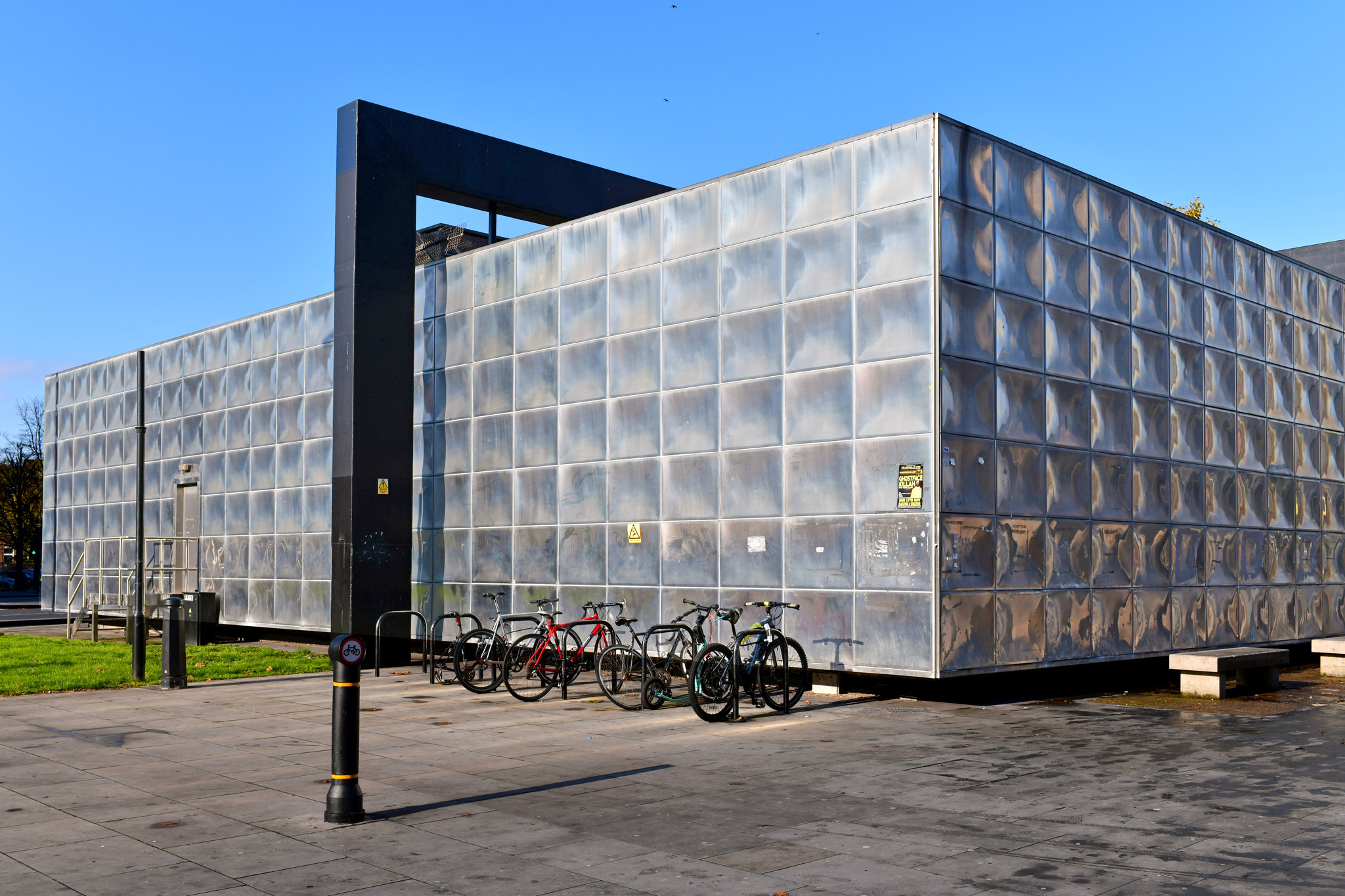
Michael Faraday Memorial

The Michael Faraday Memorial is a monument to the Victorian scientist Michael Faraday. It is located at Elephant Square in Elephant and Castle, London, England.

== Description ==
The stainless steel box-shaped structure was designed by modern movement architect Rodney Gordon in 1959 and built in 1961, on the centre of what was the northern roundabout of the Elephant and Castle gyratory system. It commemorates Michael Faraday's importance as a scientist and was placed at Elephant and Castle because Faraday's birthplace is nearby in Newington Butts.

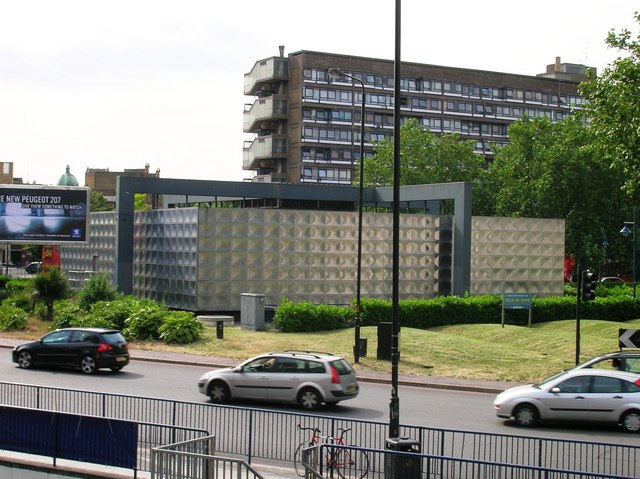
The memorial stands in Elephant Square

The interior of the construction contains a London Underground electrical substation for the Northern line and Bakerloo line (somewhat appropriate for a memorial to one of the great pioneers of electricity). Rodney Gordon originally designed the box clad in glass, intending the workings of the transformer to be seen. The possibility of vandalism prevented this, so the design was changed to a metal casing.

Aspects of Gordon's design which explained the connection to Faraday were left out when it was constructed, so few people realise why it is there. However, there is an inscription in the concrete paving nearby explaining that it is the Faraday Memorial.

In 1996, the monument was given Grade II listed building status.

== Proposed and actual changes ==
In 1996, the memorial was given a new lighting scheme designed by a local schoolgirl from English Martyrs R.C primary school, the result of a competition held by Blue Peter, the BBC children's programme.

Plans in the early 2000s to redevelop the Elephant and Castle included turning the roundabout into a peninsula and moving the Michael Faraday Memorial 400 metres south-east to the Walworth Road, where it would stand next to the Cuming Museum and possibly become part of a proposed science museum. These plans were shelved as the regeneration of Elephant and Castle evolved into a scheme that retained the roundabout, before changing into a scheme that retained the memorial in its current position by "peninsulaising" it, in the process making it easier to access.

In May 2012, the 16-year-old lighting scheme (which had long since stopped working) was replaced with a new disco theme by Southwark Council, animating every evening after dark.

== In popular culture ==
Electronic musician Aphex Twin satirically claimed in a 2001 interview to have bought the structure and lived inside it. The structure briefly appears in the official video for Aphex Twin's "T69 Collapse".

== See also ==
- Statue of Michael Faraday, at Institution of Engineering and Technology, Savoy Place, London
- List of things named after Michael Faraday
