= Elephant Square =

Coordinates: 51.4952°N 0.1005°W

Elephant Square in May 2018. The tube station entrances are at the upper left (Bakerloo line) and lower right (Northern line), and the Elephant & Castle pub is at the upper right

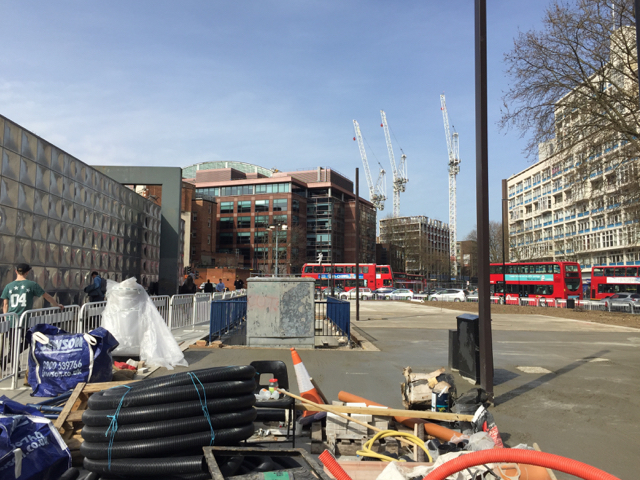
The square under construction in 2016

Elephant Square is a public space in Elephant and Castle, London. The square was created by Transport for London (TfL) as part of work to reconfigure the local road layout. By removing the road on the east side of the area's northern roundabout, TfL joined a former traffic island to the site of the Elephant and Castle shopping centre. The new square forms one part of the regeneration programme underway in the district which includes plans for a new town centre.

The square is located at one of the most famous junctions in London, home to the Elephant and Castle pub after which the area takes its name. The 2015 redesign created consternation amongst road users for whom the roundabout had been a regular part of their daily commute.

At the heart of the square is the Michael Faraday Memorial, a local landmark in the form of a large stainless steel box named in honour of Michael Faraday (who was born nearby). It contains an electrical substation for the Northern line of the London Underground.
