= Hannibal House =

Building in Southwark, London, England

Coordinates: 51.4944°N 0.0997°W

- Interactive map of the Hannibal House area

General information
- Status: Demolished
- Construction started: 1960
- Completed: 1965
- Demolished: April 2021

Technical details
- Floor count: 16

Hannibal House was a 1960s office building positioned above the Elephant and Castle shopping centre in Southwark, south London.

== History ==
In 1968 it housed the Government offices of the Ministry of Public Building and Works, Post Office Directorate. This Directorate was responsible for the design and construction of new P.O. projects, including exchanges and P.O. buildings. This included The Post Office Research Establishment at Martlesham Heath in Suffolk. Home office work was also carried out such as building and modifications of prisons and large fire brigade projects. The Fire Brigade technical college at Moreton-in-Marsh in Gloucestershire was one of these. This Directorate, during Government reorganisation in the early 1970s, became part of The Directorate of the Environment (Public Service Agency) and moved to new office accommodation in Croydon (Apolo and Luner Houses).

Until 2005, the building housed various bodies and agencies of the Department of Health, including the Devices section of the Medicines and Healthcare products Regulatory Agency (the Medical Devices Agency until April 2003). It achieved some fame in hosting the enquiries into the murders of Stephen Lawrence in 1997, and Victoria Climbie. Various training and religious organisations have since taken up offices. Although the building was expected to be demolished in 2012, it was announced in March 2007 that the British passport interview office for London would be based on the 9th and 10th floors. The interview office of the Identity and Passport Service opened to the public in September 2007.

With the planned redevelopment of the area, tenants, which mostly included charities, were evicted in 2018. The demolition of Hannibal House and of the shopping centre it stood on started in April 2021.
