= Jahaziel (rapper) =

- Born: Jahaziel Micah Ben Elliott; 26 July 1976 (age 49); London, England
- Genres: Hip hop
- Occupation(s): Singer, rapper, songwriter
- Instrument: Vocals
- Years active: 2007–present
- Labels: Preacha Boy, Xist, Malaco

Jahaziel Micah Ben Elliott (born 26 July 1976), known mononymously as Jahaziel, is a British musician who primarily specialises in hip hop music. He has released two studio albums, Ready to Live in 2007 and Heads Up in 2013. Along with these, Jahaziel released a mixtape called The Still Living Mixtape in 2011.

== Early life ==
Jahaziel was raised in Elephant and Castle, London, England, where he was involved in the gang drug business, while he was in his early-teenage years. He was stabbed by an assailant, who tried to burgle the residence he was watching. His secondary schools changed on five occasions, due to his gang activity, and run-ins with law enforcement. Jahaziel went to church circa 1994, when he was about 18 years old, and this is where he became a Christian.

== Music career ==
He started his music career in 2007 with the studio album, Ready to Live, that was released by Preacha Boy Records, on 28 August 2007. The subsequent release, a mixtape, The Still Livin' Mixtape, on 3 May 2011. His second studio album, Heads Up, was released on 19 November 2013, with Xist Music and Malaco Records.

== Personal life ==
He married Nadine Steele on 28 May 2005, where they reside in London, England, with their daughter.

In 2015 Elliott announced through Instagram that he no longer professed Christianity, stating that he had become disillusioned to its teachings.

== Discography ==
Studio albums

- Ready to Live (28 August 2007, Preacha Boy)
- Heads Up (19 November 2013, Xist/Malaco)

Mixtape

- The Still Livin' Mixtape (3 May 2011)
