= The Coronet =

Music venue and club in London, England

Coordinates: 51.4948°N 0.0989°W

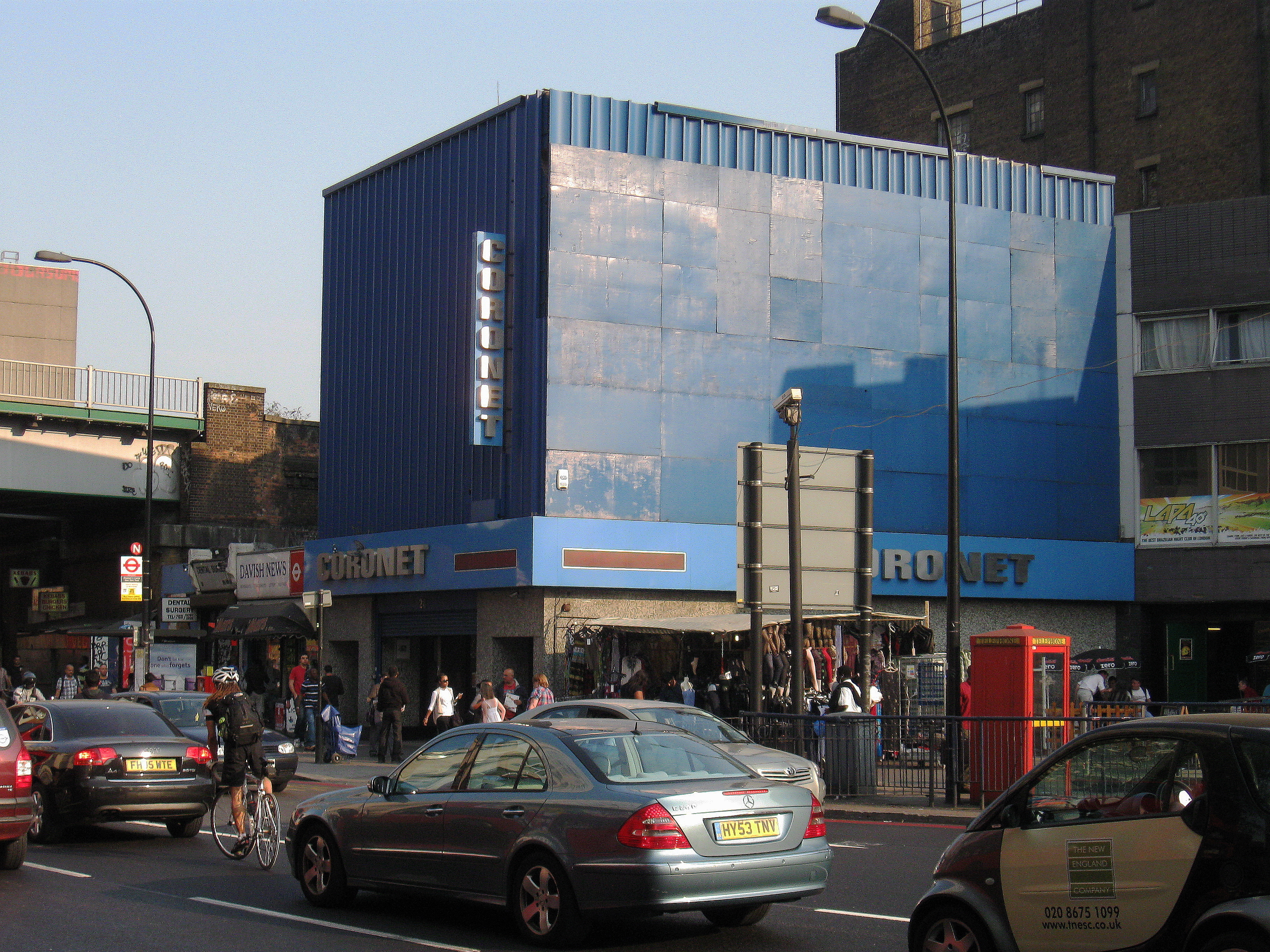
The Coronet in 2011

The Coronet Theatre was a large live music and night-club venue with a 2,600 capacity located at 28 New Kent Road in Elephant and Castle, London, England. The historic venue operated as an entertainment venue from 1879 until 2018 and up to its closure managed to retain all of its art deco features.

The venue makes a brief appearance in the 2008 film Bigga than Ben.

The site was first occupied by the Theatre Royal, built in 1872 and destroyed by fire only six years later. Renovations were initiated by Jethro Thomas Robinson after the fire, and completed by Frank Matcham, to what became the Elephant and Castle Theatre in 1879, where a very young Charlie Chaplin performed. The Theater was converted to an ABC cinema in 1928, a 3,100 seat cinema designed by Matcham & Co. (under F.G.M. Chancellor) with a revolving steam driven organ.

The building survived the Blitz intact and was used as a shelter.

In 1956, a showing of the film Blackboard Jungle gave rise to a riots by the Teddy Boy audience. After that, riots took place around the country wherever the film was shown. In 1966, with the onset of twinning, the Elephant and Castle Cinema was acquired by ABC Cinemas and split into a complex of three cinemas and also a luxury lounge was introduced. The first film to be exhibited was Bonnie and Clyde in 1966.

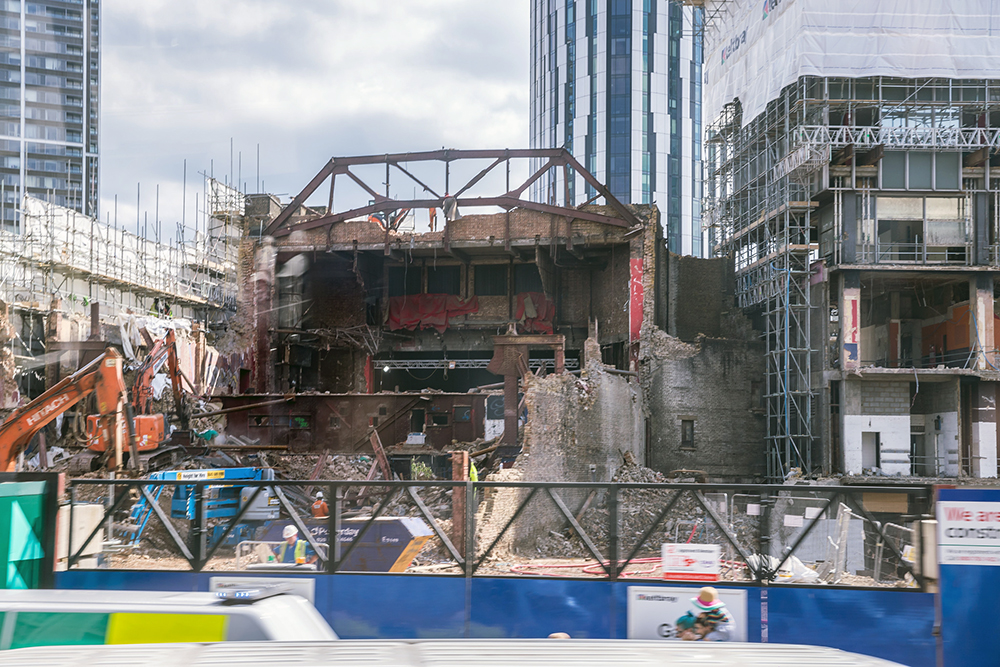
The gutted Coronet in June 2021

After several more name changes, it became the Coronet Cinema in 1981. The Coronet Cinema closed down in 1999, leaving the Elephant and Castle area with no cinemas.

In 2002, theatre producer and entrepreneur Dominic Madden bought The Coronet Theatre as a derelict building, and subsequently brought the venue back to its celebrated and original Art-Deco, removing the cinema complex, reintroducing the upper-gallery design and removing the rake floor. Following a reputed £3m refurbishment, The Coronet Theatre was launched in April 2003 as a multi-media nightclub, but in June 2003 the incumbent nightclub management company Heaven (nightclub) was replaced by a team led by Simon Parkes, the founder of Brixton Academy as Managing Director. The venue has hosted many popular live music artists including Justin Timberlake, Wolfmother, Blur, Oasis, Primal Scream, The Libertines, Macy Gray, LCD Soundsystem, Hot Chip, Grinderman, The Decemberists, Hundred Reasons, Kelis, Alicia Keys, Caribou, Tame Impala, Placebo, Ty Segall, and The Fall among many more live gigs and parties. The venue continued to operate nightclub and live music events up to its closure.

The theatre last operated to 1 January 2018. After some delays, demolition of the building started in early 2021.
