= Philip Core =

American artist and writer

- Born: June 7, 1951; Dallas, Texas, US
- Died: November 12, 1989 (aged 38); London, UK
- Education: Harvard University; Ruskin School of Art; Accademia di Belle Arti di Firenze
- Style: painting, sculpture, contemporary art

Philip McCammon Core (7 June 1951–12 November 1989) was an American artist and writer. He spent most of his adult life in England.

== Biography ==
Core grew up in New Orleans, the son of a well-to-do family. At just seven he won the Vieux Carré Open Artists Competition. He was sent to a military academy, and from 1963 to the Middlesex School in Concord, Massachusetts. He attended Harvard University, where he won a number of art and literature prizes. As a schoolboy he self-published a booklet of drawings Palm Fronde Alphabet. An interest in Aubrey Beardsley and fin de siècle artists and writers, led to him spending time in Paris working with Philippe Jullian on his book The Symbolists, before returning to Harvard to complete an honours thesis on Belgian symbolist Fernand Khnopff. He graduated in 1973.

Under the pseudonym Féllippé Fecit, he produced a series of erotic drawings for the poet John Glassco for his book Squire Hardman, and in 1968 in the Japanese style for The Temple of Pederasty, a free adaption by Glassco of a work by Japanese expatriate writer Ken Sato.

Of this time, George Melly wrote of Core: "an exaggerated child of that extraordinary decade, he made experimental films, bought and designed for a New York boutique, illustrated rather outré books published in limited editions, and worked on an extreme persona. He was untypical only in his lack of interest in drugs. As someone for whom hallucinatory powers were already part of his armoury, and for whom work is of primary importance, chemical stimulae appeared not only unnecessary, but a threat to creation."

Following Harvard he attended the Ruskin School of Drawing and Fine Art in Oxford, and then the Accademia di Belle Arti di Firenze in Florence. In 1975, in his mid-twenties, he settled permanently in London, living in a flat in Elephant and Castle that was painted completely black, before moving to a spacious apartments in Holland Park.

It was an economically depressed period in the UK, but Core managed to gain some income contributing art work to gay magazines, and via private commissions. These included a mural for the Ritz hotel depicting a range of guests over the 75-year history of the hotel.

He became the photography critic for The Independent, and wrote also number of obituaries for the newspaper, including those for Robert Mapplethorpe, Rudolf Nureyev, David Robilliard and Jean-Michel Basquiat.

1984 saw the publication by him of two books: Camp: The Lie That Tells The Truth, and The Original Eye: arbiters of twentieth-century taste.

His encyclopaedic knowledge of lesser-known figures in nineteenth and twentieth century culture led to him becoming a commentator on the BBC Radio 4 programme Kaleidoscope.

Core died of AIDS on 12 November 1989 at the Westminster Hospital in London.

In a catalogue of an exhibition of his work, Core wrote: "I am not a great artist, only someone who loves painting, drawing and making things with his hands above all else; someone who has, by some curious gift of heredity, become possessed of articulacy and intransigence in equal degree; someone who knows what they love and feels no shame about it."

His work is in the permanent collections of the Arts Council of Great Britain, Leslie Lohman Museum, and Tom of Finland Foundation.

== Bibliography ==
- Core, Philip Camp: The Lie That Tells The Truth, Delilah Books, 1984
- Core, Philip; Robilliard, David The New Sixteen Positions: Paintings by Philip Core, Old Bull Arts Centre, Barnet, 1988
- Core, Philip The Original Eye: arbiters of twentieth-century taste, Prentice-Hall, 1984
- Core, Philip; Melly, George Philip Core: Paintings 1975-1985, Gay Mens Press, London 1985
- Core, Philip Claustrophobia: Painting and Sculpture by Philip Core, Watermans Art Centre, Brentford, 1988
