= Edgardo Colona =

Don Edgardo Colona (1846–1904) was the stage name of Edgar Chalmers, a hard-working lesser tragedian in British theater.

Colona grew up in Mexico, the son of a Scots mining engineer. He first appeared on a British stage at the age of eighteen, in a performance of Hamlet, and soon joined the Drury Lane company. Other Shakespearian roles included Richard the Third, Othello, and, in the eighteen-nineties, a disastrous Macbeth at the Old Vic. (As Don Edgardo was about to enact the murder of Duncan, an audience member shouted "Go home! And leave the poor old king alone!") Colona also wrote or adapted a number of plays, the most successful of which were Crime and Atonement and Don John of Seville, a blank verse work first performed at the Elephant and Castle Theater in 1876.
