= Highpoint (building) =

Residential skyscraper in London

Coordinates: 51.4924°N 0.1025°W

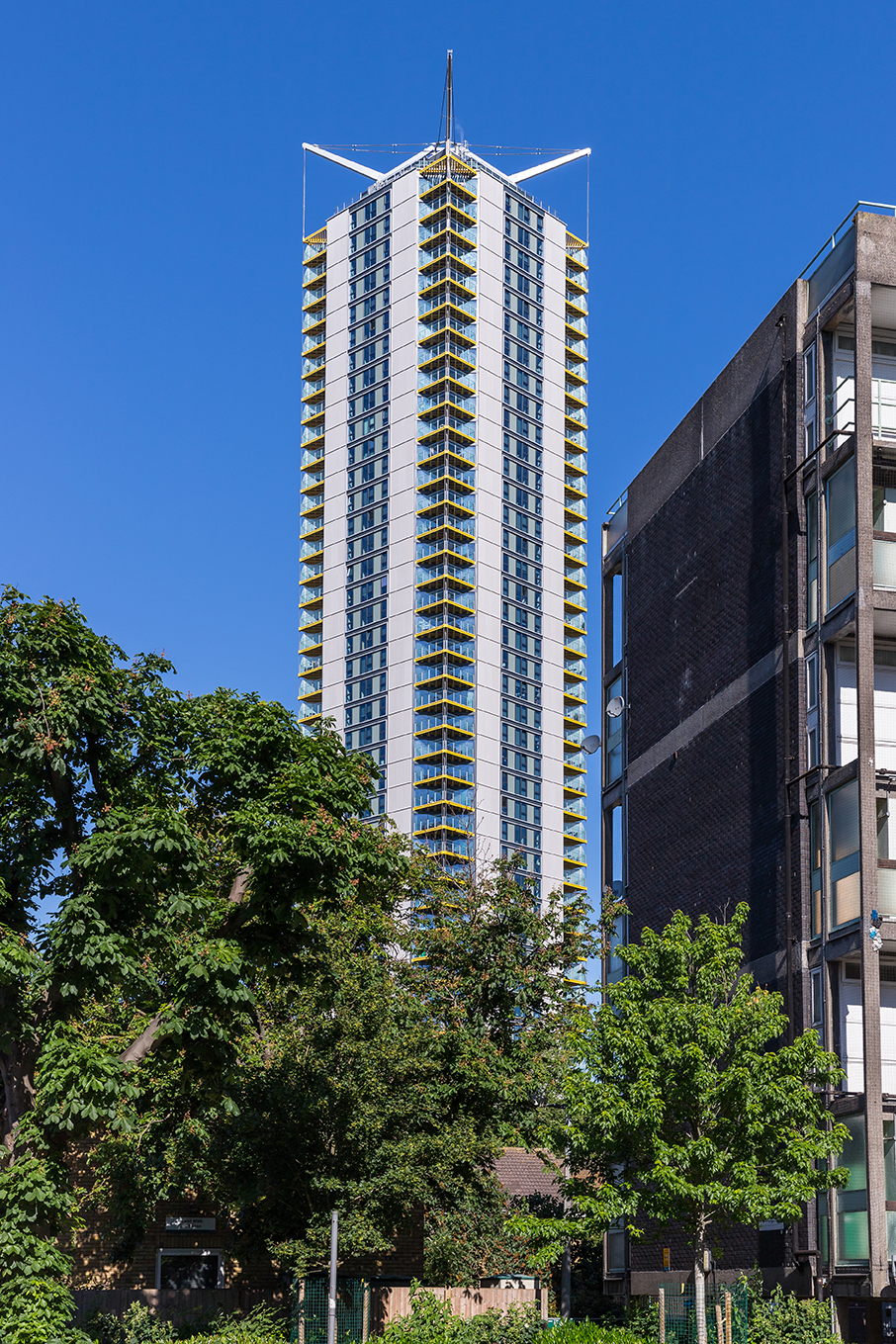
- Highpoint in 2021

General information
- Status: Completed
- Type: Residential
- Location: Churchyard Row, Southwark; London, SE11; United Kingdom
- Construction started: 2014
- Completed: 2018
- Operator: Realstar Living, Peabody Trust

Height
- Roof: 142

Technical details
- Floor count: 46

Design and construction
- Architect: Rogers Stirk Harbour + Partners
- Developer: First Base
- Main contractor: Mace

Highpoint (officially Castilla, also 80 Newington Butts and UNCLE Elephant & Castle, and previously referred to as 360 London) is a 142-metre, 46-storey, 458-apartment residential skyscraper in Elephant and Castle in the London Borough of Southwark in London on the site of the London Park Hotel.

It was the tallest build-to-rent development in the country at the time of construction, and one of London's tallest residential buildings.

On completion in 2018, 343 one- and two-bedroom apartments were made available for rent to private tenants. The building features a 24/7 gym, and a "sky lounge" on the 45th floor, with a bar, kitchen and co-working space, accessible by residents only.

The building is managed by Canadian real estate manager Realstar Living under its UK brand UNCLE. It is one of 5 properties managed by the company in London. They have another one in Manchester.

Under previous plans the privately rented apartments were to be managed by Essential Living. The other 115 units are rented as affordable housing units by the Peabody Trust.

A 300-seat flexible theatre space located in the building has been leased to the Southwark Playhouse, and it opened as a venue in January 2023.

The site also features a commercial unit, currently operating as a branch of a healthy-living cafe bar chain of two establishments, called Nue Ground.

The Highpoint building

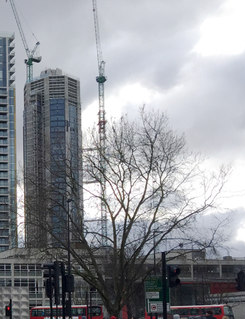
Under Construction, 2017

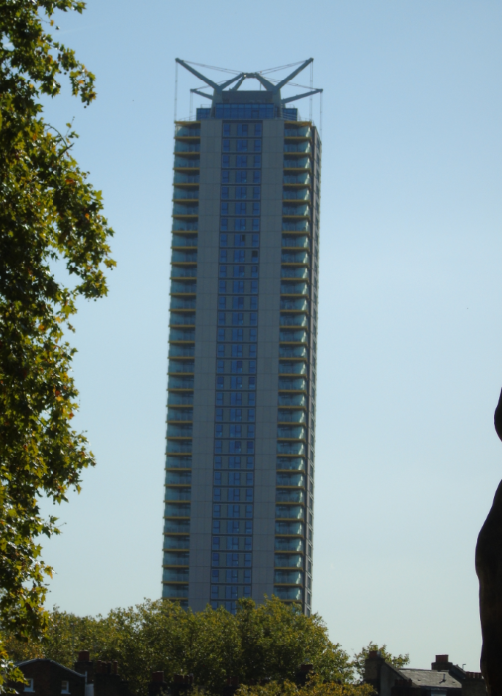
The building in 2019

== Articles ==
- Green light for Elephant & Castle tower and theatre, London SE1, 5 Sep 2007
- Elephant & Castle 360 tower project to be revived, London SE1, 3 March 2011
- Mayor announces ‘affordable flats’ tower at Elephant and Castle, London SE1 31, July 2013
- Government could pour more cash into Elephant & Castle skyscraper, London SE1, 11 March 2014

== See also ==
- List of tallest buildings in the United Kingdom
- Build-to-rent
