= Elephant and Castle =

Area in London, England

Coordinates: 51°29′39″N 00°05′59″W

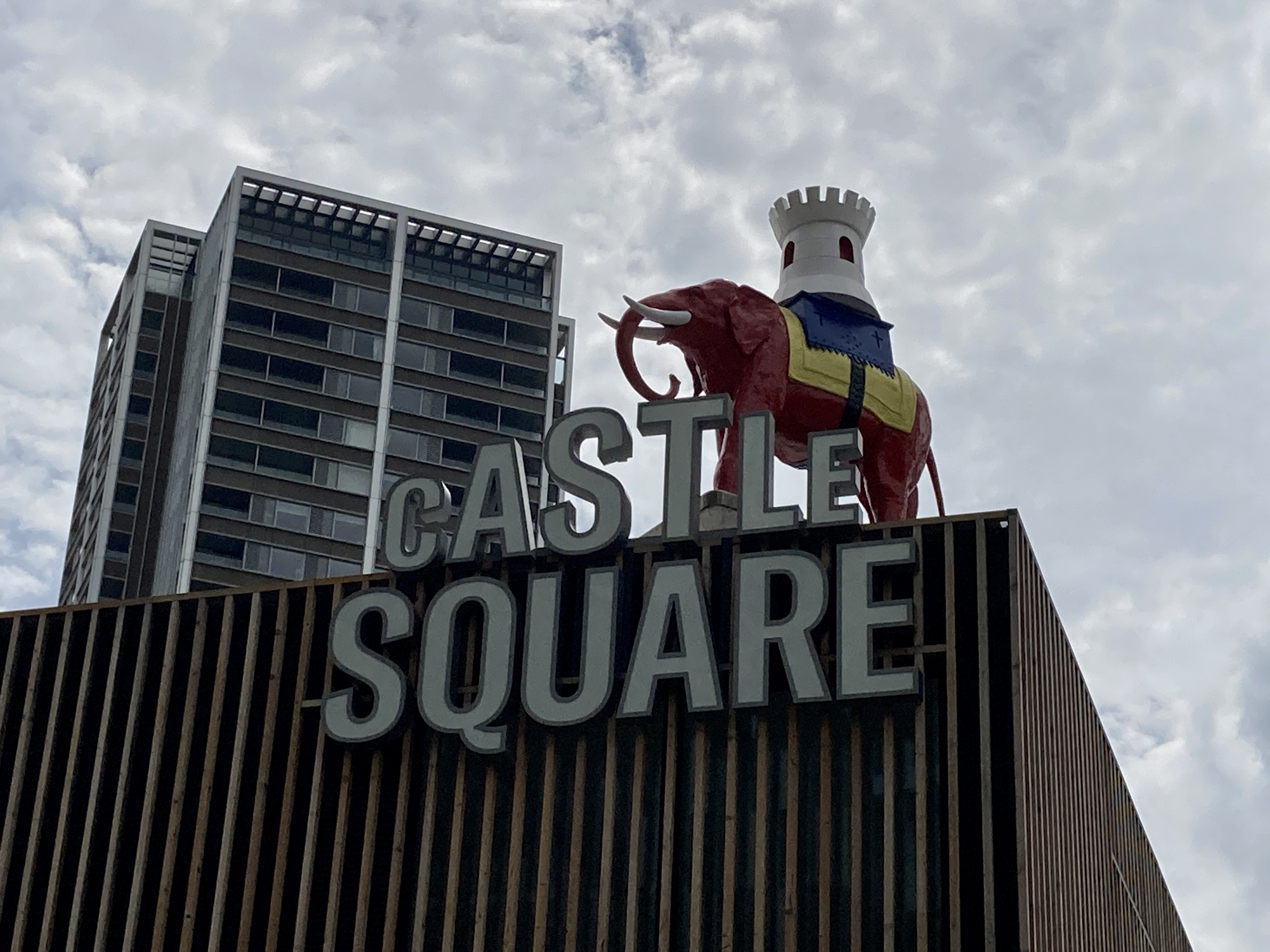
- The Elephant & Castle statue, salvaged from the Victorian pub of the same name

- Location within Greater London
- OS grid reference: TQ319789
- London borough: Southwark
- Ceremonial county: Greater London
- Region: London
- Country: England
- Sovereign state: United Kingdom
- Post town: LONDON
- Postcode district: SE1, SE11, SE17
- Dialling code: 020
- Police: Metropolitan
- Fire: London
- Ambulance: London
- UK Parliament: Bermondsey and Old Southwark; Peckham
- London Assembly: Lambeth and Southwark

Elephant and Castle is an area of south London, England, in the London Borough of Southwark. The name also informally refers to much of Walworth and Newington, due to the proximity of the London Underground station of the same name. The name is derived from a local coaching inn.

The major traffic junctions here are connected by a short road called Elephant and Castle, which is part of the A3. Traffic runs to and from Kent along the A2 (New Kent Road and Old Kent Road), much of the south of England on the A3, to the West End via St George's Road, and to the City of London via London Road and Newington Causeway at the northern junction. Newington Butts and Walworth Road adjoin the southern junction. It forms part of the London Inner Ring Road and the boundary of the London congestion charge zone.

The subterranean River Neckinger, which originates in Geraldine Mary Harmsworth Park, flows east under the area towards St Saviour's Dock where it enters the Thames. The area was significantly remodelled in the 1960s as part of post-war reconstruction. A new wave of redevelopment began in the late 2000s with the demolition of the brutalist Heygate Estate. The various phases of the project are due to last until the late 2020s. The demolition of the shopping centre and The Coronet took place in 2021.

The Elephant has two linked London Underground stations, on the Northern and Bakerloo lines, and a National Rail station served by limited Southeastern services and Thameslink suburban loop line services to Mitcham, Sutton and Wimbledon, and services to Kentish Town and St. Albans to Orpington or Sevenoaks via Catford.

== Notable buildings and institutions ==
Skipton House, home of Public Health England; a large part of the London South Bank University campus; the London College of Communication (part of UAL), home to the Stanley Kubrick Archive; the Ministry of Sound nightclub; the Imperial War Museum, which sits in Geraldine Mary Harmsworth Park; the Michael Faraday Memorial in Elephant Square; the Siobhan Davies Studios, an award-winning Victorian school conversion by Sarah Wigglesworth; West Square; the original Bakerloo Line depot; the Inner London Crown Court; the Revolving Doors Agency; the London School of Musical Theatre; the Baitul Aziz Islamic Cultural Centre, the Cinema Museum; and the Metropolitan Tabernacle. The Cuming Museum is nearby on Walworth Road. A K2 model phone box from 1927, designed by Giles Gilbert Scott and located on the southern side of New Kent Road, which was moved a few metres and reinstalled at the entrance of Ash Avenue in 2021, is a Grade II listed structure since 1986.

== Name ==
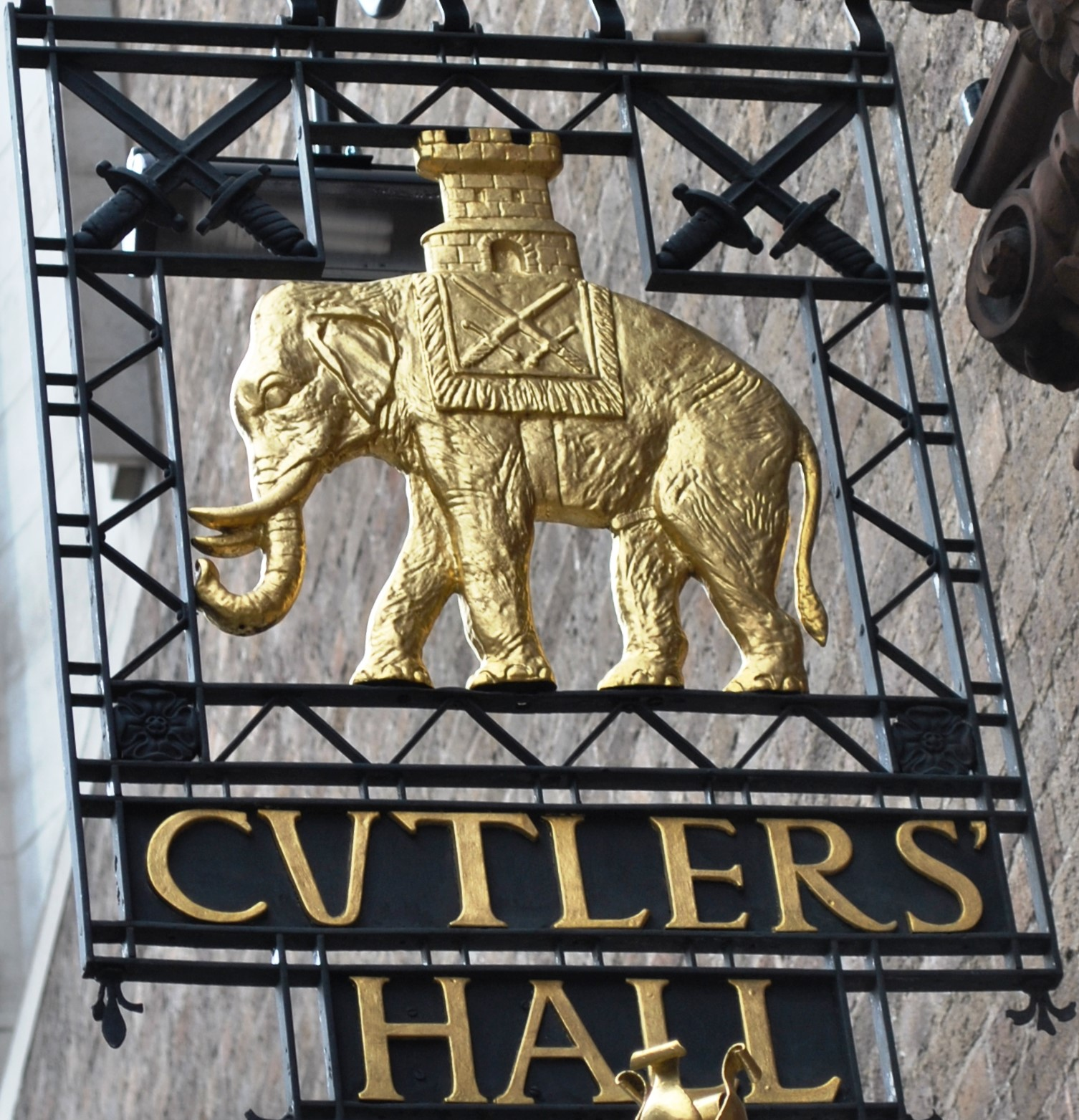
The crest of the Worshipful Company of Cutlers.

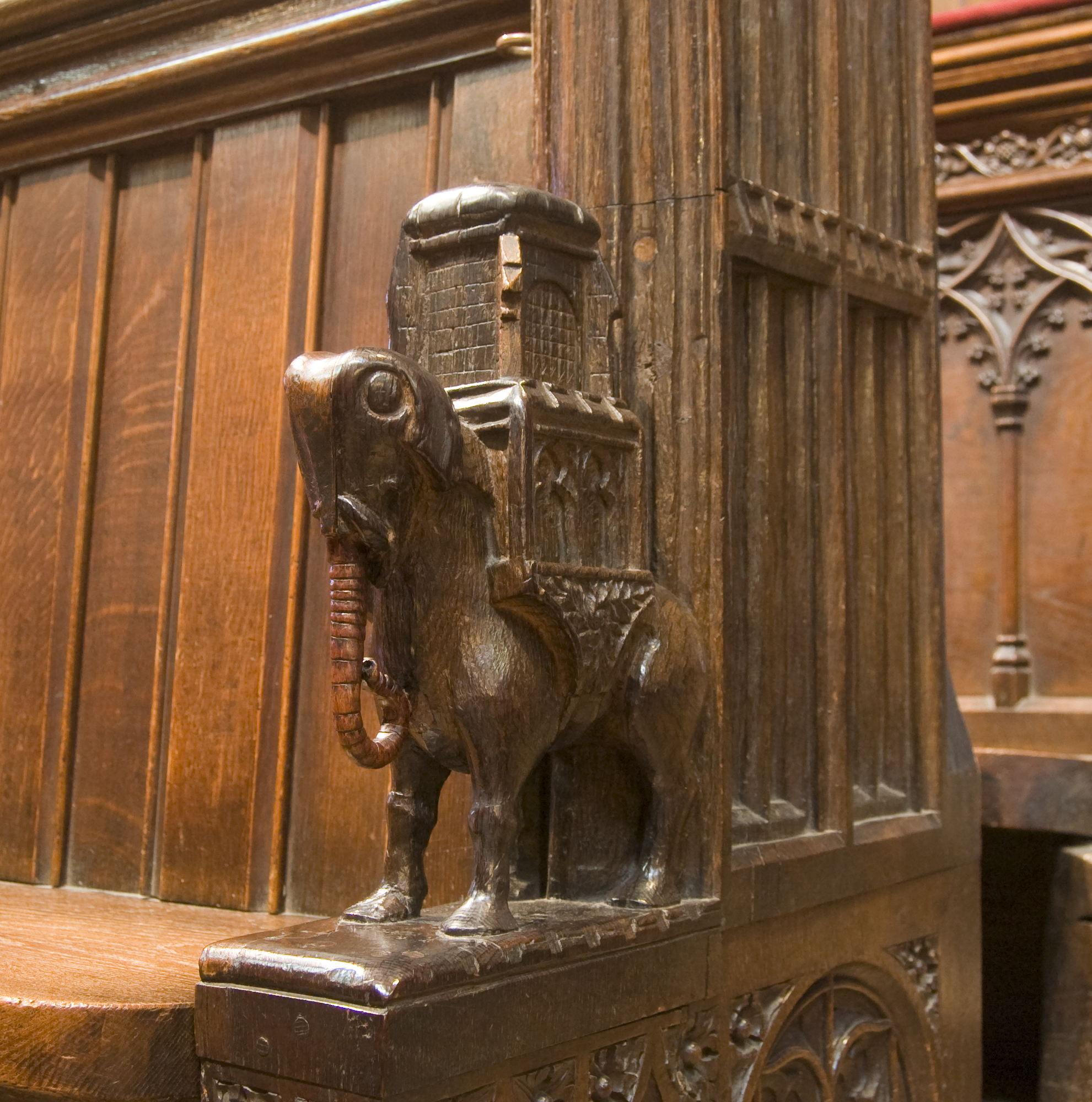
The "elephant and castle" from the 14th-century choir stalls in Chester Cathedral

The name "Elephant and Castle" is derived from the name of a pub/coaching inn located at this major crossroad. The earliest surviving record of this name in relation to this area appears in the Court Leet Book of the Manor of Walworth, which met at "Elephant and Castle, Newington" on 21 March 1765.

The inn was rebuilt in 1816 and again in 1898, and the present Elephant & Castle pub, at the junction of New Kent Road and Newington Causeway, was part of 1960s comprehensive redevelopment. The Victorian pub was demolished.

Newington, which was the name of the village forming the basis to the neighbourhood before the inn's name took over, is a common place name in England. (Note: In today's London alone, the other instances are Newington Green and Stoke Newington) London quickly expanded into the northern parts of the parish from 1750 to 1830. By the end of the 19th century ten daughter parishes had arisen in Newington including its secondary manor, Walworth. No notable upper, lower, or hill parts of the ancient parish nor compass points have been used, so to locate businesses and homes without reference to traditional saints divisions, many people popularised the informal name, of the notable public house. Other instances in Inner London are 'Angel' at Islington and Bricklayers Arms at the east end of New Kent Road.

=== The myths of the Infanta and the Cutlers' Company ===
The popular and enduring idea that the inn itself derives its name from an English corruption of the phrase La Infanta de Castilla, as a reference to Eleanor of Castile, has been debunked by local historian Stephen Humphrey in his 2013 book Elephant and Castle, a History. However, still under dispute is a connection with another Princess of Castilla, Catherine d'Aragon, first wife of Henry VIII, who when first arrived into London in 1502, took lodging into a house on South Bank, which would later become the residence of the architect Christopher Wren. This building is about a mile and a half from where Elephant and Castle roundabout stands today.

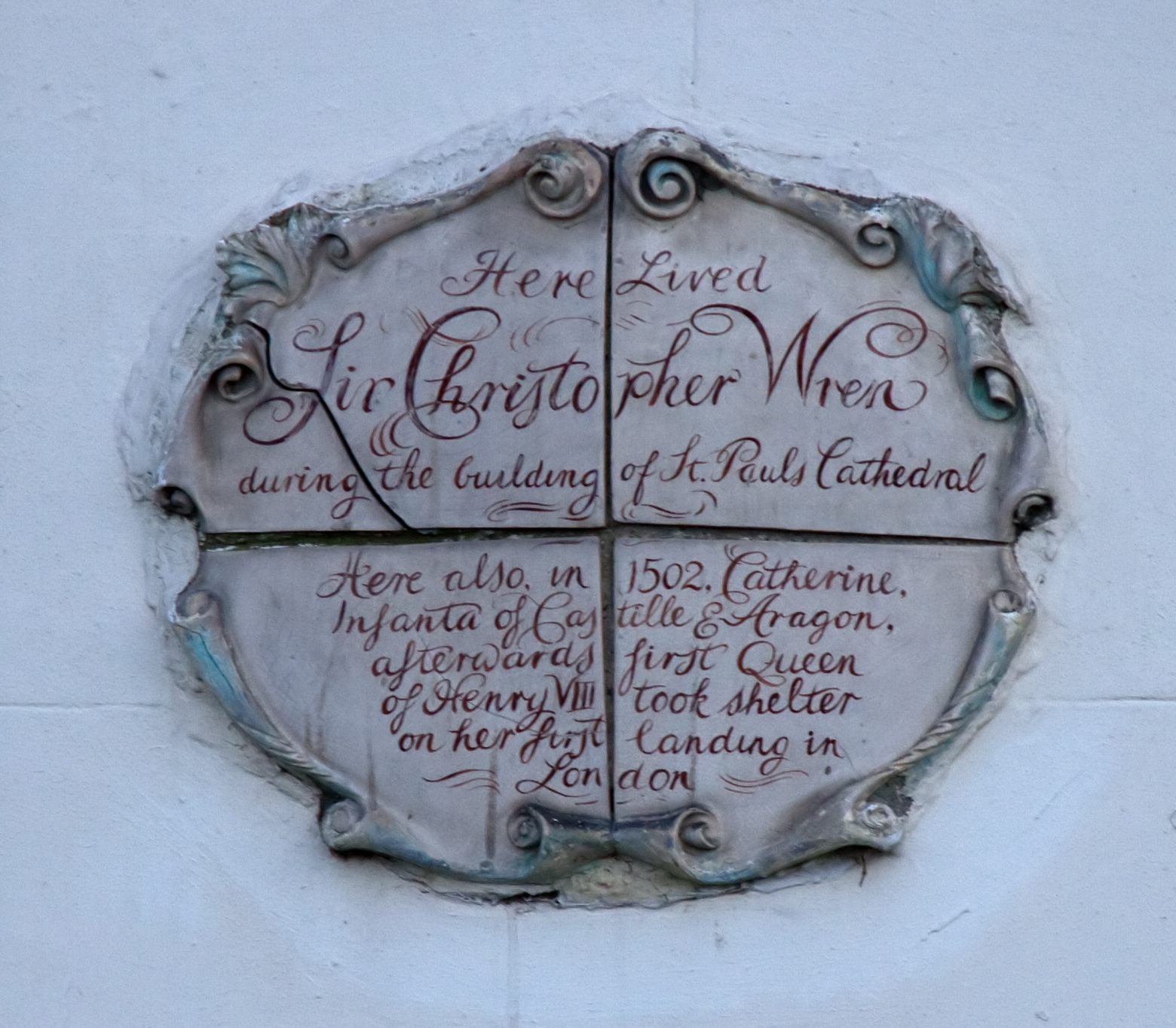
The Infanta de Castilla house's plaque in London South Bank

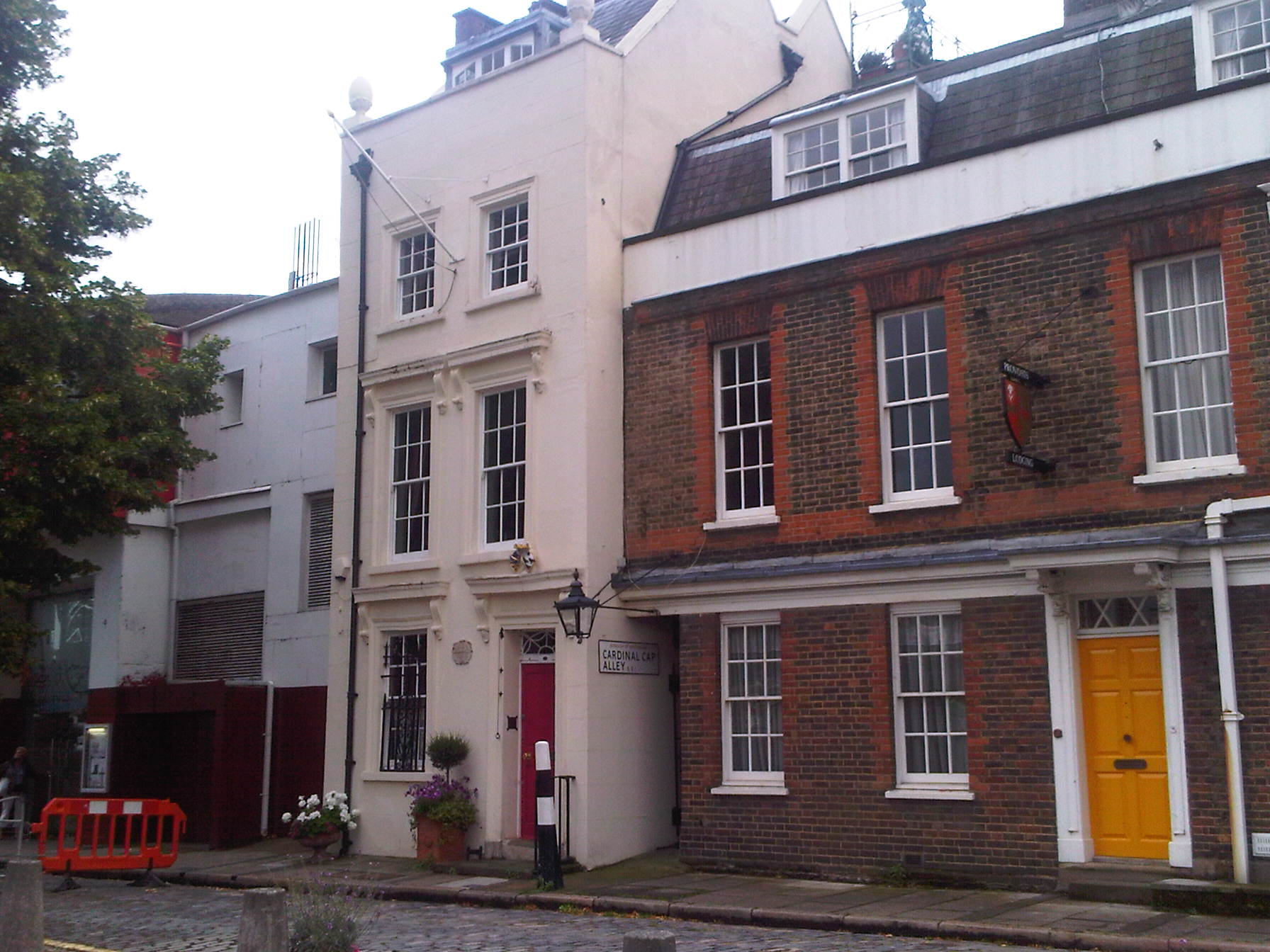
The Infanta de Castilla house in London

According to Stephen Humphrey, after examining how the image of an elephant with a castle on its back has been popular for centuries and throughout Europe (the earliest example predating Queen Eleanor by 1,500 years), and pointing out the fact that the sign only begins to be used in the area about 500 years after Eleanor was alive, he states:

The story of Queen Eleanor in relation to the Elephant and Castle is therefore a myth. It is wildly anachronistic both in respect of the sign in general and in its specific use in Newington, and she has no connection with the sign or with the place.

The author also refutes the claim that the pub name derives from the Cutlers' Company. First he notes:

The sign was adopted by the Cutlers' Company of the City of London, because of the use of ivory in the handles of cutlery. The Royal African Company of 1672 likewise used the sign due to the ivory trade.

Prior to the public house's appearance in the records in 1765, John Flaxman had been allowed to build a workshop on the site around 1642. Stephen Humphrey describes him as a smith or farrier. Thirty years later another farrier is cited as lessee of the site, which is now known as the White Horse. The building is first described as a public house called the Elephant and Castle with a licensee called George Frost in 1765, although this may not have been the year of opening. The author adds:

We can only say that the Elephant and Castle pub existed without doubt from 1765 and may have been founded under that name by George Frost as early as 1754.

Stephen Humphrey explains that George Frost's name appears in other manor and vestry records

but he made no appearance in the records of the Farriers' Company and was not included among the apprentices of the Cutlers' Company. There is no evidence to connect him with the shoeing of horses, the cutlery trade or with another pub elsewhere before he arrived at Newington. The sudden appearance of the ancient sign under his proprietorship cannot be explained by his career. As with the vast majority of pub names, the choice in this case was probably a random one.

== History ==
=== Medieval and early modern ===
Known previously as Newington (Newington Butts and Newington Causeway are two of the principal roads of the area), in the medieval period it was part of rural Surrey, in the manor of Walworth. This is listed in the Domesday Book as belonging to the Archbishop of Canterbury; the income from its rents and tithes supplied the monks at Christ Church Canterbury with their clothing, and a 'church' is mentioned. The parish was called St Mary, Newington, which church occupied the southwest side of today's southern roundabout, near the Tabernacle, and was first recorded by name in 1222.

In May 1557, William Morant, Stephen Gratwick and a man named King, known as the Southwark Martyrs, were burnt at the stake in St George's Field on the site of the present Tabernacle during the Marian Persecutions.

St Mary's Church was rebuilt in 1720 and completely replaced in 1790, to a design of Francis Hurlbatt. Within another hundred years this too was to be demolished, with its replacement on Kennington Park Road ready in 1876. It was destroyed by bombing in 1940 during the Second World War. The remains of the tower and an arch were incorporated into its replacement of 1958. The open space is still known as St Mary's Churchyard, and the narrow pedestrian walk at its south end is Churchyard Row.

There is record of a 'hospital' before the Reformation. In 1601 the Worshipful Company of Fishmongers erected St Peter's Hospital on the site of the present London College of Communication. This expanded and survived until 1850, when it was removed to Wandsworth. The Drapers' livery company created Walters' Almshouses on a site now at the southern junction island in 1640, giving the tower block opposite the name Draper House. The almshouses were relocated to Brandon Street in the 1960s as part of the major redevelopment.

=== Rise to metropolitan prominence (1750–1900) ===
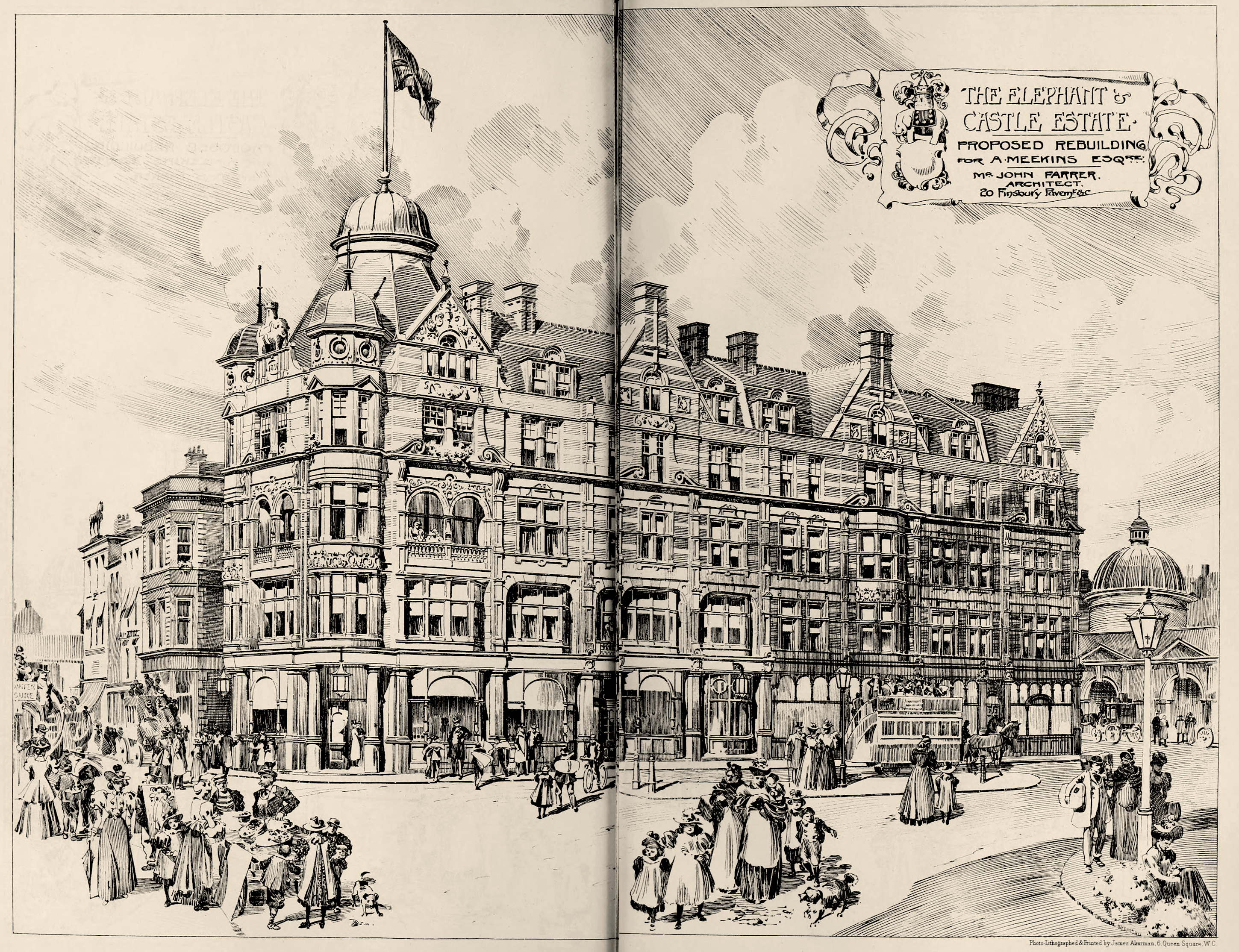
The Elephant and Castle Hotel as rebuilt in 1898

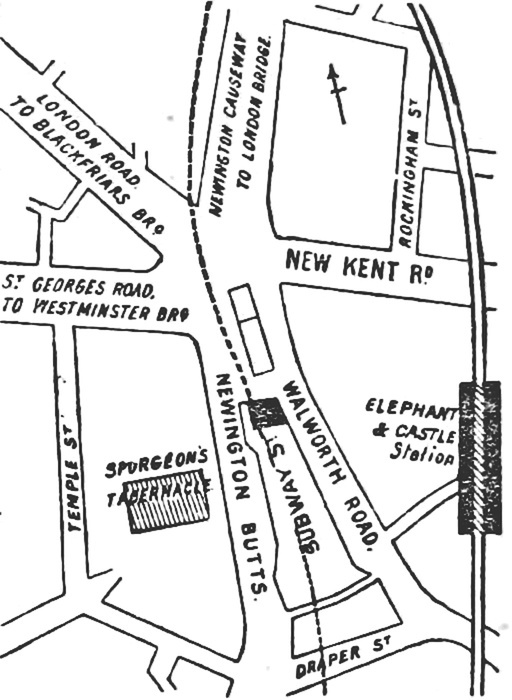
Street layout in 1888

The neighbourhood became urbanised and somewhat commercial after the building of Westminster Bridge in 1751 and the improvements to London Bridge in the same period. These required 'by-pass' roads across the south side approaches to each other and also to the main routes to the south and southeast coasts. These road improvements – Great Dover Street, Westminster Bridge, New Kent Road, St George's Road and Borough Road – connect to the older Kennington and Old Kent Roads to facilitate this traffic. In 1769 the new Blackfriars Bridge was connected to this system at what is now St George's Circus and Blackfriars Road (originally Great Surrey Road) and to the Elephant junction with the new London Road. As a result of these improvements, the area became a built-up part of the metropolis during the late Georgian and Victorian periods.

The railway arrived here in 1863 and the first deep-level tube line, now part of the Northern line's City Branch, in 1890. The Bakerloo line terminus was created in 1906. The middle-class and working-class populations increased, the first settling on the major roads, the latter on the streets behind these. The area declined socio-economically in much of the Walworth (south-east) side as work in London Docklands shifted further east and became more mechanised, and the regional-level railway yard work decreased (see Bricklayers Arms railway station).

In the 19th century the nationally famed Baptist preacher Charles Haddon Spurgeon built the Metropolitan Tabernacle here. The building, designed by William Willmer Pocock, was finished in 1861 and dedicated on 18 March. It was bombed in the bombing of London but the portico and basement survived. In 1957 the tabernacle was rebuilt to a new, much smaller design, accommodating surviving original features.

The Theatre Royal was built in 1872 and destroyed by fire only six years later. Renovations were initiated by Jethro Thomas Robinson after the fire, and completed by Frank Matcham, to what became the Elephant and Castle Theatre in 1879. The Theater was converted to an ABC cinema in 1928, and became The Coronet Cinema in 1981.

During the late 19th century there was a cemetery in the vicinity, but it was built over during London's rapid expansion. A few gravestones remain in St. Mary's Churchyard. At the north side of the churchyard, the church of St Gabriel's Newington was built in 1874 before being demolished in 1937 on what is now a walkway called St Gabriel Walk.

== 20th century ==
=== Peak years: 1900–1939 ===
The area became the location for a thriving shopping area, known as "the Piccadilly (Circus) of South London", with its own department store (William Tarn and Co) and many smaller outlets. Also featured were a shoe factory, a branch of Burton and a renowned hatter.

In 1930, the Trocadero, a monumental neo-Renaissance style picture house seating over 3000 and fitted with the largest Wurlitzer organ imported to the United Kingdom, was built at the northern corner of the New Kent Road (a plaque commemorating the building was unveiled in 2008 by Denis Norden, who had worked there in his youth). This was replaced in 1966 by a smaller cinema (the Odeon, known for a time after closure as an Odeon in 1982 as the Coronet, not to be confused with the Coronet below) which was demolished in 1988.

In 1932, another cinema opened across the street, The Coronet. From the early to mid 2000s until its eventual closure for impending demolition, The Coronet building was mostly used as a night-club and concert venue.

At the time it seated over 2000 people, and was an art-deco conversion of the Elephant and Castle theatre, opened in 1879 on the site of the short-lived Theatre Royal (built in 1872 and burnt down six years later). It was reconstructed in 1882 and again in 1902.

One monument to cinema still remains just off the Elephant, the Cinema Museum is a volunteer-run museum with screenings of classic cinema and a vast collection of cinema memorabilia. It is located in the old workhouse where Charlie Chaplin spent time as a child.

==== Second World War ====
The Elephant was the centre of the target zone for the German air raids on London on 10 May 1941 and suffered "raging fires".

==== Post-war rebuilding (1945–2000) ====
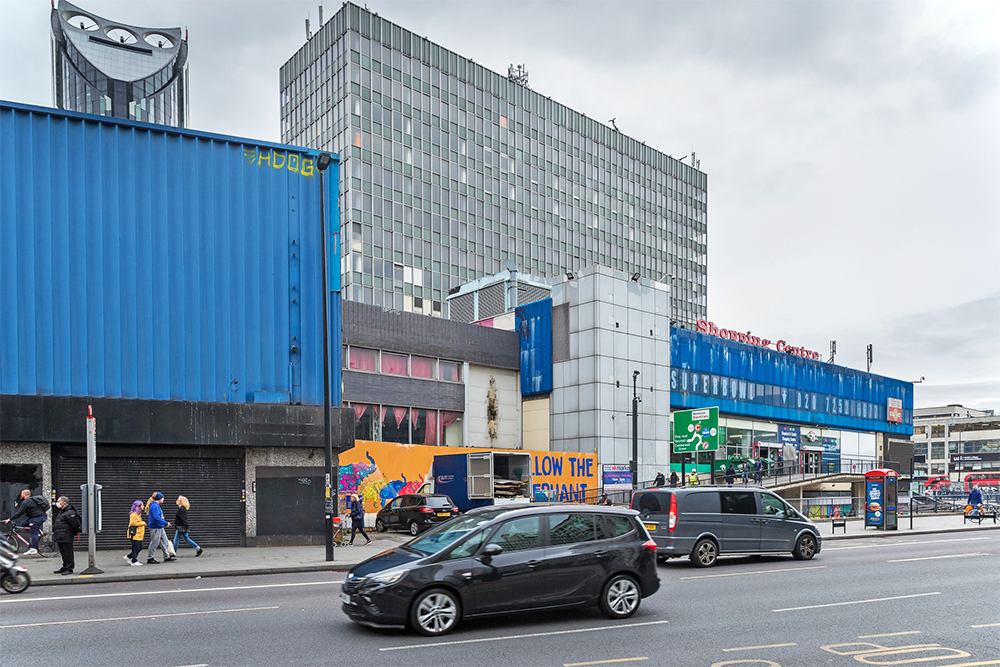
The Elephant and Castle shopping centre, Hannibal House and The Coronet in September 2020

The major development of the 1960s consisted of post-war reconstruction to a larger metropolitan plan, much of it replacing properties destroyed by bombing in World War II and creating two infamous roundabouts.

The Metropolitan Tabernacle was reconstructed behind its preserved classical facade to a smaller scale than the original. Alexander Fleming House (1959), originally a group of government office blocks and now Metro Central Heights residential complex, is a prime example of the work of the Hungarian modernist architect Ernő Goldfinger.

The shopping centre, designed by Boissevain & Osmond for the Willets Group, was opened in March 1965. It was the first covered shopping mall in Europe, with 120 shops on three levels and a two-storey underground car-park. In the sales brochure (1963), Willets claimed it to be the "largest and most ambitious shopping venture ever to be embarked upon in London. In design planning and vision it represents an entirely new approach to retailing, setting standards for the sixties that will revolutionise shopping concepts throughout Britain." When it opened, budget restrictions meant that the proportions and finishes of the building had had to be scaled down and only 29 out of a possible 120 shops were trading. The demolition of the shopping centre and The Coronet took place in 2021.

The Elephant is the location of the London College of Communication, formerly the London College of Printing, an internationally renowned dedicated college, part of University of the Arts London. The present structure was constructed during the redevelopment of the area in the early 1960s. It is slated for demolition in the mid 2020s, when the college is due to move to a new campus being built on the site of the Coronet Theatre.

In 1974 the Brutalist Heygate Estate, designed by Tim Tinker, was completed. It was home to more than 3,000 people. The estate was once a popular place to live, the flats being thought light and spacious, but the estate later developed a reputation for crime, poverty and dilapidation. It was demolished in the 2010s and replaced with the Elephant Park development, which, the developer claimed, includes "the largest new green space to be created in London for 70 years."

Perronet House, an award-winning residential block owned by Southwark Council, was designed by Sir Roger Walters. It was completed in 1970 and extended in 1987.

At the south of the area stood Castle House (an office building now replaced by Strata SE1), which was part of the Draper Estaste. When Draper House, which still exists, was built in 1964, with its 25 floors, it was the tallest structure in London. The design was by Hubert Bennett of the London County Council's (LCC's) Architects Department and inspired by Le Corbusier. Well regarded at the time, the building was featured in Architecture Review which said it, 'sets a standard of clarity and vigour'.

=== 21st century: gentrification ===
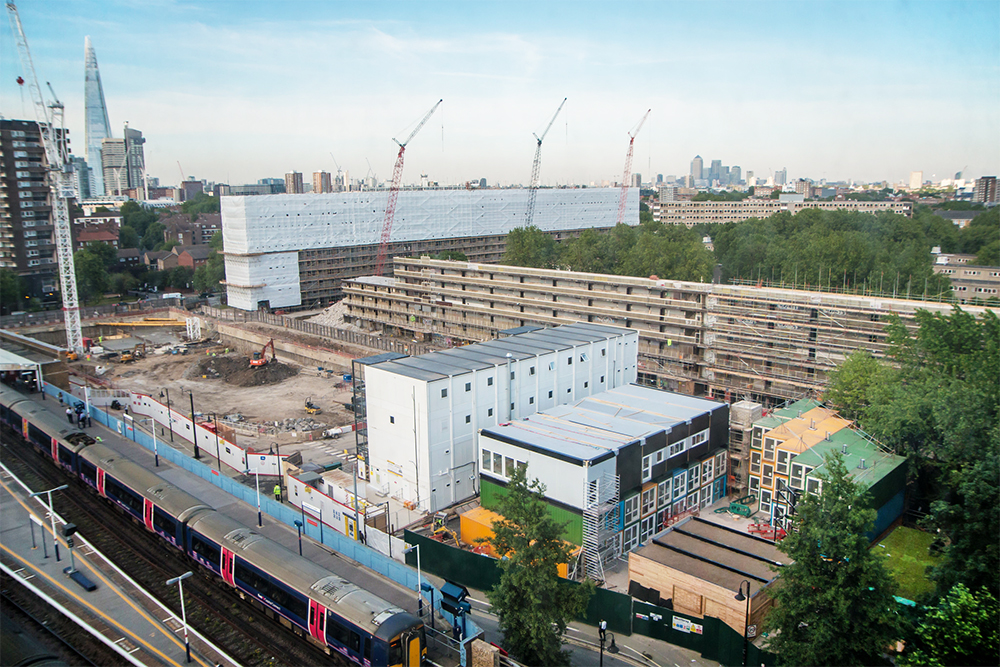
Demolition of the Heygate Estate, construction of Elephant Central, and the Artworks – May 2014

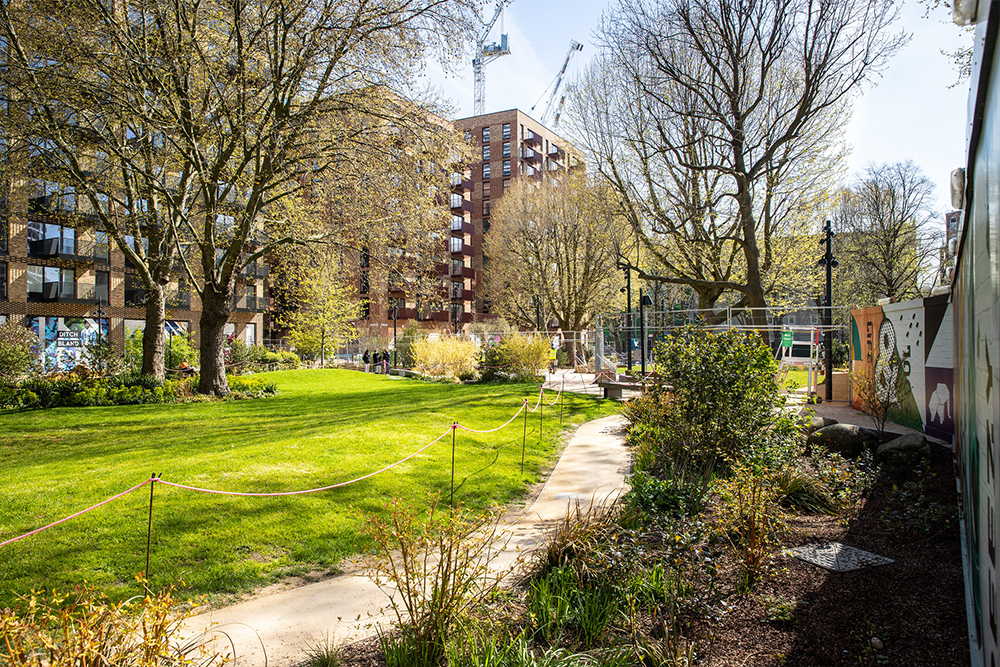
Elephant Park – former site of the Heygate Estate

In recent times the area has had a reputation for successful ethnic diversity and centrality. The area's proximity to major areas of employment, including Westminster, the West End and the City, has meant that a certain amount of gentrification has taken place.

From the mid-2000s, the area became the subject to a master-planned redevelopment budgeted at £1.5 billion. A Development Framework was approved by Southwark Council in 2004. It covers 170 acres (688,000 m^{2}) and envisages restoring the Elephant to the role of major urban hub for inner London that it occupied before World War II. There have been moves to protect the last of the architecturally important tenement blocks nearby through the creation of a conservation area covering the Pullens buildings.

A substantial amount of post-World War II social housing that was claimed to have failed by the Council has been demolished, including the Heygate Estate, replaced with developments consisting of a mix of social and private-sector housing and a 2-acres green space, Elephant Park, part of rebranding the whole development. This portion of the site is being developed by Lendlease. The site includes what the developers called "one of the largest new parks in Central London in 70 years", which only became part of the project after protests from local activists to retain as many of the mature trees on the site as possible. A large water feature and paddling pool, named Elephant Springs, is located in the north eastern quarter of the park.

In 2022, a timber pavilion, called The Tree House, and designed by architect studio Bell Phillips, opened. The structure is triangular and is built around a tree. It includes public toilets, a cafe, and a viewing gallery on the roof.

Locally, tall, mainly residential buildings have been approved or are under construction since the 148-metre Strata SE1 tower was completed in 2010. These include:

- One The Elephant (124m)
- Highpoint a residential build-to-rent building (134m), which also includes affordable housing, Council housing, a café and a theatre space leased to the Southwark Playhouse.
- "Two Fifty One" (Note: on the site of Eileen House) Southwark Bridge Road (134m)
- "Elephant Central" (three high-rise buildings on a shared podium).

Southwark Council opened the new Castle leisure centre in 2016. This replaced the original Castle centre, which closed in 2012.

In 2015, the new owners of the shopping centre, Delancey, announced redevelopment plans for a new "town centre", which is due to be completed by the mid-2020s. The project is in two phases. The first aims to replace the existing shopping centre and the Coronet Theatre, and comprise:

- a new campus building for the nearby London College of Communication (LCC) (Note: replacing the Coronet Theatre)
- a cinema (Note: originally planned for the "Elephant Central" development)
- retail units and housing.
- a new underground station entrance, though funding is currently uncertain.

Once the first phase is completed, the current site of the LCC is to be redeveloped to host residential towers and a live-music venue.

In February 2014, a small shipper-container precinct on three levels, inspired by the Boxpark concept, was put together at the corner of the Walworth Road and Elephant Road. Baptised The Artworks, the venue hosted small start-up businesses and a library. The project was closed and demolished in 2019.

London's Latin American population, prominent from this zone to Stockwell, has been an inspiration to aspects of the regeneration. Plans are being made for shops and artwork to emphasise a Latin American corridor.

In December 2018, it was announced that London Mayor Sadiq Khan had approved redevelopment plans, and that Southwark Council had too, after changes to proposals to ensure more windows in the shopping centre, 350 out of 1000 homes for rent at "genuinely affordable levels" and for traders in the current centre with rents capped for 15 years. A judicial review of the decision was finally lost by campaigners in May 2021.

In January 2020, a closure date was set for the centre of 30 July 2020. The closure date was postponed to 24 September 2020 due to the COVID-19 pandemic. and the centre will be redeveloped. Demolition of the shopping centre, Hannibal House and the Coronet theatre started in January 2021.

In November 2023, Elephant Park was the winner of the Public Space – Building Beauty Award, handed out by the Royal Fine Art Commission Trust.

== Transport ==
=== London Underground ===
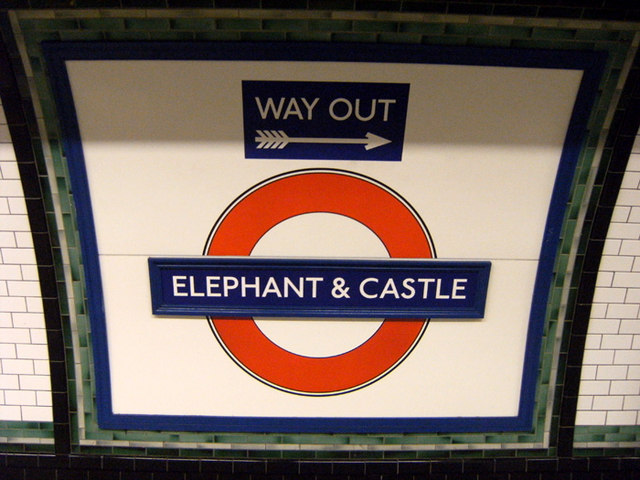
Elephant & Castle National Rail station is approximately 100 metres from the nearby tube station. There is an out-of-station interchange between the two stations.

Elephant & Castle tube station serves the area.

The station is served by Northern line trains on the Bank branch, linking the area directly to the City, and destinations such as London Bridge, King's Cross St Pancras, and Camden Town to the north. Southbound trains travel towards Morden via key destinations such as Kennington, Clapham, and South Wimbledon and Battersea following the opening of the line's extension from Kennington as of the Autumn of 2021.

The station is the southern terminus of the Bakerloo line, which runs northbound to Harrow and Wealdstone. The line links the area to Waterloo, the West End, Paddington, Willesden, and Wembley Central along the way.

The station is on the boundary between London fare zones 1 and 2.

Transport for London (TfL) has proposed extending the Bakerloo line southwards from Elephant & Castle to Lewisham. The line would run beneath the Old Kent Road down to New Cross.

=== National Rail ===
Elephant & Castle railway station is served by Southeastern and Thameslink trains (More so by Thameslink services), which serve destinations across London, the South East, and East England. Key destinations include Ashford International, Bedford, Dover Priory, London Blackfriars (in the city), Luton and Luton Airport, St Albans City, St Pancras International, Sutton, and Wimbledon.

The station is on the boundary between London fare zones 1 and 2.

=== Buses ===
Elephant & Castle is served by London Buses routes 1, 12, 35, 40, 53, 63, 68, 133, 136, 148, 155, 171, 172, 176, 188, 196, 333, 343, 344, 360, 363, 415, 453, 468, C10, BL1, P5, N1, N53, N63, N68, N89, N133, N155, N171 and N343.

=== Cycling ===
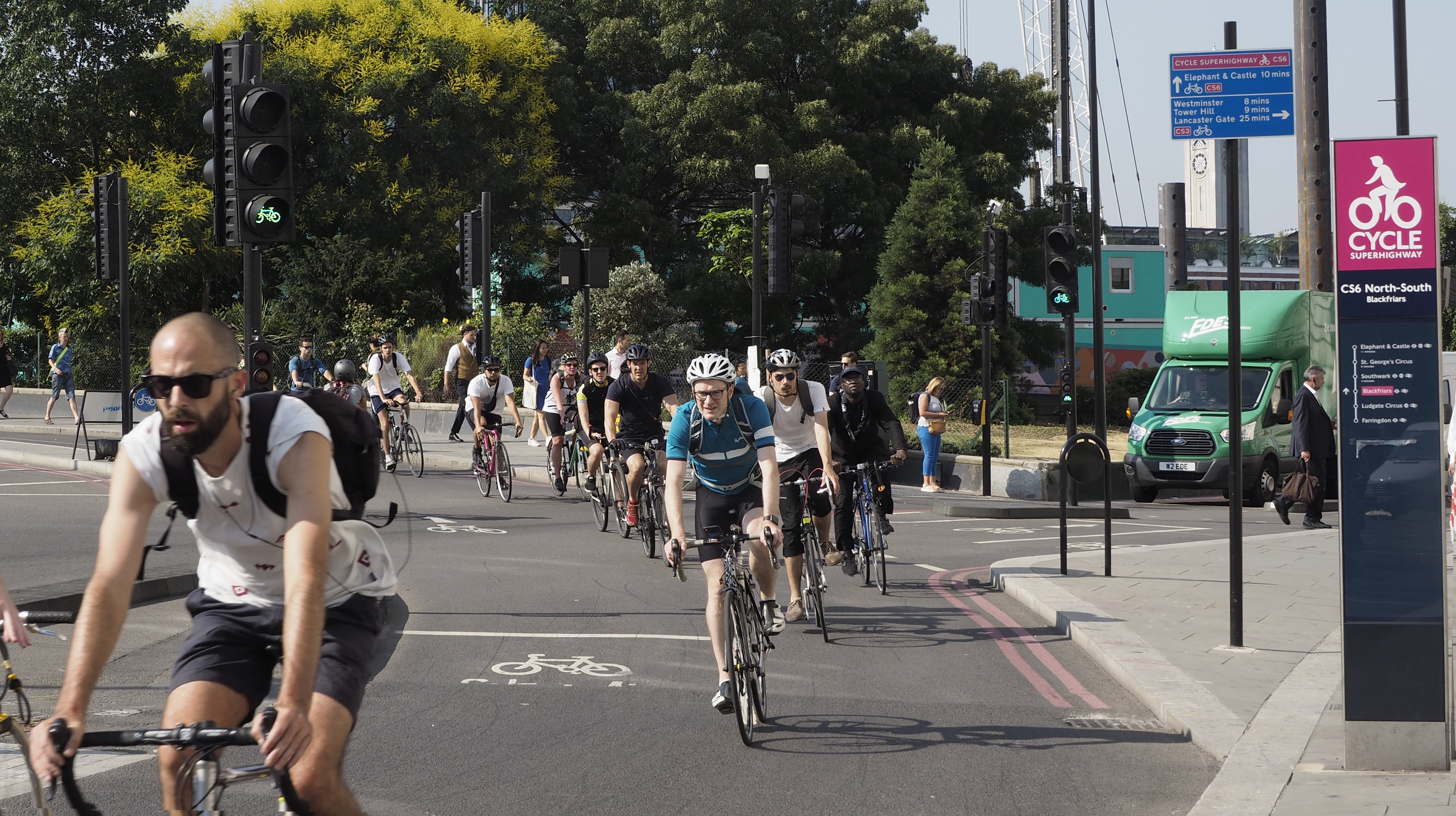
Cycleway 6 meets Cycle Superhighway 7 at Elephant & Castle. The route runs on traffic-free bike freeway to Farringdon, via the South Bank and City of London.

TfL and the London Borough of Southwark maintain cycling infrastructure in the area.

In 2014 the northern junction was "Britain's highest cycle casualty roundabout".

Elephant and Castle is the southern terminus of Cycleway 6, which runs northwards to Blackfriars, Farringdon, Bloomsbury, and King's Cross. The cycleway runs unbroken and signposted along the entirety of its route. The section between Elephant and Castle and Farringdon runs along traffic-free bike freeway. The northern terminus of C6 is in Kentish Town.

Cycle Superhighway 7 passes north–south through Elephant and Castle. The route is signposted and carries cyclists from Elephant and Castle northbound to the city, via Southwark Bridge. Southbound, the route runs without interruption to Collier's Wood, via Kennington, Stockwell, Clapham, and Tooting.

A shared-use path for pedestrians and cyclists runs alongside New Kent Road east from Elephant and Castle, which links the area to the nearby Bricklayer's Arms.

The Santander Cycles bicycle-sharing system operates in Elephant and Castle.

=== Road ===
Elephant and Castle is a busy road junction. The London Inner Ring Road passes through the junction. The A3 also passes through the junction, which carries traffic between the city and destinations such as Kennington, Clapham, Gatwick Airport, and Portsmouth.

Air pollution from road traffic in Elephant and Castle has significantly improved in recent years. In 2015, Elephant and Castle exceeded the UK government legal limit on Nitrogen Dioxide, with the local borough recording an annual mean concentration of 41 micrograms per cubic metre (μg/m^3). In 2017, this figure was 34μg/m^3, below the legal limit, and in 2018, the figure was 32μg/m^3. The limit set by the Department for Environment, Food, and Rural Affairs is 40μg/m^3.

The Elephant was to have been served by the Cross-River Tram, which was cancelled in 2008 due to budgetary constraints.

In 2010, the southern roundabout was converted to traffic light operation, with the creation of new cycle lanes and pedestrian crossings. This included the removal of the pedestrian subways, described as "unpopular and imtimidating" by a local councillor.

In 2014 the Elephant & Castle junction was still "Britain's highest cycle casualty roundabout", prompting a TfL proposal to remove the northern roundabout as part of a £4bn package of road improvements targeting cyclists' safety. TfL implemented its proposal in 2015, connecting the roundabout island to the shopping centre, thereby creating a new public space called Elephant Square.

== Notable residents ==
- Playwright and associate of Shakespeare Thomas Middleton lived in the area in later life and was buried in St Mary's Churchyard when he died in 1627.
- The Forty Elephants or Forty Thieves were an 18th to 20th century all-female London crime syndicate who specialised in shoplifting. They operated from the Elephant and Castle and were allied to the Elephant and Castle Mob led by the McDonald brothers. Shirley Pitts was "educated" by the gang, while Alice Diamond was one of its leaders, in the first half of the 20th century.
- Fanny Blood, a friend of Mary Wollstonecraft's, met in 1775, lived in Newington Butt. In 1777, Wollstonecraft persuaded her family to move to Walworth. She soon became a lodger of philosopher Thomas Taylor and his family, in Manor Place. Taylor became her tutor and by 1778, she was working as a paid companion for him. She moved in with the Blood family in 1782.
- The mathematician Charles Babbage was born in Walworth in 1791 and was baptised at St Mary's Newington. The family lived at 44 Crosby Row, which is now called Larcom Street. A blue plaque is visible at the corner of Larcom Street and Walworth Road.
- In the middle of Elephant Square, (Note: Formerly a second, namely, the northern roundabout) is the Michael Faraday Memorial, a large stainless steel box built in honour of Michael Faraday, who was born nearby in 1791. It contains an electrical substation for the Northern line. Alternative DJ Aphex Twin has long been rumoured to have lived for some time inside the monument, although this story has been debunked. He is also rumoured to have lived in a disused bank building on Newington Causeway (now demolished) in the 1990s.
- Elhanan Bicknell was a businessman and shipowner. He became one of the leading collectors of contemporary British art. Around 1809, he entered into partnership with his uncle John Walter Langton who was a tallow chandler at Newington Butts. The firm, which was located opposite St Mary's Church, become the leading oil merchants and spermaceti refiners in London by 1835. A friend and close business associate there at Newington Butts was fellow oil merchant and shipowner, Thomas Sturge, who was also a cement manufacturer, railway company director, social reformer and philanthropist. Thomas Sturge the elder had founded what was to become Thomas Sturge & Sons in the early 1780s. The business remained there until the 1840s.
- The inventor of the periodic table, John Newlands, was born on 26 November 1837, in West Square, just behind the Bethlem Hospital, which now houses the Imperial War Museum.
- On 18 March 1861, renowned Particular Baptist preacher Charles Spurgeon moved his congregation to the newly constructed purpose-built Metropolitan Tabernacle, which seated 5,000 people with standing room for another 1,000. It was the largest church edifice of its day. Spurgeon remained in charge of the church until his death in 1892.
- Liberal politician, banker and City merchant James Daniel Gilbert was born on 5 February 1864 and subsequently brought up in the ward of West Newington, which he later came to represent at the London County Council.
- Communist militant and trade union leader Jack Dash was born in Southwark on 23 February 1907, and grew up on Rockingham Street.
- Gangster "Mad" Frankie Fraser was born on Cornwall Road in Waterloo, London. At the age of five, he moved with his family to a flat on the Walworth Road.
- Actor Tod Slaughter took over the Elephant and Castle Theatre from 1924 until several months before its closure in 1927. His company revived Victorian "blood-and-thunder" melodramas to enthusiastic audiences. Slaughter also staged other types of production such as the annual Christmas pantomime, where he would cast prominent local personalities in bit-parts for audience recognition.
- By at least 1924, Barbadian-born physician, Pan-Africanist and co-founders of the League of Coloured Peoples Cecil Belfield Clarke practised at 112 Newington Causeway, as he would do for the rest of his professional career. He may have practised there as early as 1920. The square at the centre of the new "town centre" on the site of the former shopping centre was named after him in a public ceremony in March 2026. A blue plaque dedicated to him hangs on the side of Skipton House.
- English comedian, actor, writer and singer Charlie Drake was born there on 19 June 1925.
- On 17 January 1932, agriculturalist and Labour Co-operative politician Denis Carter was born in Elephant and Castle, where his parents, Albert and Annie Carter, worked in a tea warehouse and as an office cleaner, respectively.
- Speedway rider George Barclay was born in Elephant on 1 April 1935.
- Actor Alan Ford, who was born in Camberwell on 23 February 1938, grew up on the area.
- Rock singer Terry Dene was born in Lancaster Street on 20 December 1938.
- Actor Windsor Davies taught English and Maths at a school in Elephant and Castle.
- Journalist and war correspondent David Blundy grew up near Elephant and Castle in a house that was also the location of his father's antique store.
- DJ, club promoter and music producer Jeff Dexter was born 15 August 1946 in Lambeth Hospital and grew up in Newington Butts, moving to Camberwell Road when he was ten years old.
- In 1956, Austin Osman Spare moved to a flat situated above the loading bay of a Woolworths store at 56a Walworth Road. Aged 17, in May 1904, he had held his first public art exhibition in the foyer of the Newington Public Library on the same road.Baker, Phil (2011). Austin Osman Spare: The Life and Legend of London's Lost Artist. London: Strange Attractor Press. ISBN 978-1907222016.
- Charlie Chaplin and Michael Caine, who were born and grew up locally.
- Charlie Mullins OBE, the founder of Pimlico Plumbers, was born 28 October 1952 and grew up on the Rockingham Estate.
- Footballer Tommy Langley was born in Elephant on 8 February 1958.
- In December 1962, John Major started work at the London Electricity Board.
- Actress and television presenter Lisa Maxwell was born in the area on 24 November 1963, where she was raised by her single mother and her grandparents.
- Trade Unionist Steve Turner grew up on the now demolished Heygate Estate.
- Irish writer and novelist Darren O'Shaughnessy, who was born in 1972, spent the first six years of life in Elephant, going to the English Martyrs' RC Primary School from the age of three.
- Actress Nicola Stapleton was born in Elephant on 9 August 1974, grew up near East Street and attended Townsend Primary School.
- In 1975, in his mid-twenties, gay American artist and writer Philip Core settled permanently in London, living in a flat in Elephant and Castle that was painted completely black.
- Rapper Jahaziel was born on 26 July 1976 and was raised in the area.
- In 1979, David Bruce started his first Firkin Brewery brewpub in Elephant and Castle.
- During the 1980s, Mark Ashton lived in a council flat in Claydon House on the Heygate Estate, which is where he formed with his friend Mike Jackson the group Lesbians and Gays Support the Miners in 1984.
- Horse racing announcer Mark Johnson attended the then London College of Printing, receiving a bachelor's degree in television, film, and theatre studies, and a postgraduate diploma in radio journalism.
- Joy Crookes was born in the Lambeth district of South London on 9 October 1998 and grew up in the area of Elephant and Castle, where she spent eight years at a Catholic state primary school.
- In October 2004, Richard Reynolds, a then resident of Perronet House, launched GuerrillaGardening.org as a record of his solo attempts at guerrilla gardening. The site launched the trend in the UK and world.
- Gay rights activist Peter Tatchell lives on the Rockingham Estate, where the Council installed a blue plaque in his name in 2010.
- In 2012, Anglican priest, journalist and broadcaster, Giles Fraser became the priest-in-charge at St Mary's, Newington.
- Arsenal footballer Reiss Nelson was born in Elephant and Castle.
- Circuit Judge Sir (Anthony) Mark David Havelock-Allan, 5th Baronet, QC, FCIArb, lives in the area with his second wife Alison née Foster, whom he married 1986.
- Academic, author, and broadcaster Kieran Maguire was born in the Elephant and Castle to Irish parents.

Dante Gabriel Rossetti and Fanny Cornforth, who apparently took her nickname "elephant" from the place, as well as Elizabeth Siddal, Samuel Palmer, George Tinworth, Robert Browning, Sarah Wardroper and Octavia Hill are also thought to have lived in the area.

== In popular culture ==
- A "Fancy Toy Dog Show" is held at Elephant and Castle in 1834.
- Don John of Seville, a blank verse work by Edgardo Colona was first performed at the Elephant and Castle Theatre in 1876.
- On 26 October 1932, the BBC's Home Service broadcast a performance by Quentin Maclean from the organ of the Trocadero cinema. Maclean had been Chief Organist there since 1930.
- The 1983–1985 ITV sitcom Up the Elephant and Round the Castle starring Jim Davidson was set in Elephant and Castle, with the title being a reference to the area.
- Hannibal House was the location for the Macpherson Inquiry into the murder of Stephen Lawrence, ordered in 1997.
- On Christmas 2002, performance artist Mark McGowan rolled along the pavement from the Elephant and Castle to Gallery 1,000,000 mph in Bethnal Green Road, a distance of four and a half miles, wearing yellow rubber marigold cleaning gloves and singing We Wish You A Merry Christmas. He did this in an attempt to "get people to be kind and polite to cleaners for Christmas", inspired by a time he had worked as a cleaner and had not received a kind comment or a thank you.
- Scenes for the 2002 BBC sitcom 15 Storeys High were filmed in the shopping centre, featuring notably the bowling alley and the Sundial restaurant.
- Some of contemporary artist and ornithologist Marcus Coates' work has focused on housing in Elephant and Castle, including a film (Vision Quest – a Ritual for Elephant & Castle) and an on-stage trance in 2009.
- In 2011/2012 social documentary photographer and university lecturer Paul Reas completed From a Distance, a year-long commission on the regeneration of the Elephant and Castle in part of The Elephant Vanishes project, directed by Patrick Sutherland, for London College of Communication. He photographed people candidly, showing fraught and tense emotions (with the aid of an assistant with a boom mounted flashgun); portraits; cans of incense intended to provide help under specific social pressures; and discarded furniture. The photographs were exhibited in 2012 and published by Photography and the Archive Research Centre (PARC) in Fieldstudy 16: From a Distance.
- Despite some general opposition from residents to the estate being used as a dystopian backdrop on film, scenes for the 2011 British science fiction comedy horror film Attack the Block, and for 2013 American action horror film World War Z were shot on the Heygate Estate.
- The rock band The Maccabees, who has its studio nearby, released its 4th album, Marks to Prove It, on 31 July 2015, which pays tribute to the area.
- Part of the action of the 2012 post-apocalypse novel Ice Diaries by Lexi Revellian, published by Hoxton Press, is set in Strata SE1. ISBN 0956642276
- The images on both sides of Aphex Twin's 2005 record Analord 11 feature the Michael Faraday Memorial. In 2018, The artist also used stealth marketing to trail the release of his latest album by posting a logo associated with him in the corridors of the Tube Station.

== See also ==
- Elephant and Castle Pub and Restaurant, a restaurant chain in North America named after this area in London
