= Street names of Clerkenwell and Finsbury =

This is a list of the etymology of street names and principal buildings in the London districts of Clerkenwell and Finsbury, in the London Borough of Islington. The Clerkenwell/Finsbury area has no formally defined boundaries - those used here are: Pentonville Road to the north, Goswell Road to the east, Clerkenwell Road to the south and Gray's Inn Road to the west. Finsbury was traditionally roughly the northern part of the area covered here, however in practice the name is rarely used these days.

Several names are derived from the titles and properties of the Compton family, local landowners since the 17th century, earls and later marquesses of Northampton.

== A-F ==
- Acton Street – after Acton Meadow which formerly occupied this site
- Agdon Street – Lord Northampton owned a property called Agdon in Warwickshire
- Albemarle Way – after Elizabeth, Dowager Duchess of Albemarle, who lived at Newcastle House nearby in the 18th century
- Ampton Place and Ampton Street – after its builder the 3rd Lord Calthorpe, who owned land at Ampton, Suffolk
- Amwell Street – after the nearby New River, which starts at Great Amwell, Hertfordshire
- Archery Fields House, Wharton Street - after the historic use of the land
- Arlington Way – after Lord Arlington whose estates were inherited by the Dukes of Grafton; before 1936 called Arlington Street
- Ashby Street – Lord Northampton had a seat at Castle Ashby, Northamptonshire
- Attneave Street – thought to be named after A Attneave, local builder in the 1890s
- Aylesbury Street – after the Earl of Aylesbury, who owned Clerkenwell Priory in the 17th century
- Back Hill – as it lies off (or to the 'back') of a main road
- Baker’s Row and Baker’s Yard – after Richard Baker, a local 18th century carpenter
- Bath Yard - after the Marquess of Bath, who owned land locally
- Berry Place and Berry Street – after Thomas Berry, local early 19th century landowner
- Bevin House and Bevin Way – after prominent Labour politician Ernest Bevin
- Bowling Green Lane – after the former Bowling Green House on this site, demolished 1933. The house had been built over an old bowling green which dated back to the 18th century
- Brewhouse Yard – after a former brewery on this site
- Britannia Street – built in the 1760s and named to suggest patriotism
- Cable House, Great Percy Street - after the Cable family, agents to the Lloyd Baker estate
- Calthorpe Street – after Henry Gough-Calthorpe, 1st Baron Calthorpe, local 18th century landowner, and his descendants who developed the local street plan
- Catherine Griffiths Court – after Catherine Griffiths (1885–1988), a suffragette, founder of the Finsbury Women's Committee in the 1920s, and Mayor of Finsbury in 1960
- Chadwell Street – after Chadwell Spring in Great Amwell, Hertfordshire, source of the nearby New River, or possibly William Chadwell Mylne
- Charles Rowan House, Margery Street - originally built as police housing, named after Commissioner Sir Charles Rowan
- Claremont Close and Claremont Square – after the nearby Claremont Chapel on Pentonville Road (now the Crafts Council), which was named after Claremont, Surrey, the country house of the then-recently deceased Princess Charlotte of Wales
- Clerkenwell Close, Clerkenwell Green and Clerkenwell Road – from a local well (‘the Clerk’s well), which gave its name to the area
- Coldbath Square – after a former cold spring on this site that was used for medicinal purposes in the 17th – 18th centuries
- Coley Street - after Henry Coley, 17th century mathematician, who lived on Gray's Inn Road
- Compton Passage and Compton Street – after the Marquesses of Northampton, who owned land locally
- Corporation Row – after the former New Corporation Work House, built here in the 1660s; prior to this it was known as Cut Throat Lane
- Crawford Passage – after Peter Crawford, landlord of a former pub here called the Pickled Egg; the passage was formerly Pickled Egg Walk
- Cruickshank Street – after George Cruikshank, 19th century illustrator who lived on nearby Amwell Street
- Cubitt Street – after the prominent 19th century builder Thomas Cubitt, who built this street; it was formerly called Arthur Street
- Cumberland Gardens – probably in honour of the Duke of Cumberland; prior to 1929 this was Cumberland Terrace
- Cyrus Street – possibly after the Persian King of this name; prior to 1880 it was called King Street
- Dabbs Lane - names after Thomas Dabbs
- Dallington Street – after Robert Dallington, master of the Charterhouse in the 1620s
- Earlom House, Fernsbury Street - named after the artist Richard Earlom
- Earlstoke Street – corruption of Erlestoke: local landowner Charles Compton, 1st Marquess of Northampton, married in 1787 Maria Smith, daughter of Joshua Smith MP, of Erlestoke Park, Wiltshire
- Easton Street – Lord Northampton owned property in Easton Maudit, Northamptonshire
- Edward Rudolf House - named after Edward Rudolf, founder of the Children's Society, whose head office was formerly here
- Elm Street – possibly for the former elm trees located here
- Exmouth Market – after Edward Pellew, 1st Viscount Exmouth, prominent 18th century Royal Navy Admiral
- Eyre Street Hill – after Henry Samuel Eyre, Master Gunmaker; formerly called Little Bath Street
- Farringdon Lane and Farringdon Road – from Sir William de Faringdon, 13th-century Alderman and Sheriff of London
- Fernsbury Street – named in 1912 after an early variant of ‘Finsbury’, former name for this area
- Field Street – built over Battle Bridge Field, or possibly after Peter Field, early 19th century builder
- Fleet Square – presumably as the river Fleet flowed near here
- Frederick Street – after local landowners the Barons Calthorpe, the 4th and 5th of whom were called Frederick
- Friend Street – after George Friend, local scarlet-dyer who founded a free clinic nearby in 1780

== G-L ==
- Garnault Mews and Garnault Street – after Samuel Garnault, 18th century treasurer of the New River Company
- Gloucester Way – after Thomas Lloyd Baker, local landowner, who also owned Hardwicke Court in Gloucester
- Goswell Place and Goswell Road – there is dispute over the origins of the name, with some sources claiming the road was named after a nearby garden called 'Goswelle' or 'Goderell' which belonged to Robert de Ufford, 1st Earl of Suffolk, whilst others state it derives from "God's Well", and the traditional pagan practice of well-worship. or else a former 'Gode Well' located here
- Gough Street – after Sir Richard Gough, wool merchant and local landowner in the early 18th century
- Granville Square and Granville Street – after Granville Sharp, notable opponent of the slave trade; he was the uncle of Mary Sharp, who married local landowner Thomas Lloyd Baker
- Gray's Inn Road – named after Lord Grey de Wilton's medieval townhouse which later became an inn of court leased to lawyers in the 16th century
- Great Sutton Street and Sutton Lane – after Thomas Sutton, who founded the nearby Charterhouse School in 1611
- Green Terrace and Green Yard – possibly after the adjacent Spa Green, or instead John Greene, Clerk to the New River Company in the late 1600s
- Greenaway House, Fernsbury Street - after the illustrator Kate Greenaway who studied at Finsbury School of Art
- Gwynne Place and Gwynne House, Margery Street – after Nell Gwynne, mistress of Charles II, who lived near here
- Hardwick Mews and Hardwick Street – after Thomas Lloyd Baker, local landowner, who also owned Hardwicke Court in Gloucestershire
- Hayward’s Place – after James Hayward, local 19th century landowner and ironmonger
- Herbal Hill and Herbal Place – after a former herb garden near here belonging to the Bishops of Ely, former local landowners
- Hermit Street – after a hermitage established here in 1511 by the Knights of Saint John of Jerusalem
- Holford Mews, Holdford Place and Holford Street – after the Holford family, who worked on the New River) scheme in the 18th century
- Holsworthy Square – after the Prideaux family seat in Devon
- Ingle Mews and Inglebert Street – after William Inglebert, 17th century engineer who worked on the New River scheme
- Jerusalem Passage – after the Knights of Saint John of Jerusalem
- Joseph Trotter House - after a former Mayor of Finsbury
- King’s Cross Bridge and King's Cross Road – after a former statue of George IV that formerly stood near where the train station is now; the Road was formerly called Bagnigge Wells, after a tea garden of that name near here
- Langton Close – after the Arthur Langton Nurses Home formerly located here
- Laystall Street – after a former nearby laystall, a term for a refuse heap
- Leeke Street - after Admiral Sir Henry Leeke
- Leo Yard – from the Latin for lion, as it was formerly Red Lion Yard
- Lloyd’s Row, Lloyd Square, Lloyd Street and Lloyd Baker Street – after the Lloyd Baker family, local 19th century landowners
- Lorenzo Street – after (Oliver) Lorenzo Acton; formerly York Street

== M-R ==
- Malta Street – by association with the nearby Knights of Saint John of Jerusalem (previously Knights of Malta); formerly Queen Street
- Manningford Close - after the Marquesses of Ailesbury, local landowners
- Margery Street (formerly Margaret Street), for a member of the Compton family
- Meredith Street – after John Meredith, local landowner and liveryman of the Skinners' Company, which owns much of the surrounding land
- Merlin Street – after a former local pub, the New Merlin’s Cave after a local landowner of this name
- Michael Cliffe House, Skinner Street - after a former Mayor of Finsbury
- Mount Pleasant – ironically named after a former nearby refuse tip
- Myddelton Passage, Myddelton Square and Myddelton Street – after Sir Hugh Myddleton, who devised the New River scheme in the early 17th century
- Mylne Street – after Robert Mylne, who did much engineering work for the New River Company, as did his son William Chadwell Mylne
- Naoroji Street – after Dadabhai Naoroji, who was active in local politics in the late 19th century
- Newcastle Row – after Newcastle House, which formerly stood here; the townhouse was named after its 17th-century owner William Cavendish, Duke of Newcastle
- Northampton Road, Northampton Row and Northampton Square – after Lord Northampton
- Northburgh Street – after Michael de Northburgh, a bishop who founded the nearby Charterhouse monastery in 1371
- Owen Street and Owen’s Row – after Dame Alice Owen, who founded almshouses near here in 1609
- Paget Street – after Sir James Paget, 19th-century surgeon, who had a clinic on nearby Friend Street
- Pakenham Street – after its builder the 3rd Lord Calthorpe, who owned land at Pakenham, Suffolk
- Pardon Street – after the Pardon Chapel which stood near here in the Middle Ages
- Pear Tree Court – thought to be from a local pear tree
- Penton Rise and Pentonville Road – after Henry Penton, who developed this area in the late 18th century
- Percival Street – after Spencer Perceval, a cousin of one of the Compton family
- Percy Circus, Percy Yard and Great Percy Street – after Robert Percy Smith, 19th-century MP who was a director of the New River Company
- Peter Benenson House, Easton Street - named after Peter Benenson, the founder of Amnesty International who have their International Secretariat there: formerly the Coates printing ink factory
- Phoenix Place and Phoenix Yard – after the former Phoenix Iron Foundry near here
- Pine Street – Wood Street prior to 1877, probably both names after an avenue of tree that formerly stood here, or possibly after Thomas Wood, 18th century leaseholder
- Poole’s Buildings - after the Revd Matthew Poole, non-conformist theologian
- Prideaux Place – after Arthur Robert Prideaux, 19th-century director of the New River Company
- Rawstorne Place and Rawstorne Street – after local 18th century bricklayer Thomas Rawstorne
- Ray Street and Ray Street Bridge – corruption of ‘Rag’, after the former local rag trade here; the streets was formerly two different streets – Hockley in the Hole and Town’s End Lane
- Riceyman House, Fernsbury Street - named after the novel Riceyman Steps set nearby
- River Passage, River Street and River Street Mews – after the nearby New River
- Robert's Place – probably after Richard Roberts, who built much of the local area in the 1800s
- Rosebery Avenue and Rosebery Square – after the Prime Minister Archibald Primrose, 5th Earl of Rosebery, chairman of London County Council when these streets were built in 1889
- Rosoman Place – after Thomas Rosoman, first manager of the nearby Sadler’s Wells Theatre in the 18th century

== S-Z ==
- Sage Way
- St Chad’s Place – after the nearby St Chad’s well, reputed to be a medieval holy well; St Chad was a 7th-century bishop
- St Helena Street – believed to be named after St Helena, in commemoration of Napoleon’s exile there in 1815
- St James’s Walk – after the adjacent St James's Church, Clerkenwell
- St John Street and St John’s Square – after the Knights of Saint John of Jerusalem, who established headquarters here in the 12th century
- St Philip's House, Margery Street - named after St Philip's Church, Granville Square
- Sanders House, Great Percy Street - named after C S Sanders, surveyor of the New River Company
- Sans Walk – after Edward Sans, named in 1893 as he was then oldest member of the local parish vestry
- Scotswood Street
- Sebastian Street – after Lewis Sebastian, former Master of the Worshipful Company of Skinners and Chairman of the Governors of Northampton Polytechnic (now City University)
- Seddon Street – after the Seddon brothers, local merchants and landowners
- Sekforde Street – after Thomas Seckford, Elizabethan courtier, who bequeathed land nearby for the building of an almshouse
- Sherston Court – owned by the Compton family
- Skinner Street – after the Skinners' Company, which owned much of the surrounding land when the street was built in the 1810s
- Soley Mews – owned by the Compton family
- Spafield Street and the Spa Fields estate – after a former spa on this site which closed in 1776
- Spencer Street – after Spencer Perceval, a cousin of one of the Compton family
- Summers Street – named after the Earl Somers
- Swinton Place and Swinton Street – after local 18th-century landowner James Swinton
- Tompion Street – after 17th century clockmaker Thomas Tompion; formerly called Smith Street
- Topham Street – after local strongman Thomas Topham, who performed feats of strength here in the 18th century
- Tysoe Street – Lord Northampton owned land at Tysoe in Warwickshire
- Vernon Rise and Vernon Square – after Robert Vernon, 1st Baron Lyveden, 19th-century director of the New River Company
- Vine Hill and Vine Street Bridge – after the vineyards owned by the Bishops of Ely formerly located here
- Vineyard Walk – after a former 18th-century vineyard on this site
- Warner Street and Warner Yard – after Robert Warner, local 18th century landowner
- Wells Square - after the former Wells Street which led to Bagnigge Wells spa
- Weston Rise – after John Weston, who built this road in the 1790s
- Wharton Street – after Philip Wharton, 4th Baron Wharton, who owned a townhouse at Clerkenwell Close in the mid 17th century
- Whiskin Way – after John Whiskin, local landowner/builder in the 19th century
- White Bear Yard - possibly after a former inn
- Wicklow Street – named after the Earl of Wicklow
- William Martin Court - named after Alderman William Martin, Mayor of Finsbury
- Wilmington Square and Wilmington Street – Lord Northampton also holds the subsidiary title Baron Wilmington
- Woodbridge Street – after Thomas Seckford, Elizabethan courtier who bequeathed land nearby for building an almshouse; Seckford was born at Woodbridge, Suffolk
- Wren Street – after prominent architect Sir Christopher Wren
- Wyclif Street – after John Wycliffe, noted 14th-century religious reformer; by association with the former nearby Smithfield Martyrs’ Memorial Church
- Wynyatt Street – corruption of ‘Wynyates’; Lord Northampton owns land at Compton Wynyates in Northamptonshire
- Yardley Street – One of the Compton family was born at Yardley Hastings, Northamptonshire
