= Amwell Cottage =

House in London, England

General information
- Type: Residential
- Architectural style: Cottage
- Location: London, England
- Coordinates: 51°31′48″N 0°06′40″W
- Completed: 1822

Design and construction
- Architect: Possibly William Chadwell Mylne

Listed Building – Grade II
- Official name: 69, GREAT PERCY STREET
- Designated: 29 September 1972
- Reference no.: 1195603

Amwell Cottage or 69 Great Percy Street is a Grade II listed Georgian cottage that sits on Great Percy Street in London.

== History ==
The cottage was built as part of the New River Estate, then an area of open fields owned by the New River Company which surrounded their New River Head and reservoir. The area's development was largely undertaken by William Chadwell Mylne, who is likely the architect of the cottage. The cottage was built between 1821 and 1822, and is named after Amwell in Hertfordshire the site of one of the New River's springs. The house became a dairy in 1843 and remained so until the 1960s.

== Design ==
The house's design as a two-storey stucco cottage is out of keeping with much of the rest of the estate, was developed as Georgian style terraces. While it was constructed before much else in the area, the rest of the development already had plans and was to be built over the coming decades.
