= Percy Arms =

Former public house in London, England

Coordinates: 51.529371°N 0.1129768°W

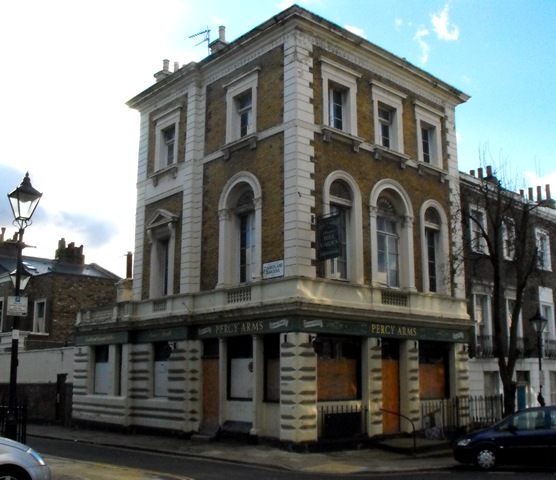
The former Percy Arms

The Percy Arms was a public house that stood on Great Percy Street in Clerkenwell, central London. The pub was closed by 2005 with the building since converted to residences, but remains Grade II listed.

== History ==
The pub was built as part of the New River Estate, then an area of open fields owned by the New River Company which surrounded their New River Head reservoir. In 1839 R. C. Carpenter wrote to the New River Company for the brewers E. and W. Calvert to propose a public house be built in the new estate, which was approved, and built a year later. The pub is named for Robert Percy who, along with many of his family, had worked for the New River Company.

== Architecture and fittings ==
Designed by Carpenter, the architecture is largely unique to the broader development of the New River Estate, consisting of regular Georgian style terraces. The building likely taking inspiration in its Italianate design from E. M. Barry's Traveller's Club clubhouse on Pall Mall, drawings of which were published in 1839. It is built of stock brick with heavy use of stucco detailing and banding.
