= List of works by R. C. Carpenter =

R. C. Carpenter (1812–1855) was an English architect whose output consisted mainly of churches in Gothic Revival style. He was born in Clerkenwell, London, and was educated at Charterhouse School. His first commissions, obtained through his father, were for domestic properties, including Lonsdale Square in London, and for designs for railway companies. However, his main interest was in designing churches.

Carpenter joined the Cambridge Camden Society in 1841 and was, with A. W. N. Pugin, a keen advocate of designing churches with features taken accurately from actual Gothic predecessors. His town churches include St Mary Magdalene, Munster Square, London, which is described as his "most illustrious" church, and St Paul, Brighton.

Carpenter also designed smaller country churches which shared a similar plan, and this plan was also used for two churches in Australia. Carpenter restored churches and cathedrals, the latter including Chichester and St Patrick, Dublin. He also carried out work on country houses, and designed buildings for schools, including Sherborne School, Hurstpierpoint College, and Lancing College. He died from tuberculosis at the age of 42, and was buried in Highgate Cemetery.

== Key ==
Grade (England)	Criteria
Grade I	Buildings of exceptional interest, sometimes considered to be internationally important.
Grade II*	Particularly important buildings of more than special interest.
Grade II	Buildings of national importance and special interest.
Category (Scotland)	Criteria
Category B	Buildings of special architectural or historic interest which are major examples of a particular period, style or building type.
Category C	Buildings of special architectural or historic interest which are representative examples of a period, style or building type.
"—" denotes a work that is not graded.

== Works ==
Name	Location	Photograph	Date	Notes	Grade
Lonsdale Square	Barnsbury, Islington, Greater London; 51.5396°N 0.1082°W		c. 1838–45	A square of Gothic Revival terraced houses.	II*
Christ Church	Albany Street, Camden, Greater London; 51.5303°N 0.1443°W		1839–43	Alterations to a church built in 1836. It served as the cathedral of the Greek Orthodox Church of Antioch from 1989 to 2023.	II*
Percy Arms	Great Percy Street, Islington, Greater London; 51.5294°N 0.1130°W		c. 1840	A public house in Italianate style.	II
Chichester Cathedral	Chichester, West Sussex; 50.8363°N 0.7808°W		1840–	Restoration, continued by J. Butler.	I
St Stephen's Church	Birmingham, West Midlands	—	1841–44	A new church, since demolished.	—
St James' Church	Nutley, East Sussex; 51.0323°N 0.0549°E		1842–44	A new small country church.	—
St Mary's Church	Stowting, Kent; 51.1364°N 1.0358°E		1843–44	Restoration of the chancel of a church dating from the 13th century.	II*
St Andrew's Church	Birmingham, West Midlands	—	1844–46	A new church, since demolished.	—
St Giles' Church	Bodiam, East Sussex; 51.0075°N 0.5393°E		1845–46	Restoration of a church dating from the 14th century.	II*
Camden House	Chipping Campden, Gloucestershire; 52.0379°N 1.8072°W	—	1846	Remodelling for Lord Gainsborough of a house originally built in 1628.	II*
St Thomas à Becket's Church	Pucklechurch, Gloucestershire; 51.4869°N 2.4345°W		1846	Restoration of a church dating from the 13th century.	I
St Paul's Church	Brighton, East Sussex; 50.8221°N 0.1446°W		1846–48	A new church. The steeple was added in 1873–75 by his son, R. H. Carpenter.	II*
St John the Baptist's Church	Buckland, Tasmania, Australia	—	1846–48	A new church.	—
St Nicholas' Church	Kemerton, Worcestershire; 52.0297°N 2.0803°W		1846–50	Rebuilding of the church, other than the west tower, for Revd Thomas Thorp, Archdeacon of Bristol.	II*
All Saints Church	Brighton, East Sussex	—	1847–52	A new church, since demolished.	—
St Andrew's Church	Monkton Wyld, Wootton Fitzpaine, Dorset; 50.7570°N 2.8925°W		1848	A new church in Gothic Revival style.	II*
Rectory	Monkton Wyld, Wootton Fitzpaine, Dorset; 50.7629°N 2.9406°W	—	1848	Built as the rectory for St Andrew's Church. Later used as a house and known as Monkton Wyld Court.	II
Holy Innocents' Church	Rossmore, New South Wales, Australia	—	1848–50	A new church.	—
St Peter the Great's Church	Chichester, West Sussex; 50.8370°N 0.7817°W		1848–52	A new church, damaged in the Second World War. It has since been declared redundant and converted into a public house.	II
St Laurence's Church	Catsfield, East Sussex; 50.8939°N 0.4565°E		1849	Restoration of the church, which dates from the 12th century, and rebuilding of its north aisle.	II*
St John the Baptist's Church	Cookham Dean, Berkshire; 51.5582°N 0.7445°W		1849	A new small country church.	II
St Laurence's Church	Hawkhurst, Kent; 51.0376°N 0.5032°E		1849	Restoration and extension of a church dating from the 14th century.	I
Captain Cook School and School House	Middlesbrough, North Yorkshire; 54.5351°N 1.2043°W	—	1849–50	Built as a primary school. Later converted into a private house and nursery.	II
St Mary Magdalene's Church	Munster Square, Camden, Greater London; 51.5260°N 0.1425°W		1849–52	A new church in Gothic Revival style.	II*
Kilndown House	Kilndown, Kent; 51.0945°N 0.4286°E	—	1849–55	Built as the vicarage for Kilndown Church. The associated stable courtyard was also designed by Carpenter, and is listed separately at Grade II.	II
Sherborne Abbey	Sherborne, Dorset; 50.9467°N 2.5167°W		1849–58	Restoration of the transepts, the choir, and a porch.	I
St Peter and St Paul's Church	Algarkirk, Lincolnshire; 52.8995°N 0.0817°W		1850–54	Restoration of a church dating from the late 12th century.	I
St Stephen's Episcopal Church and Parsonage	Burntisland, Fife, Scotland	—	1850–54	Commenced by Carpenter, the parsonage was completed by William Slater. The church was never completed, and was demolished in 1875.	B
Episcopal School	Burntisland, Fife, Scotland	—	1850–54	Built as a church school, later used as the hall for a pipe band.	C
Church of St James the Less	Stubbings, Berkshire; 51.5275°N 0.7759°W		1850–54	A new small country church.	II
St Mary's Church	Old Town, Eastbourne, East Sussex; 50.7727°N 0.2658°E		1851	Restoration of a church dating from the late 12th century.	I
St John the Evangelist's Church	Bovey Tracey, Devon; 50.5876°N 3.6780°W		1851–53	A new small country church.	II*
Almshouses and chapel	Belmont Rural, Herefordshire; 52.0416°N 2.7509°W	—	1852	A row of almshouses with a chapel at the south end, built for F. C. Wegg-Prosser.	II
St Nicholas' Church	Brighton, East Sussex; 50.8254°N 0.1449°W		1853	A church dating from the 14th century, largely rebuilt.	II*
Hurstpierpoint College	Hurstpierpoint, West Sussex; 50.9431°N 0.1649°W		1853	Completed after his death by his son, R. H. Carpenter, and Benjamin Ingelow.	II
East and West Quadrangles, Lancing College	Lancing, West Sussex; 50.8462°N 0.3041°W	—	1853–55	The earliest buildings of the college, completed by William Slater.	II*
Bedgebury Park	Bedgebury Cross, Kent; 51.0830°N 0.4560°E	—	1854–55	Alterations to a country house dating from 1688. The house was later used as a school.	II*
St Mary's Church	Sompting, West Sussex; 50.8387°N 0.3519°W		1854–55	Restoration of a church dating from the 11th–12th century.	I
Christ Church	Milton-next-Gravesend, Kent	—	1854–56	A new church, completed by William Slater after Carpenter's death, later extended; it was demolished in 1935 and rebuilt on a nearby site.	—
Boys' School House, Sherborne School	Sherborne, Dorset; 50.9473°N 2.5166°W	—	1860	Designed by Carpenter, but not built until after his death.	II
St Patrick's Cathedral	Dublin, Republic of Ireland		Undated	Restoration.	—
School House Studies, Sherborne School	Sherborne, Dorset; 50.9471°N 2.5171°W	—	Undated	Restoration of the 15th-century wing of the former abbey, which included the abbey kitchen.	I
