= New River Path =

Footpath in Hertfordshire and London, England

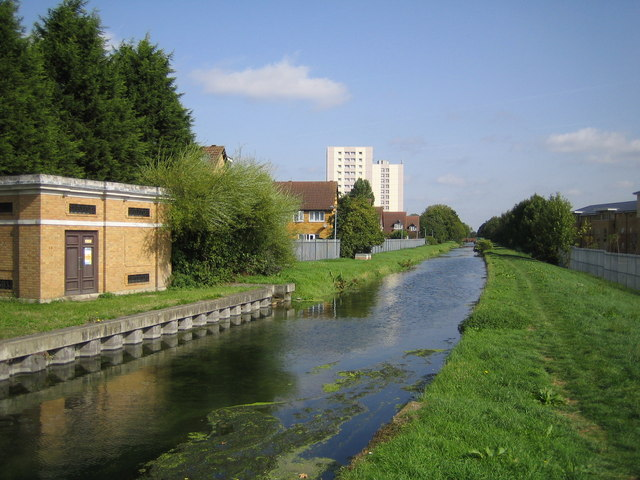
- The path at Enfield
- Length: 28 mi (45 km)
- Location: Hertfordshire, England; North London
- Trailheads: New Gauge, Hertford; 51.806879°N 0.057881°W; M25 crossing 51.682865°N 0.054702°W; The Castle, Finsbury Park; 51.565628°N 0.093365°W; New River Head, Islington, London; 51.528396°N 0.107278°W
- Use: Hiking
- Season: All year

The New River Path is a long-distance footpath which follows the course of the 17th-century aqueduct, the New River, for 28 miles (45 km) from its source in Hertfordshire to its original end in Islington, London. The path is waymarked and all signs display the words "New River Path" on a green background.

== History ==
The New River itself was completed in 1613. The aqueduct supplies water from Hertfordshire to North London.

The New River Path was developed over a 12-year period at a cost of over £2 million; of this sum £1.3 million has been invested by Thames Water in the project. Throughout this time Thames Water has worked to overcome operational, safety and security issues in partnership with, and with the support of, many organisations; including Groundwork, London's Waterway Partnership, the Countryside Agency, the New River Action Group, Friends of the New River Walk, local schools, and all the local authorities along the route.

In 2021 the New River Path was blocked close to its northern end, when its crossing over the Hertford East branch line at Kings Mead was closed by Network Rail on safety grounds.

== Route ==
The grassed riverside path is restricted to use by walkers, with a few sections with hard surfaces being accessible to wheelchair users. At all path access points, safety notices are displayed which specify precautions. Users of the route are requested (by Thames Water) to keep to the path, not to interfere with wildlife, keep dogs on leads and avoid fouling, take litter home and take care crossing roads. At times, operational work needs to be carried out which may cause sections of the path to be closed temporarily.

The walk can be split into the following three sections.

=== Hertfordshire; 14 miles (23 km) ===
The path begins at New Gauge, Hertford, and passes through the Lee Valley towns and villages of Ware, Great Amwell, St Margarets, Rye House, Hoddesdon, Broxbourne, Turnford, Cheshunt and Waltham Cross.

=== London; 11 miles (18 km) ===
After crossing over the M25, the path passes through four London boroughs; Enfield, Haringey, Hackney and Islington. The route of the path takes it close to the Hertford Loop Line stations of Enfield Chase, Winchmore Hill, Palmers Green, Bowes Park, Alexandra Palace, Hornsey, Harringay and Essex Road. The route is also adjacent to Harringay Green Lanes railway station, Manor House tube station, Canonbury railway station and Angel tube station.

From Clissold Park, its route along the broad verge down the centre of Petherton Road leads to Essex Road, where another redundant section of the New River's course between Canonbury and Islington town centre forms a path alongside the now shallow stream, recreated as part of a linear park known as the New River Walk. At Canonbury Road, the walk continues through a fernery to Pleasant Place, where an inscription in the pavement marks the New River's route. At Islington Green, there is a statue of Sir Hugh Myddelton; the route continues along Colebrooke Row and Duncan Terrace to the Angel, then through Owen's Field to the New River Head between Amwell Street and Rosebery Avenue. The New River's course between Balls Pond Road and Essex Road, and along Colebrooke Row up to City Road, is marked by white boulders.

=== Heritage section; 3 miles (4.8 km) ===
The path follows the now truncated route of the watercourse to its culmination at New River Head.
