= Percy Circus =

Circular street in London, England

Coordinates: 51.529225°N 0.114217°W

Designations

Listed Building – Grade II
- Official name: Numbers 1 to 3 (Consecutive) And Attached Railings
- Designated: 29 September 1972
- Reference no.: 1208278

Listed Building – Grade II
- Official name: Numbers 4-15 (Consecutive) And Attached Railings
- Designated: 29 September 1972
- Reference no.: 1195704

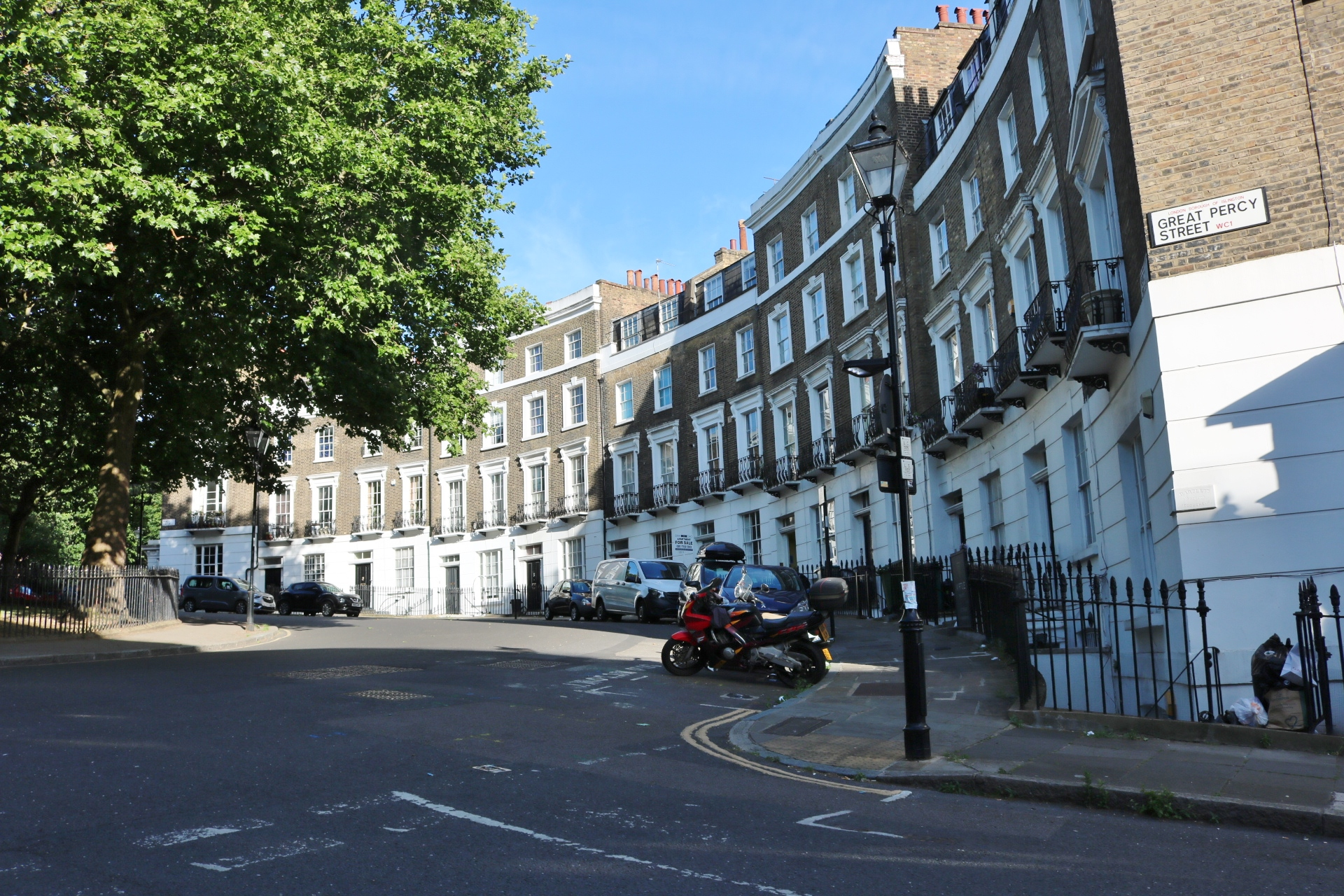
Houses in Percy Circus

Percy Circus is a ring of townhouses with a central garden in the Clerkenwell area of London. It sits on the intersection between Great Percy Street and Vernon Street.

== Background ==
The circus was constructed as part of a larger residential development on the land of the New River Estate and Lloyd Baker Estate. The plot was an area of open fields owned by the New River Company which surrounded their New River Head reservoir, with development beginning in 1819 and carrying on into the 1850s. The area's development was largely undertaken by William Chadwell Mylne, who gives his name to a number of the streets in the area.

Percy Circus, along with Great Percy Street were named for Robert Percy who, along with many of his family, had worked for the New River Company. It was laid out beginning in 1841 and completed by 1853.

== History and design ==
The houses are of a more Italianate design, but retain the stock brick facades and Georgian character of the rest of the estate. The circus layout was a rare example used in the development of a residential estate in London. Possible inspirations include The Circus in Bath, the Royal Circus of Edinburgh New Town, or the more urban designs of Finsbury and Piccadilly Circus.

Richard Cromwell Carpenter provide the first accepted designs of the houses, giving them a unique character in comparison to Mylne's designs used in much of the rest of the estate. Christopher Hussey described it in 1939 as "one of the most delightful bits of town planning in London". Following bomb damage in the second world war a number of the houses were demolished, although the circus did not suffer as bad a fate as the nearby Holford Square which became Bevin Court. Of the original 27 houses, 15 survive, with nine of the remaining rebuilt in a historicist form.

The original houses which survive at Nos. 1 to 15 were awarded Grade II listed status in 1972. Vladimir Lenin is known to have lived briefly at Percy Circus in 1905 with a blue plaque dedicated to him at No. 16.

== See also ==
- Bevin Court
- Great Percy Street
