= Henry Mill =

English inventor (died 1771)

Henry Mill (c. 1683–1771) was an English inventor who patented the first typewriter in 1714. He worked as a waterworks engineer for the New River Company, and submitted two patents during his lifetime. One was for a coach spring, while the other was for a "Machine for Transcribing Letters". The machine that he invented appears, from the patent, to have been similar to a typewriter, but nothing further is known. Other early developers of typewriting machines include Pellegrino Turri. Many of these early machines, including Turri's, were developed to enable the blind to write.

== Life ==
The eldest son of Andrew and Dorothy Mill, was born in 1683 or 1684; according to his epitaph he was a relation of Sir Hugh Myddelton. He obtained an appointment about 1720 as engineer to the New River Company.

Mill's obituary notice in the Gentleman's Magazine states that he erected waterworks at Northampton. He was employed by Sir Robert Walpole to carry out the water supply for Houghton Hall.

Mill in later life employed Robert Mylne as assistant. He died unmarried at his house in Strand, London on 26 December 1771, and he was buried in St Mary's Church, Breamore, near Salisbury, with a long epitaph to his memory. The epitaph states that he was aged 87, but he is entered in the parish register as aged 88 years.

== Inventions ==
In 1706 Mill obtained a patent (No. 376) for an improvement in carriage springs, and also in 1714 another patent (No. 395) for an apparatus "for impressing or transcribing of letters singly or progressively one after another, so neat and exact as not to be distinguished from print, very useful in settlements and public records". The patent contains no description of the apparatus, but it has been regarded as the first proposal for a typewriter.

== Notes ==
Attribution

This article incorporates text from a publication now in the public domain: Lee, Sidney, ed. (1894). "Mill, Henry". Dictionary of National Biography. Vol. 37. London: Smith, Elder & Co.
