= Great Percy Street =

Street in London, England

Coordinates: 51.529739°N 0.111971°W

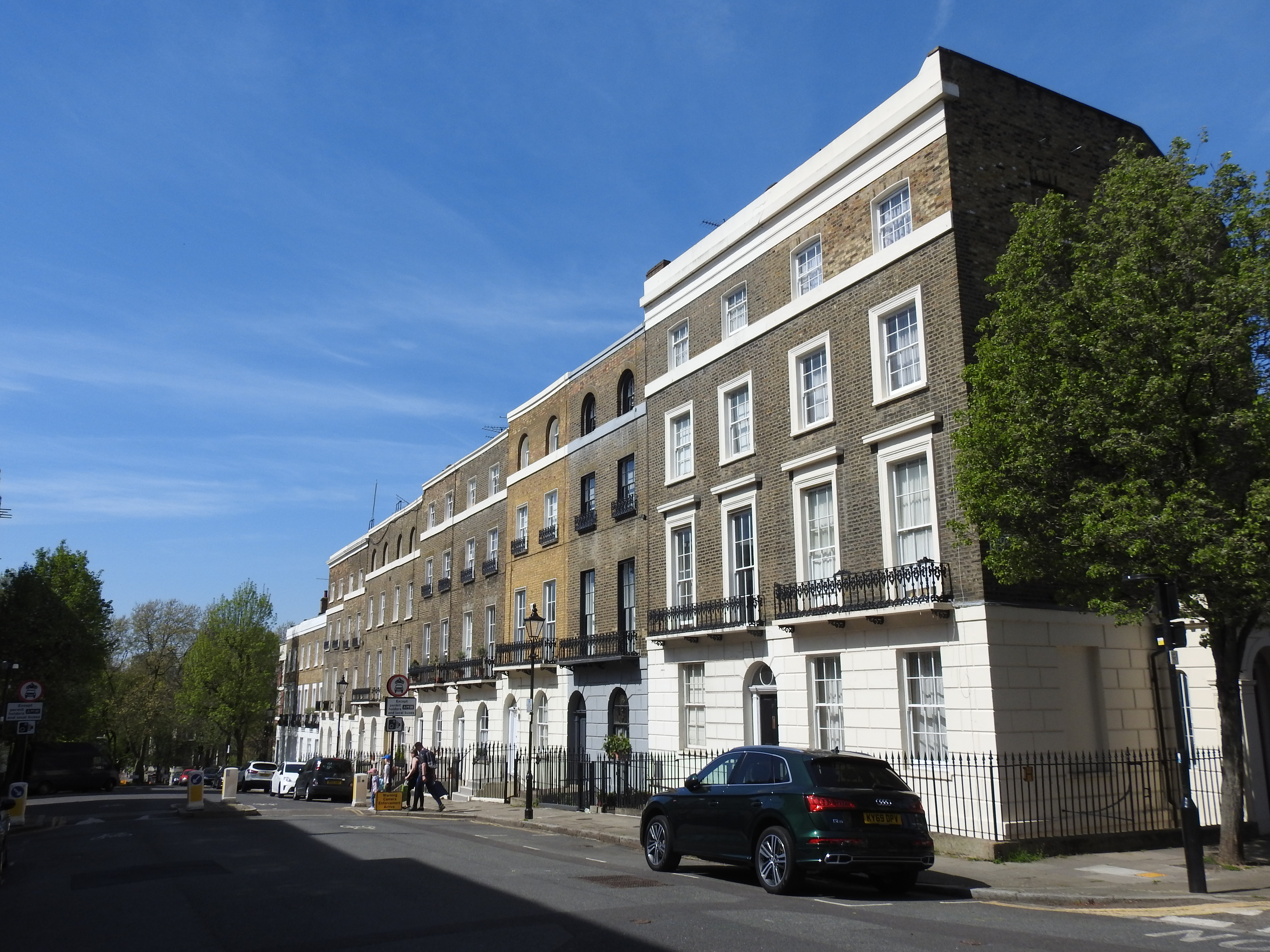
Houses on Great Percy Street

Great Percy Street is a street that runs east to west from Amwell Street through Percy Circus to King's Cross Road in the Clerkenwell area of London.

== Background ==
The street was laid out as part of a larger residential development on the land of the New River Estate and Lloyd Baker Estate. The plot was an area of open fields owned by the New River Company which surrounded their New River Head reservoir, with development beginning in 1819 and carrying on into the 1850s. The area's development was largely undertaken by William Chadwell Mylne, who gives his name to a number of the streets in the area.

Great Percy Street, along with Percy Circus were named for Robert Percy who, along with many of his family, had worked for the New River Company.

== History and design ==
The street is residential in character, and presents unified elevations of Georgian style housing along the street. Amwell Cottage, built in 1820, stands in contrast with the rest of the development which was largely built after 1839. The street, along with much of the rest of the estate, is in a Georgian style, despite being built into the reign of Queen Victoria.

=== Notable properties ===
A number of the properties are Grade II listed by English Heritage. These include:

- Nos. 12-16 (even).
- Nos. 15-19 (odd).
- Nos. 18A and 18-24 (even).
- Nos. 21-39 (odd).
- No. 26, former Percy Arms public house.
- Nos. 28-54 (even).
- No. 69, Amwell Cottage.

== See also ==
- Bevin Court
- Percy Circus
- Amwell Street
