= Robert Mylne (architect) =

Scottish architect and civil engineer (1733–1811)

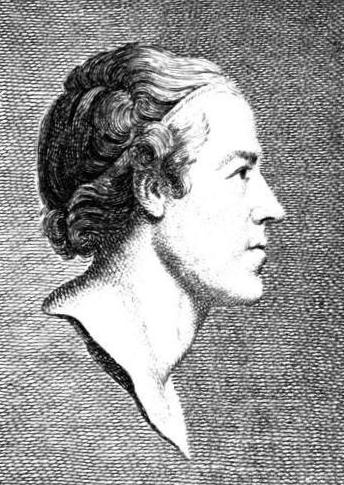
- Engraving of Mylne, aged 24, by Vincenzio Vangelisti, after a drawing by Richard Brompton.
- Born: 4 January 1733; Edinburgh, Scotland
- Died: 5 May 1811 (aged 78); New River Head, Clerkenwell, London, England
- Occupation: Architect
- Awards: Concorso Clementino, Accademia di San Luca, Rome
- Buildings: Blackfriars Bridge, London; The Wick, Richmond; Tusmore House, Oxfordshire
- Projects: Inveraray new town, Argyll

Robert Mylne (4 January 1733 – 5 May 1811) was a Scottish architect and civil engineer, particularly remembered for his design for Blackfriars Bridge in London. Born and raised in Edinburgh, he travelled to Europe as a young man, studying architecture in Rome under Piranesi. In 1758, he became the first Briton to win the triennial architecture competition at the Accademia di San Luca. This made his name known in London, and won him the rivalry of fellow Scot Robert Adam.

On his return to Britain, Mylne won the competition to design the new Blackfriars Bridge over the Thames in London, his design being chosen over those of established engineers, such as John Smeaton. He was appointed surveyor to the New River Company, which supplied drinking water to London, and Surveyor of the Fabric of St Paul's Cathedral, where he was responsible for maintaining the building designed by Sir Christopher Wren. Both positions he held for life. Mylne designed a number of country houses and city buildings, as well as bridges. As his career progressed, he concentrated more on engineering, writing reports on harbours and advising on canals, and appearing as an expert witness in lawsuits and trials.

Mylne was one of the founder members, with John Smeaton, of the Society of Civil Engineers, the first engineering society in the world, established in 1771. He was also a founder of the Architects' Club, another early professional body, and regularly socialised with the eminent doctors, philosophers and scientists of his day. Known for his quick temper and for his integrity, Mylne had a strong sense of duty, and could be stubborn when he knew he was right. This inflexibility made him unpopular with some, in an age when corruption was more widespread than today. He died aged 78 and was buried in St Paul's Cathedral: there is a memorial to him in the crypt.

== Early life ==
Mylne was descended from a family of architects and builders, and was the great-grandson of mason and architect Robert Mylne (1633–1710), remembered particularly for his work as the King's Master Builder at Holyrood Palace in Edinburgh. The younger Robert was born in Edinburgh, the son of Thomas Mylne, Edinburgh City Surveyor, and Deacon of the Incorporation of St Mary's Chapel, the main guild of masons in Edinburgh. He was educated at the Royal High School from the ages of nine to fourteen, after which he was apprenticed to Daniel Wright, a wright, or carpenter, for six years. During this time he probably also learned stonemasonry from his father. He undertook work for the Duke of Atholl at Blair Castle in Perthshire, and was expected to take over the family business from his father.

== Grand tour ==
In autumn 1754, Mylne set off for mainland Europe on the "Grand Tour", to join his brother William, who had been studying in Paris for a year. They travelled through France together, mostly on foot and by boat, visiting Avignon and Marseille, from where they sailed to Civitavecchia. Again travelling on foot, they arrived in Rome in January 1755, and took lodgings on the Via dei Condotti. They made contact with Andrew Lumisden, secretary to James Stuart, the "Old Pretender", and Abbé Peter Grant, the Scots agent in Rome. They also encountered Robert Adam, a fellow Scot also studying architecture. Adam was disdainful of the Mylnes' poor situation, but viewed Robert Mylne as a potential rival, noting that he "begins to draw extremely well". The Mylnes were continually short of funds, and had a joint allowance from their father of just £45 a year, compared to Adam's annual expenditure of around £800.

Mylne learned architectural and figure drawing, and studied the art of architectural ornament, under the direction of Giovanni Battista Piranesi. Piranesi, who had also taught Robert Adam, was a great influence on the young Mylne, and the two continued to correspond after the latter left Rome. Mylne studied the Ancient Roman system of aqueducts, and began to take on paid work as a tutor himself. A letter from the Duke of Atholl enquired when he would return to resume work at Blair, and offered Mylne the post of head carver, but he preferred to continue with his studies. In the spring of 1757, shortly after William had returned home, Mylne accompanied the diplomat Richard Phelps and antiquarian Matthew Nulty on a tour of Sicily. He produced sketches and measured drawings of the antiquities for a projected book, although this was never published.

In 1758, Mylne decided to enter the triennial architecture competition, known as the Concorso Clementino, at the Accademia di San Luca (St Luke's Academy), the subject being a design for a public gallery. He prepared two sets of drawings over seven months, apparently rejecting the first, and submitting the latter. This, the winning design, was heavily influenced by French neoclassical architecture, which helped it to stand out against the field of mostly baroque entries. On 6 September, all the entrants had to complete a prova, a drawing exercise under examination conditions, and on 18 September 1758, Mylne was awarded a silver medal, as the first Briton ever to win the competition. He was presented the award at a ceremony attended by twenty cardinals, as well as James Stuart, the Old Pretender, who was referred to in Rome as "King James III of England". The event was publicised by his family in Edinburgh and London, and he acquired the patronage of the Prince Altieri, who arranged for his election to the Academy.

Mylne left Rome in April 1759, travelling to Florence, where he was elected to the Academy of Art, then Venice, Brescia, and villas designed by Andrea Palladio. He then travelled through Germany to Rotterdam, arriving in London on 17 July 1759.

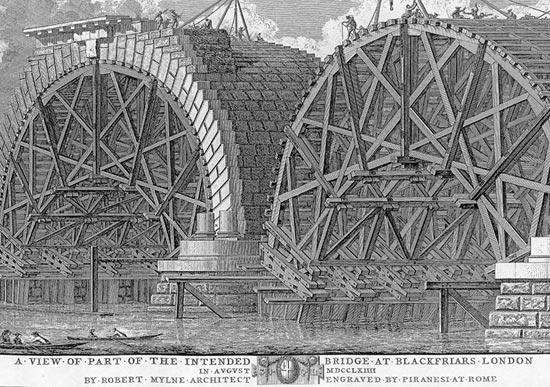
Blackfriars Bridge under construction in 1764, engraved by Piranesi

== Blackfriars Bridge ==
Mylne intended to establish himself as an architect in London, and to begin preparing his notes and sketches of Sicily for publication. However, on his arrival, he heard of the proposal to build a third bridge over the River Thames at Blackfriars. The closing date for the design competition was set for 4 October, giving Mylne less than three months to complete his scheme, although in his favour, he apparently found a friend in John Paterson, secretary of the Bridge Committee, and a fellow Scot. 69 schemes were entered into the competition, which was soon reduced to a shortlist of 14, including designs by the established engineers John Smeaton and John Gwynn, and the architects Sir William Chambers and George Dance the Elder. Mylne's design stood out, however, as it was the only one to propose flatter, elliptical arches, rather than round ones. This departure, as yet untried in Britain, provoked a public debate, and brought Mylne under attack from Dr Samuel Johnson, a friend of John Gwynn, who suggested that elliptical arches would be too weak. In response Mylne published a pamphlet, under the name "Publicus", in which the pseudonymous author praises Mylne's design, while criticising those of his competitors.

On 22 February 1760, Mylne was finally declared the winner of the competition, and he was appointed surveyor to the new Blackfriars Bridge, with overall responsibility for design, construction and future maintenance of the structure, on a salary of £400 a year. The foundation stone was laid on 31 October, and on 1 October 1764 the first arch, the 100-foot (30 m) wide centre arch, was completed. Mylne corresponded with Piranesi regarding the project, and the latter made an engraving, based on Mylne's reports, of the bridge under construction. Mylne introduced several technical innovations, including the use of removable wedges in the centring which supported the arches during construction, making it easier to dismantle. The foundations of the piers were on timber piles, levelled with an underwater saw, and the stonework was then built inside a huge caisson, a floating, submersible workspace, 86 feet (26 m) by 33 feet (10 m), and 27 feet (8.2 m) high.

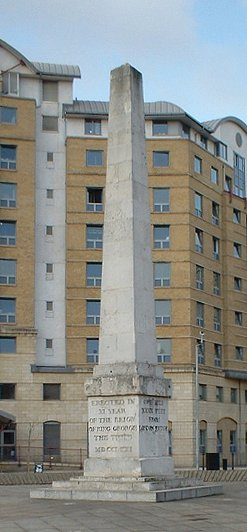
Mylne's obelisk at St George's Circus, 1771

The bridge was opened to all traffic in November 1769. As surveyor, Mylne was also responsible for laying out the approach roads; Bridge Street (now New Bridge Street) from the north, and Surrey Street (now Blackfriars Road) from the south. The squares of Chatham Square and Albion Place were laid out at the north and south ends of the bridge, respectively, and Mylne also designed the obelisk, which still stands, at St George's Circus, in 1771. Although Mylne was briefly the target of satirical anti-Scots cartoons and pamphlets at the time of winning the competition, the completed bridge was universally well-received, and tolls repaid the £152,840 cost of building within a few years. Mylne received his final payment for the works, of £4,209, in 1776, and held the post of surveyor until his death, but the bridge had to be replaced in 1869, after the rebuilding of London Bridge in 1831 affected the flow of the river.

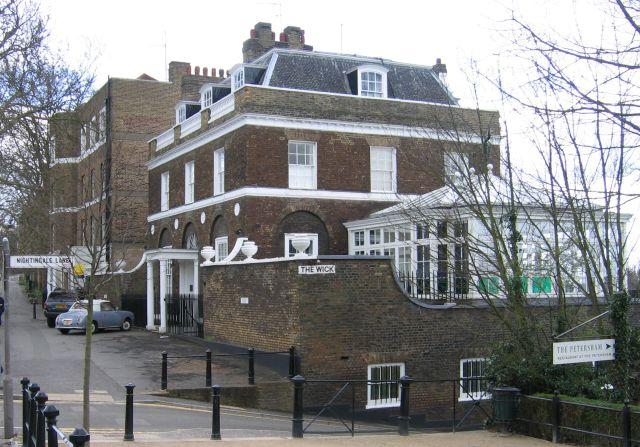
The Wick, Richmond, 1775

== Architecture ==
Despite these early successes, Mylne never won the acclaim of his contemporaries Robert Adam (1728–1792) and William Chambers (1723–1796). Although he became a successful architect, he played only a minor role in the development of neoclassical architecture, which was led by Adam and Chambers. Mylne followed the French style of neoclassicism, rather than the "Adam style", and his work was also influenced by the post-Palladian buildings of English architect Isaac Ware (1704–1766). Mylne's influence on British architecture was limited, although the Irish architect Thomas Cooley (1740–1784) was Mylne's clerk at Blackfriars, and later produced designs which show the influence of Mylne's competition-winning Rome design.

Mylne designed a number of town houses and country houses, and a few public buildings. The first new country house was Cally, in Galloway, south-west Scotland, for James Murray of Broughton. Mylne had met Murray in Rome, and drew a set of plans while still there, although the house was built to a modified design. His largest country house was Tusmore, Oxfordshire, built in a Palladian style between 1766 and 1769 for William Fermor. Of his small town houses, the most successful is The Wick, in Richmond. Designed in 1775 for Lady St Aubyn, the house has oval dining and drawing rooms. From 1794 to 1797 Mylne built a house for himself, The Grove, at Great Amwell.

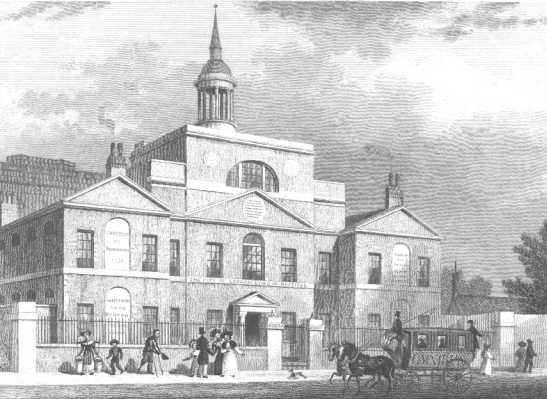
City of London Lying-in Hospital, 1770–1773

St Cecilia's Hall in Edinburgh was one of Mylne's first public buildings, built 1761–1763 for the Musical Society of Edinburgh. The oval, domed hall survives as part of Edinburgh University. Mylne's design for the City of London Lying-in Hospital, built 1770–1773, comprised a high central cupola flanked by pedimented blocks. Another public building, Stationers' Hall in London, was among his last architectural works, being refronted by him in 1800.

One or Mylne's earliest works for a private client was for Edward Southwell (1705–1755) whom he is reputed to have met in Rome when Southwell was on the Grand Tour and Mylne was there studying under Piranesi. Mylne's first work at Kings Weston House was in 1763 and involved designing and extensive new stables and kitchen garden complex which still remain. In the years following Mylne worked on extensively modernising Kings Weston House and replacing Sir John Vanbrugh's austere interiors. Here he created a suite of neo-classical rooms surrounding the remodelled Sallon which he filled with family portraits in refined carved architectural surrounds. His final work for Southwell was for a lodge house in 1768, the drawing for which he gave to his client.

In 1766, Mylne was appointed Surveyor to St Paul's Cathedral, completed by Sir Christopher Wren some 55 years earlier. Nominated by the Lord Mayor of London, his salary was £50 a year. In this capacity, Mylne was responsible for erecting a monument to Wren, whose only memorial at the time was in the basement. The existing Latin epitaph, Lector, si monumentum requiris, circumspice (reader, if you seek his monument, look around you), was re-used on a tablet mounted on the organ screen in 1810, although this was destroyed in the Blitz. He purchased over 200 of Wren's drawings, with his own money, and had them bound and presented to the cathedral, thus recording the building's history for posterity. On the death of Lord Nelson at Trafalgar in 1805, Mylne was partly responsible for the state funeral, building Nelson's sarcophagus in the Cathedral basement, although the design of the monument fell to James Wyatt of the Office of Works. Mylne, together with the manufacturer Matthew Boulton, arranged for a secret deposit of commemorative medals, of Boulton's making, to be placed inside the sarcophagus prior to Nelson's interment.

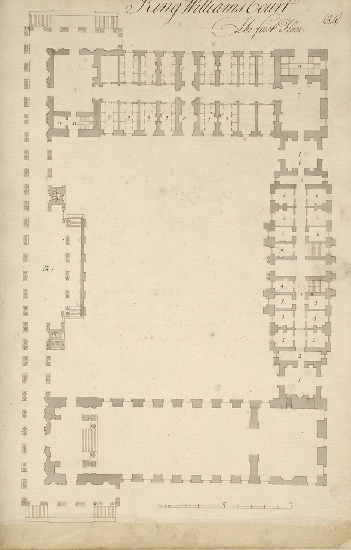
Mylne's drawing of King William's Court, Greenwich Hospital

In November 1775 he was also appointed clerk of works at Greenwich Hospital, another Wren building, under the surveyor James Stuart. At Greenwich he cleared unsightly workshops from the grounds, and laid out a series of walkways. He was later accused by the Lieutenant Governor, Captain Baillie, of misusing funds and occupying space required by the hospital's pensioners. Mylne responded by accusing Baillie of corruption, and the ensuing enquiry vindicated Mylne and led to the dismissal of Baillie in 1778. A fire the following January destroyed the chapel, but Mylne and his superior, James Stuart, failed to work together to design and build a replacement. Mylne made frequent requests to Stuart for drawings, but Stuart, who was gaining a reputation for drunkenness and unreliability, accused Mylne again of corruption and insulting behaviour. A second investigation again found no evidence, but it was clear that Mylne and Stuart could not work together. Stuart was the established figure, so it was Mylne, as the junior partner, who was dismissed. Disgusted at the outcome, he had to be forced from his offices, and successfully sued for damages.

He served as surveyor to Canterbury Cathedral.

== Engineering ==
From 1767 until his death, Mylne worked for the New River Company, whose head offices were adjacent to Blackfriars Bridge. He was initially hired as an assistant to the company surveyor Henry Mill, but took over on Mill's death in 1769. The company's offices burned down at Christmas of that year, offering Mylne the opportunity to design a replacement. Later, Mylne designed and erected a monument to Sir Hugh Myddelton, designer of the New River, at Great Amwell.

He was also involved in the development of the Eau Brink Cut, a new channel for the River Great Ouse in East Anglia. The project resulted in much litigation with his associate Sir Thomas Hyde Page.

== Projects ==
- Blackfriars Bridge (1761–1769)
- Remodelling of Kings Weston House (1763)
- Cally House, Kirkcudbright (1763)
- St Cecilia's Hall, Cowgate, Edinburgh (1765), the oldest purpose-built concert hall in Scotland
- Assembly Rooms, King Street, St James's, London (1765)
- Various works at Welbeck Abbey, Nottinghamshire (1760s)
- Blaise Castle, Bristol (1766)
- Wormleybury Manor, Hertfordshire (1767–1769)
- The Hunterian Medical School, Great Windmill Street, London (1767); the building now forms part of the Lyric Theatre.
- Tusmore House, Oxfordshire (1770)
- Alterations to Goodnestone House, Kent (1770)
- Addington Palace, near Croydon, south London (1773–1779)
- Bryngwyn House, Powys, Wales (1774)
- The Wick, Richmond, London (1775)
- Inveraray village, and interior remodelling of Inveraray Castle, Scotland (1780s and 1790s)
- Middle Bridge, Romsey, Hampshire (1783)
- Gloucester and Sharpness Canal (1790s)
- Cardigan House, Richmond, London, 1791–1793
- Clachan Bridge linking the island of Seil to the Scottish mainland (completed 1792)
- Holy Trinity Church, Dartford (1792)
- Hexham Bridge (1793)
- Dearne & Dove Canal, South Yorkshire (1793–1804)
- New frontage to Stationers' Hall, off Fleet Street, London (1800)
- Works at Great Amwell, Hertfordshire, for the New River Company, London (until 1810)

== Family ==
Robert had been intended as his father's successor, but his established position in London meant that his younger brother William took on the family business on Thomas Mylne's death in February 1763. William was commissioned to build Edinburgh's new North Bridge later in the decade, but the structure partially collapsed in 1769, killing five people. Robert was one of his brother's financial guarantors, and was involved in the subsequent problems for several years, until William, his architectural career over, fled to America in 1773. He returned two years later, at which time Robert obtained him a job running the Dublin Waterworks. On William's death in 1790, Robert had a plaque erected to his memory in St Catherine's Church, Dublin.

In September 1770, Robert married Mary Home, the daughter of an army surgeon, leading to a rift between Mylne and his sister, who disliked the Home family. The couple resided at the Water House, New River Head, and had nine children:

- Maria (1772–1794)
- Emilia (born 1773)
- Harriet (born 1774)
- Caroline (born 1775), married Colonel Duncan of the East India Company, 1797
- Robert (1779–1798)
- William Chadwell (1781–1863)
- Thomas (1782, died aged six months)
- Charlotte (born 1785)
- Leonora (born 1788)

Mary Mylne died of a lung complaint in July 1797, shortly after the family had moved to Great Amwell. Robert designed a mausoleum for his wife and family, which still stands in the churchyard of St John the Baptist. Burials in the vault included his descendant, the antiquarian Rev Robert Scott Mylne FRSE (1854–1920).

Robert junior was initially intended for an architectural career, and was apprenticed to Henry Holland. However, this was unsuccessful, and Robert joined the army as an ensign in 1797. Sailing for Gibraltar, his ship was captured, and he spent the following year in a French prison. Setting out again for Gibraltar after his return, he died on board ship in December 1798. It was therefore William's role to take over from his father, which he did, being appointed surveyor to the New River on his father's retirement in 1810.
