= Lonsdale Square =

Garden square in Islington, London, England

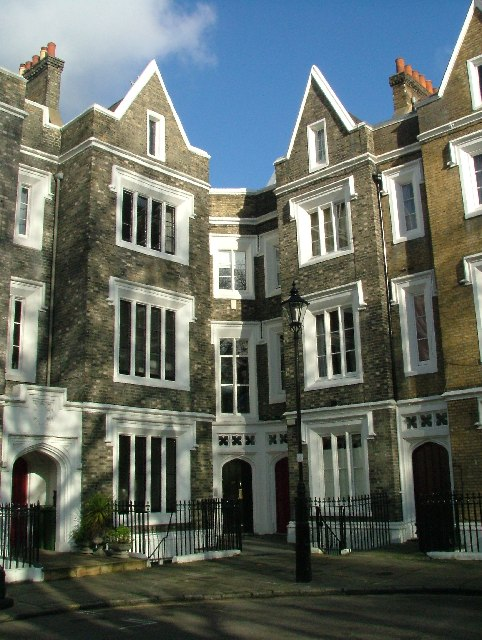
- Lonsdale Square - north-east corner of the square

- Location within London Borough of Islington
- Postal code: N1
- Coordinates: 51.539588°N 0.108206°W

Construction
- Construction start: 1838
- Completion: 1845

Lonsdale Square is a garden square in the Barnsbury district of Islington, North London. It is bounded by unusual Tudor Gothic Revival terraced houses, with picturesque gables and Elizabethan-style windows, and is probably unique among squares. All the houses are listed buildings. The central public garden contains flower beds and mature trees.

The nearest tube stations are Highbury & Islington to the north-east and Angel to the south-east. The Anglican parish is Barnsbury, an early offshoot of Islington.

== History ==
The land on which the square was built was named Gosseyfield or the Gossey Field, and had been left to the Worshipful Company of Drapers in 1690 by the daughter of John Walter, one of its former Clerks, for the support of almshouses in Southwark and Newington. The area was rural, and in 1818 was being used as a cattle-pen for herds going to Smithfield Livestock Market. In the 1830s the Drapers' Company joined the race to build in Islington, appointing as architect their own surveyor Richard Cromwell Carpenter, who was also district surveyor for East Islington. Carpenter's father, also named Richard, had been the first Surveyor for the Drapers' Company Estate and had drawn up plans for pairs of classical houses on the site. His son became Company Surveyor after his father's death in 1839 and completed the scheme to his own design. Carpenter was a friend of Augustus Pugin, and built Gothic Revival churches and almshouses elsewhere, and De Beauvoir Square in Hackney, before his early death at the age of 42. Lonsdale Square was laid out in 1838, and built between about 1838 and 1845. Drawings for the square were exhibited at the 1841 Royal Academy exhibition.

The initial house leases stipulated single-family occupation, and the original occupants of the square were predominantly comfortable middle-class, with a third of them in 1851 being in religious orders, perhaps attracted by the ecclesiastical style of the buildings. Charles Booth’s poverty map of c.1890 shows most Lonsdale Square households as “Middle class. Well-to-do.”

As with most of Islington, the square's prosperity sank in the early 20th century, and the houses were let as furnished rooms in multiple occupation. The Drapers' Company auctioned the square in 1954 when it had become down-at-heel. In the 1960s the square, as with much of Islington, had a revival and its individual architectural style had great appeal to middle-class families. The houses were rehabilitated by owner-occupiers, with some converted to flats, and it became newly fashionable.

== Description ==
The tall brick town houses have steep gables (tapering upper walls), mullioned (transomed) cream-dressed windows and alike-dressed steep, triangular cornices, arched, dark front doors and formal street-side railings. The houses are of Gothic Revival dimensions, ornamentation, interiors and colouring by Carpenter, with wholly below-street level basements and slight projections to the main bays which are of aged yellow (yellow-grey-brown) brick with stone dressings.

The Tudor features, especially the high gables resembling Tudor rooftops, may have been inspired by the site's almshouse connection. On the east and west sides the front doors have triple quatrefoils for fanlights, and on the north and south sides, blind multi-foil sunk panels. At the angles, the doors are oddly grouped in threes, with the centre house extending outwards at the back. The south-west corner only had a facade until the mid 1960s, when the space behind the facade was infilled by an ingeniously contrived building providing two maisonettes and a flat by Peter Foggo, one of the founders of Arup Associates. It was later converted into a single family house.

The houses have rear gardens, and are listed in the middle (second-rarest) category of the national scheme for the recognition and protection of buildings, Grade II* listed. There is a residents' association, the Lonsdale Square Society.

The two approach roads (north and south) share its name. The public house at the end of the northern approach road has been named The Drapers Arms [sic] since at least 1851, and is in a Classical style, with long arched windows set between pilasters. Starting in the 1990s, it was one of London's earliest gastropubs.

== Garden ==
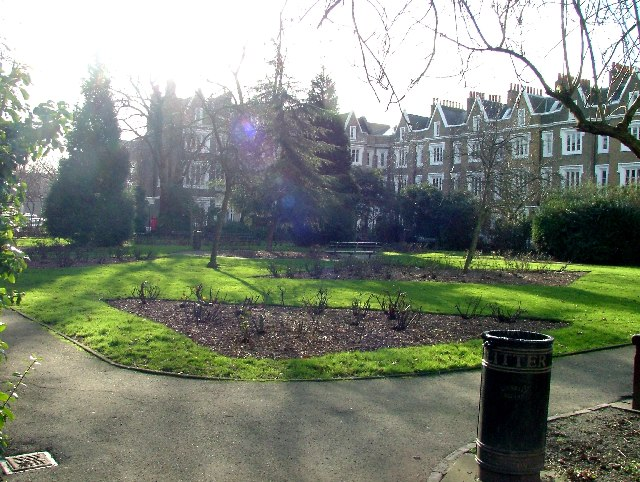
Lonsdale Square - the central gardens

The central garden remained privately owned, with a gardener, until Islington Council acquired it in 1960 for a nominal £50 and opened it to the public.

The garden railings were removed during the Second World War, and the chain-link fences only replaced with proper railings in 1970/71.

The garden contains mature London plane and beech trees, conifers, bushes and flower beds, and occupies 0.19 hectares (0.47 acres).

== Notable residents ==
- William Harvey (1796-1873), 'surgeon in London and Hon. Supt. of Islington Reformatory', and antiquary and writer, lived at 48 Lonsdale Square and died there on 18 March 1873. He wrote articles for the City Press under the pseudonym 'Aleph', and was the author of London Scenes and London People (1863) and The Old City, and its Highways and Byways (1865).
- George R. Sims (1847-1922), journalist, dramatist, novelist and bon vivant lived at no. 30 in 1878-79.
- Richard Rodney Bennett (1936-2012), composer, owned a house on the square.
- Salman Rushdie (1947- ), author, lived in a basement apartment mentioned in his memoir, Joseph Anton: A Memoir.
- Simon Rattle (1955- ), conductor, had a home on the square.

== See also ==
- List of works by R. C. Carpenter
