= Robert Percy Smith =

British politician (1770–1845)

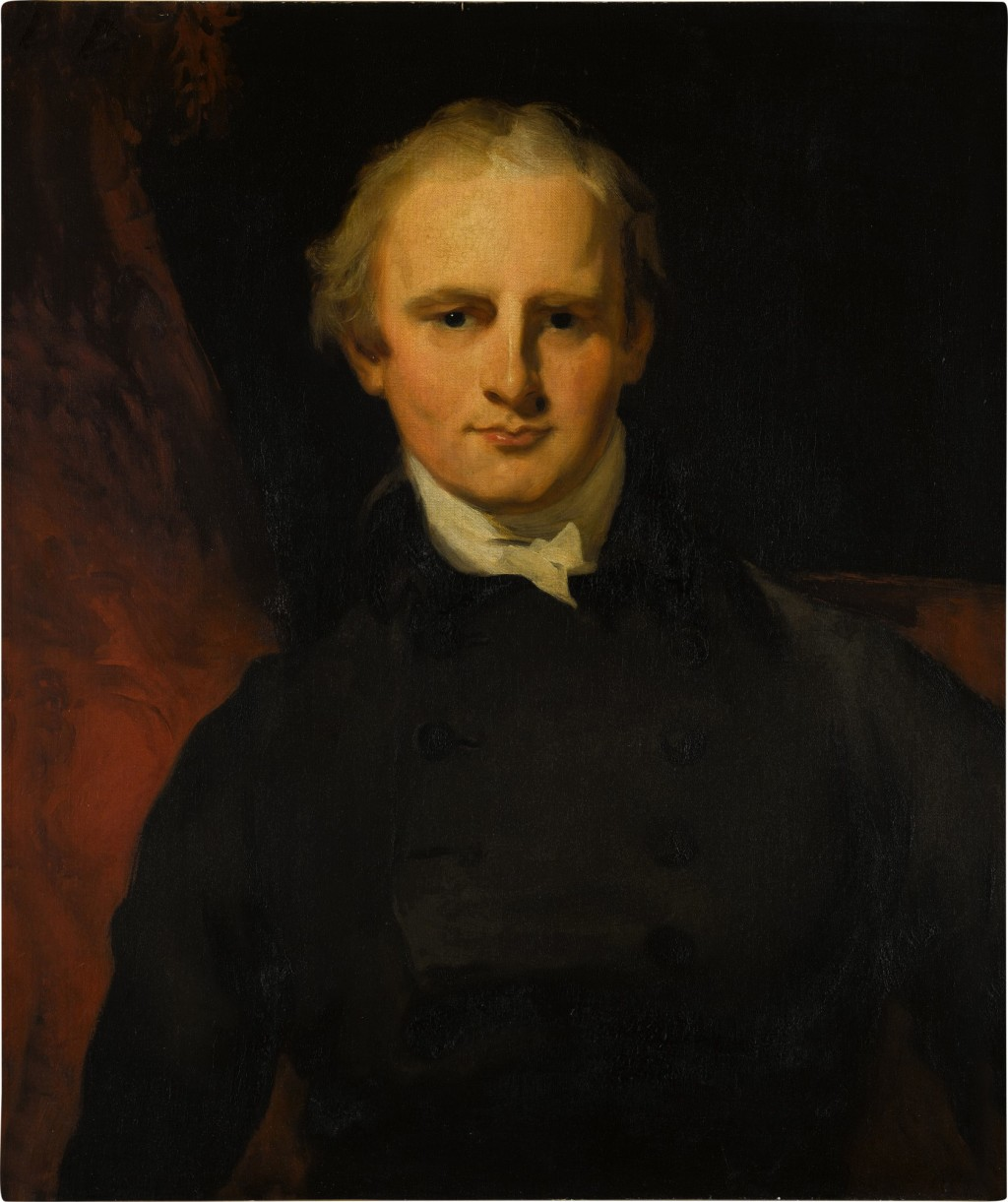
Portrait of Robert Percy Smith by Thomas Lawrence

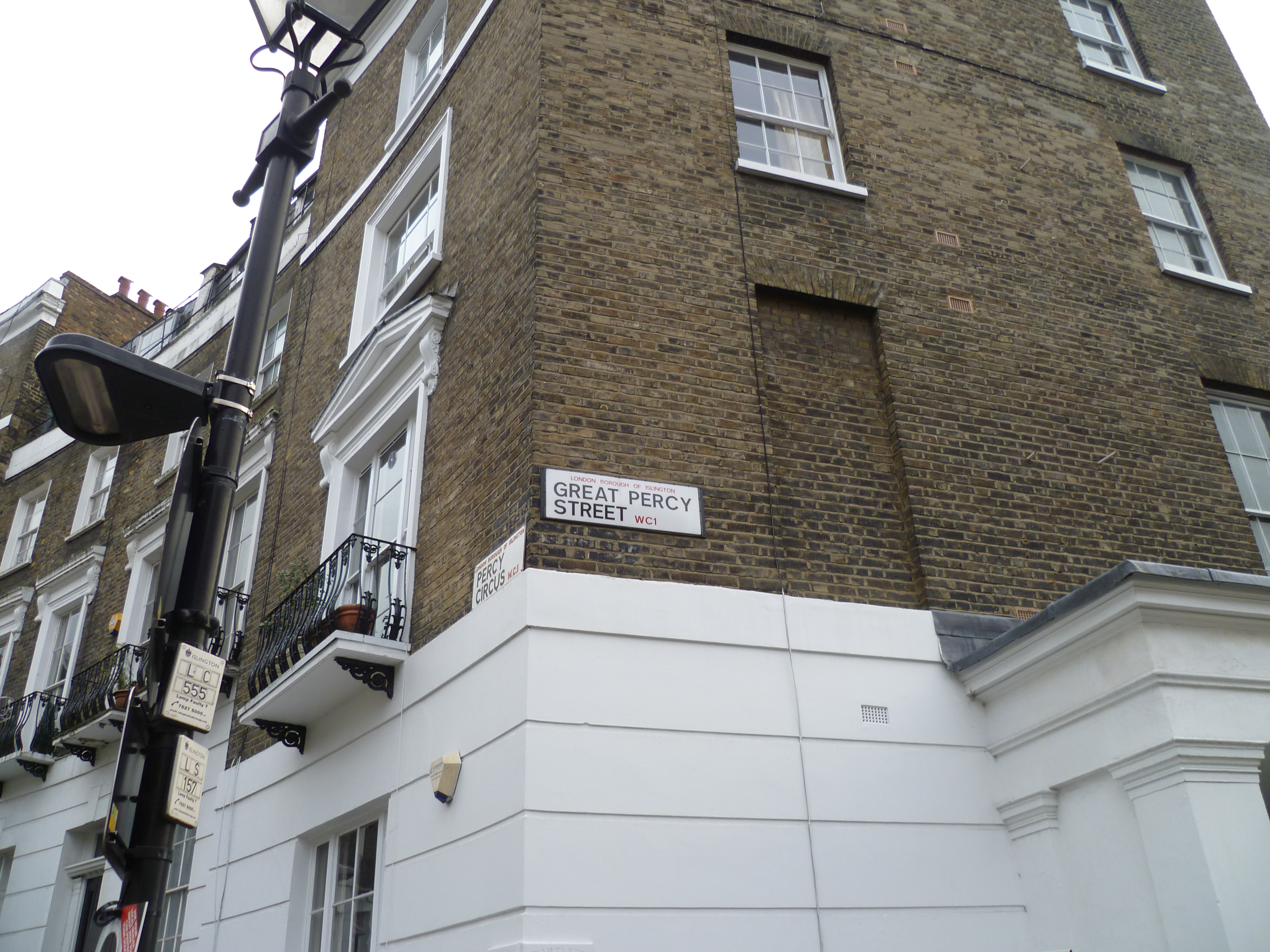
Great Percy Street and Percy Circus in London, named after Robert Percy Smith

Robert "Bobus" Percy Smith (7 May 1770 – 10 March 1845) was a British lawyer, Member of Parliament, and Judge Advocate-General of Bengal, India.

Smith was eldest son of Robert Smith, and brother of the writer and clergyman Sydney Smith. He entered Eton College in 1782, and became very intimate with John Hookham Frere, George Canning, and Henry Vassall-Fox, 3rd Baron Holland. With them in 1786 he started the school magazine entitled The Microcosm, which ran for forty volumes, and procured for Smith an introduction to Queen Charlotte. In 1788, he became a scholar on Dr. Battie's foundation, and in 1791 won the Browne Medal for the best Latin ode. In the same year he entered King's College, Cambridge, and graduated B.A. in 1794 and M.A. in 1797. On 4 July of the same year he was called to the bar of Lincoln's Inn.

In 1803, through the influence of William Petty, first Marquess of Lansdowne, and Sir Francis Baring, he obtained the appointment of Judge Advocate General of Bengal. In seven years, he returned to England with a fortune, and settled in London. While in India he lent his brother Sydney £100 a year (equivalent to £9,000 in 2025), and on his return in 1810 lent him £500 (equivalent to £34,000 in 2025) towards the expenses of his move into the country, and gave £100 a year to support Sydney's eldest son at Westminster School.

In 1812, Smith entered House of Commons as member for Grantham, but made no reputation as a speaker. At the general election of 1818 he contested Lincoln unsuccessfully, but two years later he won the seat and sat as the representative of the borough until his retirement after the dissolution of 1826.

Although Robert never attained the same level of fame as his brother Sydney—with whom his relationship was always affectionate—those who knew both men considered "Bobus" to equal, if not surpass, Sydney in "the very qualities for which the younger was renowned"; he was considered "a man of great originality, a profound thinker, and of wide grasp of mind. His wit was proverbial... his conversation provoked the admiration of Madam de Staël." Canning referred to his language as "the essence of English"; Landor declared that "his Latin hexameters would not have discredited Lucretius". Smith's son published a number of his Latin verses, as "Early Writings of Robert Percy Smith" (Chiswick, 1850, quarto).

Smith was also a member of the New River Company, who developed part of Finsbury as the head of the New River, and Percy Circus in Finsbury is named after him.

== Personal life ==
His country residence was at Cheam, Surrey. In 1797 Smith married Caroline, daughter of Richard Vernon, M.P. for Tavistock. She was half-sister of the mothers of the third Lord Holland and of the third Lord Lansdowne. By her Smith was father of Robert Vernon, who became a prominent Liberal politician and was created Baron Lyveden in 1859.

Smith died on 10 March 1845 at his house in Savile Row, London.

Parliament of the United Kingdom
Preceded by Sir William Earle Welby, Bt. Thomas Thoroton	Member of Parliament for Grantham; 1812–1818; With: Sir William Earle Welby, Bt.	Succeeded by Sir William Earle Welby, Bt. Edward Cust
Preceded by Coningsby Waldo-Sibthorpe; Ralph Bernal	Member of Parliament for Lincoln; 1820–1826; With: Coningsby Waldo-Sibthorpe 1820–1822; John Williams 1822–1826	Succeeded by John Nicholas Fazakerley; Charles Delaet Waldo Sibthorp
