= Amwell Street =

Street in London, England

Coordinates: 51.528022°N 0.109815°W

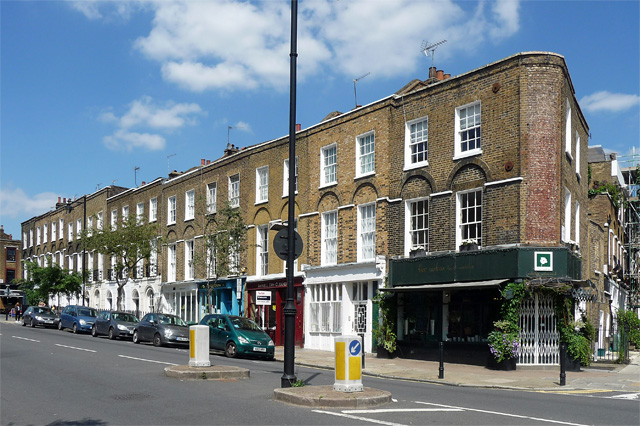
Shops in Amwell Street

Amwell Street is a street that runs north to south from Pentonville Road to Rosebury Avenue in the Clerkenwell and Angel areas of London. The road forms the eastern boundary of the Lloyd Baker Estate in the south and intersects the New River Estate in the north.

== History and description ==
Amwell Street follows the route of an old field path, developed beginning in 1824 along with the New River Estate and Lloyd Baker Estate. These sites were developed beginning in the 1810s into the 1850s.

In 1820, it was decided to use the existing path for the route of the new street. Built on the edge of the New River Company's land, Lloyd Baker agreed to have the houses along the western side of the street built in the style of William Chadwell Mylne who worked for the New River Company rather than in the style of his own estate. Both sides of the street were mostly built up by 1825, known originally as Union Street. The name was changed in 1826 to Amwell Street, named after Amwell in Hertfordshire, the site of one of the sources of the New River.

The street is lined with a number of shops and houses and on top of shopkeepers attracted a number of craftspeople, particularly jewellers, and tradespeople as its residents. Among the most notable residents is George Cruikshank who lived at Nos. 69 then 71 from 1824 to 1849. It was living here that he would produce his print London Going out of Town – or The March of Bricks & Mortar! which depicted the rapid urban expansion of London. Other artists and engravers included George Childs and Samuel Lacey.

== See also ==
- Great Percy Street
- Amwell Cottage
