= List of mayors of Finsbury =

This is a list of mayors of the Metropolitan Borough of Finsbury. The borough was a Metropolitan borough within the County of London from 1900 to 1965, covering the wards of Clerkenwell and Bunhill, when it was amalgamated with the Metropolitan Borough of Islington to form the London Borough of Islington.

== Mayors ==
- 1900–1901 Enos Howes
- 1901–1902 Enos Howes (second term)
- 1902–1903 James Gibson
- 1903–1904 Middleton Chapman – died 1922
- 1904–1905 William Howes
- 1905–1906 William Reason
- 1906–1907 Rev. George Henry Perry
- 1907–1908 Rev. George Henry Perry (second term)
- 1908–1909 Dr. William Alfred Dingle
- 1909–1910 Arthur Millward
- 1910–1911 Edward Henry Tripp
- 1911–1912 Lieutenant-Colonel Henry Baldwin Barton
- 1912–1913 Lieutenant-Colonel Henry Baldwin Barton (second term)
- 1913–1914 William Richard Corke
- 1914–1915 William Richard Corke (second term)
- 1915–1916 Lieutenant-Colonel Henry Baldwin Barton (third term)
- 1916–1917 Lieutenant-Colonel Henry Baldwin Barton (fourth term)
- 1917–1918 Lieutenant-Colonel Henry Baldwin Barton (fifth term)
- 1918–1919 Lieutenant-Colonel Henry Baldwin Barton (sixth term)
- 1919–1920 Lieutenant-Colonel Henry Baldwin Barton (seventh term)
- 1920–1921 Lieutenant-Colonel Henry Baldwin Barton: knighted 1921 (eighth term)
- 1921–1922 Charles James Sabourin
- 1922–1923 William Richard Corke (third term)
- 1923–1924 Otho William Nicholson
- 1924–1925 John Thomas Wallis
- 1925–1926 John Thomas Wallis (second term)
- 1926–1927 Stephen Geoffrey Nunn
- 1927–1928 Charles James Sabourin (second term)
- 1928–1929 Charles James Sabourin (third term)
- 1929–1930 William Harry Martin
- 1930–1931 Charles Robert Simpson
- 1931–1932 Stephen Geoffrey Nunn (second term)
- 1932–1933 Henry Kennett
- 1933–1934 George Tripp
- 1934–1935 Charles Henry Simmons
- 1935–1936 Charles Henry Simmons (second term)
- 1936–1937 Eva Martin
- 1937–1938 Charles Alfred Allen
- 1938–1939 Chuni Lal Katial
- 1939–1940 William Lewis Prowse
- 1940–1941 Henry James Dainty
- 1941–1942 William Francis Drake
- 1942–1943 Joseph Alfred Gannon
- 1943–1944 Ald. Harold Riley
- 1944–1945 Frederick John Barrett
- 1945–1946 Eleanor Allen
- 1946–1947 Rosa Curtis
- 1947–1949 W. Barrie
- 1949–1950 George Alfred Curtis
- 1950–1951 Charles Hector McDonald
- 1951–1952 Philip Bendel
- 1952–1953 Ald. Ernest Frederick Johnson
- 1953–1954 Christie Payne
- 1954–1955 Leslie James Harley
- 1955–1956 Christie Payne
- 1956–1957 Michael Cliffe
- 1957–1958 Michael Cliffe
- 1958–1959 Albert Smith
- 1959–1960 Joseph Trotter
- 1960–1961 Catherine Griffiths
- 1961–1962 William Charles Comley
- 1962–1963 Charles Slater
- 1963–1964 Arthur Goldshaw
- 1964–1965 Samuel William Withey
