= Edmund Colthurst =

English landowner (c.1545–1616)

Edmund Colthurst (c. 1545 – 1616) was a wealthy English landowner who inherited the former monastic estates of Hinton Priory and Bath Abbey, Somerset, following the death of his father in 1559. He was the son of Matthew Colthurst and Anne Grimston. He married Elinor de la Rivere (d. 1586), daughter of Thomas de la Rivere, with whom he had eight children.

In 1572 he donated Bath Abbey church to the city authorities, but retained the rest of the former priory precinct for his own use. He sold Hinton Priory in 1578.

By c. 1600, Colthurst had become a colonist on the Munster Plantation, where he is recorded as 'farmer of the castle and manor of Lysfynny' (Lisfinny Castle), near Tallow. Lisfinny Castle is a tower house that formed part of an estate that Sir Walter Raleigh granted to Edmund's brother Andrew in return for his support during the Second Desmond Rebellion of the 1580s; his brother Thomas leased a similar property known as Shean Castle. Edmund Colthurst stated that he had defended Lisfinny Castle from attack, presumably during the Nine Years' War of the 1590s.

In 1602, Colthurst proposed creating an artificial watercourse, known as the New River, to supply drinking water to London and obtained a charter from King James I to construct it in 1604. After surveying the route and digging the first two-mile long stretch, Colthurst encountered financial difficulties. Some funding was proposed by an Act of Parliament in 1606 but ultimately it fell to Colthurst's partner, Sir Hugh Myddelton, to complete the work between 1609 and its official opening on 29 September 1613. Colthurst sold his remaining Bath property to John Hall of Bradford-on-Avon in 1612 and died four years later.

Colthurst is commemorated in the names of Colthurst Gardens in Hoddesdon, Colthurst Drive in Edmonton, and Colthurst Crescent in Finsbury Park, all close to the route of the New River.
