= St Mark's Church, Myddelton Square =

Church in Clerkenwell, London

Coordinates: 51°31′48″N 0°06′31″W

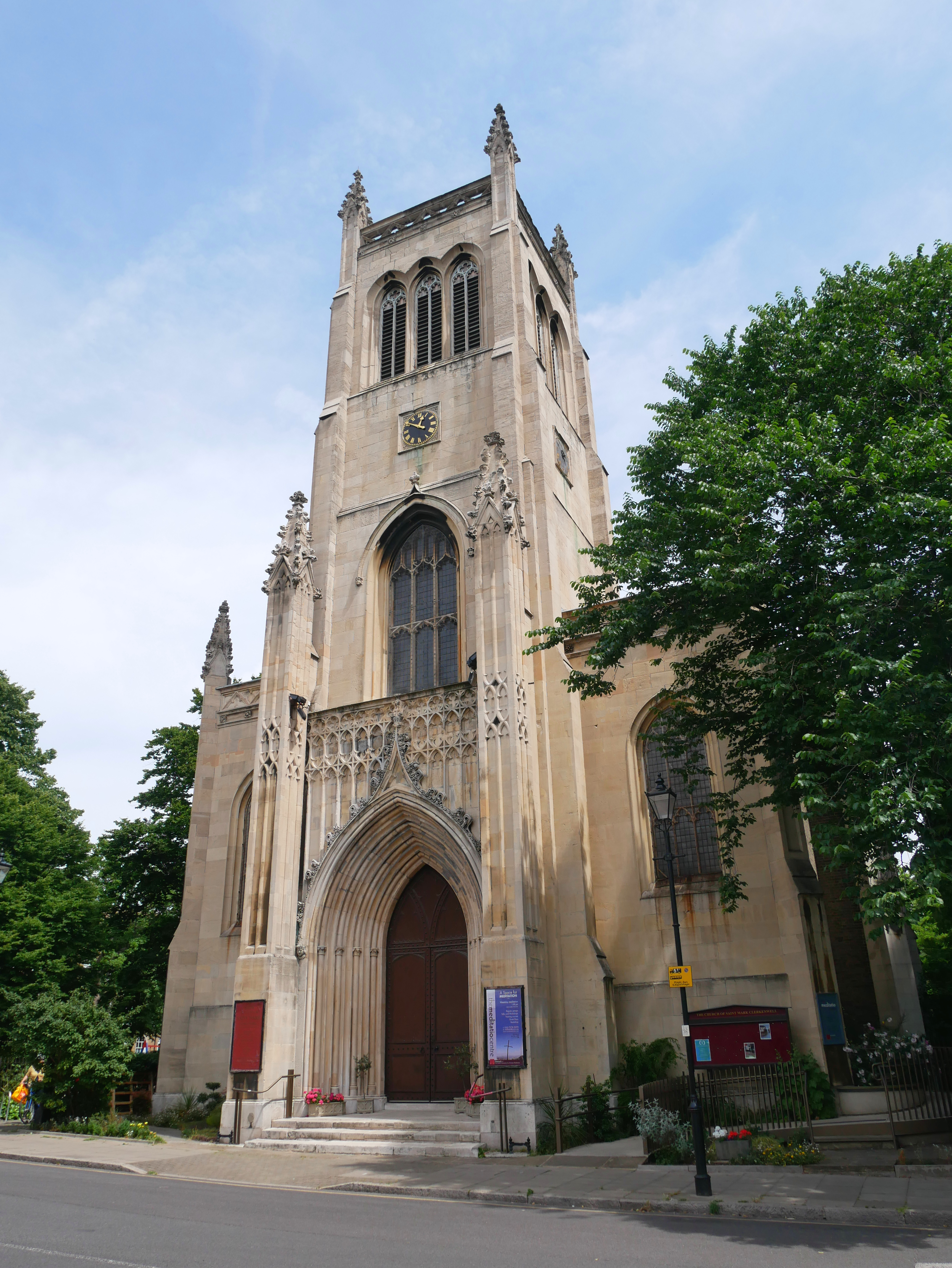
The tower on the west end of St Mark's Church

St Mark's Church is an Anglican church in the middle of Myddelton Square, the largest square in London's Clerkenwell district.

The square was laid out by William Chadwell Mylne, and there are 75 houses, by 13 different builders, all constructed in a Georgian style, from 1824 to 1836.

St Mark's Church was built in 1825–27, and designed by William Chadwell Mylne. It is in a plain Gothic style, was built to accommodate 2000 people and cost about £18,000. It has a 90 ft (27 m) west tower.

The east window depicts the Ascension and was designed by AE Buss of Goddard & Gibbs in 1962.

The converted Church Hall and Chapel rooms have been shared with the World Community for Christian Meditation since 2002.

The church is Grade II listed.
