= New River (London) =

Artificial waterway in London, opened 1613

Coordinates: 51.7451°N 0.0138°W

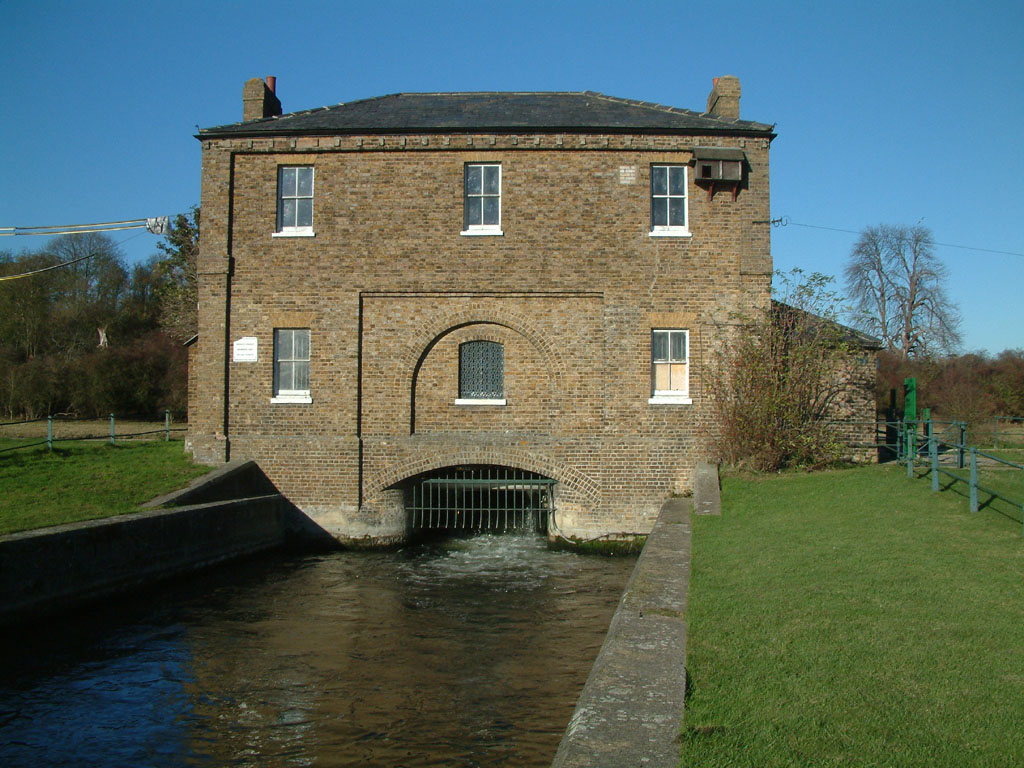
The New Gauge House (1856) where water leaves the River Lea at the start of the New River

Map

The New River is an artificial waterway in England, opened in 1613 to supply London with fresh drinking water taken from Chadwell and Amwell Springs near Ware in Hertfordshire, and later the River Lea and other sources.

Originally conceived by Edmund Colthurst and completed by Hugh Myddelton, it was operated by the New River Company for nearly 300 years until London's water supply was taken over by the Metropolitan Water Board in 1904.

Although it was once threatened with closure, a large section of the New River remains part of London's water supply infrastructure, today operated by Thames Water, more than 400 years after it was first constructed.

The New River originally followed the land contours but certain parts have been straightened over the centuries. There is a designated walking route along the canal called the New River Path. It is a 28-mile (45 km) long-distance footpath which follows the course of the New River as closely as possible from its source in Hertfordshire to its original end in Islington, London.

== Route ==
It starts between Ware and Hertford in Hertfordshire and today runs 20 miles (32 km) down to Stoke Newington. Among the districts it flows through are (from north to south):

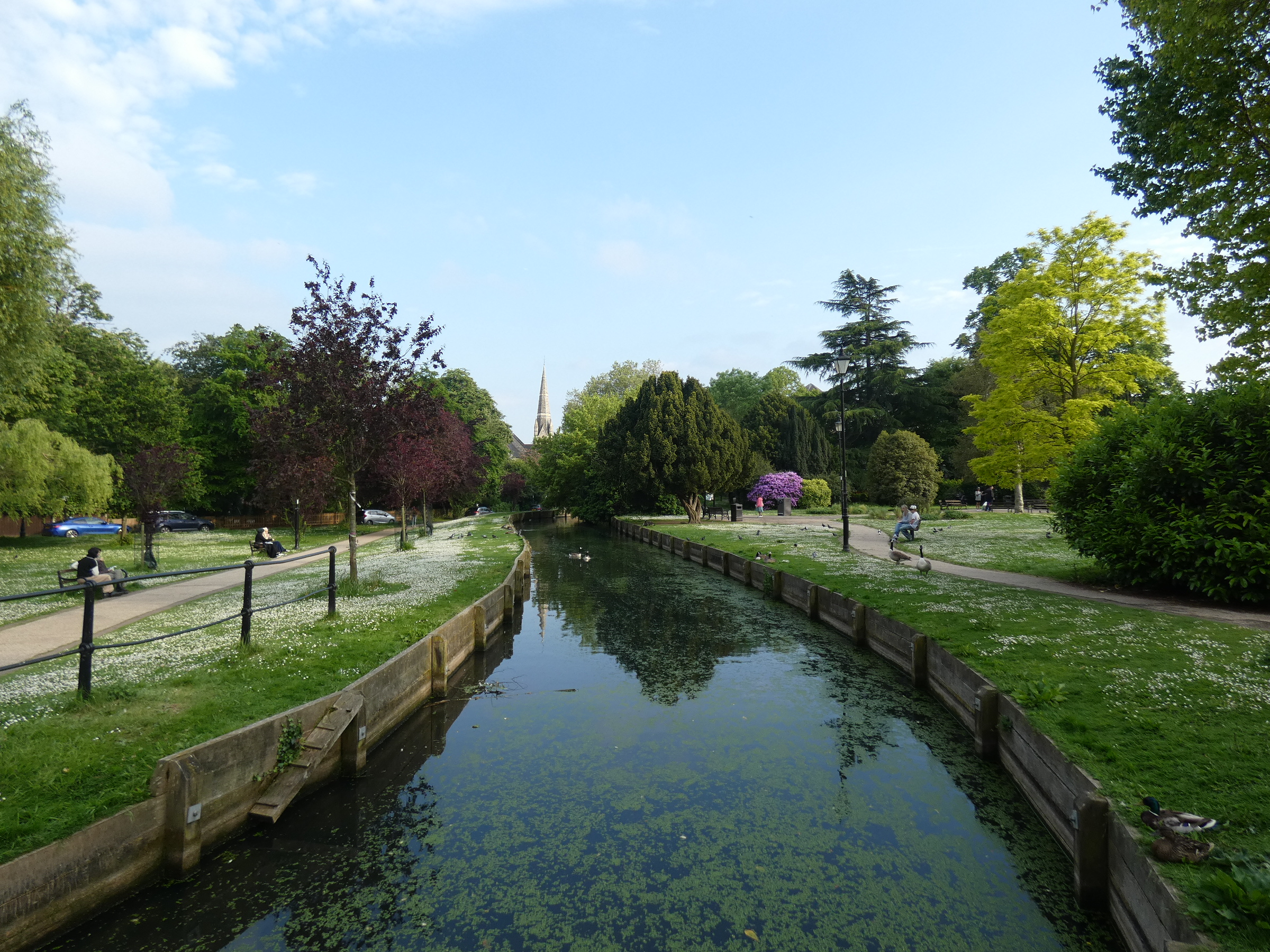
The New River Loop in Enfield

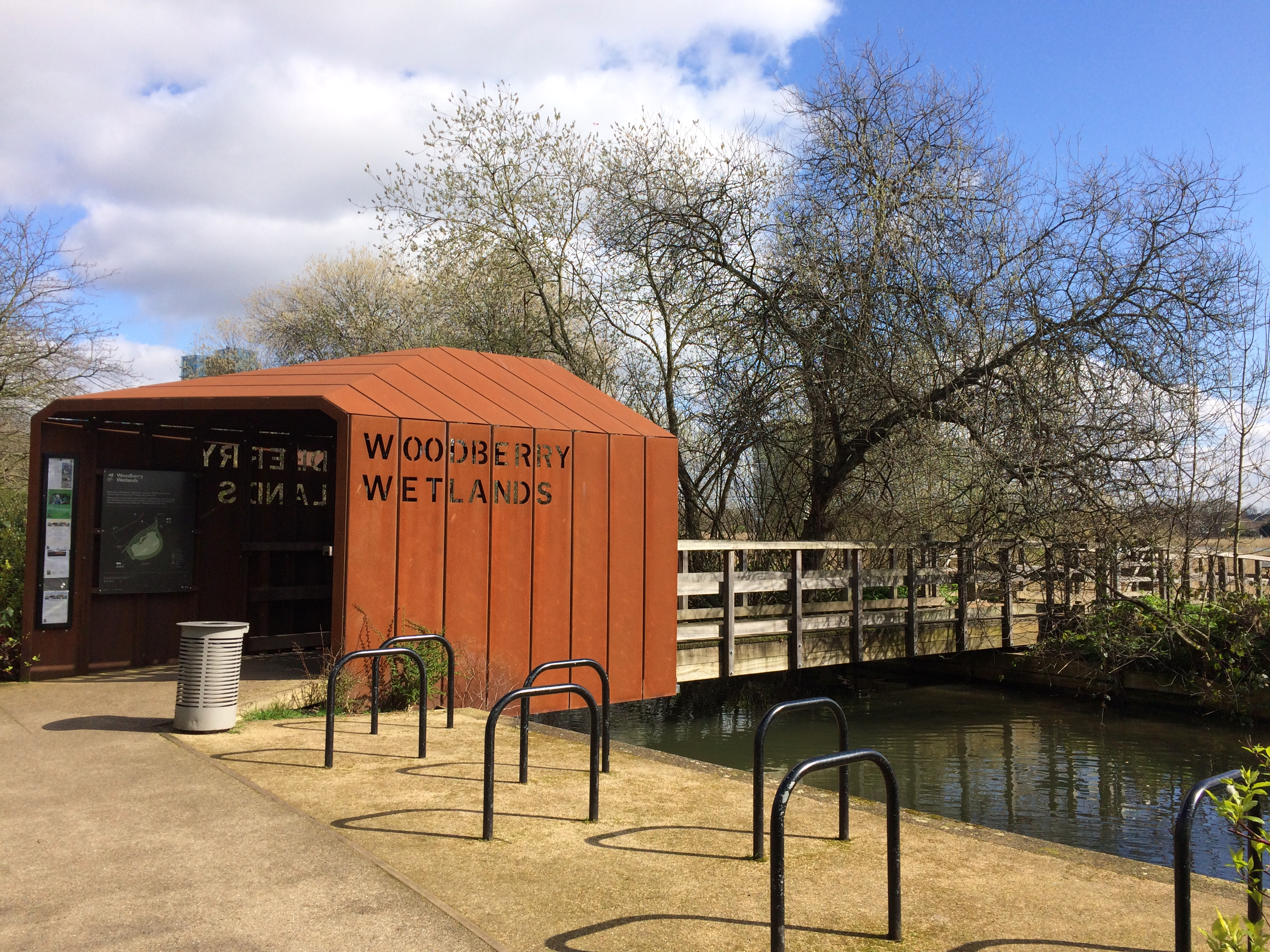
Woodberry Wetlands entrance with bridge over New River

- Great Amwell
- Hoddesdon
- Broxbourne
- Cheshunt
- Enfield
- Palmers Green
- Bowes Park
- Wood Green (passing close to Alexandra Palace)
- Hornsey
- Harringay
- Finsbury Park

Its original termination, near Clerkenwell, Islington, became known as the New River Head where the water filled a large cistern – the Round Pond – next to the current location of Sadler's Wells theatre — where water from the river was used to flood a large tank to stage an Aquatic Theatre at the beginning of the nineteenth century.

In 1946, the water supply to New River Head was truncated at Stoke Newington with the New River ending at the East Reservoir. The reservoir is managed as the Woodberry Wetlands – a nature reserve and designated Site of Metropolitan Importance.

== Construction ==
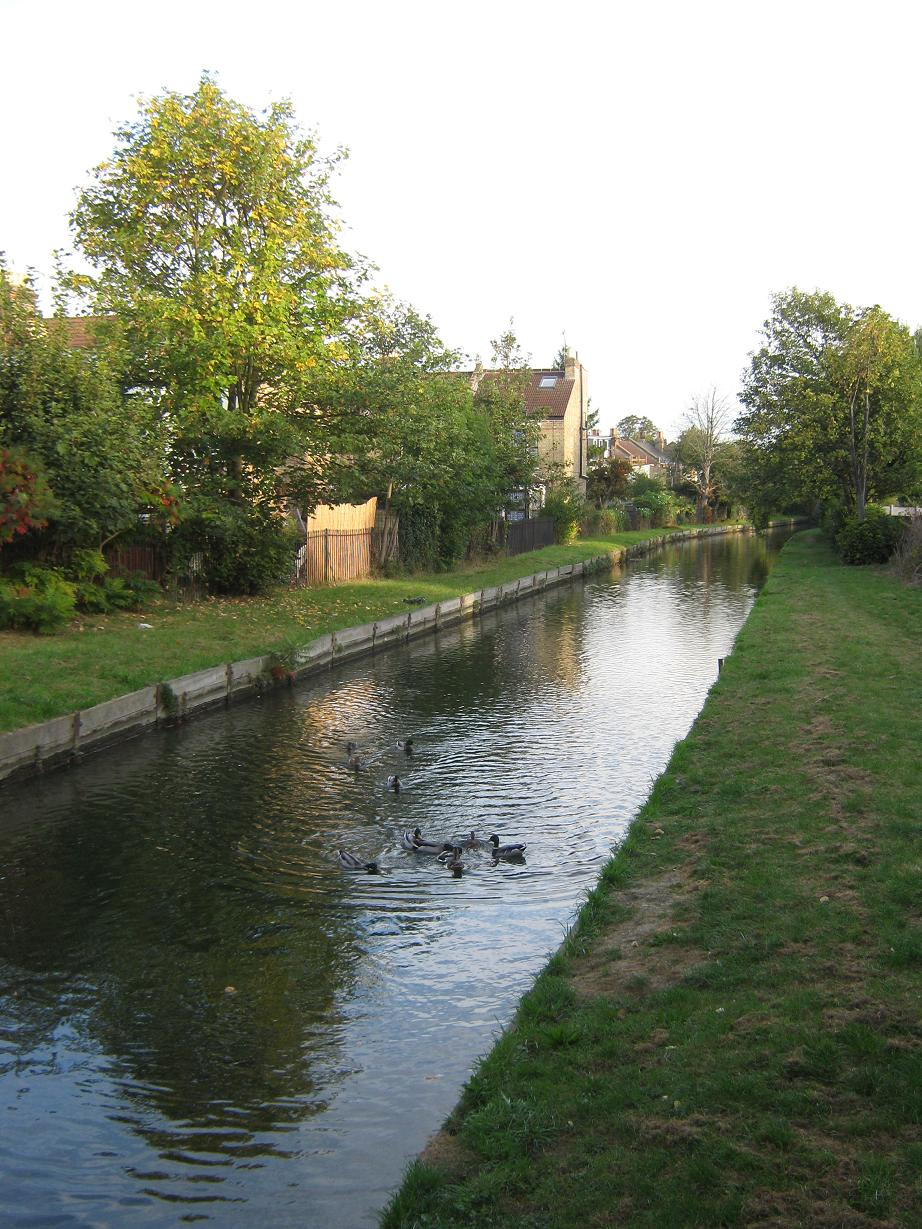
Straight section of the New River passing through Bowes Park.

The design and construction of the New River is often attributed solely to Hugh Myddelton. In 1602, Edmund Colthurst first proposed the idea of digging an artificial waterway to supply London from Chadwell and Amwell springs near Ware in Hertfordshire, and obtained a charter from King James I in 1604 to carry it out. However, much of the water was obtained from streams tapped along its route, including the Hackney Brook.

After surveying the route and digging the first 2-mile (3 km) stretch, Colthurst encountered financial difficulties and it fell to Myddelton to complete the work between 1609 and its official opening on 29 September 1613. The project was also rescued by the King personally, whose house and lands at Theobalds Park were crossed by the river. James took half of the shares in 1612 for a half of the profits.

The expense and engineering challenges of the project—it relied on gravity to allow the water to flow, carefully following the contours of the terrain from Ware into London, and dropping around just five inches per mile (8 cm/km)—were not Myddelton's only worries. He also faced considerable opposition from landowners who feared that the New River would reduce the value of their farmland (they argued that floods or overflowing might create quagmires that could trap livestock); others were concerned at the possible disruption to road transport networks between Hertfordshire and the capital. The project nearly foundered when a few landowners flatly refused to agree to allow the river across their land.

When it was originally constructed, long sections, for example around Forty Hall and in Hornsey, wound around the heads of small tributary valleys of the Lea. Other sections of the river, including the one in Harringay, were carried across valleys in wooden aqueducts lined with lead and supported by strong timbers and brick piers. In at least one section, locals referred to the river as the boarded river. Improvements in canal construction in the eighteenth century led to these sections being replaced by clay-banked canals.

In 1620, the New River Company found that the springs were not sufficient to supply their customers, and dug a half-mile extension to feed the New River from the nearby River Lea to supplement the water from the springs. A mechanical gauge regulates the amount taken.

On 9 January 1622 King James I rode from Theobalds after dinner to see the ice on the New River and fell in head first so that his companions could only see his boots. He was rescued by Sir Richard Young and returned to a warm bed at Theobalds.

== Later alterations ==
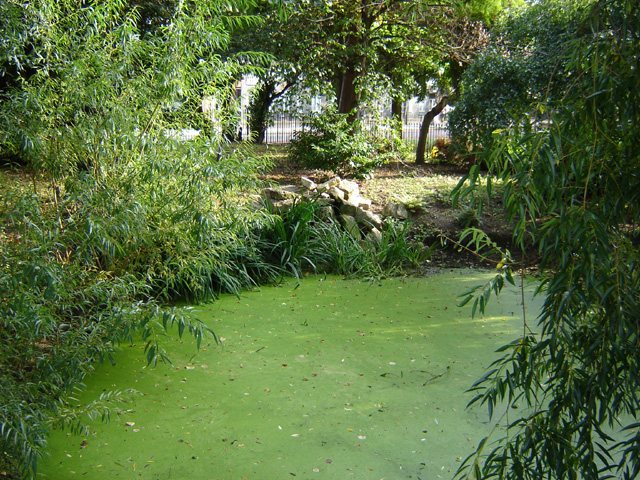
The New River in Clissold Park, Stoke Newington. This short section of the New River was recreated as an amenity for the park after long abandonment. (September 2005)

Originally the New River's course was above ground throughout, but in the second half of the 19th century some sections were put underground, enabling the course to be straightened.

A winding original section of the channel that used to run through the town centre of Enfield has been cut off from the main flow, but is still maintained as an important local civic amenity called the New River Loop. The New River was returned to its original course along the Enfield Loop for a period between 1940 and 1952 after a bomb hit the pipes run to divert it.

Another large loop originally ran around the Devonshire Hill area in north Wood Green and southern Enfield. This loop was cut off when the Wood Green tunnel, which starts at Bowes Park, was completed in 1852. The loop existed for some decades, but was completely filled in and lost by the early 1900s. Now entirely covered by residential development dating mostly back to the 1930s, its former course is visible on numerous maps drawn in the 1800s and early 1900s.

In March 1946, the last filter beds at New River Head were decommissioned to make way for the Metropolitan Water Board's new offices, and the section of the New River south of Stoke Newington was abandoned. In 1950, the pipes used to carry the water in this section were excavated, and some were reused elsewhere in the water supply network.

The New River Aqueduct (51°40'58.6"N 0°03'16.0"W) was built in 1985 to carry the New River, then running on an embankment, over the London Orbital Motorway (M25) which was then being constructed. The aqueduct carries the river in two parallel concrete boxes each 90 m long, 4.25 m wide and 2 m deep. The double box design allowed the temporary diversion of the river during construction and also enables maintenance to be undertaken on either side without stopping the flow.

== Present day ==
The New River is still in use today, transferring around 220 million litres of water per day — 8% of London's total use.

Near Turkey Brook in Enfield, water is taken from the New River via the Northern Transfer Tunnel, which feeds King George V Reservoir at the top of the Lee Valley Reservoir Chain. Further south, adjacent to Alexandra Park, water is taken from the New River for treatment at Hornsey Water Treatment Works. The New River now terminates at the East Reservoir in Stoke Newington, into which its flow is entirely diverted. Water from Stoke Newington is transferred to the lower end of the Lee Valley reservoirs via the Amhurst Main, which has a capacity of 90 million litres per day, for treatment at the Coppermills Water Treatment Works.

During times of low water flow, the New River can be supplemented with water pumped from a series of boreholes along its route, with this water being treated at Hornsey or Coppermills. When a surplus of water is available, treated water from Coppermills is injected back into the aquifer for storage as part of the North London Artificial Recharge Scheme.

The former route of the New River between Stoke Newington and its terminus at New River Head can be seen in gaps in the urban fabric along Petherton Road (Petherton Green), through Canonbury and along Astey's Row (New River Walk) and along Colebrooke Row/Duncan Terrace (Colebrooke Row Gardens and Duncan Terrace Gardens).

== Dame Alice Owen's School bombing ==
On 15 October 1940, approximately 150 people were sheltering in the basement of Dame Alice Owen's School, then situated on Goswell Road. A large parachute mine hit the building directly, causing the structure to collapse and blocking access to the basement. The blast wave from the bomb caused the pipeline carrying the New River to rupture, flooding the shelter and killing the majority of the people taking cover.

A memorial to the victims of the bombing stands in Owen's Fields at the northern end of Goswell Road.

== Drownings and accidents ==
Charles Lamb wrote an essay about a friend he calls G. D. (probably the blind poet George Dyer) who walked into the New River by accident but was rescued. From "Amicus Redivivus" in Essays of Elia:

I do not know when I have experienced a stranger sensation, than on seeing my old friend G.D., who had been paying me a morning visit a few Sundays back, at my cottage at Islington, upon taking leave, instead of turning down the right hand path by which he had entered—with staff in hand, and at noon day, deliberately march right forwards into the midst of the stream that runs by us, and totally disappear. A spectacle like this at dusk would have been appalling enough; but, in the broad open daylight, to witness such an unreserved motion towards self-destruction in a valued friend, took from me all power of speculation. […]

Waters of Sir Hugh Middleton—what a spark you were like to have extinguished for ever! Your salubrious streams to this City, for now near two centuries, would hardly have atoned for what you were in a moment washing away. Mockery of a river—liquid artifice—wretched conduit! henceforth rank with canals, and sluggish aqueducts. Was it for this, that, smit in boyhood with the explorations of that Abyssinian traveller, I paced the vales of Amwell to explore your tributary springs, to trace your salutary waters sparkling through green Hertfordshire, and cultured Enfield parks?—Ye have no swans—no Naiads—no river God—or did the benevolent hoary aspect of my friend tempt ye to suck him in, that ye also might have the tutelary genius of your waters?

Had he been drowned in Cam there would have been some consonancy in it; but what willows had ye to wave and rustle over his moist sepulture?—or, having no name, besides that unmeaning assumption of eternal novity, did ye think to get one by the noble prize, and henceforth to be termed the STREAM DYERIAN?

Rochemont Barbauld, minister of the nearby Newington Green Unitarian Church and husband of Anna Laetitia Barbauld, went violently insane, attacked his wife, and committed suicide by drowning himself in the New River in 1808.

== See also ==
- Canals of the United Kingdom
- History of the British canal system
- Robert Mylne Chief Engineer, 1769–1810
- William Chadwell Mylne Chief Engineer, 1810–1861
- London water supply infrastructure
