= William Chadwell Mylne =

English civil engineer and architect

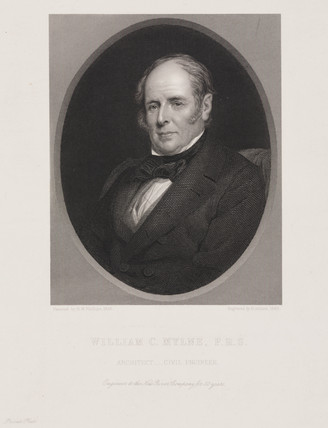
- Born: 6 April 1781; London, England
- Died: 25 December 1863 (aged 82); Great Amwell, Hertfordshire, England

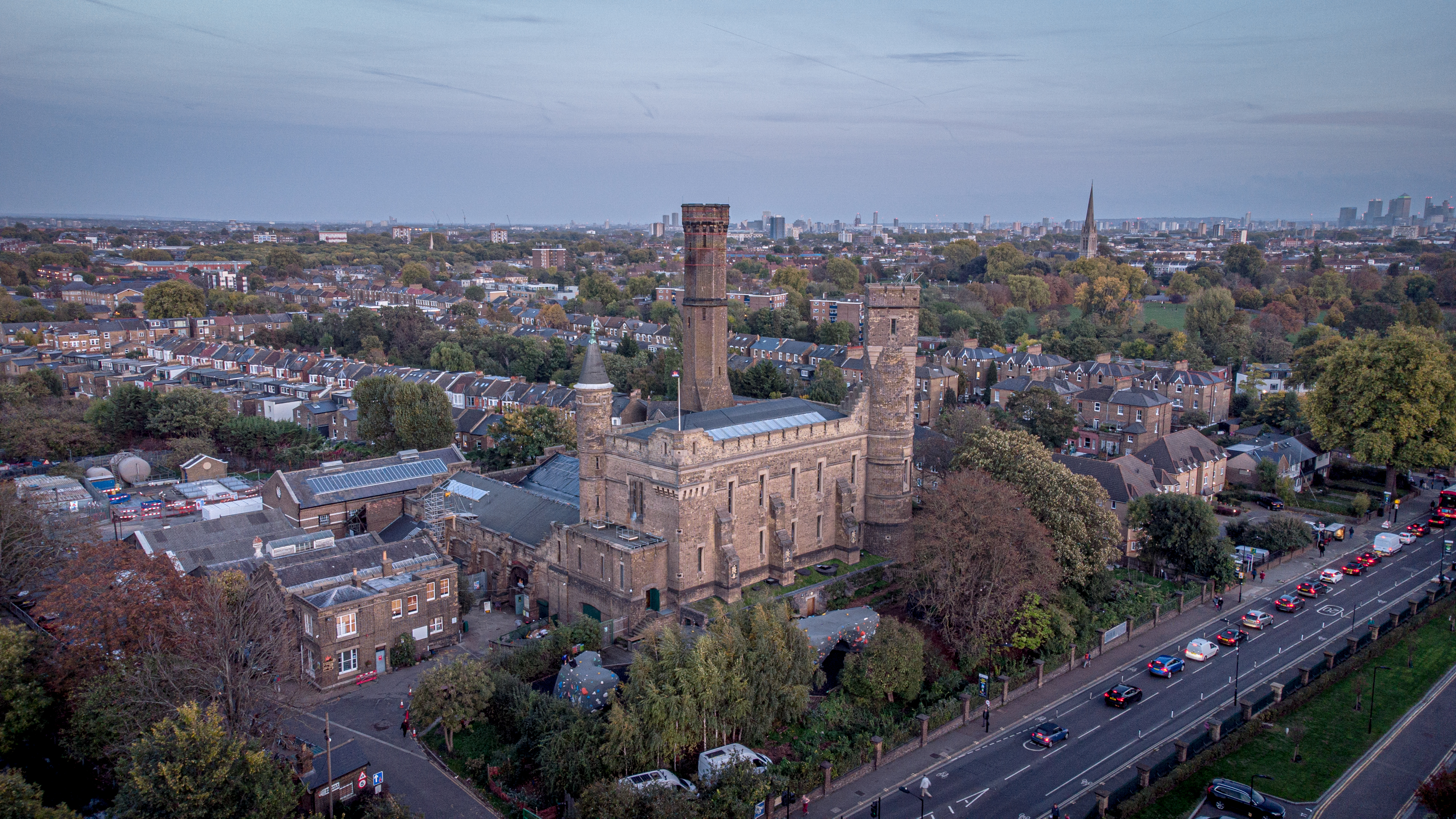
Stoke Newington Pumping Station, designed by Mylne for the New River Company, in the Scottish baronial style

William Chadwell Mylne, FRS (6 April 1781 – 25 December 1863) was an English civil engineer and architect. He was descended from a Scottish family of masons and architects, and was the second son of Robert Mylne (1733–1811), surveyor to the New River Company, and builder of the first Blackfriars Bridge in London.

== Career ==
Initially, William's elder brother Robert was intended to take over his father's business, but when Robert opted for a military career, William began to assist his father, surveying land for the Eau Brink Cut, on the River Great Ouse, in 1797. He also undertook work on the Gloucester and Berkeley Canal.

In 1804, Mylne was employed by the New River Company as assistant to his father, and upon his father's retirement in November 1810, he became chief engineer of the company, a post he held until 1861. From 1819 he was engaged in laying out residential streets on the New River Company's property at New River Head in Clerkenwell, including Myddelton Square, Amwell Street, Inglebert Street, and River Street. Mylne later designed the Gothic Revival St Mark's Church, Myddelton Square (1826–1828), and Clerkenwell Parochial Charity Schools (1828).

Mylne designed several bridges, including the iron Garret Hostel Bridge in Cambridge (1835–1837, demolished 1960), and repairs to the Caversham Bridge in Reading (1815). He also entered the 1827 competition to design Clifton Bridge in Bristol. Other architectural works include a card room at Stationers' Hall, London, Harpole Rectory in Northamptonshire (1826), and his own home, Flint House, Great Amwell (1842–1844).

Mylne was elected a Fellow of the Royal Society in 1826. He was a member of the Smeatonian Society of Civil Engineers from 1811, serving as treasurer from 1822 until his death, and as president in 1842 and 1859. He joined the Institute of British Architects on its foundation in 1834, and the Institution of Civil Engineers in 1842.

He gave evidence to Edwin Chadwick's Health of Towns reports of 1844–1845.

== Personal life ==
Mylne married Mary Smith, the daughter of George Coxhead, and had three sons and three daughters. One son, Robert William Mylne, FRS (1817–1890) also became an architect and geologist.

He died in Great Amwell.

== Bibliography ==
- Colvin, Howard (1995) A Biographical Dictionary of British Architects, 1600-1840 3rd edition. Yale University Press. ISBN 978-0-300-06091-1
- Ward, Robert (2007) The Man Who Buried Nelson: The Surprising Life of Robert Mylne. London: Tempus Publishing. ISBN 978-0-7524-3922-8
- Watson, Garth (1989) The Smeatonians: The Society of Civil Engineers. Thomas Telford. ISBN 978-0-7277-1526-5
