= New River Head =

Historic site in Clerkenwell, England

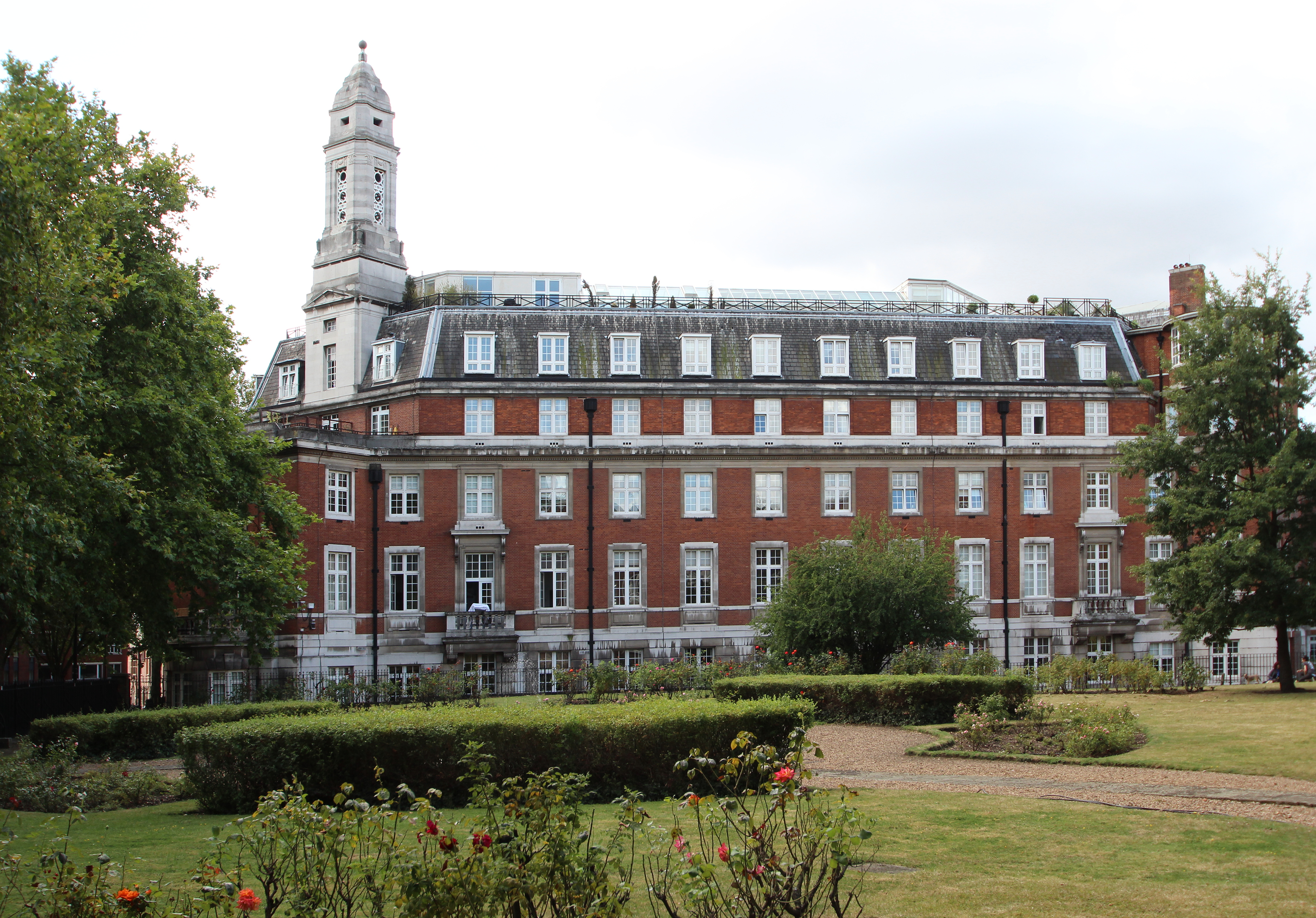
- Former Water Board offices and gardens

- Location within Greater London Location within London Borough of Islington
- 51°31′42.298″N 0°6′27.572″W
- Location: Clerkenwell, London Borough of Islington, London, United Kingdom

New River Head is a historic site located adjacent to Sadler's Wells Theatre on Rosebery Avenue and Amwell Street in the Clerkenwell area of London, England. Originally it was the London terminus of the New River, an artificial watercourse opened in 1613 to supply water to London. Subsequently the site also became the headquarters for the New River Company, the owners of the New River, and for its successors, the Metropolitan Water Board, the Thames Water Authority and Thames Water plc.

Following relocation of most of the operational and administrative functions of the site, it is now largely a residential estate, with apartments in a mixture of repurposed existing and new buildings surrounding a private garden area on the site of the old filter beds. An enclosed half-acre area of the site comprises the remains of an 18th-century windmill and a 19th-century engine house and coal stores: these buildings have been restored by arts charity Quentin Blake Centre for Illustration as part of a £14mn capital campaign to create a public arts centre that is now open, with exhibitions, an airconditione child-friendly library, and an open-air cafe.

There is public access to a view-point over the gardens. At the rear of the building (not open to the public) there is the remains of the medieval conduit-head of the water supply of the London Greyfriars, discovered in Bloomsbury in 1911 and re-erected here in 1927.

The former head office building is a Grade II* listed building. The former laboratory building, remains of the Round Pond, Greyfriars conduit head, former engine house, former coal stores and former windmill are all grade II listed buildings.

== History ==
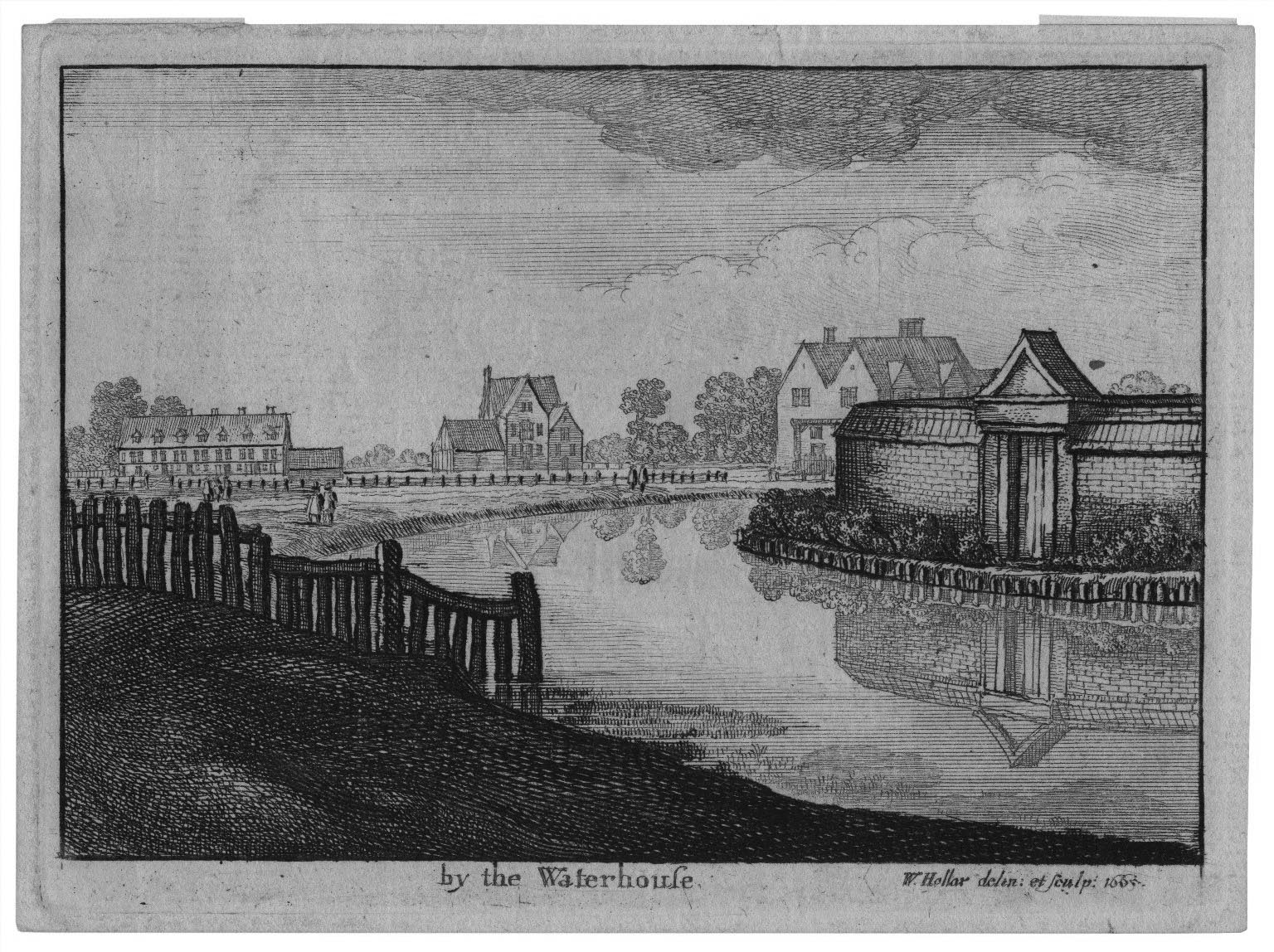
New River Head in 1665

Before the Dissolution of the Monasteries, the site was owned by the Knights of St John of Jerusalem and was known as the Commandery Mantles. It was subsequently passed to Thomas Howard, 4th Duke of Norfolk, and eventually to Samuel Backhouse who, along with his son John, was one of the original "adventurers" (shareholders) of the New River Company. The Commandery Mantles was 80 feet (24 m) above the Thames to the north of the City of London, and an ideal place for a reservoir to supply water to the City.

At New River Head, a circular reservoir known as the Round Pond collected the water. From here it was fed into a network of wooden mains which conveyed water to the cisterns of London. Besides the Round Pond was a single building, known as the Water House. From these beginnings a larger complex gradually developed, with further ponds and buildings covering an area of some 7 acres (2.8 ha) and bounded by what were to become the streets of Rosebery Avenue, Hardwick Street, Amwell Street and Myddelton Passage.

In 1708, a new Upper Pond was constructed on higher ground where Claremont Square lies today, in order to give a better head of pressure to serve more distant areas around the West End of London. Initially water was pumped to this from the Round Pond by windmill and horse gin, but in 1768 a steam engine designed by John Smeaton was brought into use. In 1785, a Boulton & Watt engine was added, and over the years replacement engines were installed. These were all housed in the Engine House, on the north-west of the site. In 1820, the New River Company moved its offices, which until then had been located in the City of London, into an enlarged Water House at New River Head, beginning an association of the site with the administration of London's water supply that was to last some 170 years.

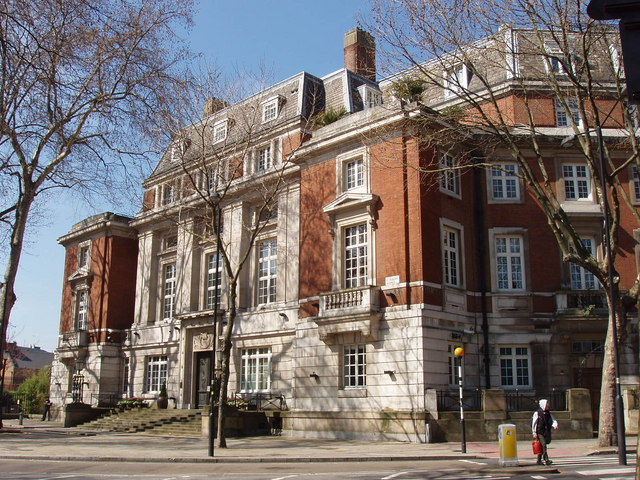
Frontage of the water board offices

Between 1915 and 1920, the Metropolitan Water Board, as successor to the New River Company, constructed a substantial new head office building on the Rosebery Avenue side of the site and across the, by now redundant, Round Pond. This building incorporated a reconstruction of the historical late seventeenth-century Oak Room from the Water House, which was also demolished as part of the same development. Between 1936 and 1938, the water board added a new water testing laboratory to the site. In 1946, the London end of the New River was truncated to Stoke Newington with the water being fed into the East Reservoir there, thus removing the operational usage of the site. However the head office and laboratory buildings continued in use by the Metropolitan Water Board and its successor, the Thames Water Authority.

In 1964–6, the Charles Allen House, a seven-storey block of staff flats, was added to the north-west corner of the site. Following the privatisation of the Thames Water Authority in 1989, the head office of Thames Water plc was relocated to Reading, along with the laboratory facilities. However in the same timescales an operational function returned to the site, with the creation of a shaft and pumping station for the London Water Ring Main on the Amwell Street side of the site.

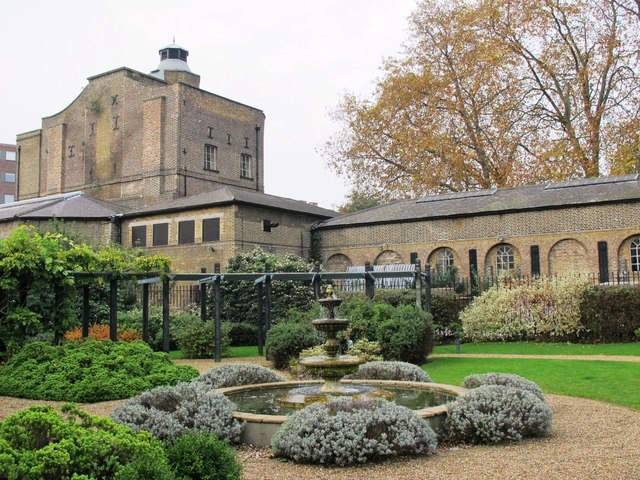
New River Head garden, engine house and coal stores

Following the relocation of Thames Water, the head office building and laboratory buildings were converted to apartments, as was the Remus building, a former water meter testing building dating from 1922-4. The Oak Room still remains within the former office building. Two new apartments blocks, the Nautilus building and the Hydra building were added.

Some of the site's industrial buildings still exist: the windmill base, engine house and associated coal stores and ancillary stores. In July 2020 it was announced that this part of the site would become the new home for arts charity Quentin Blake Centre for Illustration. It is now to the public, with exhibition galleries, education studios, events space, a shop and a café.
