= New River Company =

Water company in London, 1619–1904

- Type: Joint-stock company
- Industry: Water supply, Property
- Founded: June 21, 1619 in London, England
- Founder: Hugh Myddelton
- Defunct: July 25, 1904
- Fate: Municipalised
- Successors: Metropolitan Water Board; The New River Company Limited
- Headquarters: New River Head
- Area served: North and Central London

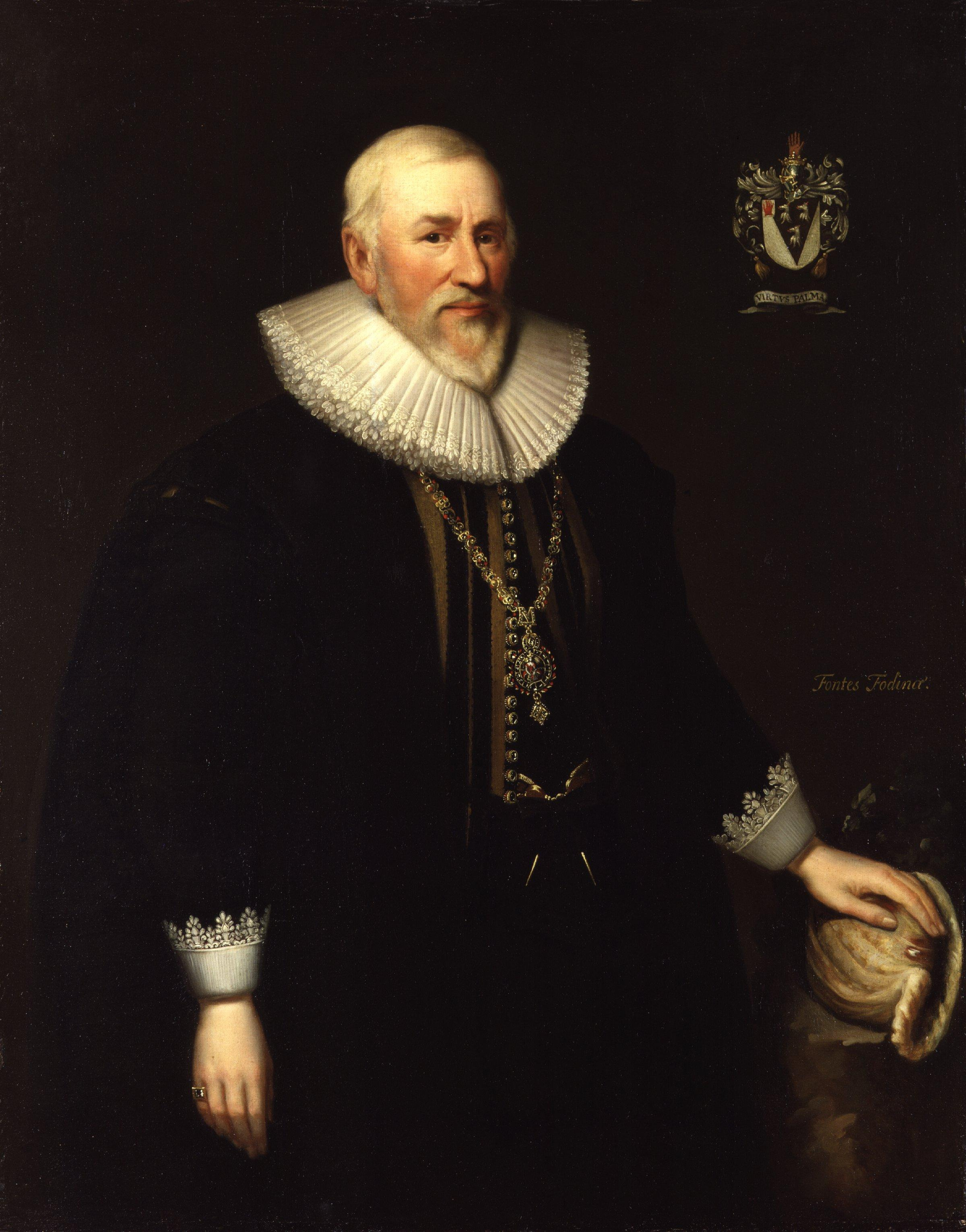
Sir Hugh Myddelton, founder of the New River Company

The New River Company, formally The Governor and Company of the New River brought from Chadwell and Amwell to London, was a privately owned water supply company in London, England, originally formed around 1609 and incorporated in 1619 by royal charter. Founded by Hugh Myddelton with the involvement of King James I, it was one of the first joint-stock utility companies, and paved the way for large-scale private investment in London's water infrastructure in the centuries which followed.

The New River Company was formed to manage the New River, a 42-mile (68 km) artificial aqueduct which had been completed a few years earlier by Myddelton, with the backing of the King and the City, to supply fresh water to London. During its history, the company maintained a large network of pipes to distribute water around much of North London, collecting rates from water users.

The company's headquarters were at New River Head in Clerkenwell, Islington, and the company became a significant landowner in the surrounding area, laying out streets which take their name from people and places associated with the company, including Amwell Street, River Street, Mylne Street, Chadwell Street and Myddelton Square.

The company was finally dissolved in 1904 when London's water supply was taken into municipal ownership, and its assets were acquired by the newly formed Metropolitan Water Board.

== Background ==
Although London's water supply infrastructure dates back at least to the construction of the Great Conduit in 1247, by the early 17th century water was still scarce, and most Londoners relied on pumps or water carriers which supplied increasingly polluted water. The City of London had funded several early water works in the 16th century, which supplemented the conduit system by drawing water from the tidal Thames, but these were small operations, and London's population continued to grow.

== Construction of the New River ==
New River Act 1605
- Act of Parliament
- Parliament of England
- Long title: An Acte for the bringing in of a freshe Streame of running Water to the Northe parts of the City of London.
- Citation: 3 Jas. 1. c. 18
- Territorial extent: England and Wales

Dates
- Royal assent: 27 May 1606
- Commencement: 6 January 1606 (Note: Start of session.)
Other legislation
Amended by	New River Act 1606
Relates to	Thames Commission of Sewers Act 1605

Status: Current legislation

Text of statute as originally enacted

New River Act 1606
- Act of Parliament
- Parliament of England
- Long title: An Act for explanation a statute made the third year of the reign of King James, intituled, "An Act for the bringing in of a fresh stream of running water to the north parts of the city of London."
- Citation: 4 Jas. 1. c. 12
- Territorial extent: England and Wales

Dates
- Royal assent: 4 July 1607
- Commencement: 18 November 1606
Other legislation
Amends	New River Act 1605

Status: Current legislation

Text of statute as originally enacted

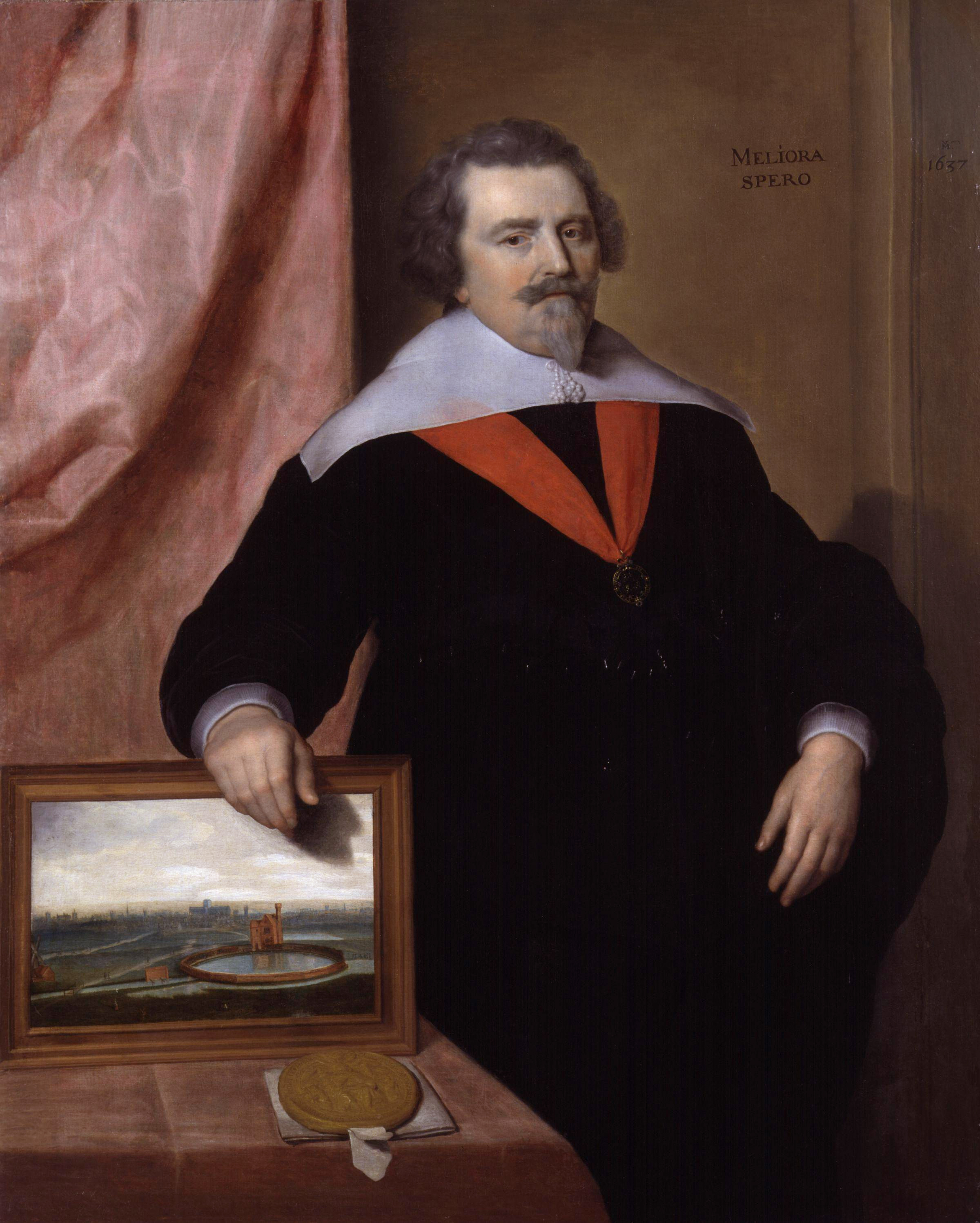
Sir John Backhouse, a founding member of the New River Company. The Round Pond, the company's first reservoir, can be seen in the painting he rests his hand on.

Edmund Colthurst originally conceived a scheme to build an artificial waterway from springs near Ware in Hertfordshire to supply water to London. In 1604 he was granted a patent from King James I to construct the New River. By early 1605, after Colthurst had dug 3 miles (4.8 km) of channel, the City intervened, and began the process of obtaining an act of Parliament despite Colthurst's protests. In 1605, an act of Parliament, the New River Act 1605 (3 Jas. 1. c. 18) was passed, granting the City the power to construct the New River, but without making any provision for funding, or providing any powers of compulsory purchase. (Note: New River Act 1605 (3 Jas. 1. c. 18) An Acte for the bringing in of a fresh Streame of running water to the North parts of the Citie of London)

A second act, the New River Act 1606 (4 Jas. 1. c. 12) was passed the following year, making further provisions about the construction of the New River. (Note: New River Act 1606 (4 Jas. 1. c. 12) An Act for explanation of the Statute made in the third yeere of the reigne of King James, Intituled An Act for bginging of a fresh Streame of running water to the North parts of the Cittie of London) In 1609, Hugh Myddelton agreed to construct and fund the project. As the New River was unincorporated, the agreement was phrased in terms of property law, with investors owning a share of freehold in the whole project.

By early 1610, the project had stalled after around 10 miles (16 km), with some landowners refusing to allow the New River to be built over their land, and members of the public concerned about a public utility being privately held. A bill was put before Parliament to abolish the project, but before this could be considered, the Blessed Parliament was dissolved, and Parliament was not to productively meet again until 1621.

Once Parliament was dissolved, Myddelton obtained permission from the City to extend the works for five more years, although the objections to the project still remained. On 2 May 1612, Myddelton reached an agreement with King James I, where the king (who was trying to become less financially dependent on Parliament at the time) committed to funding half of the project in return for a share of the profits, and promised his support. The king's support was crucial in convincing the remaining landowners to allow the New River over their property.

By this point, Myddelton was short of money, and needed a way to raise more funds for his half of the project. He split his holding of the New River into 36 parts; the modern concept of a share had not yet fully formed, and the New River shares were a novel concept which could not promise a return of capital, more akin to "tenants in common" in property law. These shares were sold to "adventurers" (shareholders), the first of whom was Henry Neville. Four shares, without any liability for capital calls, were given to Colthurst for the "greate labour and endeavour by him bestowed about the said worke".

The New River was officially opened on Michaelmas Day 1613, with a celebration at New River Head, after £18,524 16s had been spent on the project, but the New River Company's investment continued as they laid wooden pipes made of elm throughout the city to distribute the water. The king wrote to the City to encourage them to increase uptake of the New River water, as he was becoming anxious about the return on his investment.

== Incorporation ==
The New River Company was incorporated by royal charter on 21 June 1619 with Myddelton as governor. However, the charter left a number of aspects unclear: it effectively granted a monopoly on water supply in London, and the City had conferred their water supply rights to Myddelton personally, which had never been transferred. These legal ambiguities would take many years to be resolved.

By the time of incorporation, the company had over 1,000 customers, and the water provided by the springs was becoming insufficient. In 1620, the company decided to divert water from the nearby River Lea into the New River, although this was not permitted by either the statutes or the company's charter, and caused complaints from bargemen and the public in the area until this arrangement was eventually approved by Parliament in the River Lee Navigation Act 1738 (12 Geo. 2. c. 32). (Note: River Lee Navigation Act 1738 (12 Geo. 2. c. 32) Improving the Navigation of the River Lee from Hertford to Ware.)

== The Crown Clog ==
In 1631, King Charles I, who was unhappy with the returns made by the king's share of the company, negotiated an agreement where Myddelton would buy the share back, in return for a lump sum of £500 and an annual payment of £500 in perpetuity. This became known as the Crown Clog.

The king's share was divided into 36 parts to match the adventurers' shares, and although the Crown Clog was originally paid by Myddelton personally, it subsequently came to be attached to 29 of the king's shares and two of the adventurers' shares. The king's shares also did not confer the right to appoint a director to the board, so these shares traded at a discount to the adventurers' shares.

== Property ==
The New River Company originally owned 50 acres (20 ha) of land around New River Head to allow for the many wooden water mains running outward from there. With the advent of iron pipes around 1811, the company was able to run larger water mains underground, taking care to run them in a pattern where streets could be laid out above. As the district of Clerkenwell grew up in the area, the New River Company started making significant income from leasing land, as well as supplying water. Many of the streets in the area still bear the names given to them by the New River Company, and the company's chief engineer, William Chadwell Mylne, was the architect of the local church, St Mark's.

== Public ownership ==
In 1904, the water supply business of the New River Company was taken into public ownership under the provisions of the Metropolis Water Act 1902, and transferred to the Metropolitan Water Board. A total of £6,000,534 was paid to the shareholders and directors in compensation, which was paid in "water stock", paying a 3% annual dividend. Through municipalization the New River Company became a direct ancestor of the current Thames Water company, the main water supplier to London today.

Over the 292 years since Myddelton divided his holding in the New River Company into shares, and taking the purchase price into account, the annual yield on an original New River share has been calculated at over 267%.

After municipalization, the Crown Clog came to be paid by the water board, which paid it until 1956 when it was bought out for £8,230. Had the Crown retained the king's share for the lifetime of the New River Company, it would have made fifty times more than the Clog paid.

New River Company Act 1904
- Act of Parliament
- Parliament of the United Kingdom
- Long title: An Act to make provision for the application and distribution of the water stock issued to the New River Company in discharge of the sum payable as compensation for the transfer of their water undertaking to the Metropolitan Water Board for the reconstruction of the Company and its registration as a limited company and for other purposes.
- Citation: 4 Edw. 7. c. xlviii

Dates
- Royal assent: 24 June 1904

Text of statute as originally enacted

The company's unrelated property holdings were transferred by the New River Company Act 1904 (4 Edw. 7. c. xlviii) to a new company, the New River Company Limited, which survives today as a subsidiary of Derwent London.
