= Clerkenwell =

Area of central London, England

Coordinates: 51.52604°N 0.103475°W

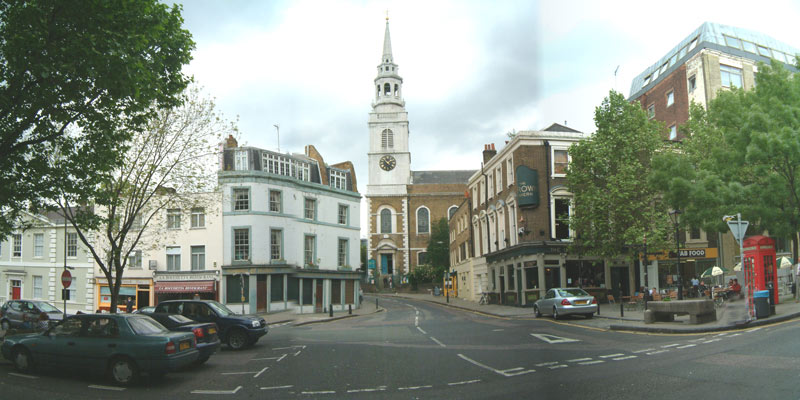
- Clerkenwell Green and St James's Church

- Location within Greater London
- Population: 11,490 (2011 Census. Ward)
- OS grid reference: TQ315825
- London borough: Islington; Camden
- Ceremonial county: Greater London
- Region: London
- Country: England
- Sovereign state: United Kingdom
- Post town: LONDON
- Postcode district: EC1
- Postcode district: WC1
- Dialling code: 020
- Police: Metropolitan
- Fire: London
- Ambulance: London
- UK Parliament: Islington South and Finsbury; Holborn and St Pancras
- London Assembly: North East; Barnet and Camden

Clerkenwell (/ˈklɑːrkənwɛl/ KLAHRK-ən-well) is an area of central London, England.

Clerkenwell was an ancient parish from the medieval period onwards, and now forms the south-western part of the London Borough of Islington. The church of St James in Clerkenwell Close and nearby Clerkenwell Green sit at the centre of Clerkenwell. Located on the edge of the City of London, it was the home of the Priory of St John and the site of a number of wells and spas, including Sadlers Wells and Spa Green. The well after which the area was named was rediscovered in 1924.

The Marquess of Northampton owned much of the land in Clerkenwell, reflected in placenames such as Northampton Square, Spencer Street and Compton Street.

The watchmaking and watch repairing trades were once of great importance, particularly in the area around Northampton Square. In the 20th century, Clerkenwell became known as a centre for architecture and design.

Clerkenwell is home to UL's/City St George's University and the Royal Mail's Mount Pleasant sorting office. It includes the neighbourhoods of Farringdon and Exmouth Market.

== Geography ==
Goswell Street formed the eastern boundary of the Clerkenwell parishes, with the River Fleet, now buried beneath Farringdon Road and other streets, forming the western boundary with Holborn and, in part, St Pancras. This western boundary with both neighbouring areas is now used as part of the London Borough of Islington's western boundary with the London Borough of Camden.

Pentonville is a part of northern Clerkenwell, while the southern part is sometimes referred to as Farringdon, after the railway station of that name – which was named after Farringdon Road (an extension of Farringdon Street) and originally named Farringdon Street Station.

Finsbury Town Hall and the Finsbury Estate lie in Clerkenwell, rather than Finsbury. They are named after the former Metropolitan Borough of Finsbury which included Clerkenwell, Finsbury and other areas.

== History ==
=== Clerks' Well ===
Clerkenwell took its name from the Clerks' Well in Farringdon Lane (clerken was the Middle English genitive plural of clerk, a variant of clerc, meaning literate person or clergyman). The first surviving reference to the name is from 1100. In the Middle Ages, the London Parish clerks performed annual mystery plays there, based on biblical themes. Part of the well remains visible, incorporated into a 1980s building called Well Court. It is visible through a window of that building on Farringdon Lane. Access to the well is managed by Islington Local History Centre and visits can be arranged by appointment. The well and the chamber in which it is located are a Grade I listed building.

=== Monastic traditions ===
The monastic Order of the Knights Hospitallers of St John of Jerusalem had its English headquarters at the Priory of Clerkenwell. (The Blessed Gerard founded the order to provide medical assistance during the crusades.) St John's Gate (built by Sir Thomas Docwra in 1504) survives in the rebuilt form of the Priory Gate. Its gateway, erected in 1504 in St John's Square, served various purposes after the Dissolution of the Monasteries. For example, it was the birthplace of the Gentleman's Magazine in 1731, and the scene of Dr Johnson's work in connection with that journal. In modern times the gatehouse again became associated with the order and was in the early 20th century the headquarters of the St John Ambulance Association. An Early English crypt remains beneath the chapel of the order, which was otherwise mostly rebuilt in the 1950s after wartime bombing. The notorious deception of the "Cock Lane Ghost", in which Johnson took great interest, was perpetrated nearby.

Adjoining the priory was St Mary's nunnery of the Benedictine order, now entirely disappeared, and St James's Church, rebuilt in 1792 on the site of the original church which was partly of Norman provenance. The Charterhouse, near the boundary with the City of London, was originally a Carthusian monastery. Following the Dissolution of the Monasteries the Charterhouse became a private mansion and one owner, Thomas Sutton, subsequently left it with an endowment as a school and almshouse. The almshouse remains but the school relocated to Surrey and its part of the site is now a campus of Barts and The London School of Medicine and Dentistry.

=== Black Mary's Hole ===
Black Mary’s Hole was a locality and small rural settlement in a low-lying area on the eastern, Clerkenwell side of the valley of the River Fleet. The area included fields called Black Mary’s Hole, and Robin Hood’s Field, which together with the name of the former local pub, The Fox at Bay, seem to reflect the lawlessness of the area. The locality was also known as a meeting place for gay men.

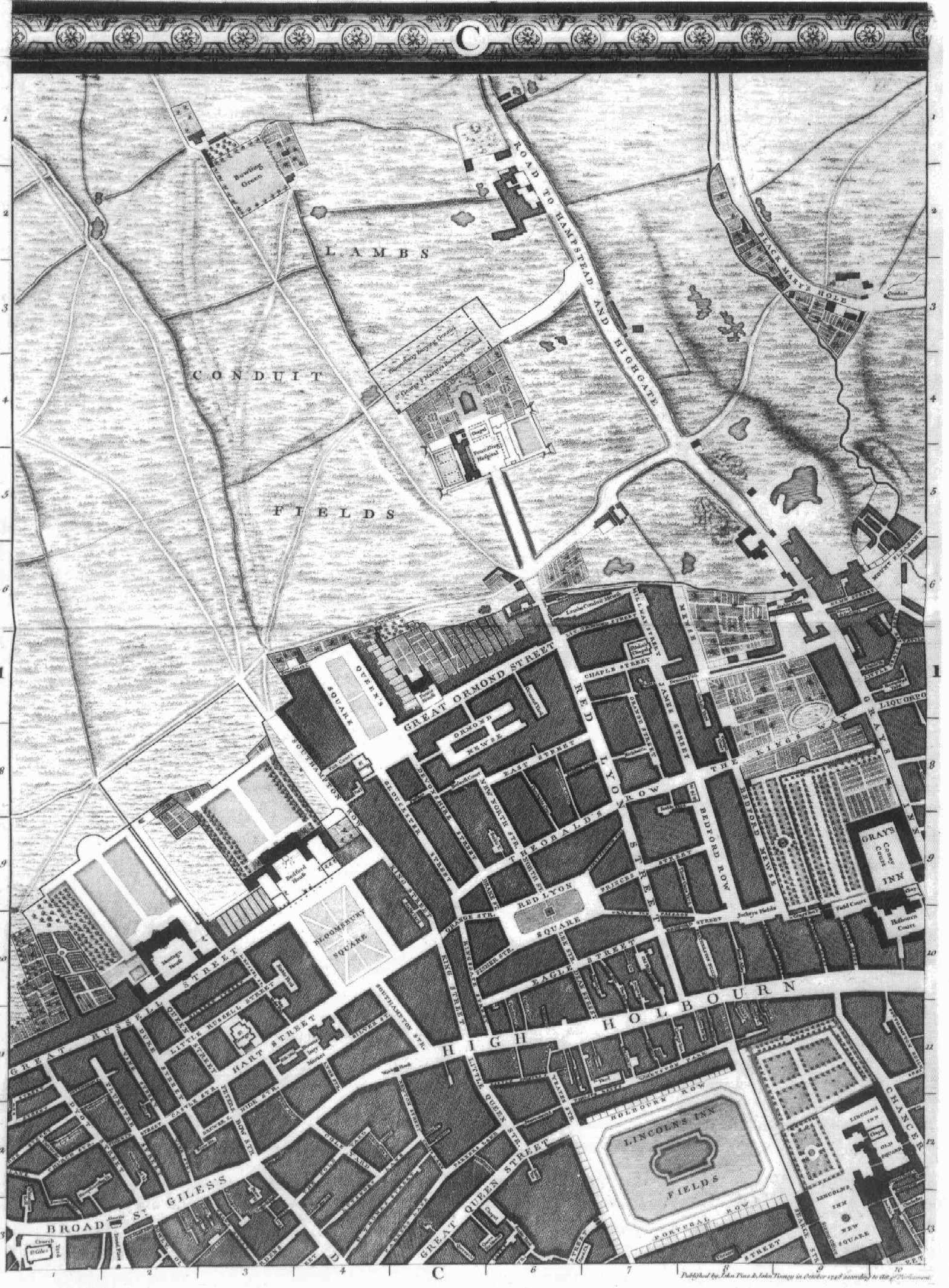
Black Mary's Hole in 1746, located on the eastern side of the River Fleet.

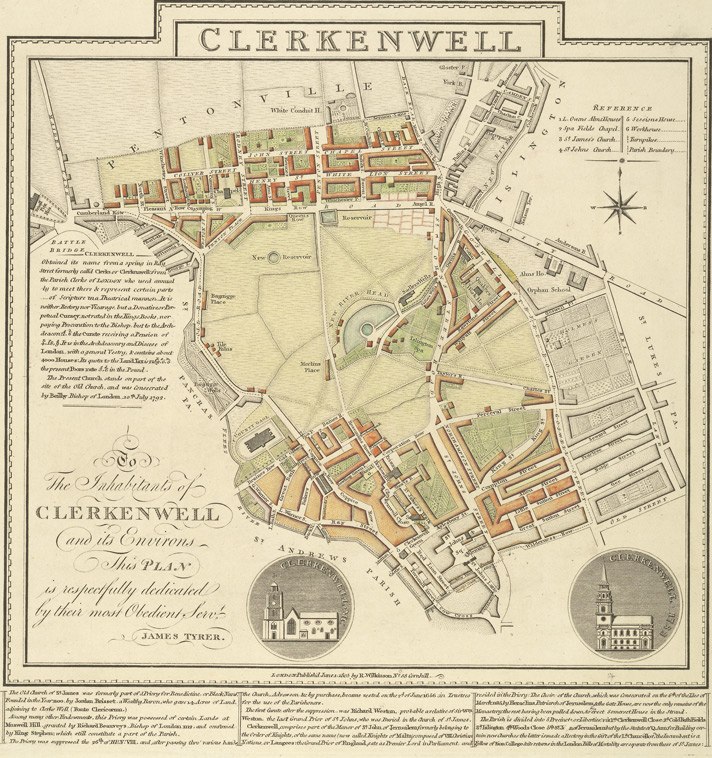
The parishes of Clerkenwell, 1805

=== New River Head ===
The construction of the New River between 1604 and 1613 resulted in the creation of the New River Head in Clerkenwell, on what is now Rosebery Avenue. The New River was constructed to supply London with fresh drinking water from Hertfordshire, and the New River Head originally consisted of a circular reservoir, the Round Pond and an associated building, the Water House. From here water was fed into a network of wooden mains which conveyed water to the cisterns of London.

Over the years the New River Head complex expanded with the addition of further reservoirs and pumping stations, driven by windmill, horse gin and, eventually, steam engine. In 1820, the New River Company, owners of the river, moved its offices into an enlarged Water House, beginning an association of the site with the administration of London's water supply that was to last some 170 years. In 1920, the Metropolitan Water Board opened a new office building at New River Head, and this remained the headquarters for London's water supply up to the privatisation of the Thames Water Authority in 1989. The site is now largely in residential use, including both converted buildings and newly built apartment blocks.

=== New River Estate ===
From 1810 to 1850, the New River Company developed housing on the land surrounding New River Head. At the centre is Myddelton Square, named after Sir Hugh Myddelton, developer of the New River, with the Grade II listed St Mark's Church in the centre. The church was built in 1827 in Victorian Gothic style by William Chadwell Mylne, after whom the nearby Mylne Street and Chadwell Street are named. The estate is a series of streets and terraces in neo-Classical, Greek revival style. The place names reference the New River company, including Amwell Street (after the New River's source in Hertfordshire) and River Street.

=== Lloyd Baker Estate ===
The Lloyd Baker estate was laid out immediately to the west of the New River estate from 1820 to 1840. It takes its name from the family of Bishop William Lloyd who inherited the land from his godmother Flower Backhouse, Countess of Clarendon, a shareholder in the New River company. The estate is characterised by neo-classical pedimented villas and garden squares.

=== Notoriety ===
As it was a suburb beyond the confines of the London Wall, Clerkenwell was outside the jurisdiction of the somewhat puritanical City fathers. Consequently, "base tenements and houses of unlawful and disorderly resort" sprang up, with a "great number of dissolute, loose, and insolent people harboured in such and the like noisome and disorderly houses, as namely poor cottages, and habitations of beggars and people without trade, stables, inns, alehouses, taverns, garden-houses converted to dwellings, ordinaries, dicing houses, bowling alleys, and brothel houses".

During the Elizabethan era Clerkenwell contained a notorious brothel quarter. In Shakespeare's Henry IV, Part 2, Falstaff complains about Justice Shallow boasting of "the wildness of his youth, and the feats he has done about Turnbull Street". Known now as Turnmill Street and adjoining Farringdon station, it had an infamous reputation for brothel-keeping and was described in Sugden's Topographical Dictionary as "the most disreputable street in London, a haunt of thieves and loose women". The Clerkenwell Bridewell, a prison and correctional institute for prostitutes and vagrants, was known for savage punishment and endemic sexual corruption.

=== Prisons ===
Clerkenwell was also the location of three prisons: the Clerkenwell Bridewell, Coldbath Fields Prison (later Clerkenwell Gaol) and the New Prison, later the Clerkenwell House of Detention, notorious as the scene of the Clerkenwell Outrage in 1867, an attempted prison break by Fenians who killed many in the tenement houses on Corporation Row in trying to blow a hole in the prison wall. The House of Detention was demolished in 1890 but the extensive vaults and cells beneath, now known as the Clerkenwell Catacombs, remained. They were reopened as air raid shelters during the Blitz, and for a few years were open as a minor tourist attraction. Various film scenes have been shot in the catacombs.

=== Industrial Revolution ===
The Industrial Revolution changed the area greatly. It became a centre for breweries, distilleries and the printing industry. It gained an especial reputation for the making of clocks, marine chronometers and watches, which activity once employed many people from around the area. Flourishing craft workshops still carry on some of the traditional trades, such as jewellery-making. Clerkenwell was home to Witherbys, a printing company who have now split ownership, with the printers having relocated to north London and the publishers to Scotland.

It was during the Industrial Revolution that Clerkenwell became known as London's Italian district, although the total number of Italian residents probably numbered no more than 2,000 at any one time.

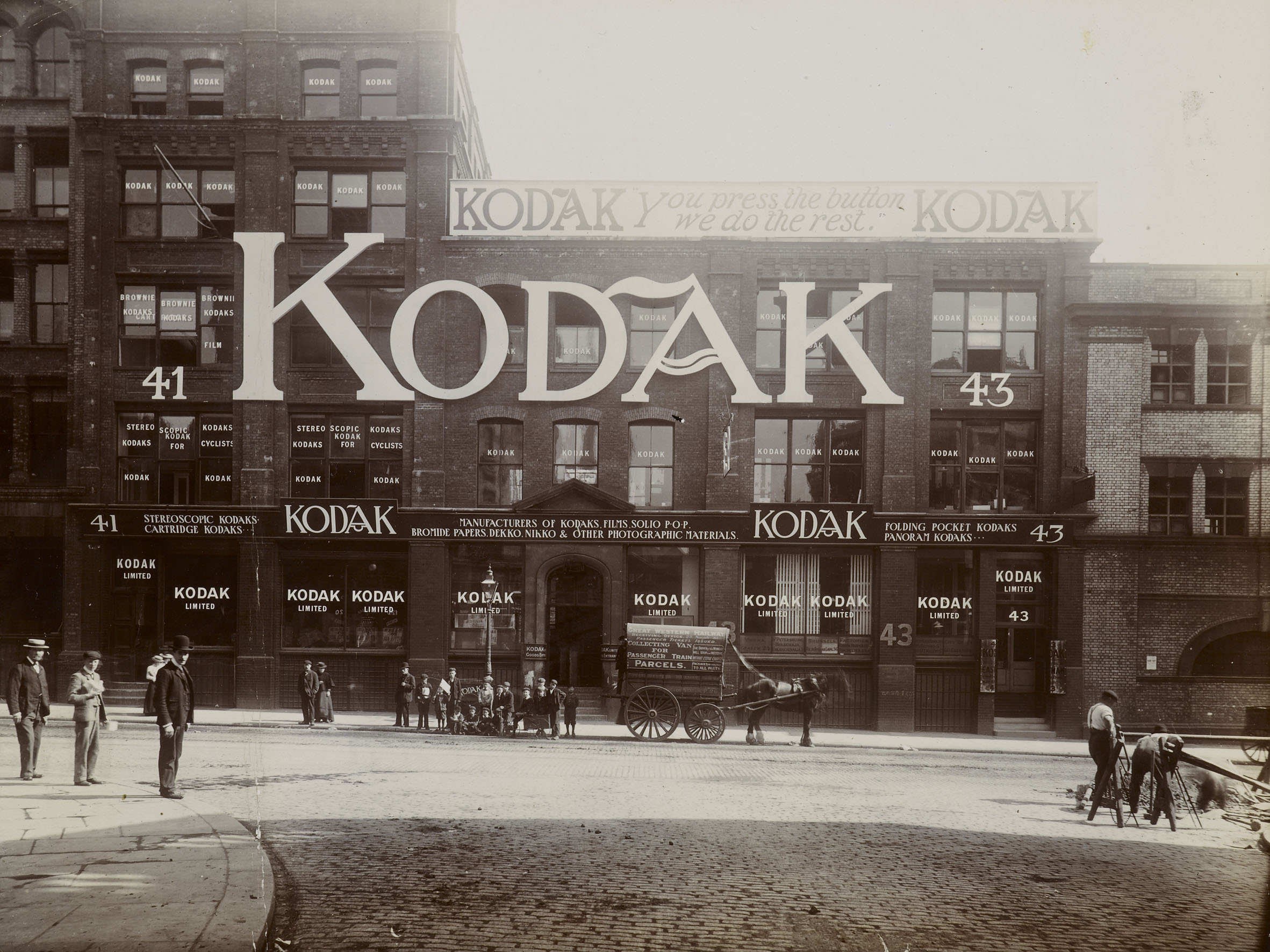
Kodak Building at 41–43 Clerkenwell Rd, London in 1902

The Kodak United Company opened a factory and storefront at 41–43 Clerkenwell and took advantage of the surplus of unemployed jewelers and watchmakers to build their stereoscopic and folding pocket cameras that they produced and repaired. The location also allowed them easy access to the chemicals required for their bromide based papers and negatives. During World War II, they were relocated for security reasons because of the fear that Axis bombs would destroy the photographic equipment used for the war effort.

=== Clerkenwell Green ===
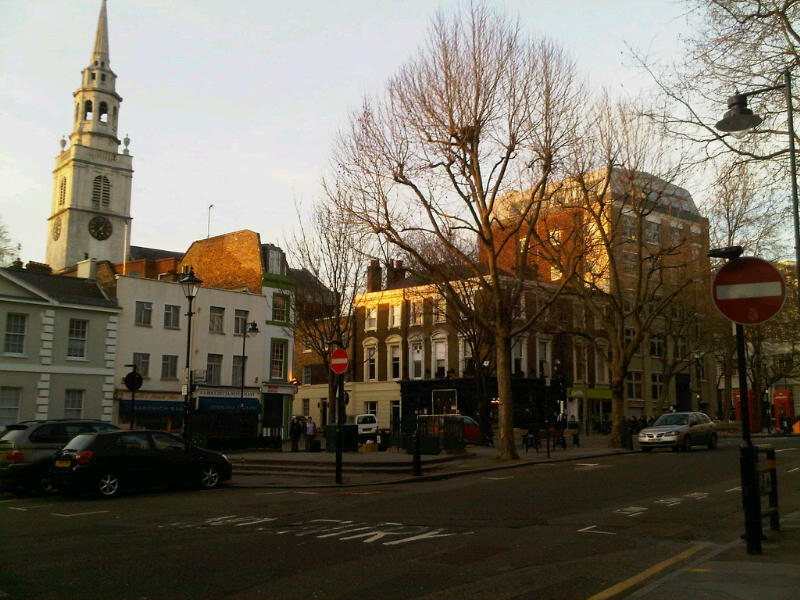
Clerkenwell Green

Clerkenwell Green lies at the centre of the old village, by the church, and has a mixture of housing, offices and pubs, dominated by the imposing former Middlesex Sessions House. It was built in 1782, extended during the Victorian era, and by the early 21st century used as a Masonic hall. The name is something of a historical relic – Clerkenwell Green has had no grass for over 300 years. However, in conveying some impression of its history, it gives the appearance of one of the better-preserved village centres in what is now central London.

In Charles Dickens's Oliver Twist, Clerkenwell Green is where Fagin and the Artful Dodger induct Oliver into pickpocketing amongst shoppers in the busy market once held there. In his words it is "an open square in Clerkenwell, which is yet called, by some perversion of terms the Green", despite lacking any "greenery". Indeed, Dickens knew the area well and was a customer of the Finsbury Savings Bank on Sekforde Street, which links Clerkenwell Green to St John Street.

Hockley-in-the-Hole was an area of Clerkenwell Green where bull-baiting, bear-baiting and similar activities occurred in the 17th and 18th centuries.

=== Radicalism ===
Clerkenwell Green has been associated with radicalism, from the Lollards in the 16th century, the Chartists in the 19th century and communists in the early 20th century. In 1902, Vladimir Lenin moved the publication of the Iskra (Spark) to the British Social Democratic Federation at 37a Clerkenwell Green, and issues 22 to 38 were indeed edited there. At that time Vladimir Lenin resided on Percy Circus, less than half a mile north of Clerkenwell Green. In 1903, the newspaper was moved to Geneva. It is said that Lenin and a young Joseph Stalin met in the Crown and Anchor pub (now The Crown Tavern) when the latter was visiting London in 1903. In the 1920s and 1930s, 37a Clerkenwell Green was a venue for Communist Party meetings, and the Marx Memorial Library was founded on the same site in 1933. In 1942 the local borough council erected a controversial bust of Vladimir Lenin at the site of a new block of flats in Holford Square (the bust was removed in the 1950s).

Clerkenwell's tradition of left-leaning publication continued until late 2008 with The Guardian and The Observer having their headquarters on Farringdon Road, a short walk from the Green. Their new offices are a short distance away in King's Cross. In 2011, an anti-cuts protest march departed from Clerkenwell and ended with a rally at Trafalgar Square demanding trade union rights, human rights and international solidarity.

=== Local government ===
The wards of the Metropolitan Borough of Finsbury, 1952. Clerkenwell forms the western part of this area

Clerkenwell St James was an ancient parish in the Finsbury division of the Ossulstone hundred of Middlesex. Part of the parish of St James was split off as the parish of St John in 1723. However, for civil matters they remained a single parish. The Clerkenwell Vestry became a nominating authority to the Metropolitan Board of Works in 1855.

Under the Metropolis Management Act 1855 any parish that exceeded 2,000 ratepayers was to be divided into wards; as such the parish of St James & St John Clerkenwell was divided into five wards (electing vestrymen): No. 1 (12), No. 2 (15), No. 3 (12), No. 4 (18) and No. 5 (15).

The area of the metropolitan board became the County of London in 1889. A reform of local government in 1900 abolished the Clerkenwell Vestry and the parish became part of the Metropolitan Borough of Finsbury. Alexandra Park, an exclave of the parish, was transferred to Hornsey, Middlesex at the same time. Clerkenwell Town Hall, which had been built on Rosebery Avenue in 1895, became Finsbury Town Hall. On 1 April 1915 the parish was abolished and merged with Finsbury. At the 1911 census (the last before the abolition of the parish), Clerkenwell had a population of 57,121. Finsbury became part of the London Borough of Islington in 1965 and the old town hall lay empty and deteriorating for many years. It has since been sold to the Urdang Dance Academy.

=== Post-war de-industrialisation and revival ===
After the Second World War Clerkenwell suffered from industrial decline and many of the premises occupied by the engineering, printing publishing and meat and food trades (the last mostly around Smithfield) fell empty. Several acclaimed council housing estates were commissioned by Finsbury Borough Council. Modernist architect and Russian émigré Berthold Lubetkin's listed Spa Green Estate, constructed 1943–1950, has recently been restored. The Finsbury Estate, constructed in 1968 to the designs of Joseph Emberton, includes flats, since altered and re-clad.

A general revival and gentrification process began in the 1980s, and the area is now known for loft-living in some of the former industrial buildings. It also has young professionals, nightclubs and restaurants and is home to many professional offices as an overspill for the nearby City of London and West End. Amongst other sectors, there is a notable concentration of design professions around Clerkenwell, and supporting industries such as high-end designer furniture showrooms. It is claimed that the area has the highest concentration of architects and building professionals in the world. Many of London's leading architectural practices have offices in the area.

== Entertainment ==
=== Historic public houses ===
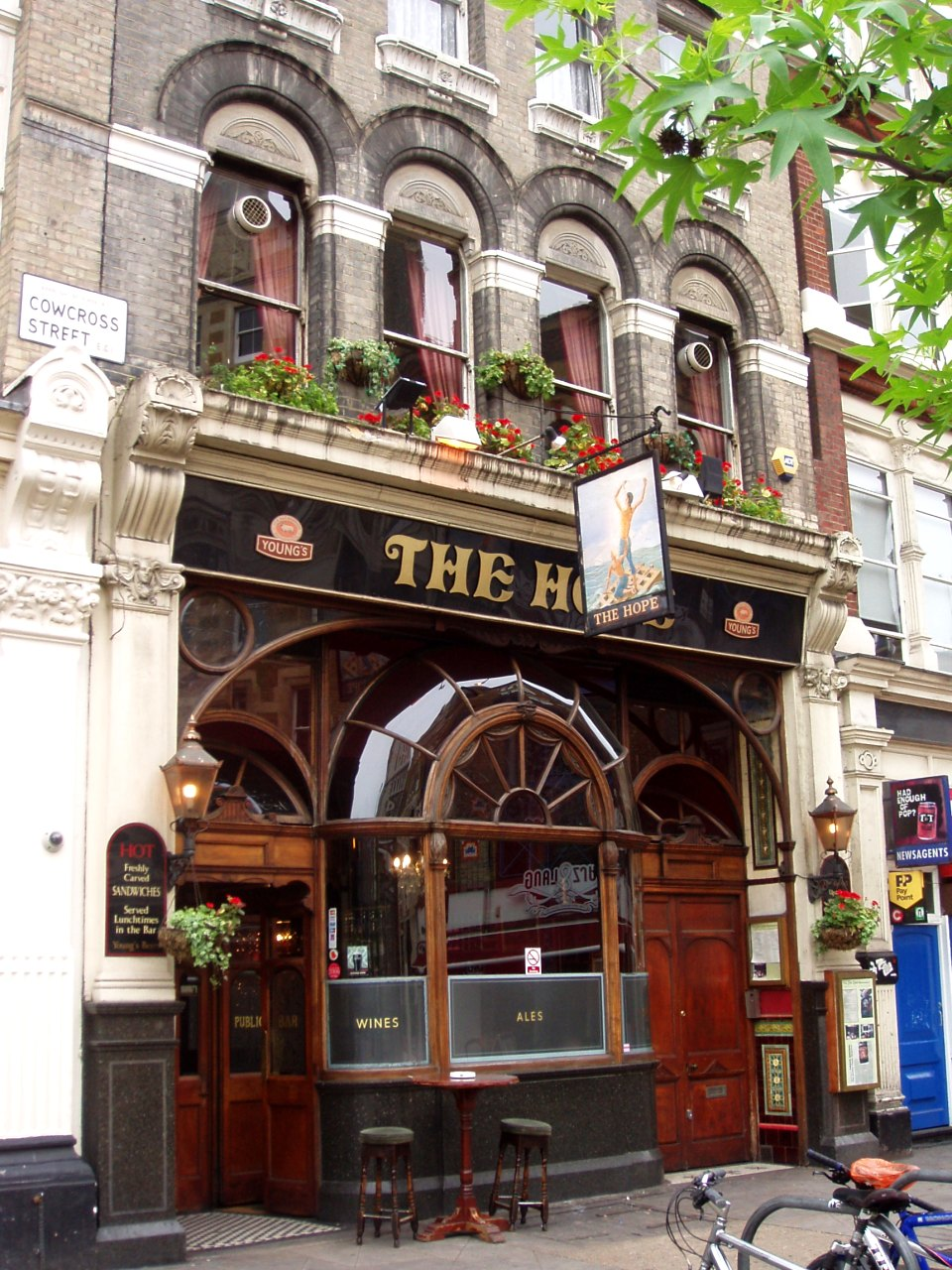
The Hope

It is said that Vladimir Lenin and a young Joseph Stalin first met in the Crown and Anchor pub (now known as the Crown Tavern) on Clerkenwell Green, when the latter was visiting London in 1903.

The Betsey Trotwood (named after Betsey Trotwood in David Copperfield by Charles Dickens) adopted the name in 1983, having previously been the Butcher's Arms.

=== Restaurants ===
In 2005 Mark Bittman of The New York Times wrote that Clerkenwell has "some of the best restaurants in London". Restaurants in Clerkenwell include St John and the Michelin-starred Club Gascon.

== London's Little Italy ==
In the 1850s the south-western part of Clerkenwell and Saffron Hill in the nearby borough of Holborn became known as London's "Little Italy" because around 2,000 Italians had settled in the area. The community had mostly dispersed by the 1960s, but the area remains the 'spiritual home' of London's Italians, and is a focal point for more recent Italian immigrants, largely because of St Peter's Italian Church in nearby Saffron Hill. There are officially, as of 2014, over 200,000 Italians in London, and possibly many more. The Italian Procession of Our Lady of Mount Carmel and Sagra takes place each July in the streets surrounding the church.

A small number of Italian businesses remain from the nineteenth century including organ builders Chiappa Ltd, and food outlets such as the deli Terroni of Clerkenwell and Gazzano's. Many other Italian firms survive from the period but have relocated elsewhere.

== Nearby areas ==
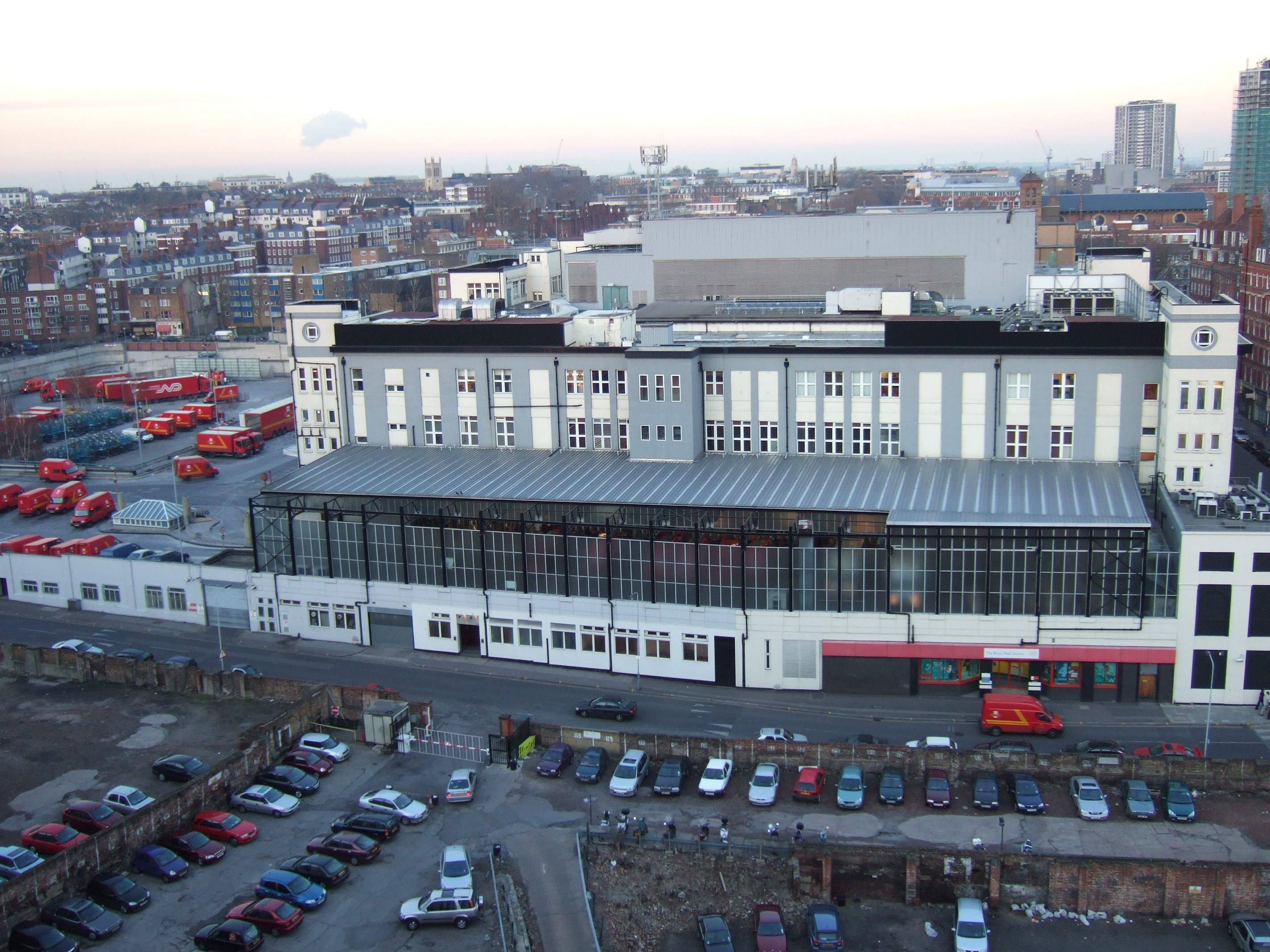
Royal Mail Mount Pleasant Sorting Office, London's largest sorting office

- St Pancras to the west
- Bloomsbury to the west
- Hatton Garden to the west
- Holborn to the southwest
- Smithfield to the south
- Barbican Estate and Barbican Arts Centre to the southeast
- Golden Lane Estate to the east
- St Luke's to the east
- Finsbury Estate to the north
- Islington to the north
- King's Cross to the northwest

== Transport ==
=== Rail ===
Farringdon station is the only station in Clerkenwell itself. 12.618 million journeys began or ended at Farringdon in 2017–18. The station first opened in 1863 as Farringdon Street.

==== London Underground ====
Farringdon is served by the London Underground Circle, Hammersmith and City and Metropolitan lines and the Elizabeth line. The next station west of Farringdon is King's Cross St Pancras, and all westbound trains call at Baker Street tube station. To the east, the next stations are Barbican, Moorgate and Liverpool Street in the City.

The Hammersmith and City and Circle lines both terminate in West London at Hammersmith (via Paddington). Eastbound, the Hammersmith and City line continues towards Barking in East London, whilst the Circle line loops around the City of London with trains heading westwards towards Tower Hill, Embankment and Victoria. The Metropolitan line terminates at Aldgate to the east, and to the west, trains carry passengers to Wembley Park, Uxbridge, and stations in Hertfordshire and Buckinghamshire.

There are several tube stations near the fringes of Clerkenwell:

- Angel (Northern line)
- Barbican (Circle, Hammersmith & City and Metropolitan lines)
- Chancery Lane (Central line)
- Moorgate (Circle, Hammersmith & City, Metropolitan and Northern lines)

==== National Rail ====
Farringdon is a National Rail station served on the Thameslink route, served by Thameslink trains run by Greater Thameslink Railway (GTR). This links Clerkenwell directly to Luton and Gatwick airports, and destinations including Bedford, Brighton, Cambridge, Luton, Peterborough, and destinations in South London and Kent. Moorgate is also nearby, with Great Northern services linking the area directly to North London and Hertfordshire destinations.

=== Road ===
Clerkenwell is in the London Congestion Charge Zone, as well as the London Low Emission and Ultra Low Emission Zones. Most roads in Clerkenwell are residential, but several key routes cross Clerkenwell.

Goswell Road carries the A1 between the City of London (Barbican) and Angel, with the road continuing northbound towards Highbury, Archway and the M1. Beyond London, the A1 passes through the East and North of England before terminating in Edinburgh, Scotland.

Farringdon Street is numbered the A201, which links Clerkenwell to King's Cross, Blackfriars, and Elephant & Castle. The A5201 (Clerkenwell Road/Old Street) also runs through Clerkenwell, linking Soho and Holborn in Central London with Shoreditch and the A10 to Clerkenwell's east.

=== Cycling ===
Transport for London (TfL) and the London Borough of Islington both provide cycling infrastructure in Clerkenwell, and the area is well connected to London's cycle network.

Cycle Superhighway 6 (CS6) runs north–south through Clerkenwell, which provides the area with direct links to King's Cross, Bloomsbury, Blackfriars and Elephant and Castle on a signed cycle route. To the south of Farringdon station, CS6 uses a segregated cycle track which runs parallel to Farringdon Road. South of Exmouth Market, signal-controlled junctions on Farringdon Road often give priority to cyclists, particularly where there is a cycle lane or track to separate cycles from other road traffic. In the north of Clerkenwell, CS6 runs on quieter "side-streets" towards Bloomsbury and King's Cross.

Quietways 2 and 10 are also nearby, both passing through Finsbury. Quietway 2 links Russell Square to Angel, Dalston and Walthamstow via Finsbury, whilst Quietway 10 runs from Finsbury to Finsbury Park. Quietways use cycle paths and "side-streets" allowing cyclists to avoid busy roads. Quietways 2 and 10 are signed cycle routes.

Bus and cycle lanes are also provided on Rosebery Avenue, Clerkenwell Road and Percival Street.

Santander Cycles, a cycle hire scheme across Central London, has docking stations with bicycles for hire across Clerkenwell.

== Notable people ==
- John Bell (d. 1556), Church of England bishop
- Thomas Birch (1705–1766), English historian
- Thomas Britton (1644–1714), English charcoal merchant best known as a concert promoter
- James Duff Brown (1862–1914), English librarian, information theorist, music biographer and educationalist
- Rev. Moses Browne (1704–1787), Church of England priest and poet
- Robert Burnside (1759–1826), English Baptist minister
- Phil Cameron (b. 1972), English entrepreneur, the founder of No.1 Traveller, and a former Tony and Olivier Award-winning theatre producer
- Edward Cave (1691–1754), English printer and journalist
- William Cavendish, 1st Duke of Newcastle (1592–1676), English polymath and aristocrat, having been a poet, equestrian, playwright, swordsman, politician, architect, diplomat and soldier
- Oliver Cromwell (1599–1658), English military and political leader and later Lord Protector of the Commonwealth of England, Scotland and Ireland
- Helkiah Crooke (1576–1648), Court physician to King James I of England, best remembered for his textbook on anatomy, Mikrokosmographia, a Description of the Body of Man
- Earl of Clanricarde (1832–1916), Anglo-Irish ascendancy nobleman and politician
- Daniel Defoe (c. 1660–1731), English trader, writer, journalist, pamphleteer and spy, now most famous for his novel Robinson Crusoe
- Charles Dickens (1812–1870), English writer and social critic
- Michael Fagan (b. 1948), Buckingham Palace intruder
- Zaha Hadid (1950–2016), Iraqi-British architect
- John Holwell (1649–1686?), English astrologer and mathematician
- Anthony Horowitz (b. 1955), English novelist and screenwriter specialising in mystery and suspense
- Bedford Alfred George Jezzard (1927–2005), English footballer and manager
- Vladimir Lenin (1870–1924), Russian communist revolutionary, politician and political theorist
- Hannah Rosetta Dinah Parks (1860–1931), stage name Cora Cardigan, a virtuoso flautist known as the 'Queen of Flute Players'
- Umberto Bert Rossi, criminal
- Charles Sabini (1889–1950), English criminal, leader of the Sabini gang
- Tom Smith (1823–1869), confectioner and creator of the Christmas cracker
- Jessie Vokes (1848–1884), actress and dancer
- Louis Wain (1860–1939), English artist
- John Weever (1576–1632), English antiquary and poet
- John Wilkes (1725–1797), English radical, journalist and politician
- Elizabeth Wilkinson (1700s), English bare-knuckle boxing champion, known to be the first female boxer
- George Ebenezer Williams (1783−1819), English organist and composer

== See also ==
- Clerkenwell Priory
- Coldbath Fields Prison
- Coldbath Fields Riot 1833
- The Nether World
