= Hockley-in-the-Hole =

Area of historic London

Coordinates: 51°31′23″N 0°6′30″W

Hockley-in-the-Hole was an area of Clerkenwell Green in central London where bull-baiting, bear-baiting and similar activities occurred in the 17th and 18th centuries. The Beargarden was located at Hockley-in-the-Hole where the Coach pub is today, at the junction of Back Hill and Ray Street, north of the junction of Clerkenwell Road and Farringdon Road.

== See also ==
- Beargarden
- Westminster Pit
