= Westminster Pit =

Well-known blood sport arena in nineteenth-century London

Coordinates: 51.4971°N 0.1333°W

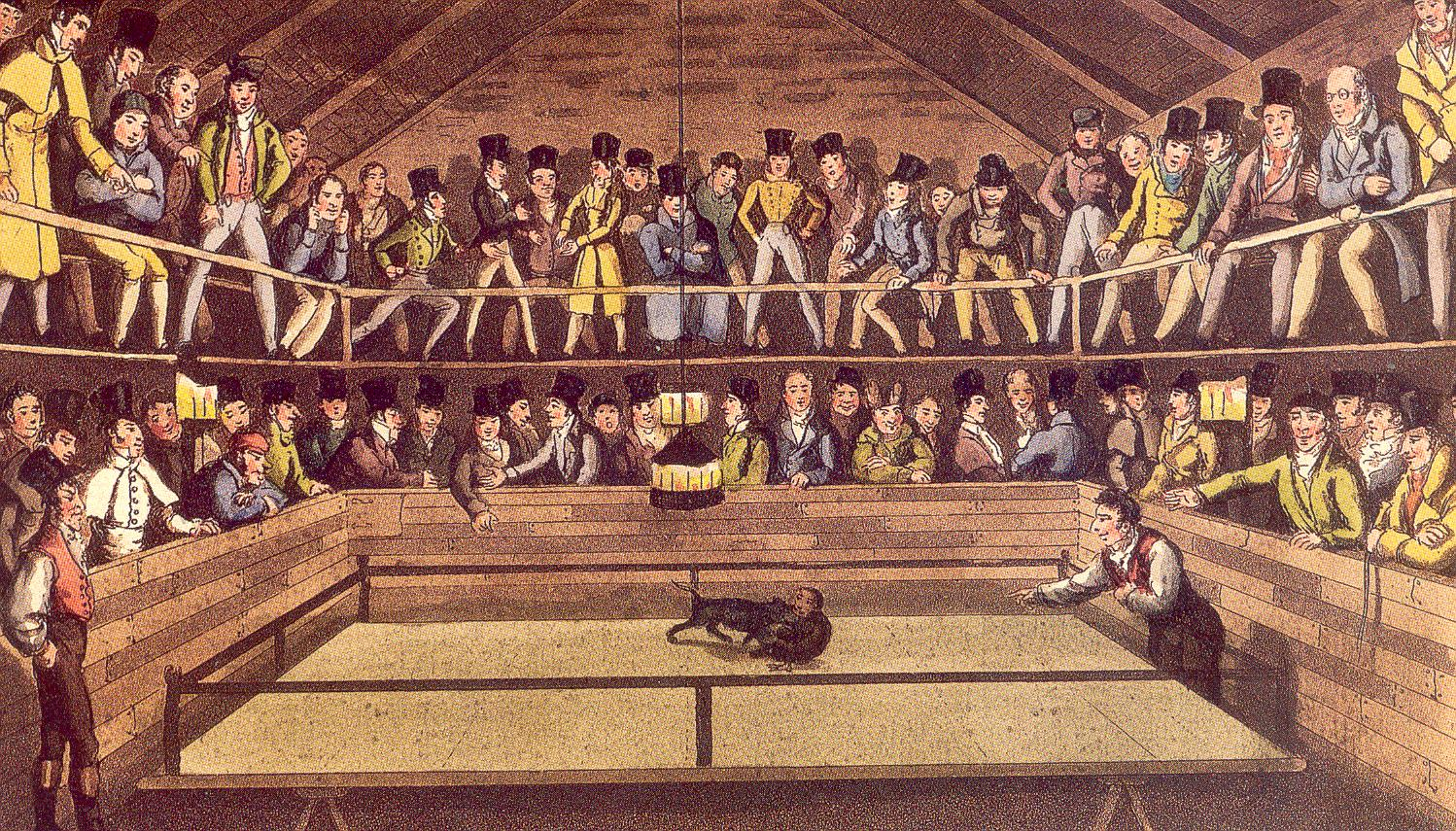
The Westminster-Pit: A Turn-up between a Dog and Jacco Macacco, the Fighting Monkey, by Henry Thomas Alken

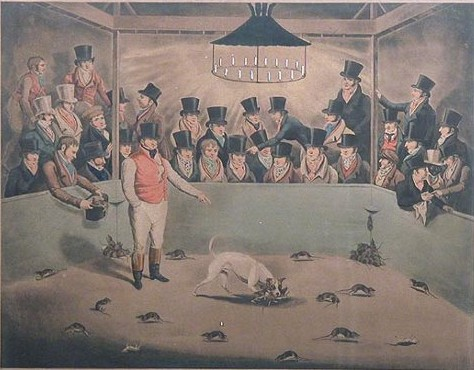
Billy, the celebrated rat-killing dog, circa 1823. Artist unknown.

The Westminster Pit was a well-known blood sport arena in nineteenth-century London, England. It reached a zenith of popularity between 1820 and 1830, and hosted such spectacles as dog-fighting, cock-fighting, bear-baiting, badger-baiting, monkey-baiting, and rat-baiting. A legal enterprise at the time, the Westminster Pit openly declared its activities, ushering notoriety on the district in which it existed.

The Westminster Pit was located on Duck Lane, Orchard Street (since renamed St. Matthew Street), and its dimensions were approximately 20 feet (6.1 m) by 18 feet (5.5 m). The gallery was 3 feet (0.91 m) above the arena and was capable of containing 200 people – or, by report of William Pitt Lennox, "perhaps a greater number of less refractory persons, for the common run of spectators were so obstreperous and so agitated by various emotions, according to the amount of bets depending, and the various turns of the conflict, that a decent orderly person would feel himself much incommoded by a considerably less number."

Prior to the beginning of matches, the stakes would be formalised and the dogs weighed. It was common in the Westminster Pit (and other venues like it) for cheating to occur, often by way of covering a dog with substances – such as acid or pepper – that would deter his opponent from biting him. For this reason, it was compulsory that all combatants be washed in water or milk, and a participant was permitted to lick his opponent's dog as a precaution.

Perhaps the most famous dog to perform in the Westminster Pit was a bull and terrier named "Billy", whose fame was his rat-baiting ability. The October 1822 edition of The Sporting Magazine describes his feat of killing 100 rats in six minutes and twenty-five seconds: almost six minutes faster than what was wagered. Billy's best time ever is recorded as five minutes, or slightly over "by a very few seconds". The name of Billy's owner is not consistently documented: some sources refer to a Charles Dew, some to Charley Westropp, and others to Charley Aistrop. Pierce Egan gives Billy's date of death as 23 February 1829. Later commentators have questioned the legitimacy of Billy's success; in particular, James Rodwell, in his 1858 The rat: its history & destructive character: With numerous anecdotes, stated: "let it be borne in mind, and I assert it on the testimony of living witnesses, that numbers of the rats were dead before the dog commenced, and that the whole had been poisoned with nux-vomica before being put into the pit . . . and when he did commence, several were thrown out as dead that were able to crawl away".

In 1830, an indictment was lodged against the Westminster Pit by the Society for the Prevention of Cruelty to Animals. The Society charged the proprietor, John King, with a nuisance, while noting that it was "indebted to corporal Denny, of No. 17, Queen Square, Westminster, and to James Yewen, of No. 6, Horseferry Road, Westminster . . . for obtaining a sufficient number of witnesses, residing on the spot, to prove the case as a nuisance." King was convicted, and, according to The Cottager's monthly visitor, "the prosecution completely suppressed that notorious sink of cruelty and vice".

== See also ==
- Beargarden
- Hockley-in-the-Hole
