= Jacco Macacco =

Fighting monkey

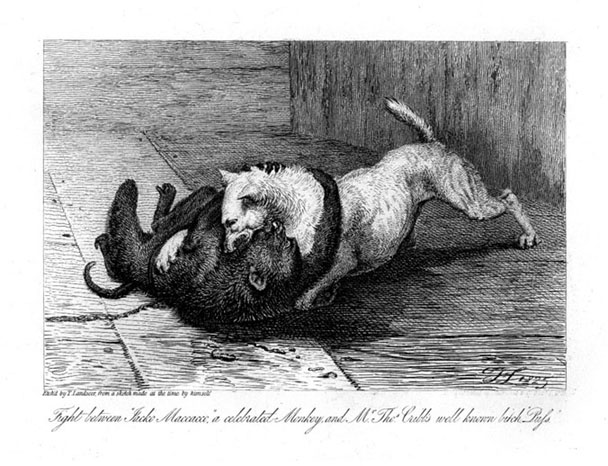
Fight between Jacko Maccacco a celebrated Monkey and Mr Tho. Cribbs well known bitch Puss by Thomas Landseer, 1825 etching from an earlier sketch by the artist.

Jacco Macacco was a monkey used in monkey-baiting matches at the Westminster Pit in London in the early 1820s. Though his exact species is unknown, evidence suggests he was most likely a macaque.

Jacco achieved some measure of fame in the sporting community through his reputed prodigious record of victories against dogs. But popular literature, artworks, and speeches by the animal welfare campaigner Richard Martin brought him much wider attention. Jacco's most famous fight, against the equally well-known bitch Puss, seems to have marked the end of his career: he may have died as a result of injuries received during the match or of an unrelated illness sometime afterwards. His ashes are claimed to be housed at the True Crime Museum in Hastings, East Sussex.

== History ==
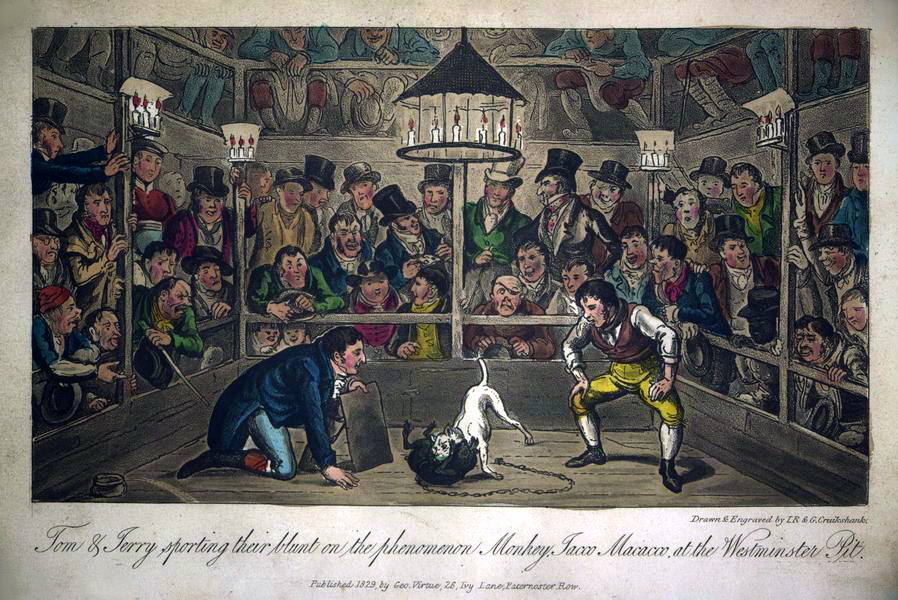
Tom and Jerry sporting their Blunt on the phenomenon monkey Jacco Macacco at the Westminster-Pit (1821) by George and Isaac Robert Cruikshank

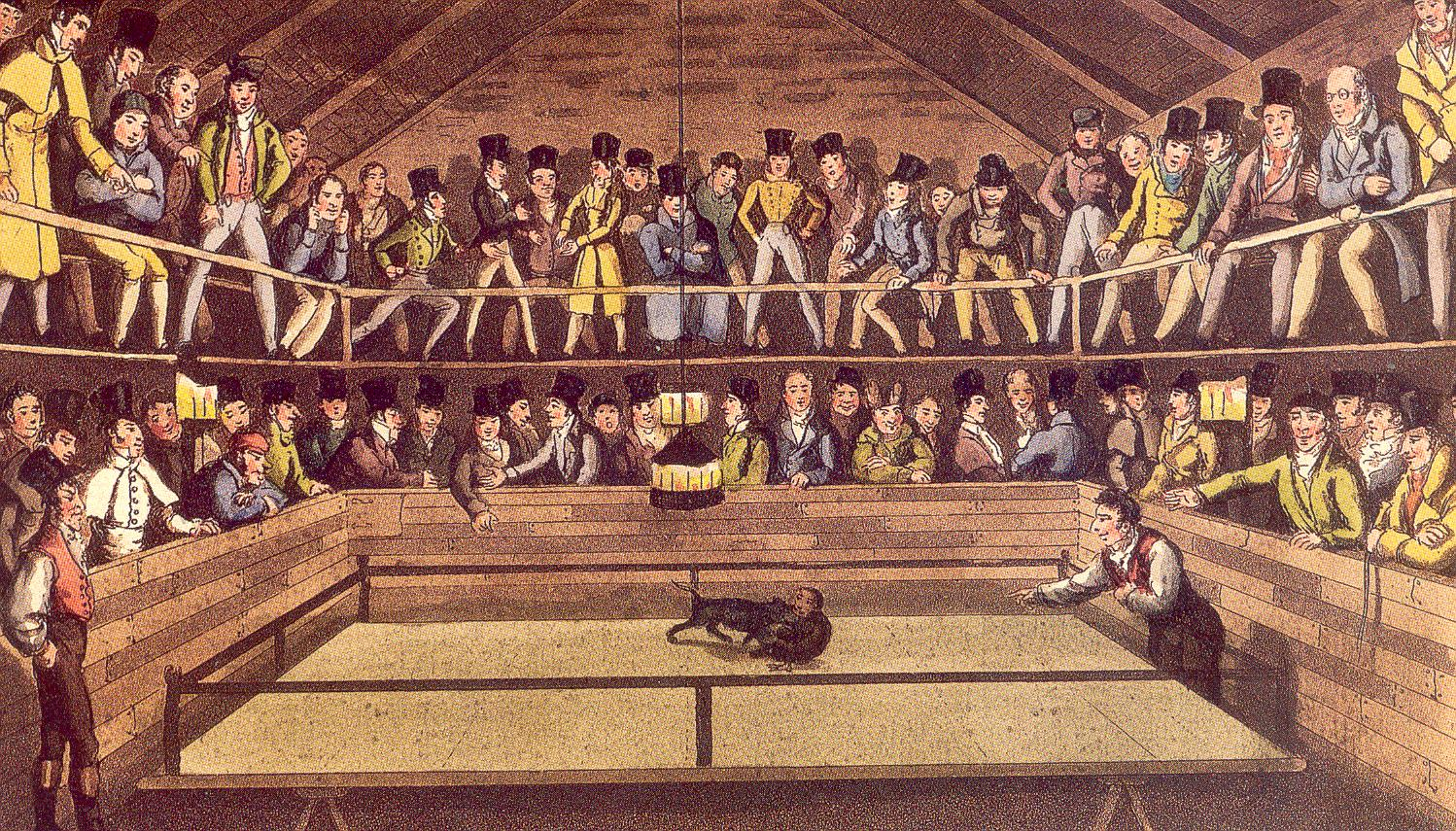
The Westminster-Pit: A Turn-up between a Dog and Jacco Macacco, the Fighting Monkey Thomas Sutherland's 1826 aquatint from an 1822 original by Henry Thomas Alken (Note: Sutherland's version omits the large bloodstain spreading across the floor of the pit which Alken had included in the original print.)

Most details on Jacco (Note: His name is seen with many spelling variations: "Jaco Macacco", "Jacco Macauco" "Jacko Macaco" etc.) come from second-hand or fictionalized accounts. In Pictures of Sporting Life and Character (1860), William Pitt Lennox gives a detailed account of Jacco's career: he was landed at Portsmouth where he fought dogs in a number of local sporting arenas before being purchased by a London sporting impresario and transported to Hoxton from where he continued his career, fighting in the Chick Lane and Tottenham Court Road pits, and earned one of his monikers as the "Hoxton Ape". Lennox writes that after biting his owner he was sold to the proprietor of the Westminster Pit, Charles Aistrop. (Note: Aistrop's name is also seen with a variety of other spellings, such as Eystropp, Eastup, Eastrop, Eastop and even Westrop.)

Although he was already somewhat famous, at the Westminster Pit Jacco's fights began to attract spectators from the higher reaches of society and considerable wagers were placed on his fights.

Aistrop gave a somewhat different account of Jacco's history. In a statement published in 1825 he claimed that Jacco had belonged to a sailor who had kept him for three years. Jacco had always been very calm but one day suddenly became aggressive over a saucer of milk and lacerated three of the sailor's fingers. The sailor had sold him to a silversmith called Carter from Hoxton. Carter had taught Jacco many tricks, but because the animal was extremely aggressive Carter had to purchase a large sheet of iron to use as a shield whenever he approached him. Carter finally tired of Jacco's constant attempts to attack him and took him into a nearby field where he set a dog on him. Jacco defeated both this dog and a second dog, and was then matched against a dog bred for fighting at Bethnal Green. When he also defeated this dog, his reputation began to grow and a fight was fixed for him at the Westminster Pit.

Lewis Strange Wingfield (1842–1891) wrote in his 1883 novel Abigail Rowe: a Chronicle of the Regency of an advertisement for a hundred guinea match between Jacco and "Belcher's celebrated dog Trusty". (Note: Probably Jem Belcher, a prizefighter and aficionado of dog fighting is meant, although Belcher died in 1811. "Trusty", one of the earliest examples of a bull and terrier, was renowned around 1805, so his career would have not have overlapped with Jacco either.) Pierce Egan also wrote about a battle between the "monkey phenomenon" and a dog in his popular account of the adventures of the characters Tom and Jerry in various sporting venues, Scenes from London Life. Although Egan's account of Tom and Jerry's visit to the Westminster Pit to see the fight between Jacco and the dog is detailed and is accompanied by a fine print by George Cruikshank, it is a humorous fiction and even though it may be based on real events it is impossible to judge how accurate the record of the fight is.

It appears that there was at least one contest between Jacco and the equally renowned white bull and terrier bitch, Puss, who belonged to the former prizefighter Tom Cribb. The various accounts of the fight and its outcome appear contradictory: the two animals may have been matched more than once, so reports may be from different fights. Aistrop puts the date of the contest as 13 June 1821. Lennox gives the terms of the fight on which he reports as a wager of fifty pounds that Puss could either kill Jacco or last five minutes with him (almost double the length of time which any of Jacco's previous opponents had managed) and reported Jacco as the victor though he did not record the eventual fate of the dog. Thomas Landseer produced an etching from his own sketch of Fight between Jacko Maccacco a celebrated Monkey and Mr Tho. Cribbs well known bitch Puss which shows the two combatants locked together tearing at one another's throats.

Richard Martin, the MP for Galway who was known as "Humanity Dick" for his philanthropy and constant attempts to introduce legislation improve the treatment of animals, gave an impassioned speech to Parliament in 1822 when introducing a bill to prevent the mistreatment of horses, cattle and sheep (his earlier attempt in 1821 had been defeated in the Lords). He claimed that he had seen a bill advertising a fight between Jacco and Puss:

Jacco Macacco, the celebrated monkey, will this day fight Tom Crib's white bitch, Puss. Jacco has fought many battles with some of the first dogs of the day, and has beat them all, and he hereby offers to fight any dog in England of double his own weight.

The result, according to Martin, was that after the fight had gone on for half an hour the dog had its carotid artery severed and Jacco's jaw had been torn away causing the death of both animals within two hours. Martin's bill passed, (Note: "Martin's Act" received Royal Assent on 22 July 1822 becoming the first legislation in the world to give animals some measure of protection from cruelty) but later his accounts of acts of animal cruelty were challenged in Parliament. Protected by Parliamentary privilege, he could not be accused of lying, but opponents managed to discredit some of his claims of acts of cruelty. Martin also revised his own account of the outcome of Jacco and Puss's match when he used the fight as an example of cruelty in an 1824 speech, claiming that the dog had been killed, but although the monkey's jaw had been torn away he had not been humanely dispatched but "allowed to languish in torment".

Martin's version of Jacco's death was disputed by the owner of the Westminster Pit, who claimed that Jacco had dealt with Puss in two and a half minutes (although he had not injured her fatally) and had died 15 months later of an unrelated illness. According to Aistrop, Jacco was then stuffed and sold to a Mr Shaw of Mitchum Common, which would have been impossible if the monkey's jaw was torn away. An account from George Charles Grantley Fitzhardinge Berkeley in My Life and Recollections also contradicted Martin's tale. Berkeley stated that he had attended the pit on the night of the match and had seen Tom Cribb cradling the dog's head in a suspicious manner before the fight began. When the dog was turned loose it immediately latched onto the monkey and gave Jacco no opportunity to fight back. Despite this the dog had appeared to be bleeding and slowly weakened. Cries from the audience eventually led to the contest being declared a draw and the two combatants were separated. Berkeley realised that Cribb had cut the dog before releasing it and this was confirmed by the unrepentant Cribb who claimed that it was for the purposes of giving the audience a good show. There is a possibility that the two animals fought twice: a poster from 1821 advertised a match between Jacco and a 19-pound bitch that was to take place on 27 November 1821 and referred to a previous match between Jacco and Puss.

== Record and fighting style ==
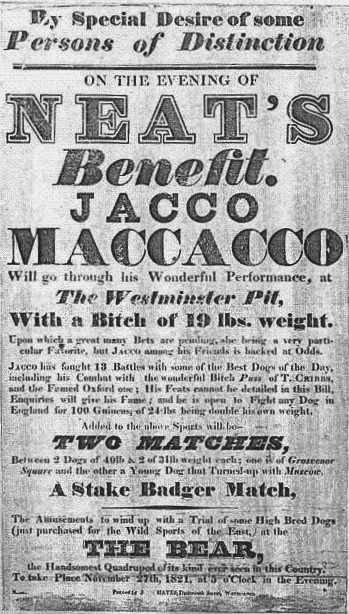
An 1821 advertising broadsheet for a match between Jacco and a 19-pound bitch. Although Jacco's fight was the headline, the event also featured dog fights, badger-baiting and the Westminster Pit's renowned bear.

Jacco was reported to weigh 10 to 12 pounds (4.5 to 5.4 kg) and was pitched against dogs of up to twice his weight. The 1821 advertising broadsheet for his match against the 19 pounds (8.6 kg) bitch states he was open to challenges from "any dog in England for 100 Guineas of 24lbs being double his own weight". According to Lennox:

His mode of attack, or rather of defence, was, at first, to present his back or neck to the dog, and to shift and tumble about until he could lay hold on the arm or chest, when he ascended to the windpipe, clawing and biting away, which usually occupied him about one minute and a half, and if his antagonist was not speedily with drawn, his death was certain; the monkey exhibited a frightful appearance, being deluged with blood — but it was that of his opponent alone; as the toughness and flexibility of his own skin rendered him impervious to the teeth of the dog.

Lennox writes that after several fights, Jacco adapted his technique and would overcome his canine opponents by leaping directly on their backs and manoeuvring himself into a position where he could tear at their windpipes while remaining out of reach of their jaws. Lennox reports him as having overcome fourteen opponents in total and the advertising broadsheet states he had already been involved in thirteen matches "with some of the best dogs of the day including his combat with the wonderful bitch Puss of T. Cribbs and the famed Oxford one". (Note: Wingfield writes in his novel that Jacco had beaten nine opponents at the time of the match with Belcher's dog.)

Both Berkeley and Lawrence Fitz-Barnard (writing in Fighting Sports in 1922) cast doubt on Jacco's ability to beat any canine opponent in an un-rigged match though. Berkeley points to the bleeding of the dogs by Cribb and stresses the tendency of writers to exaggerate their accounts of simian ferocity and strength, while Fitz-Barnard dismisses out-of-hand the possibility of any but the largest apes being able to prevail against a fighting dog. Fitz-Barnard claims that Jacco was a "stock performer and put up a great battle with an indifferent dog. The monkey was given a club to assist him..." Most accounts agree that Jacco was held in a small cage when not fighting and was secured by a short length of thin metal chain during his matches.

== Identification ==
Which species of monkey or ape Jacco belonged to is unknown. Lennox initially describes him as coming from Africa, but later writes that he belonged to the Asian gibbon family:

Jacko was of that species of Simiae denominated the Gibbon, which sit with their forepaws upon the ground; he was of a cinerous or ashy colour, with black fingers and muzzle. ... In appearance he was neither old nor ugly.

Egan describes him as the "famed Italian monkey", Umberto Cuomo writing in Il Bulldog in 2002 says he was probably a mandrill. Before Aistrop had acquired Jacco, he had featured a baboon at the Westminster Pit in an attempt to capitalise on Jacco's growing fame, but, according to Lennox, this had only served to emphasise Jacco's skill by comparison. Neither the Cruikshanks' aquatint nor Henry Alken's depiction of Jacco fighting an unidentified opponent are detailed enough to identify Jacco's species, even if they are taken from life (the Cruickshanks are more interested in depicting the spectators than in the accuracy of the depiction of the monkey). Landseer's etching shows Jacco with a short tail and is annotated with "...from a sketch made at the time by himself". Aistrop described Jacco as "canine mouthed and much larger than the common monkey".

The most accurate depiction of Jacco Macacco would seem to be an etching in the collection of the British Museum described as 'Head of a fighting monkey called Jacco Macacco in three-quarter profile to right, with slightly open mouth, wearing a collar. 1826'. This detailed etching shows a monkey with a pronounced muzzle and a distinctively pointed ear. The general impression appears to be consistent with the subject being a macaque of some type (most likely a Barbary macaque, rhesus macaque or bonnet macaque). The monkey's face in this etching is similar in appearance to the head of the monkey shown in the Landseer etching. The relatively short tail length indicated by Landseer would appear to point towards an identification as a rhesus macaque (Barbary macaques have only vestigial tails and bonnet macaques have long tails).

Rhesus macaques adapt well to the presence of humans and often live in or near urban environments, which may explain Jacco Macacco having come into the possession of a sailor (presumably while on shore leave in a port). The Alken depiction is also broadly consistent with an identification as a rhesus macaque. However, rhesus macaques are relatively light in colour (both in fur and skin) which seems inconsistent with, for example, Lennox's description and Cruikshank's depiction of a darker pigmentation. As mentioned above, Cruikshank's depiction of the monkey is indistinct and the coloration (black monkey vs white dog) may be more for the sake of clarity than as a reflection of historical reality. The British Museum etching and the Landseer depiction, both of which appear to have been made taken from life (and attempt to show the actual monkey, rather than a generic simian) would seem to be the most accurate means of attempting an identification at the present time. Alternative identifications such as gibbon, mandrill, baboon or lemur do not seem to be borne out by the various pictorial depictions.

The term Macacco was in use as a general term for a monkey at the time; it came from the Portuguese macaco meaning "monkey," a derivative of a Bantu word that had been exported to Brazil where it was used to describe various type of monkey in the 17th century. As different authors applied the term to different species it is difficult to know which species, genus or family was meant. Macaca was given as a name to a widespread genus of Old World monkeys (the macaques) in 1799. Jaco was the specific name for a lemur and the term "Macauco" was also in general use to mean lemur, but there is no suggestion that Jacco was a lemur — Lennox specifically discounts this, and credits Jacco's forename as deriving from the "Jolly Jack Tars" that transported him to England and first observed his fighting abilities. Jacco's fame may have been associated with the rise of a Cockney slang word for a monkey "Murkauker" in the middle of the 19th century (although this was already obsolete by the 1890s), and "Jacco Macacco" itself was at least sometimes used as a generalised term for a monkey at the same period. Aistrop claimed that the sailor that had originally owned him had taken him from the "Isle of Maccacco".

== See also ==
- List of individual monkeys
