= The Great Boobee =

Song

The Great Boobee is an English broadside ballad from the 17th century. It tells the story of a country boy who goes to London and makes a fool of himself. Copies of the broadside can be found at the British Library, the University of Glasgow Library, and Magdalene College, Cambridge. Facsimile transcriptions are also available on-line for public consumption.

== Synopsis ==
The ballad is told in two parts. In the first part, the narrator introduces himself. He once had a house, cattle, and land, but he lost it all by being tricked. The narrator's dad left him a great estate, but it's all gone now. He tells us that he went to school for seven years, with good intentions about learning, but ended up playing all the time and never even opening his book. Next, he tried plowing, but he couldn't do it and his dad beat him for being a fool, so he ran away to London. In London, everybody calls him a fool. He walks down the street and people laugh at him. He goes to Westminster and the catacombs, but everywhere he goes he is laughed at.

In the second part of the ballad, he meets gallants on the street, but makes a fool of himself again. He gets beaten up by a cook, and then tricked by a prostitute who offers him wine. He takes her to a tavern, where she picks his pocket. The vintner throws him out. Next, he goes to Paris Garden, where they practice bear-baiting and bull-baiting, but he didn't like the sport and the "Garden Bull" tossed him. Others at the garden had to run in and save him, and they all told him he "stunk" so he ran away. Next, he tried to cross the Thames, and he accidentally fell in and was rescued by the Water-man. In the final stanza, he tells us that if he can just get a license to "play before the Bears," or become an entertainer at the Beargarden, people will stop calling him a fool.

== Cultural and historical significance ==
John Ashton includes The Great Boobee in his Century of Ballads as an example of the humor to be drawn from the country bumpkin. He compares the ballad to other ballads that deal with the relationship between country and city differently, such as The Merry Milk Maids which "exalt the countryman over the town servant" and The Country Lass which celebrates country delights over city charms.

The website for "17th Century Reenacting and Living History Resources" cites The Great Boobee as primarily interesting for the reenactor because of the "walking tour" it provides of 17th-century London.

=== Recordings ===
St. George's Canzona on Music For Roundheads and Cavaliers (1994)
