= Farringdon Road =

Road in Clerkenwell, London

Coordinates: 51°31′13″N 0°06′21″W

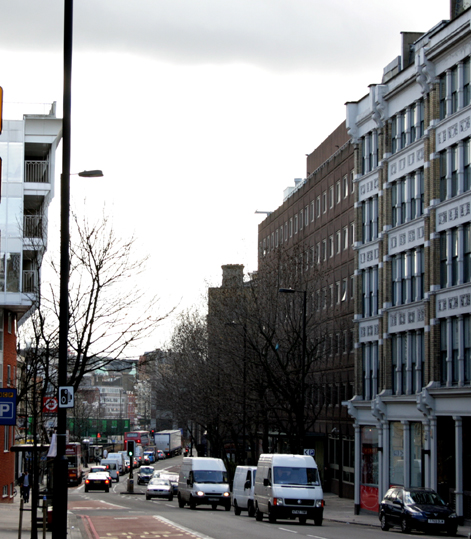
Part of Farringdon Road pictured in 2007.

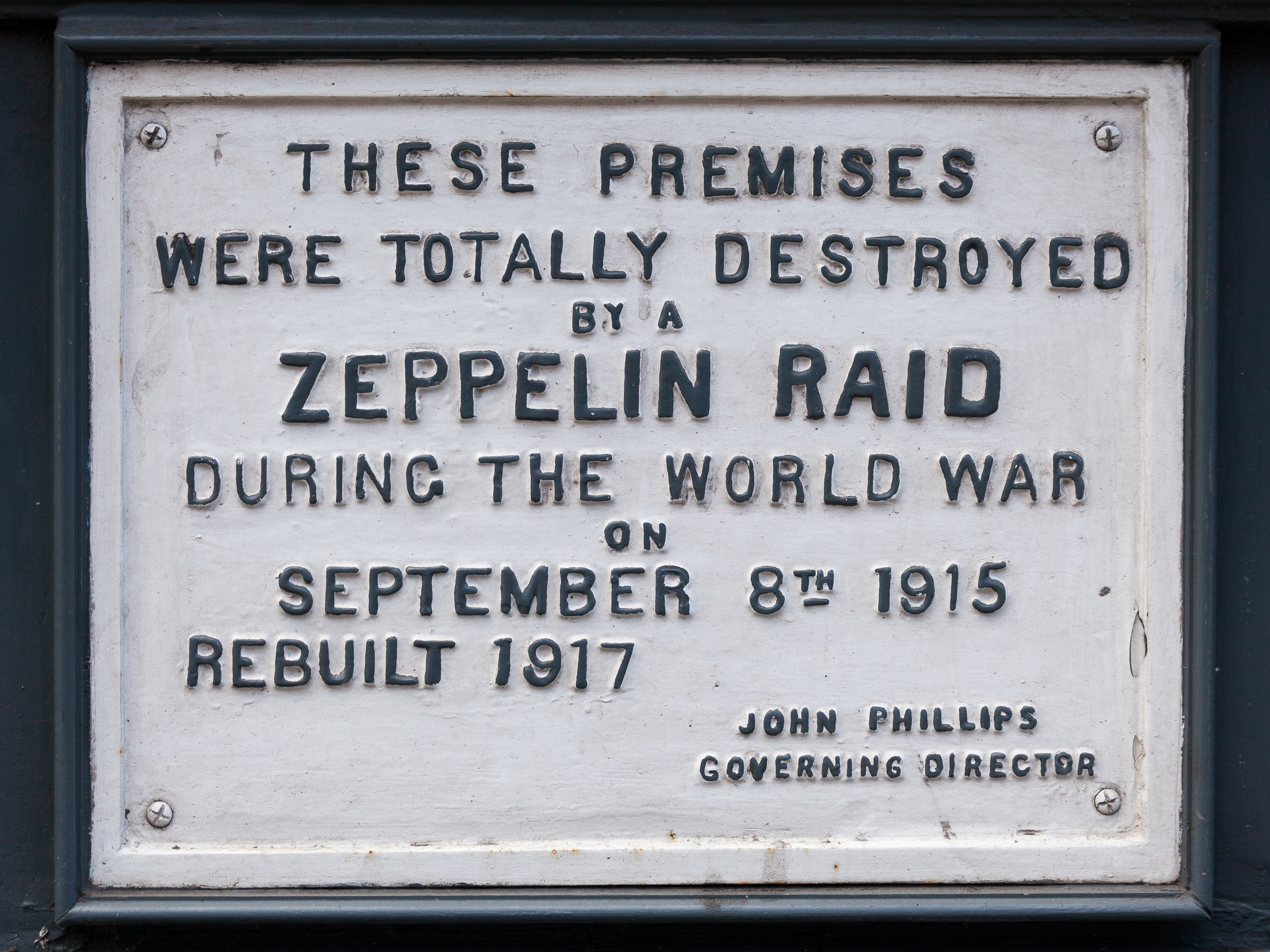
Plaque commemorating a Zeppelin raid on 61 Farringdon Road.

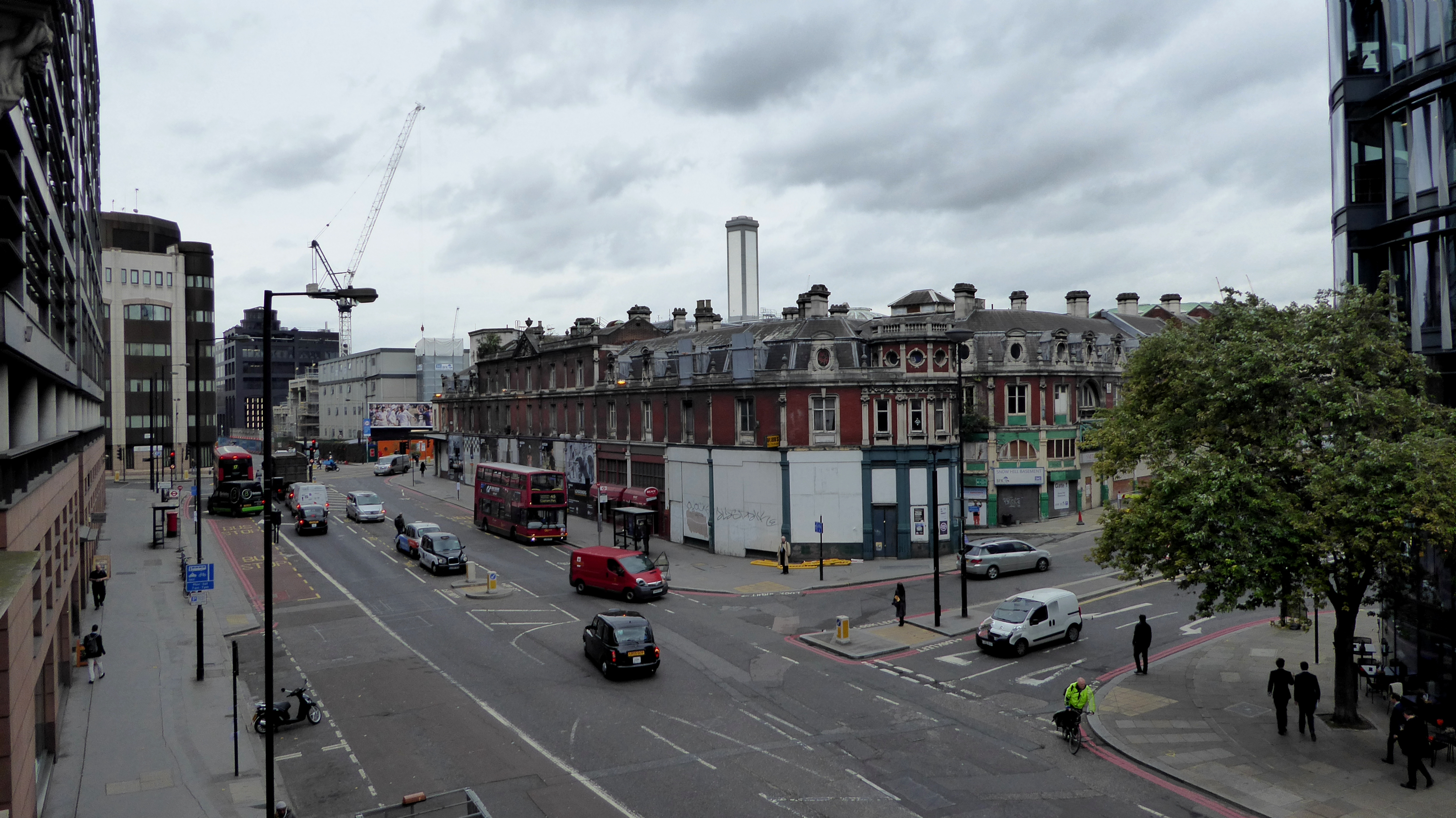
Farringdon Street, south of Farringdon Road

Farringdon Road is a road in Clerkenwell, London.

== Route ==
Farringdon Road is part of the A201 route connecting King's Cross to Elephant and Castle. It goes southeast from King's Cross, crossing Rosebery Avenue, then turns south, crossing Clerkenwell Road before going past Farringdon station. It finishes on the border between the City of London, the London Borough of Camden and the London Borough of Islington, at a junction with Charterhouse Street. Its line continues into the city as Farringdon Street.

== History ==
The road's construction, taking almost 20 years between the 1840s and the 1860s, is considered one of the greatest urban engineering achievements of the 19th century. It was one of the first engineered multi-lane roads, and buried the River Fleet in a system of tunnels, solving one of London's most significant sanitary problems. Its construction also included the building of the world's first stretch of underground railway, the Metropolitan Railway that later became part of the London Underground running beneath Farringdon Road from King's Cross St. Pancras into the City at Farringdon station.

The construction of Farringdon Road necessitated the removal of the Fleet Market that had been built in 1736 above the course of the River Fleet, which is now London's largest subterranean river. North of the market was Hockley-in-the-Hole (around Ray Street Bridge), an area notorious for bear-baiting and similar activities.

Farringdon Road was also home to the notorious Fleet Prison. It was on this side of the prison that a grille was built into the Farringdon Street prison wall, so that prisoners might beg alms from passers-by. Charles Dickens describes this in his book The Pickwick Papers:

Most of our readers will remember, that, until within a very few years past, there was a kind of iron cage in the wall of the Fleet Prison, within which was posted some man of hungry looks, who, from time to time, rattled a money-box, and exclaimed in a mournful voice, 'Pray, remember the poor debtors; pray remember the poor debtors'. The receipts of this box, when there were any, were divided among the poor prisoners; and the men on the poor side relieved each other in this degrading office. Although this custom has been abolished, and the cage is now boarded up, the miserable and destitute condition of these unhappy persons remains the same. We no longer suffer them to appeal at the prison gates to the charity and compassion of the passersby; but we still leave unblotted the leaves of our statute book, for the reverence and admiration of succeeding ages, the just and wholesome law which declares that the sturdy felon shall be fed and clothed, and that the penniless debtor shall be left to die of starvation and nakedness. This is no fiction.

Farringdon Road was the best known site in London for book barrows. In the 19th and 20th centuries books were sold by itinerant street traders from two-wheeled flat-bed barrows on which books were laid out for sale. Although book barrows could be found elsewhere in London the 30 or 40 barrows on Farringdon Road tended to offer the better quality volumes. As a result, bibliophiles would visit in search of rare books at a modest price.

== Properties ==
Amongst the notable buildings on Farringdon Road are the former headquarters of The Guardian newspaper at Nos. 119–141, the so-called Zeppelin Building at No. 61 built in 1917 after a Zeppelin raid during World War I, and the western side of Smithfield Market.

A notorious building on Farringdon Road was the Farringdon Road Buildings, a five-tenement block of dwellings built for the working classes during the Victorian era. Lacking bathrooms and with poor sanitary conditions this building, one of the last slum dwellings to exist in central London, was still occupied until the early 1970s. Common features were poor lighting, overcrowding, with rat- and cockroach-infested living conditions, and people trapped by their own poverty. The residents were re-housed by Islington Borough Council and the buildings, close to Exmouth Market and the Royal Mail Mount Pleasant Sorting Office, were pulled down in the mid-1970s to be replaced by a multi-storey car park. A contemporary description of the buildings is given in George Gissing's novel The Nether World.

The dwellings in Farringdon Road had an annex at the bottom of Saffron Hill, have been restored, and now belong to the De Beers Diamond Group. The original set of dwellings was occupied predominantly by Italians and formed part of "Little Italy".

== See also ==
- Hockley-in-the-Hole

== Sources ==
Weinreb, Ben; Hibbert, Christopher; Keay, John; Keay, Julia, eds. (2008) [1983]. The London Encyclopaedia (Third ed.). Macmillan. ISBN 978-1-405-04924-5.
