= Sackerson =

Bear

"Sackerson loose" by Robert William Buss

Sackerson was a famous brown bear which was baited in London's Beargarden in the late 16th century.

The bear appears in Shakespeare's The Merry Wives of Windsor in which Slender boasts to Anne Page that, "That’s meate and drinke to me now: I have seene Sackerson loose, twenty times, and have taken him by the Chaine: but (I warrant you) the women have so cride and shrekt at it, that it past:"

Such bears were named after their owners. John Sackerson (1541–95) was the landlord of the Bear Inn in Nantwich and kept a stable of bears and so may have supplied this one.

== See also ==
- List of individual bears
