= Bear-leader =

Historical profession in blood sport

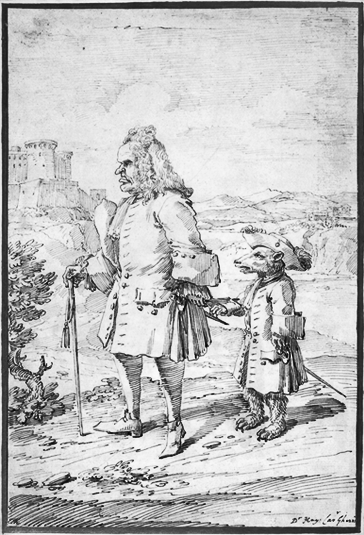
A caricature of a bear-leader

A bear-leader was historically a man who led bears about the country. In the Middle Ages and the Tudor period, these animals were chiefly used in the blood sport of bear-baiting and were led from village to village. Performing bears were also common; their keepers were generally Frenchmen or Italians.

Later, the phrase bear-leader came colloquially to mean a tutor or guardian, who escorted any young man of rank or wealth on his travels.

Until well into the 1990s, Roma, like the Ursari in Romania, Mečkara in Bulgaria and Serbia, and Ajdžide in Turkey carried out this activity.

The occupation was gradually banned by animal rights activists.
