= Beargarden =

Bloodsports venue in 16th and 17th century London

Coordinates: 51°30′30″N 0°5′44″W

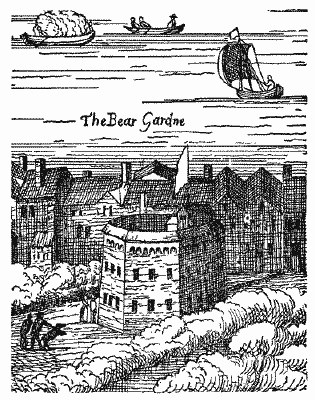
The Beargarden from Visscher's Map of London, published in 1616, but representing the city as it was several years earlier.

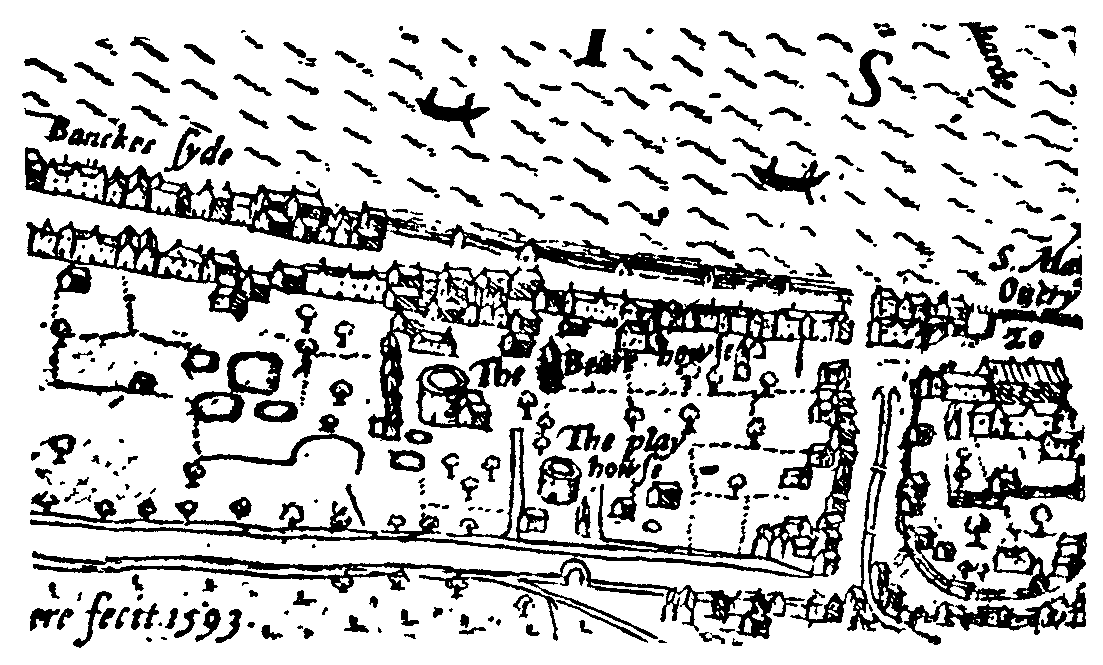
The Beargarden (labelled The Bear howſe) and the Rose Theatre (labelled The play howſe) depicted in Norden's Map of London, 1593

The Beargarden was a facility for bear-baiting, bull-baiting, and other "animal sports" in the London area during the 16th and 17th centuries, from the Elizabethan era to the English Restoration period. Baiting is a blood sport where an animal is tormented or attacked by another animal, often dogs, for the purpose of entertainment or gambling. Samuel Pepys visited the venue in 1666 and described it as "a rude and nasty pleasure". The last recorded event at the Beargarden was the baiting of "a fine but vicious horse" in 1682.

== History ==
The Beargarden was constructed as a round or polygonal open structure, comparable to the public theatres built in and around London starting in 1576. Contemporaneous illustrated maps of the city show a substantial three-storey building that resembles the theatres nearby. It was located in the Bankside, across from the City of London on the south bank of the River Thames in Southwark; but its exact location is unclear, and apparently changed over time. Documentary sources from the middle 16th century refer to the bear-baiting rink as being in Paris Garden, the liberty at the western end of the Bankside. The names of the facility and its location were merged in popular usage: John Stow, writing in 1583, calls it "The Beare-garden, commonly called the Paris garden." Late-16th-century sources, however – the Speculum Britanniae map of 1593, and the Civitas Londini map of 1600 – show the Beargarden farther to the east, in the liberty of the Clink, where it sits on the northwestern side of the Rose Theatre. The building could have been moved from its original location, much as The Theatre was moved and rebuilt into the Globe Theatre in 1598–99.

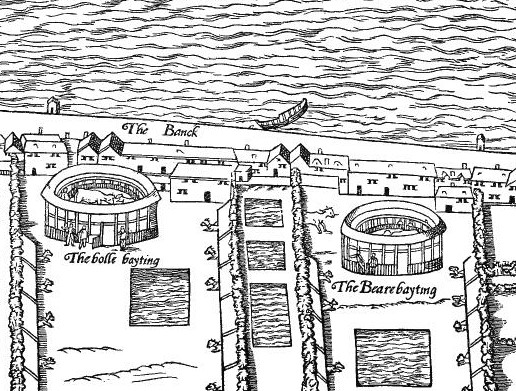
London bear and bull baiting ring South Bank, 1561 (Agas Map), public domain, British History Online

The date of the Beargarden's construction is unknown; it was in existence by the 1560s, when it is shown on the "woodcut" map of the city. Questions of the Beargarden's location and date are complicated by the fact that animal sports were conducted at more than one place in Southwark in this era; the Agas map shows both a bull-baiting and a bear-baiting ring, situated near each other (bulls to the west, bears to the east). John Taylor the Water Poet, testifying in the Court of Exchequer in 1620 or 1621, said that "the game of bear-baiting hath been kept in four several [i.e. separate] places, at Mason Stairs on the Bankside, near Maid Lane by the corner of Pike Garden, at the beargarden which was parcel of the possession of William Payne, and at the place where they now are kept."

Yet one main bear-baiting facility, the "Paris Garden", stood out in the public mind. In 1578, William Fleetwood, "Sergeant-in-law" and Recorder of London, described it as a place where foreign ambassadors met their spies and agents; at night it was so dark and obscured by trees that a man needed "cat's eyes" to see. Ambassadors and travellers were often shown the Beargarden; The prominent French nobleman the Duke of Biron was escorted there by Sir Walter Raleigh on September 7, 1601.

On Sunday, January 13, 1583, eight people were killed and others injured when the scaffold seating in the Beargarden collapsed under their weight. Puritan commentators, hostile to animal baiting as they were to other sports and pastimes (like play-going), attributed the accident to God's displeasure. The Beargarden closed for a time, but reopened a few months later.

The English monarchy had had an official "bearward", an officer in charge of its "bears, bulls, and mastiff dogs", at least from the reign of Richard III. In 1573 a Ralph Bowes was appointed Queen Elizabeth I's "Master of Her Majesty's Game at Paris Garden". (Elizabeth herself, like other royals and aristocrats of her era, was a passionate fan of animal baiting.) In 1604, Philip Henslowe (who had a financial interest in bear-baiting at least from 1594) and his son-in-law Edward Alleyn purchased the royal office of the Mastership for £450, and maintained the practice of animal baiting along with their other business of theatre production. Henslowe bought out Alleyn's share in 1611, for £580 (though Alleyn re-acquired his share upon Henslowe's 1616 death). In 1613, Henslowe and new partner Jacob Meade tore down the Beargarden, and in 1614 replaced it with the Hope Theatre. The Hope was equipped as a dual-purpose venue, hosting both stage plays and animal sports. Gradually, though, fewer plays were staged there, and the Hope was generally called the Beargarden after its primary use. Samuel Pepys, in an entry in his famous Diary, describes a visit he and his wife paid to the Hope/Beargarden on August 14, 1666. (He called the spectacle "a rude and nasty pleasure".)

== Spectacle ==
Surviving descriptions of the entertainment offered at the Beargarden portray people enjoying the scene. The crowds were amused at the whipping of the old blind bear "Harry Hunks" (Some bears were given names: "George Stone", "Ned Whiting", and the famous, "Sackerson".) There are extant descriptions of horses with apes tied to their backs set upon by dogs. An early account, from the visiting Duke of Najera in 1544, mentions

"...a pony with an ape fastened on its back, and to see the animal kicking among the dogs, with the screams of the ape, beholding the curs hanging from the ears and neck of the pony, is very laughable."

Pepys describes a bull tossing a dog into a spectators' box. Others mention the bulls tossing dogs into the air and then catching the falling dogs on their horns again. On a few rare occasions (in 1604 and 1605, and in 1609 and 1610), lions were baited.

The shows at the Beargarden had surprising aspects; according to contemporary accounts, music and fireworks were used, and special effects were employed. German tourist Lupold von Wedel was at the Beargarden on August 23, 1584; he left a description that cites the usual and expected baiting of bulls and bears, and a horse chased by the dogs, plus people dancing, and a man who threw white bread to the crowd (they "scrambled for it"). And then,

"Right over the middle of the place a rose was fixed, this rose being set on fire by a rocket: suddenly lots of apples and pears fell out of it down upon the people standing below. Whilst the people were scrambling for the apples, some rockets were made to fall down upon them out of the rose, which caused a great fright but amused the spectators. After this, rockets and other fireworks came flying out of all corners, and that was the end..."

The last recorded instance of animal baiting at the Hope/Beargarden occurred on April 12, 1682, when "a fine but vicious horse was advertised to be baited to death for the amusement of the Moroccan ambassador... and for as many as would pay to see it." The horse reportedly had killed several men and other horses. It survived and beat off the dogs; to please the clamoring crowd, the horse was stabbed to death with a sword.

Nowadays, by contrast, the term "Bear Garden" is employed by a retailer of teddy bears and stuffed animals. However, the Bear Pit is not entirely forgotten: Alleyn bought the manor of Dulwich in 1605 and in the course of establishing his tenure, implemented a requirement of Sir Francis Bacon's Star Chamber to establish a charitable school "for 12 poor children of the parish of Camberwell" – who appear in practice to have often been the players of the female parts at the Globe. Their own sub-company, named the Bear Pit, continued in the original School, which passed through the Dulwich College Lower School in the 1850s to Alleyn's School in 1887, and remains active to this day, run without any parental or scholastic support, regularly producing household names in the theatre. The intention of theatre as a medium for the young was further promoted by the secondment of the School's Head of English, Michael Croft, in the late 1950s to establish the National Youth Theatre. Although many members were from the School, their outreach achieved the target of opening the theatre to many of less advantaged backgrounds, and a worldwide movement resulted.

== Other Beargardens ==
Another Beargarden was located in Hockley-in-the-Hole at Clerkenwell Green in central London where bull-baiting, bear-baiting and similar activities occurred in the 17th and 18th centuries. During Queen Anne's time, this Beargarden rivalled the Southwark Beargarden of the Elizabethan era.

== See also ==
- Hockley-in-the-Hole
- Westminster Pit
