= Rosebery Avenue =

Road in Central London

Coordinates: 51°31′30.77″N 0°6′37.88″W

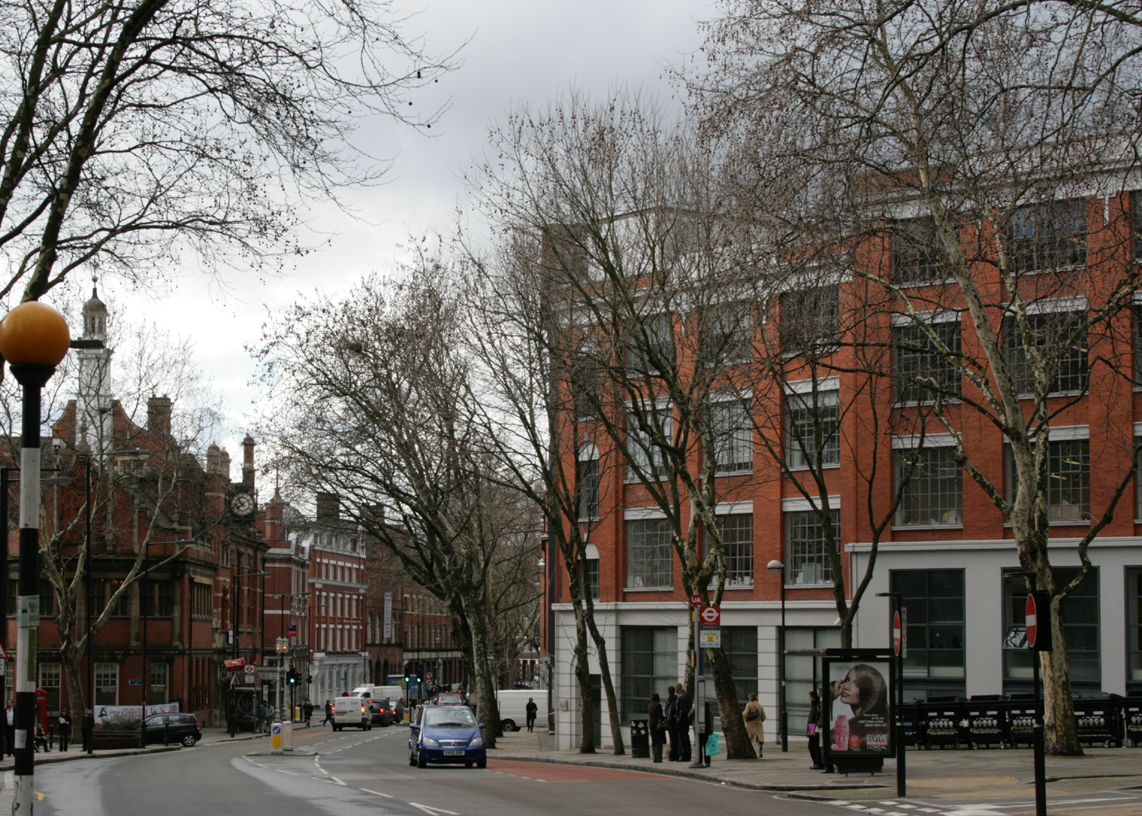
Rosebery Avenue

Rosebery Avenue is a major thoroughfare in the boroughs of Camden and Islington in London, England. It starts southwest from the intersection with Theobald's Road, Holborn, and ends northeast at St John Street, Clerkenwell. Finsbury Town Hall and Charles Rowan House are among properties located on this road.
