= Bull-baiting =

Blood sport

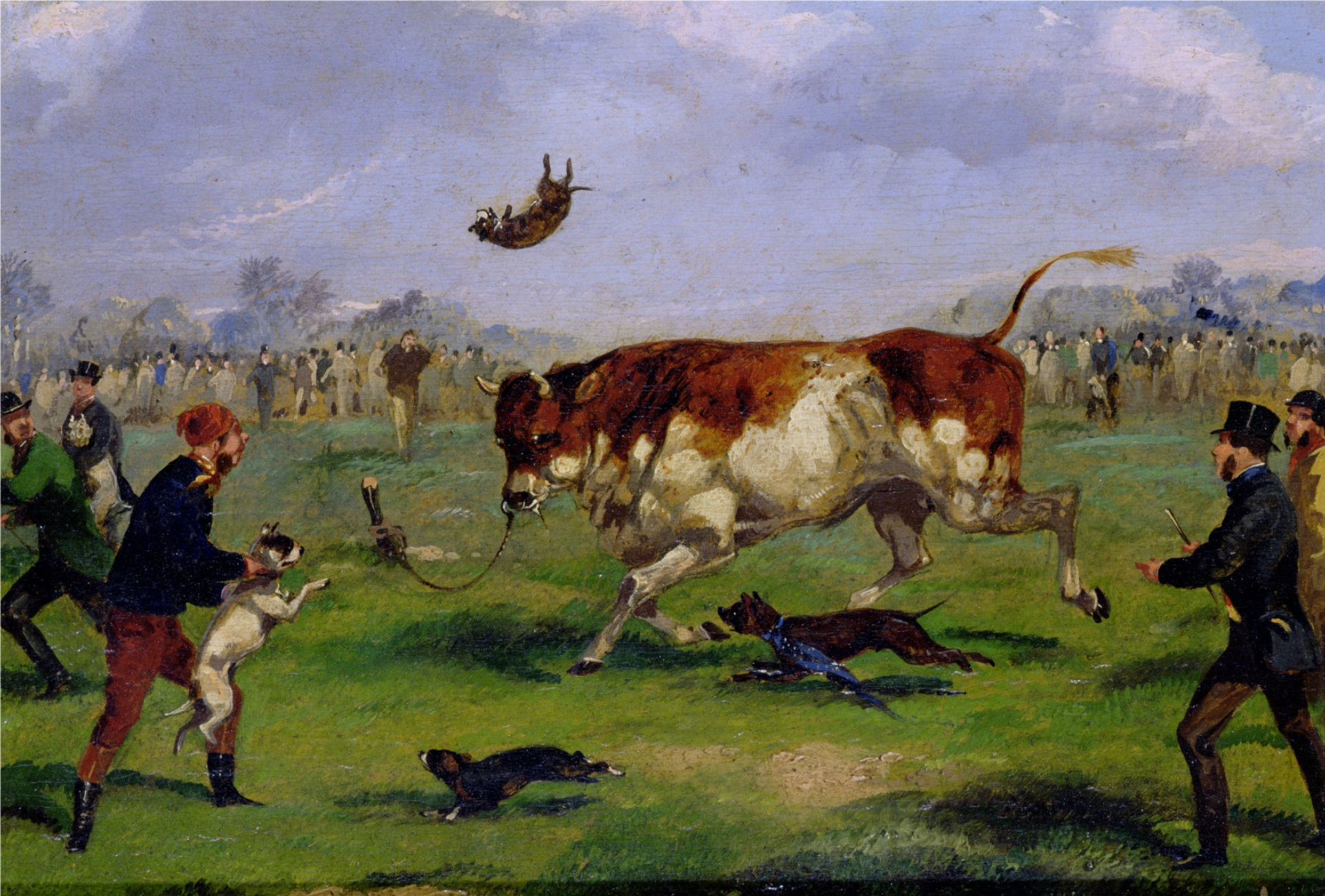
Bull-baiting in the 19th century, painted by Samuel Henry Alken.

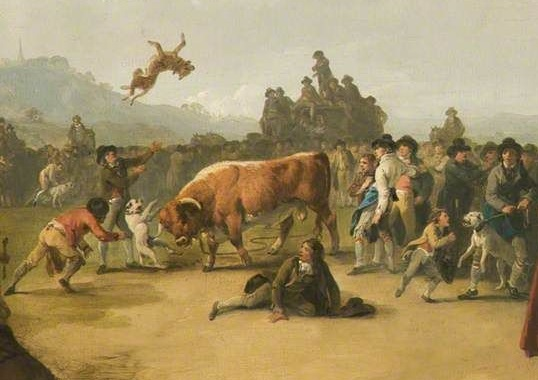
Detail from "Bull-baiting" by Julius Caesar Ibbetson, circa 1817.

Bull-baiting (or bullbaiting) is a blood sport involving pitting a bull against dogs with the aim of subduing the bull by biting and holding onto its nose or neck, which often resulted in the death of the bull. The Cruelty to Animals Act 1835 effectively outlawed bull-baiting in Britain, although the practice persisted illegally in some rural areas for a time.

== History ==
=== England ===
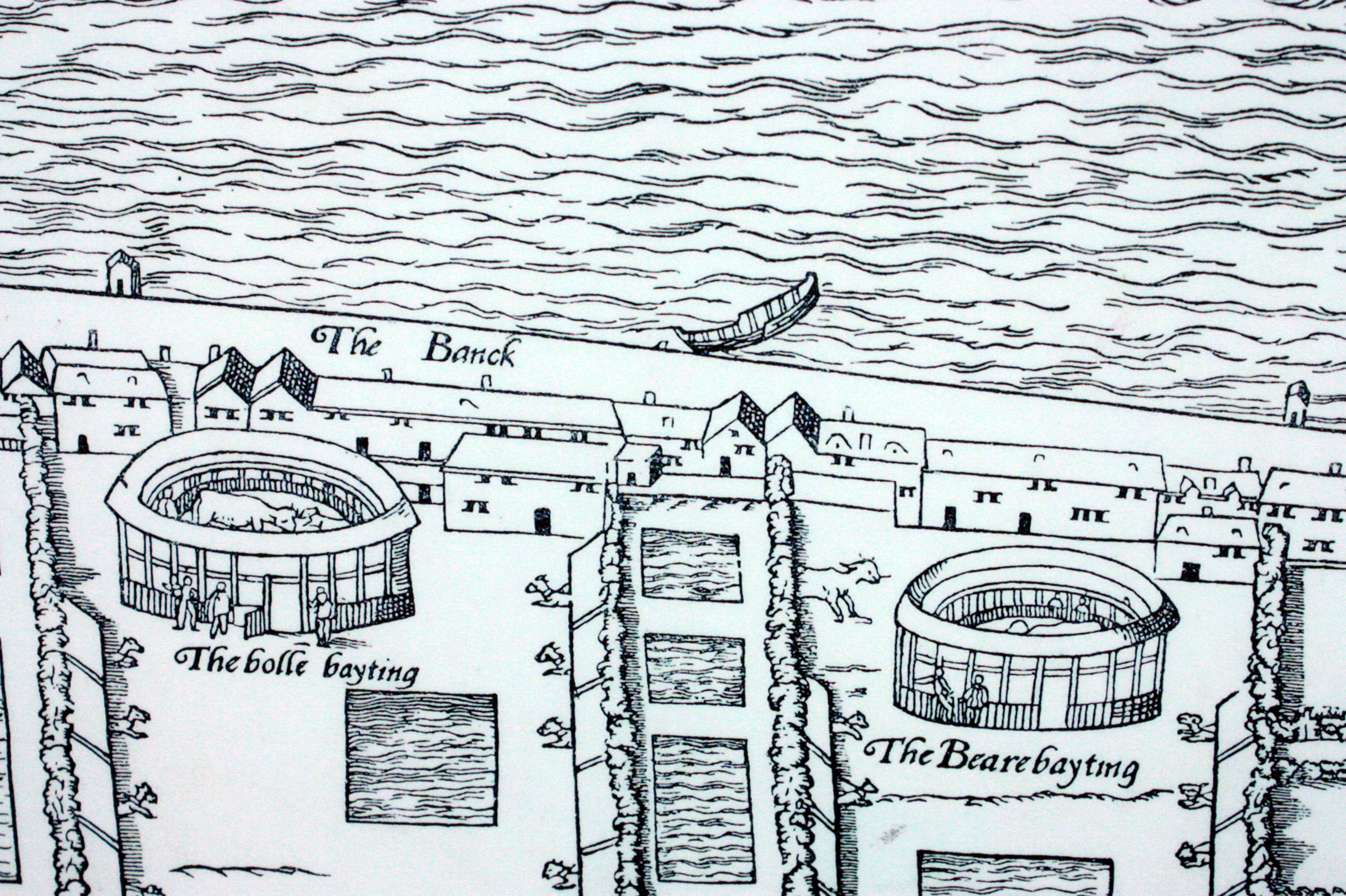
Bull- and bear-baiting arenas shown on the woodcut map of London of c.–1561 (the dogs are shown coming out of pens to each side)

The origin of baiting in England may have come from ancient pagan rituals, and appears to have been carried on as a required method of butchering bull-beef in the 14th century. However, the earliest known bull-baiting as commercial entertainment in London was around 1540, and the first permanent arena was in 1562. Historically, however, English authors have often claimed a more ancient origin of the sport, as early as the 12th century, presumably to lend it a more ancient and venerable history, going as far as to suggest that the circular shape of the Elizabethan theatres came about because they were first used as baiting arenas, although these claims have been discredited.

Crowds in London during the Royal Entry of James VI and I in March 1604 were entertained by bull-baiting. During the time of Queen Anne, bull-baiting was practiced in London at Hockley-in-the-Hole, twice a week – and was also reasonably common in provincial towns, for instance at Birmingham's Bull Ring. At Tutbury, a bull was tied to an iron stake so that it could move within a radius of about 30 feet (9 m). The object of the sport was for the dogs to immobilize the bull.

Before the event started, the bull's nose was blown full of pepper to enrage it before the baiting. The bull was often placed in a hole in the ground. A variant of bull-baiting was "pinning the bull", where specially-trained dogs would set upon the bull one at a time, a successful attack resulting in the dog fastening his teeth strongly in the bull's snout. The extinct Old English Bulldog was specially bred for this sport.

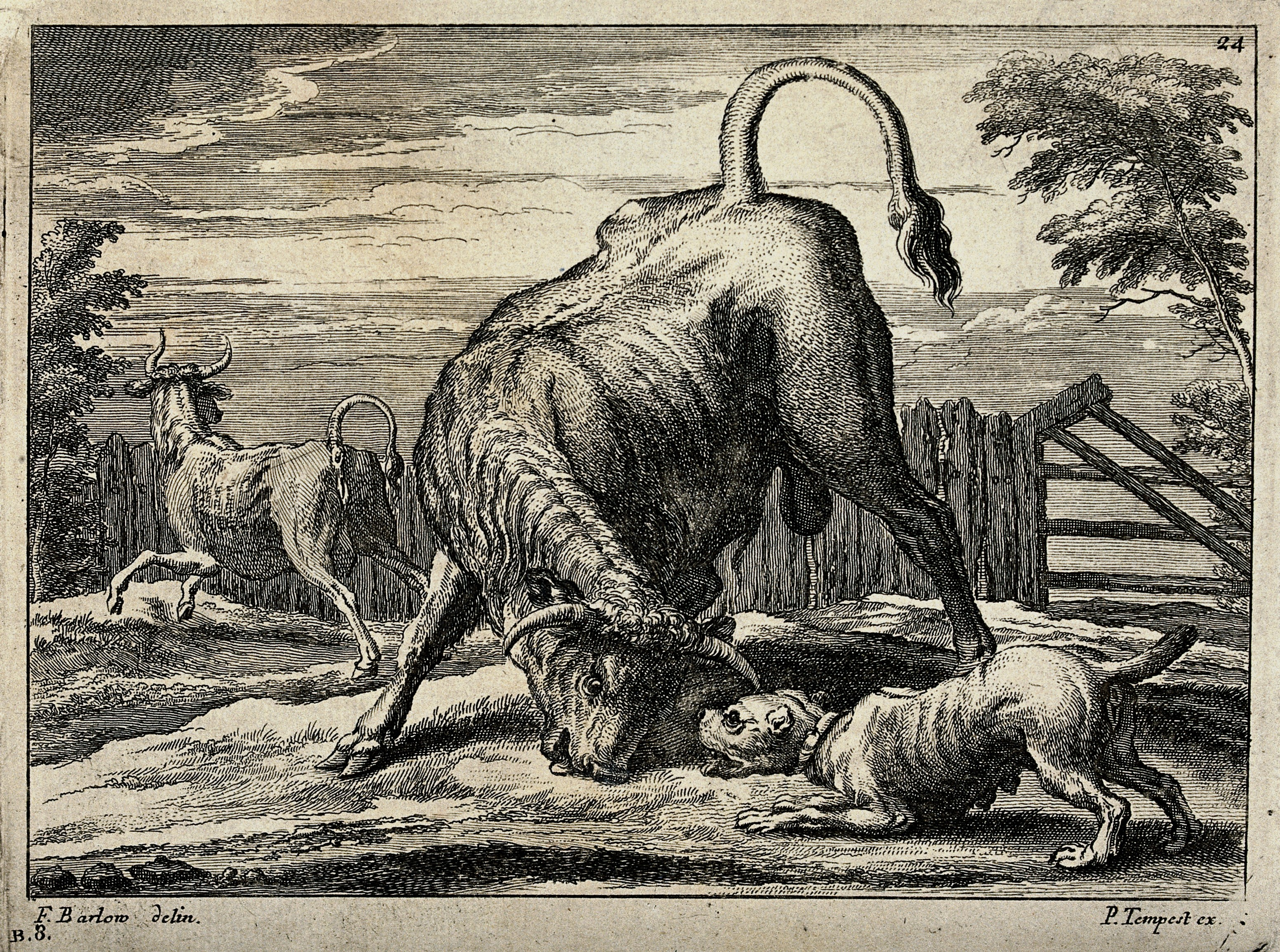
Etching by Francis Barlow

Bull-baiting was not only practiced as a form of recreation; there was a long-held belief that baiting improved the meat quality and tenderness when consumed. By the early nineteenth century, the sport began to die out, both because the baiting caused a public nuisance and because of new concerns about animal cruelty.

The Bull Baiting at Wokingham was advertised in the newspaper in 1774:

BULL BAITING. On Wednesday next, being St. Thomas's Day, Two Bulls will be baited in the Market-Place, Wokingham, which will be run for, a very handsome MOROCCO COLLAR, stitched with Silver, and a Silver Plate for a Label, of a Guinea and Half Value. Each Dog is to be let three Times at the first Bull, four Times at the second, and only one Dog run at a Time. The Owner of each Dog that runs, pays One Shilling for Entrance. Proper Judges will be appointed before running to determine who may be the Winner, A good Ordinary at the King's Inn, between the Times of Baiting the Bulls.

Bull baiting advertised in 1780 appears to indicate that it was organized by a local hostelry:

NOTICE IS HEREBY GIVEN, THAT an exceeding good BULL will be baited on Wednesday the 27th day of December 1780, near the DOG and STAR at Alresford, (Note: Either New Alresford, a town, or Old Alresford, a village; it is unclear which.) Hants, when and where a dinner will be given gratis to every person that shall produce a good bull-dog; likewise a Silver Collar of twenty-four shillings value, to the owner of the dog that shall pin the bull oftenest and fairest, and seven shillings and sixpence to the owner of the second best dog. But if none shall pin him, seven and sixpence will be given to the owner of the best, and five shillings to the owner of the second dog. N.B. No dog will be allowed to run unless produced at the place before ten o'clock in the forenoon.

By the early 19th century, baiting had fallen out of favour, to the point that it was reviewed disparagingly in Strutt's Sports and Pastimes of the People of England (1801): "[bull-baiting is] attended only by the lowest and most despicable part of the people." A bill for the suppression of the practice was introduced into the House of Commons in 1800 by Sir William Pulteney. The bill was defeated by a one-vote margin. A second bill was introduced in 1802 by John Dent, but was defeated by thirteen votes. Bull baiting was still taking place, a newspaper reported in 1818 that a bull being taken from the stake to a stable had killed a man at Bilston Wake. Bulls were excluded from the protections afforded to other cattle in the Cruel Treatment of Cattle Act 1822. Bull-baiting was not finally outlawed until Parliament passed the Cruelty to Animals Act 1835, which forbade the keeping of any house, pit, or other places for baiting or fighting any bull, bear, dog, or other animals.

=== Ireland ===
Bull-baiting (Irish: tarbh-ghríosú) was widespread in Ireland in the 17th–19th centuries.

In Dublin, bull-baiting took place near the Cornmarket and in Smithfield. On Saint Stephen's Day 1789, a riot followed a bull-bait: soldiers fired on the crowd and four were killed.

In Wexford, the activity arrived in 1621, brought by the Guild of Butchers. Bulls were baited twice a year and their hides presented to the Mayor. The area where bull-baiting took place is still called the Bullring.

In Kilkenny it took place at the site called The Ring, first in 1609, and commonly on the feast-day of John the Baptist (December 27). The last recorded bull-bait was in 1837, after they had become illegal under an 1835 Act.

Bull-baiting also took place in Waterford, Naas, Drogheda, Tuam, Carrickfergus, Belfast and Athlone.

=== North America ===
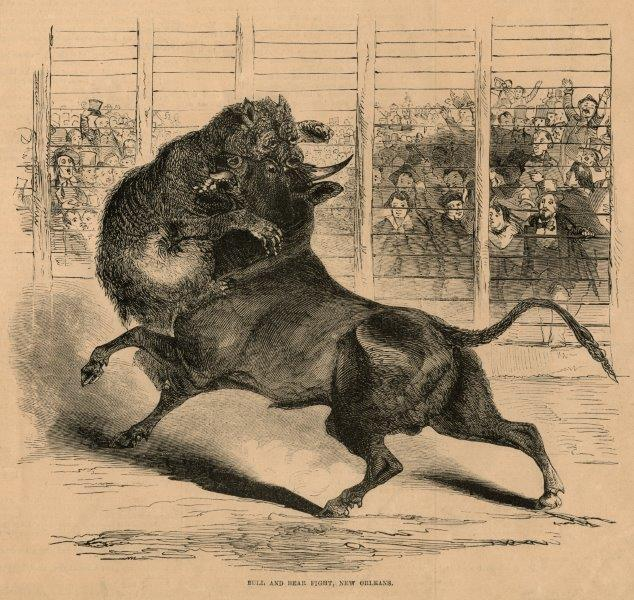
A bull and bear fighting in New Orleans, 1853.

In the 19th century, and during Spanish Colonial Rule, bulls used to be pitted against bears in California and Mexico. Kingsley (1920) said that the bulls that fought the bears, at least while California was part of the United States, were not domesticated Hereford bulls, but Spanish Fighting Bulls, whose weight, agility, speed, sharp horns, and hot temper were said to be dangerous to both bears and humans, and Wistar (1937) said that those bulls were fearless. In a case of the bull winning, victory could come early, when the bull used its strength to gore the bear to death with its horns, or toss the bear into the air.

=== Dogs in bull baiting ===
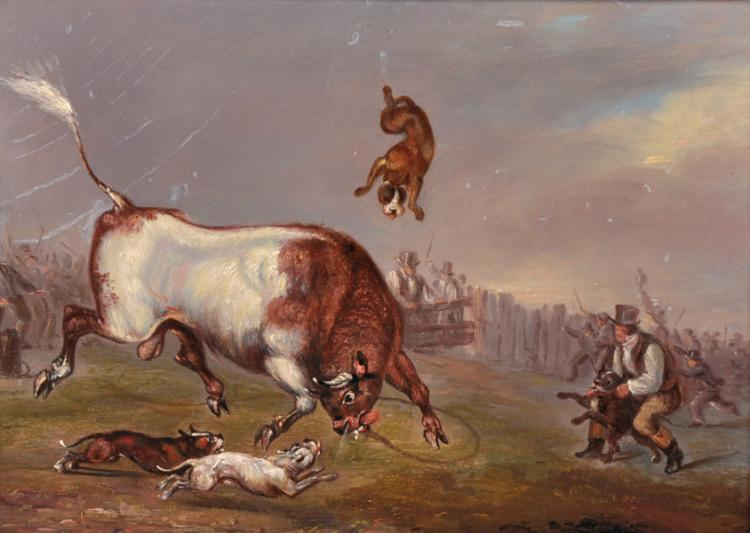
Bull-baiting with dogs, 19th century

Bull-baiting dogs, including Old English Bulldogs, Bullenbeissers, Spanish Bulldogs, Ca de Bous and bull and terriers, were bred to bait animals, mainly bulls and bears. During bull-baiting, the dog would attempt to flatten itself to the ground, creeping as close to the bull as possible, then darting out and attempting to bite the bull in the nose or head area. The bull would often be tethered by a collar and rope, which were staked into the ground. As the dog darted at the bull, the bull would attempt to catch the dog with his head and horns, and throw the dog into the air.

In 1835, the Cruelty to Animals Act was passed in Parliament that outlawed "Blood Sport" in the United Kingdom. The bulldog's work was suddenly over and the bulldog rapidly started dying out. Around 1865, dog fanciers began developing dog clubs which eventually culminated into conformation shows. Many fanciers utilized various remnants of the dog utilized for "Blood Sport" to resurrect the "Bull" dog and ultimately developed today's modern English bulldog.

== In literature ==
Washington Irving, in his 1837 book, The Adventures of Captain Bonneville, wrote that a bear was baited, and likewise, a wild, fierce bull, before they were brought by vaqueros to an arena in a small amphitheatre in Monterey, California, to fight each other. He called the fight "a favorite, though barbarous sport." In this case, he said that the bear used its sharp claws against the nose of the bull, before catching its tongue, after being repeatedly gored by the bull. Then the bull overturned it "with a desperate effort", and then "dispatched" it rather easily.

Charles Dickens refers to bull-baiting in a figurative sense in Great Expectations (1860-1861), when the character, Joe, angrily warns the lawyer, Mr. Jaggers: "if you come into my place bull-baiting and badgering me, come out!"

== See also ==
- Badger-baiting
- Beargarden
- List of dog fighting breeds
- Bull running
- Bullfighting
- Stamford bull run
