= Clerkenwell Road =

Street in London

Coordinates: 51.523°N 0.106°W

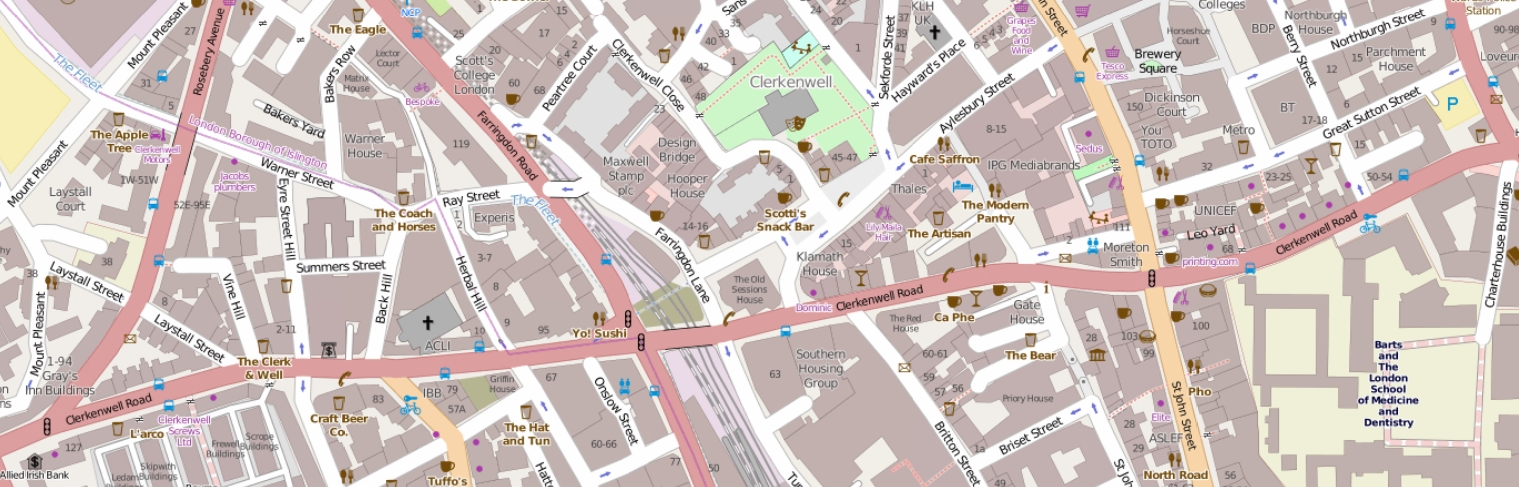
The immediate vicinity of Clerkenwell Road

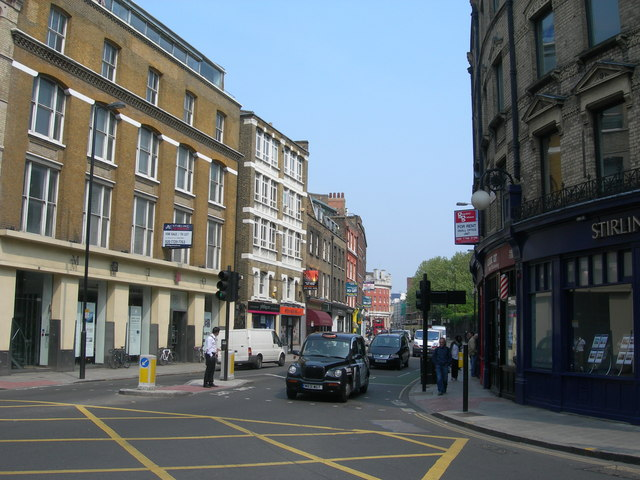
Clerkenwell Road, at the St John Street crossroads

Clerkenwell Road is a street in London.

It runs west–east from Gray's Inn Road in the west, to Goswell Road in the east. Its continuation at either end is Theobald's Road and Old Street respectively.

Clerkenwell Road and Theobalds Road were constructed by the Metropolitan Board of Works in 1874–78 as the central portion of an intended cross-capital arterial road, linking the West End and East End.

The road is served by London Bus routes 55, 243 and night route N55.

The Columbia Graphophone Company established its headquarters and studios in Victorian warehouses at 102-108 Clerkenwell Road shortly before the First World War, and the buildings were a key location in the development of the British recording industry until the 1930s.

== See also ==
- Hockley-in-the-Hole
