= Paris Garden =

Historic liberty in London

Coordinates: 51.5056°N 0.1059°W

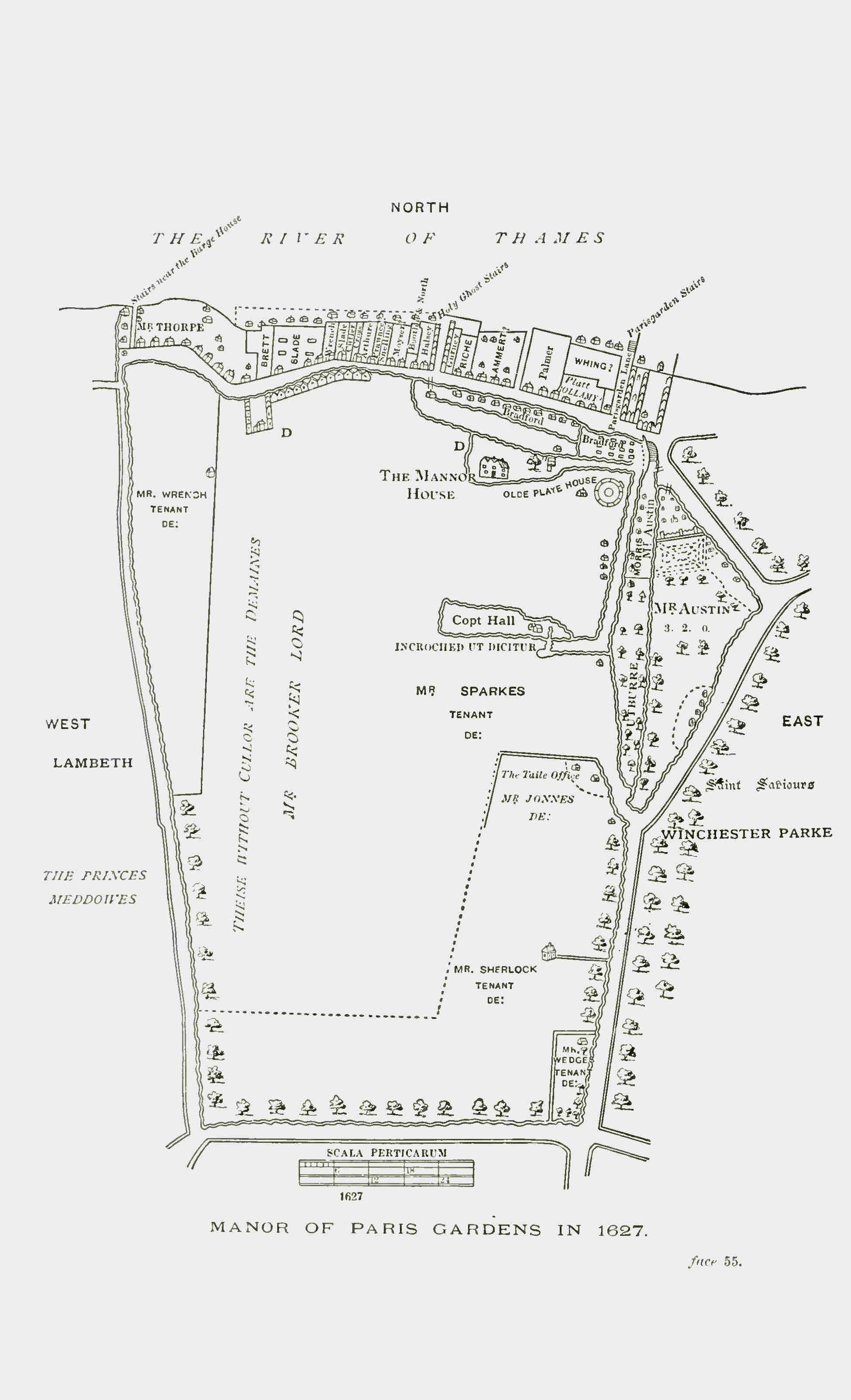
Map of Paris Garden in 1627

Paris Garden, Paris Gardens, or Paris Gardens Manor was an area and later liberty in what is today Southwark. It was originally a marshy wetland outside the limits of London and would remain flood-prone until adequate waterworks were completed in the early 19th century.

The area was owned by the Knights Templar in the 12th century and after their dissolution came into the hands of the Knight's Hospitaller. In the 16th and 17th centuries the area was used as a bear garden, and was a popular site for bearbaiting being described as such in a 1550 poem by Robert Crowley.

== Name ==
The name is said to originate from a "Robert de Parys" or "Paris", a greengrocer and ship owner, who owned a manor and managed its lands there in 1390. He was also the marshal of the nearby prison of Marshalsea from 1384 to 1392. Some, like the English antiquarian William Rendle (1811–1893), disagree with this explanation and instead ascribe the name Paris Garden to a misspelling, not unusual at the time due to the lack of standardized spelling. This theory posits that the name originated from "Parish Garden".

The manor house of Wideflete aka Paris Garden lay on the riverbank. To the east, it bordered the lands of the Bishop of Winchester and Southwark Borough. To the west, it bordered Lambeth and a remote portion of Kennington Manor, partly marked by a ditch. To the south, it bordered property owned by Bermondsey Abbey.
