= Bear-baiting =

Blood sport with bears

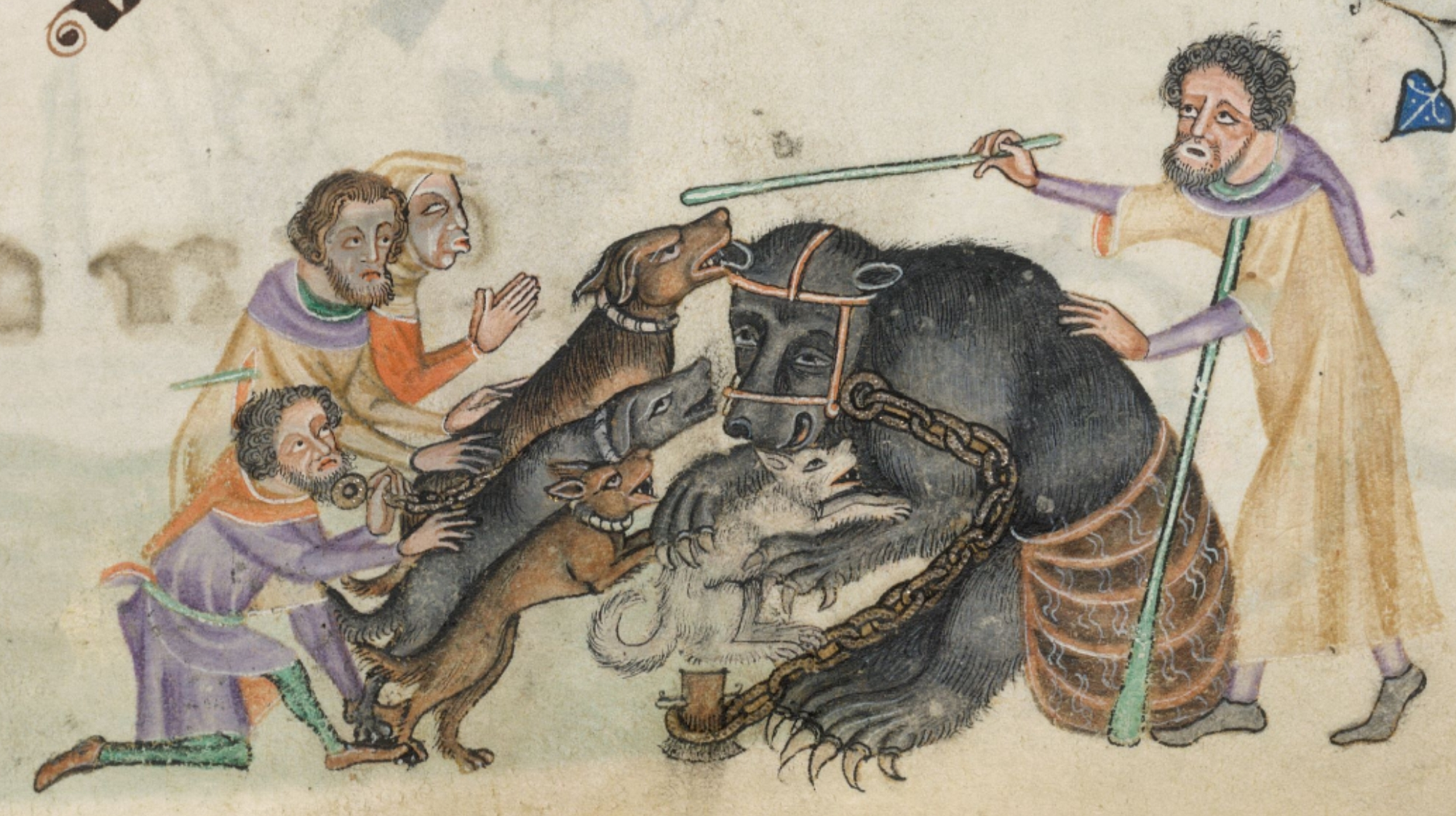
Bear-baiting in the 14th century

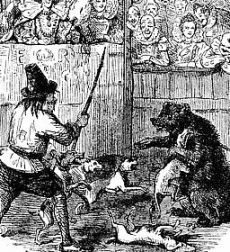
Bear-baiting in the 17th century

Bear-baiting was a historical blood sport in which a chained bear and one or more dogs were forced to fight one another. It also sometimes involved pitting a bear against another animal. Until the 19th century, it was commonly performed in Great Britain, Sweden, India, Pakistan, and Mexico among others.

Today, "bear-baiting" most commonly refers to the practice of using edible bait to lure bears into an area for hunting. Bear-baiting in all forms has been subject to controversy and debate among animal rights advocates for centuries.

== History ==
=== Europe ===
==== Great Britain ====
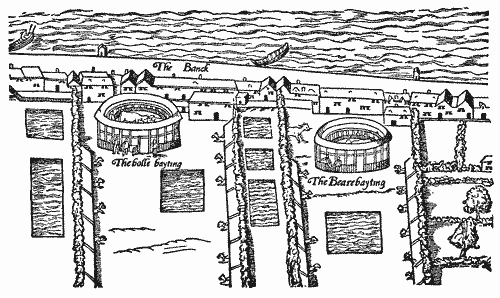
Bear and bull-baiting rings, Bankside, c.1560

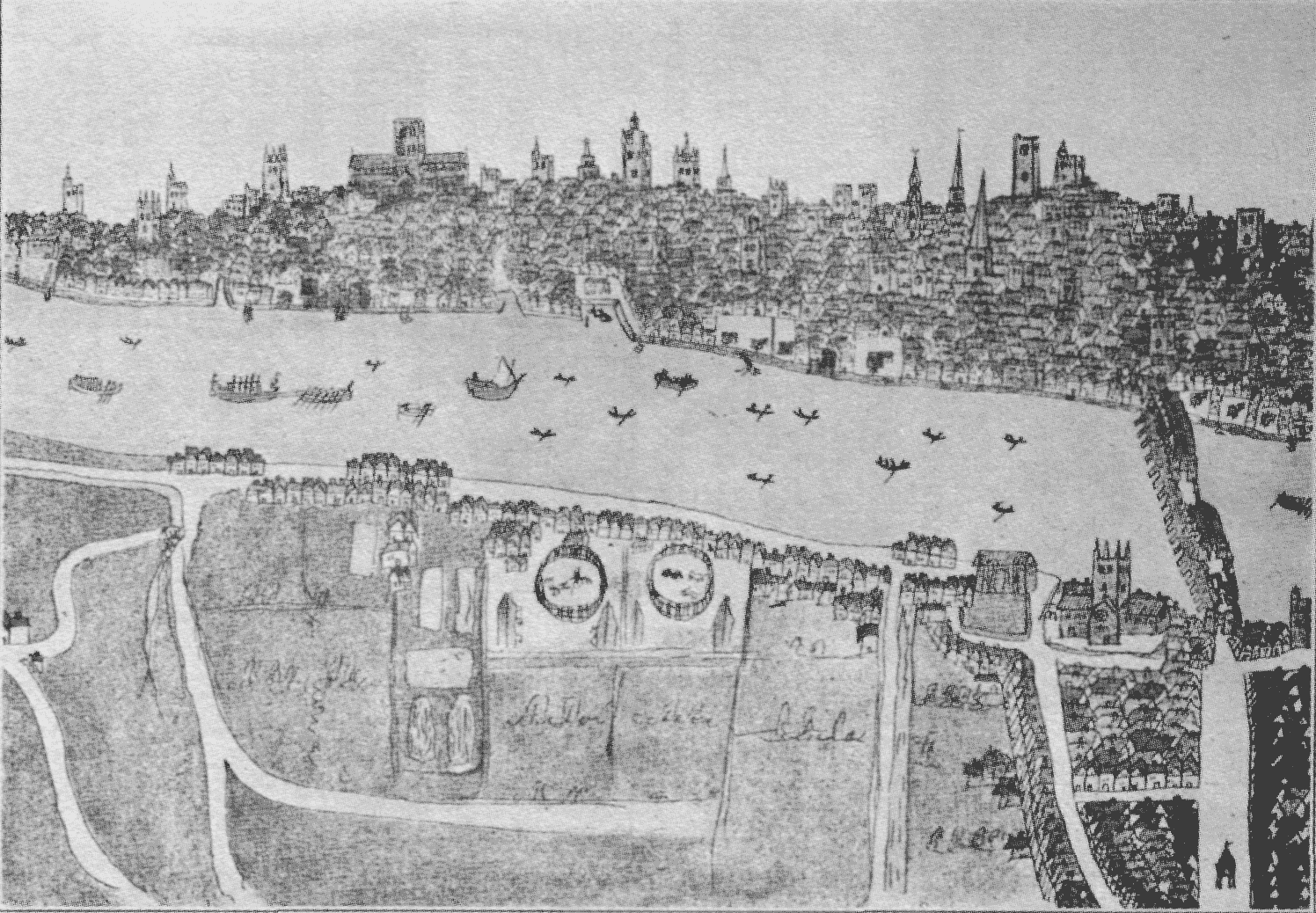
Amphitheatres for animal-baiting at Bankside, from William Smith's the Description of England, c. 1580

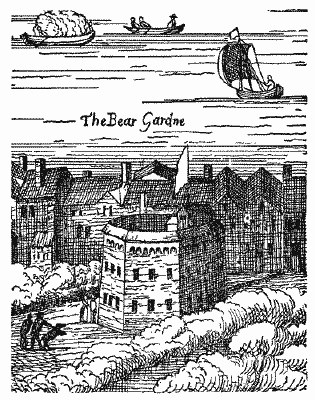
The Bear garden, Bankside, sometime before 1616

Bear-baiting was very popular from the 12th until the 19th century. From the 16th century, many bears were maintained for baiting. In its best-known form, arenas for this purpose were called bear-gardens, consisting of a circular high fenced area, the "pit", and raised seating for spectators. A post would be set in the ground towards the edge of the pit and the bear chained to it, either by the leg or neck. Several well-trained fighting or baiting dogs, usually Old English Bulldogs, would then be set on it, being replaced as they got tired or were wounded or killed. In some cases the bear was let loose, allowing it to chase after animals or people. For a long time, the main bear-garden in London was the Paris Garden, a section of the Bankside lying to the west of The Clink, at Southwark.

Henry VIII was a fan and had a bear pit constructed at his Palace of Whitehall. Elizabeth I was also fond of the entertainment; it featured regularly in her tours. When an attempt was made to ban bear-baiting on Sundays, she overruled Parliament. Robert Laneham's letter describes the spectacle presented by Robert Dudley, Earl of Leicester at Kenilworth Castle in 1575:

Thursday, the fourteenth of July, and the sixth day of her Majesty are coming, a great sort of bandogs [mastiff] was then tied in the outer court and thirteen bears in the inner ...

Well, the bears were brought forth into the court, the dogs set to them, to argue the points even face to face. They had learned counsel also on both parts, what may they be counted partial that are retained but to one side? I know not. Very fierce, both one and the other, and eager in an argument. If the dog in pleading would pluck the bear by the throat, the bear with traverse would claw him again by the scalp, confess and a list, but avoid it could not that was bound to the bar, and his counsel told him that it could be to him no policy in pleading.

Therefore, with fending and proving, with plucking and tugging, scratching and biting, by plain tooth and nail on one side and the other, such expense of blood and leather [skin] was there between them, as a month licking (I think) will not recover, and yet remain as far out as ever they were.

It was a very pleasant sport, of these beasts, to see the bear with his pink eyes leering after his enemies approach, the nimbleness and wayt [wait] of the dog to take his advantage, and the force and experience of the bear again to avoid the assaults. If he were bitten in one place, how he would pinch in another to get free, that if he were taken once, then what shift, with biting, with clawing, with roaring, tossing and tumbling, he would work to wind himself free from them. And when he was loose, to shake his ears twice or thrice with the blood and the slather about his physiognomy, was a matter of goodly relief.

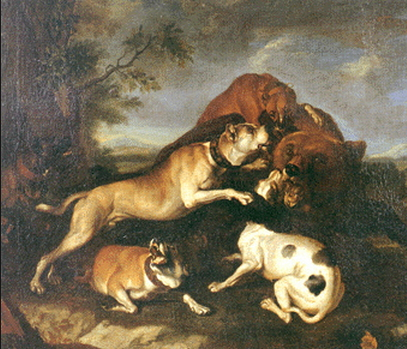
A painting of about 1650 by Abraham Hondius of a bear-baiting

Variations involved other animals being baited, especially bulls. Bull-baiting was a contest which was similar to bear baiting in which the bull was chained to a stake by one hind leg or by the neck and worried by dogs. The whipping of a blinded bear was another variation of bear-baiting. Also, on one curious occasion, a pony with an ape tied to its back was baited; a spectator described that "... with the screaming of the ape, beholding the curs hanging from the ears and neck of the pony, is very laughable".

Attempts to end the entertainment were first made in the Kingdom of England by the Puritans, with little effect. The deaths of several spectators, when a stand collapsed at the Paris Gardens on 12 January 1583, was viewed by early Puritans as a sign of God's anger, though not primarily because of the cruelty but because the bear-baiting was taking place on a Sunday. One bear named Sackerson was written into the Shakespearean comedy The Merry Wives of Windsor.

Baiting was banned by the Puritans during the Wars of the Three Kingdoms and the resultant Commonwealth of England, Scotland, and Ireland, which ended in 1660. By the late 17th century, "the conscience of cultivated people seems to have been touched" and, by the 18th century, bear-baiting had largely died out in Britain; the cost of importing bears for blood sports having become prohibitively high. It was not until 1835 that baiting was prohibited by the Parliament of the United Kingdom in the Cruelty to Animals Act 1835, introduced as a bill by the member of parliament for South Durham, Joseph Pease, who was a Quaker and a member of the committee of the Society for the Prevention of Cruelty to Animals. The Act, which also banned (but failed to eradicate) dog fighting and cockfighting, was soon extended across the Empire. At that time, the "bull stone" of Leslie, Fife was first recorded in the New Statistical Account of Scotland as an item which had already fallen out of use. It is a large stone to which bulls and occasionally bears were tied before being baited.

==== Sweden ====
In the 18th century, King Frederick I of Sweden was said to have been presented with a "very large lion" from the Barbary people, which then killed a bear after the king pitted them together in a fight.

=== Asia ===
==== India ====
In India, towards the end of the 19th century, Gaekwad Sayajirao III of Baroda arranged a fight between a Barbary lion and Bengal tiger, to determine whether the lion or tiger should be called the "King of the Cat Family." The victor then had to face a Sierran Grizzly bear weighing over 1,500.0 lb (680.4 kilograms), after the Gaekwad was told that the cat was not the "King of Carnivorae."

==== Pakistan ====
Bear baiting has been occurring in the Punjab and Sindh provinces of Pakistan, since 2004. The events are organized predominantly by local gangsters who own the fighting dogs.

During the event the bear will be tethered to a rope 2.0–5.0 m (6.6–16.4 feet) long in the centre of an arena to prevent escape. Bears' canine teeth are often removed and their claws may be filed down giving them less advantage over the dogs. Each fight lasts around three minutes. If the dogs pull the bear to the ground they are said to win the fight. Bears usually have to undergo several fights during each day's event.

Bears are illegally sourced by poaching. Asian black bears and brown bears are known to be poached in Pakistan and used in bear baiting. Asiatic black bears are listed as vulnerable on the World Conservation Union's (IUCN's) Red List of Threatened Animals. The capture of bear cubs is prohibited across three provinces of Pakistan by: the North West Frontier Province Conservation and Management Act (1975); the Punjab Wildlife Protection, Preservation, Conservation and Management Act (1974); and the Sindh Wildlife Protection Ordinance (1972).

Bear baiting was banned in Pakistan by the Prevention of Cruelty to Animals Act (1890). Pakistan's wildlife authorities are working with animal welfare groups to eradicate the events, with some success. The Bioresource Research Centre, a Pakistani wildlife group working to end bear-baiting, uses Islamic teachings to encourage mosques in areas where baiting occurs, to add an anti-cruelty message to their Friday Khuṭbah (Arabic: خُـطْـبَـة, Sermon). Depending on the context, though the Quran does not directly forbid the baiting of animals, there are restrictions on how people can treat them, and it is outlawed in certain hadiths.

Kund Park Sanctuary was opened in 2000 by World Animal Protection to provide a home for bears confiscated by the wildlife authorities and NGOs working to eradicate bear baiting in Pakistan. However, during the 2010 Pakistan floods Kund Park was destroyed and all but three of the 23 bears there died. The survivors were moved to a newly constructed sanctuary in Balkasar Bear Sanctuary.

=== North America ===
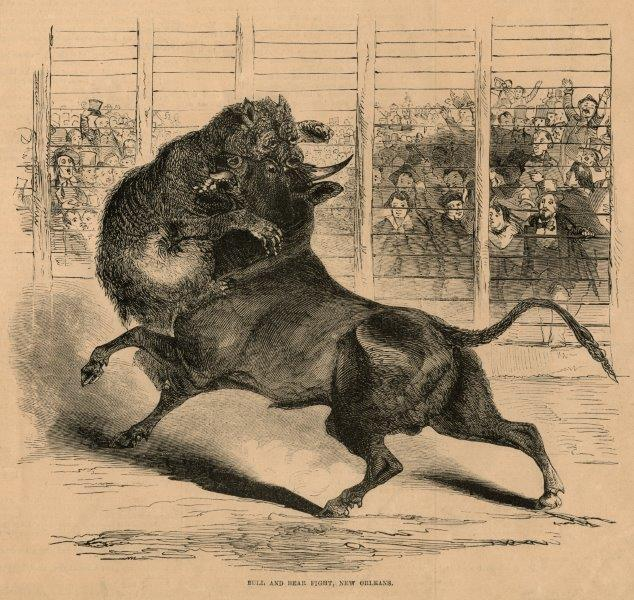
A bear and bull fight in New Orleans, 1853

==== United States ====
As recently as 2010, illegal bear-baiting was practiced publicly in South Carolina. All such public exhibitions have been shut down as of 2013.

In the 19th century and during Mexican and earlier Spanish colonial rule, fights had been organized in California, which had a subspecies of brown bear of its own. In a case of the bear winning, the bear would use its teeth to catch a bull between its horns, on its nose, which would allow the bear to move its head enough to twist its neck, or bite a part of the bull's body, like the tongue, or use its paws to catch or harm the bull, like in squeezing its neck, or catching its tongue:

- According to Cahuilla people, who claimed to be able to communicate with bears, one of their men attended a fight at a pueblo in Los Angeles. During the first part of the fight, the bull kept knocking down the bear, before the man whispered to the bear that it had to defend itself, or else it would be killed. Upon that, the bear fought back, and broke the bull's neck.

==== Mexico ====
Storer and Trevis (1955) mentioned the account of Albert Evans, who said that he saw an uncommon incident at a Plaza de Toros in Veracruz, Mexico, in January 1870. A bear called 'Samson' dug a hole so large that it could hold an elephant, before using its large paws to carry and throw an opposing bull headfirst into the hole, paw-swipe its side till its breath appeared to have been half-knocked out of its body, and then use one paw to hold the bull, and the other to bury it alive.

== Hunting bears with bait ==
The term "bear baiting" may be also used for the hunting practice of luring a bear with bait to an arranged killing spot. The hunter places an amount of food, such as raw meat or sweets, every day at a given spot until the hunter notices the food is being taken each day, accompanied by bear tracks. He then chooses a day to await the bear, killing it when it arrives to feed. In 2007, such bear baiting was legal in many states in the United States, with the Humane Society of the United States reporting that:

Bear baiting is banned in 18 of the 28 states that allow bear hunting. It persists... in Alaska, Idaho, Maine, Michigan, Minnesota, New Hampshire, Utah, Wisconsin, and Wyoming. For instance, in Wisconsin in 2002, hunters killed 2,415 bears; those using bait accounted for 1,720 of the kills. In Maine, hunters killed 3,903 bears in 2001, and baiters took 3,173 of the animals.

=== Alaska ===
Bear-baiting in Alaska is currently legal under the 2020 hunting reform. Bait, often human or dog food, is left at bait stations which must be registered with the Alaska Department of Fish and Game. These bait stations are then monitored by hunters using tree stands and game cameras. Bear-baiting was prohibited in 2015 by the National Park Service. It was once again legalized in 2020 due to conflicts between the National Park Service hunting regulations and the state hunting regulations. As of January 9, 2023, the National Park Service has proposed to reinstate the 2015 regulations due to safety concerns and public backlash with 99% public opposition to the 2020 repeal.

== In literature ==
Washington Irving, in his 1837 book, The Adventures of Captain Bonneville, wrote that a bear was baited, and likewise, a wild, fierce bull, before they were brought by vaqueros to an arena in a small amphitheatre in Monterey, California, to fight each other. He called the fight "a favorite, though barbarous sport." In this case, he said that the bear used its sharp claws against the nose of the bull, before catching its tongue, after being repeatedly gored by the bull. Then the bull overturned it "with a desperate effort", and then "dispatched" it rather easily.

Charles Dickens refers to bull-baiting in a figurative sense in Great Expectations (1860-1861), when the character, Joe, angrily warns the lawyer, Mr. Jaggers: "if you come into my place bull-baiting and badgering me, come out!"

== See also ==
- Bear hunting
- Beargarden
- Bear-leader
- Badger-baiting
- Bull-baiting
- Baiting (blood sport) (includes dog-baiting)
- Category:Dog fighting breeds
- Cockfight
- Congleton, an English town once notorious for bear-baiting and cockfighting
- Hope Theatre
- Lion-baiting
- List of dog fighting breeds
- Speciesism
