= List of eponymous roads in London =

The following is a partial list of eponymous roads in London – that is, roads named after people – with notes on the link between the road and the person. Examples of reigning monarchs, Prime Ministers etc. with no inherent geographic link are omitted or kept to one example as there are many streets named "Victoria + descriptor" and "Wellington + descriptor" for example.

== Roads and streets ==
Road	Borough(s)	Named after	Comments	Coordinates
Addison: Road, Avenue, Crescent, Gardens, Upper Gardens and Lower Gardens	Hammersmith and Fulham and Kensington and Chelsea	Joseph Addison	English essayist, poet, playwright and politician (1672–1719) who married the widow of the 3rd Earl of Holland, owner of the estate	51.5025°N 0.2093°W
Adler Street	Tower Hamlets	Nathan Marcus Adler	Chief Rabbi of Great Britain 1845–1890	51.5157°N 0.0674°W
Agnes Gardens and Aylmer Road	Barking and Dagenham	Agnes de Valence	Long-term rented Valence House with her brother Aymer de Valence, 2nd Earl of Pembroke in the fourteenth century on the north side of the road	51.5529°N 0.1319°E
Ailsa Road and Ailsa Avenue	Richmond upon Thames	Archibald Kennedy, 1st Marquess of Ailsa	Bought a house called St Margaret's near the site of the road, which later would give its name to the area	51.4595°N 0.321°W
Albany Street	Camden	Frederick, Duke of York and Albany	Younger brother of George IV, in whose reign the street was built	51.5303°N 0.1447°W
Albemarle Street	Westminster	Christopher Monck, 2nd Duke of Albemarle	Previous owner of the property on which the road was built in 1683–4	51.5091°N 0.1421°W
Albert Embankment	Lambeth	Prince Albert	Consort of Queen Victoria. The Embankment was built between 1866 and 1869, under the direction of Joseph Bazalgette.	51.4910°N 0.1225°W
Alleyn Park and Alleyn Road	Southwark	Edward Alleyn	Actor and founder of Dulwich College, near the north end of the road, in whose chapel he is now buried	51.4346°N 0.086°W
Anna Neagle Close	Newham	Anna Neagle	Actress and singer born in the local area	51.5536°N 0.024°E
Ayres Street	Southwark	Alice Ayres	Nursemaid who died saving three children from a fire at 194 Union Street, Borough, in April 1885. Commemorated on the Memorial to Heroic Self-Sacrifice at Postman's Park. The street (formerly White Cross Street) was renamed in her honour in 1936.	51.504°N 0.100°W
Argyll Road (/ɑːrˈɡaɪəl/)	Kensington and Chelsea	George Campbell, 8th Duke of Argyll	Lived at Argyll Lodge, a former house on Campden Hill nearby	51.5013°N 0.1964°W
Attlee Road, Ayles Road, Bevin Road, Bondfield Avenue, Keir Hardie Way, Morrison Road and Webbs Road	Hillingdon	Clement Attlee, Walter Ayles, Ernest Bevin, Margaret Bondfield, Keir Hardie, Herbert Morrison, Sidney Webb and Beatrice Webb	Cluster of short roads in Yeading originally formed of social housing named after Labour politicians. Attlee: Labour Party leader (1935–1955) and Prime Minister (1945–1951). Ayles: Labour MP for Southall (1945–1950); then for Hayes and Harlington (1950–1953). Bevin: Foreign Secretary (1945–1951). Bondfield: MP, trades unionist and women's rights activist. Hardie: First Labour MP. Morrison: Transport Secretary (1929–1931), Home Secretary (1940–1945) and Deputy Prime Minister (1945–1951). Webbs: prominent social reformers.	51.5318°N 0.4061°W
Babmaes Street	Westminster	Baptist May	Courtier to King Charles II, who lived in nearby St James's Palace	51.5086°N 0.1348°W
Baker Street	Westminster	William Baker	Builder who laid the street out in the 18th century	51.5200°N 0.1566°W
Barnardo Street and Barnardo Gardens	Tower Hamlets	Dr Thomas John Barnardo	Founded a boy's orphanage in Stepney Causeway adjoining in 1870	51.512°N 0.0472°W
Barry Road	Southwark	Charles Barry	Architect and surveyor to the Dulwich College Estate from 1830 to 1858, after whom the road was named in 1867	51.4539°N 0.07°W
Baylis Road	Lambeth	Lilian Baylis (1874–1937)	Theatrical producer and manager of the Old Vic Theatre on the road. In the Waterloo part of Lambeth. Previously Oakley Street.	51.50051°N 0.11091°W
Beauchamp Place (trad. /ˈbiːtʃəm/)	Kensington and Chelsea	Edward Seymour, Viscount Beauchamp	Beauchamp Place, on the site of the road, was also a 16th-century mansion of the Seymour family, whose titles included Viscount Beauchamp.	51.4977°N 0.1650°W
Betjeman Close	Harrow	Sir John Betjeman	Writer and Poet Laureate whose documentary film, Metro-Land, includes scenes shot in Pinner, near the location of the street.	51.5904°N 0.3678°W
Bellot Street	Greenwich	Joseph René Bellot	French sailor and Arctic explorer who disappeared, and has a memorial in Greenwich	51.488°N 0.0052°E
Black Prince Road	Lambeth	Edward the Black Prince	Son of King Edward III	51.4920°N 0.1200°W
Blondin Avenue and Niagara Avenue	Ealing	Charles Blondin	Tightrope walker and acrobat, who lived and died at nearby Niagara House in Northfields. Commemorates Niagara Falls where Blondin performed his most famous tightrope walk in 1859.	51.4978°N 0.3148°W
Bob Marley Way	Lambeth	Bob Marley	Jamaican singer-songwriter and musician, one of the most widely known performers of reggae music. Brixton.	51.4592°N 0.1090°W
Bolingbroke Grove	Wandsworth	Henry St John, 1st Viscount St John (also known as Viscount Bolingbroke)	Owner of the land on which the road was later built, and buried in St Mary's Church, Battersea	51.4543°N 0.1677°W
Bond Street	Westminster	Sir Thomas Bond	Property developer of Bond Street, Dover Street and Albemarle Street, from 1683	51.5126°N 0.1448°W
Boutflower Road	Wandsworth	Henry Boutflower Verdon	First vicar-designate of the then new St Mark's Church, past which the road runs. He died, young, in 1879, seven years before the construction of the road.	51.46071°N 0.17002°W
Bouverie Street	City of London	Earls of Radnor	The Pleydell-Bouveries, Earls of Radnor, were landlords of this area.	51.51345°N 0.10796°W
Browning Close, Robert Close and Elizabeth Close	Westminster	Robert Browning and Elizabeth Barrett Browning	Poet who lived in Little Venice, near the site of the road. Elizabeth was one of the most prominent English poets of the Victorian era and his wife.	51.5247°N 0.1792°W
Brunel Road (/bruːˈnɛl/)	Southwark	Marc Isambard Brunel	The road is situated near the south end of Thames Tunnel, which the engineer Brunel built.	51.5004°N 0.0525°W
Buller Road, Hamilton Road, Hunter Road, Kitchener Road and Milner Road	Croydon	Sir Redvers Henry Buller, Sir Ian Hamilton, Sir Archibald Hunter, Herbert Kitchener, 1st Earl Kitchener and Alfred Milner, 1st Viscount Milner	Cluster of roads in Thornton Heath named after figures in the Second Boer War. Buller: Commander-in-Chief of British Forces in South Africa in the Second Boer War and Victoria Cross recipient. Hamilton, Hunter and Kitchener: Commanders during the Second Boer War. Milner: Governor of Cape Colony and High Commissioner for Southern Africa.	
Burlington Lane, Burlington Road and Burlington Gardens	Hounslow	Richard Boyle, 3rd Earl of Burlington	Builder of Chiswick House, in its park adjacent to the road	51.4824°N 0.2596°W
Bute Avenue	Richmond upon Thames	John Stuart, 3rd Earl of Bute	Ranger of Richmond Park, near the road, from 1761 until 1792. Petersham.	51.44377°N 0.30059°W
Bowen Road, Butler Road, Drury Road, Vaughan Road, Sumner Road, Heath Road	Harrow	Headmasters and teachers of Harrow School	Cluster of streets named after teachers and headmasters of school: Edward Ernest Bowen (c.1885–1901) – author of the Harrow school song, Forty Years On; Montagu Butler: (1859–1885); Charles Vaughan: (1845–1859); Joseph Drury (1785–1805); Benjamin Heath (1771–1785); Robert Carey Sumner (1760–1771)	51.5781°N 0.3493°W
Cade Road	Greenwich	Jack Cade	Leader of a popular revolt against the government in 1450, which took place on Blackheath, near where the road now stands.	51.4733°N 0.0042°W
Cadogan Place, Square and Lane (/kəˈdʌɡən/)	Kensington and Chelsea	Earl Cadogan	The road is built on land acquired by Charles Cadogan, 2nd Baron Cadogan on his marriage to Sir Hans Sloane's daughter.	51.49663°N 0.15753°W
Camden Town, Camden Street, Road, High Street Camden, Bayham Street and Pratt Street	Camden	Charles Pratt, 1st Earl Camden	Owner of the land on which the road and much of the surviving development was built in 1791. The forerunner districts, e.g. St Pancras are little-used.	51.5389°N 0.1385°W
Canning Road, Clyde Road, Elgin Road /ˈɛlɡɪn/, Havelock Road and Outram Road	Croydon	Charles Canning, 1st Earl Canning, Colin Campbell, 1st Baron Clyde, James Bruce, 8th Earl of Elgin, Henry Havelock and Sir James Outram, 1st Baronet	Group of five roads built on the site of the East India Company Military Seminary by the British Land Company, and named after prominent figures in the history of British India. Canning: statesman and Governor-General of India during the Indian Rebellion of 1857. Clyde, Havelock and Outram: all generals in India during the same rebellion. Elgin: Governor-General of India 1862–3.	51.3773°N 0.0795°W
Cannizaro Road (/kænɪˈzɑːrəʊ/)	Merton	Sophia Platemone, Duchess of Cannizzaro	Owner of Cannizaro House, now a hotel, to which the road leads, in the early nineteenth century. Cannizzaro is the correct Italian spelling. Wimbledon.	51.42577°N 0.2248°W
Carew Road	Sutton	Carew family	Owned Carew Manor in nearby Beddington, now a school, for 500 years; the road was built on former farm land owned by the family.	51.3602°N 0.1423°W
Cartwright Gardens	Camden	Major John Cartwright	Formerly Burton Crescent after its developer, James Burton. Renamed after social reformer who campaigned for universal suffrage, vote by ballot, annual parliaments and the abolition of slavery. He lived and died at No. 37, and a 21st-century erected sculpture is nearby.	51.5268°N 0.1269°W
Caxton Street	Westminster	William Caxton	English merchant, diplomat, writer and responsible for the introduction of the printing press to England; the first such press was established in 1476 in Westminster, close to the present road.	51.4986°N 0.1350°W
Chandos Crescent and Duke's Avenue	Harrow	James Brydges, 1st Duke of Chandos	Lived at Canons Park, to the north of the road buried in the parish at St Lawrence's church, Whitchurch, Little Stanmore	51.6076°N 0.2825°W
Charles II Street (Charles the second Street)	Westminster	King Charles II		51.5082°N 0.1325°W
Charlotte Street	Camden	Queen Charlotte	Married to King George III in 1761; the street was formed in 1763	51.5196°N 0.1359°W
Charlotte Despard Avenue	Wandsworth	Charlotte Despard	Nine Elms resident and long-time suffragist, socialist, pacifist, Sinn Féin activist, and novelist	51.4738°N 0.1543°W
Chatham Avenue	Bromley	William Pitt, 1st Earl of Chatham	Lived and died at Hayes Place, a former house on whose estate the road was built	51.3805°N 0.0129°E
Chester Terrace	Camden	Earl of Chester	One of the titles of George IV before he became king in 1820. The terrace was constructed in 1825.	51.5290°N 0.1454°W
Chesterfield Street and Chesterfield Walk	Westminster and Greenwich	Philip Stanhope, 4th Earl of Chesterfield	Both streets are named after houses called Chesterfield House, where the author lived.	51.50707°N 0.14843°W; 51.4734°N 0.0019°W
Cheyne Walk	Kensington and Chelsea	William Cheyne, 2nd Viscount Newhaven	Owned the manor of Chelsea until 1712	51.4823°N 0.17274°W
Chichele Road, Willesden and Chicheley Street, Lambeth	Brent and Lambeth	Henry Chichele	15th-century Archbishop of Canterbury who founded All Souls College, Oxford who owned much of Willesden. Lambeth Palace adjoins the latter site, the arch-episcopal palace in London.	51.5547°N 0.2167°W; 51.5028°N 0.1169°W
Clarence Street	Kingston upon Thames	Adelaide of Saxe-Meiningen	Opened the street in 1828, when she was Duchess of Clarence	51.4107°N 0.3024°W
Clarendon Road	Kensington and Chelsea	George Villiers, 4th Earl of Clarendon	Lord Privy Seal at the time the road was built	51.5108°N 0.2098°W
Cleveland Street	Camden	2nd Duke of Cleveland	Owner of the estate at the time of the layout of the road	51.5209°N 0.1392°W
Coventry Street	Westminster	Henry Coventry	Secretary to Charles II, who owned a house near the street	51.5102°N 0.1328°W
Craven Hill and Craven Road	Westminster	Earls of Craven	Owned the land on which the road was later built	51.5128°N 0.1814°W
Cromwell Road	Kensington and Chelsea	Richard Cromwell	Lord Protector of the Commonwealth of England, Scotland and Ireland who once owned a house there, son of English military and political leader Oliver Cromwell	51.495°N 0.1832°W
Cumberland Road	Richmond upon Thames	Prince William, Duke of Cumberland	Younger brother of King George II, who owned nearby Kew Palace. Kew.	51.4803°N 0.2856°W
Cumberland Terrace and Cumberland Market	Camden	Duke of Cumberland	Younger brother of King George IV at the time of the terrace's construction, 1826	51.5322°N 0.1464°W
Curzon Street	Westminster	George Howe, 3rd Viscount Howe	Curzon was a family name; George Howe was the ground landlord	51.5065°N 0.14982°W
Czar Street	Lewisham	Czar Peter the Great of Russia	Lived at Sayes Court, a former house nearby, in 1698 while studying shipbuilding at Deptford	51.4826°N 0.0281°W
Dacre Street /ˈdeɪkər/	Westminster	Lady Anne Dacre	Endowed (to charitable trust) Emmanuel Almshouses near-adjoining. Although now demolished, their legacy continues in the three schools, Westminster City School, Grey Coat Hospital and Emanuel School.	51.4952°N 0.1269°W
Dawes Street	Southwark	James Arthur Dawes	First mayor of Metropolitan Borough of Southwark	51.4885°N 0.0878°W
Dean Bradley Street	Westminster	George Granville Bradley	Dean of Westminster Abbey from 1881	51.4952°N 0.1269°W
Dean Farrar Street	Westminster	Frederic William Farrar	Sometime canon of Westminster Abbey	51.4993°N 0.1320°W
Dean Ryle Street	Westminster	Herbert Edward Ryle	Dean of Westminster Abbey from 1911	51.4943°N 0.1268°W
Defoe Road	Hackney	Daniel Defoe	Well-known author of Robinson Crusoe, who lived in a house at the north end of the road near its junction with Stoke Newington Church Street	51.5611°N 0.079°W
Denman Road	Southwark	Thomas Denman, 1st Baron Denman	Lord Chief Justice between 1832 and 1850. One of several streets on the estate named after lawyers.	51.4714°N 0.0759°W
Derry Street	Kensington and Chelsea	Charles Derry	With Joseph Toms, founded the former shop of Derry & Toms, near the north end of the street	51.5012°N 0.1913°W
Devonshire Road, Cavendish Road, Devonshire Gardens, Devonshire Place, Devonshire Street, Duke Road and Duke's Avenue	Hounslow	Dukes of Devonshire	Owners of Chiswick House, on whose large estate the roads were built. Re-built in 1811 by the 6th Duke.	51.49°N 0.2549°W
Dick Turpin Way	Hounslow	Dick Turpin	Notorious highwayman and robber of the 18th century who was believed to lurk on Hounslow Heath, near the location of the road, which is on the edge of London's Heathrow Airport.	51.4666°N 0.4203°W
Doctor Johnson Avenue	Wandsworth	Samuel Johnson	Johnson lived at Streatham Place, the villa of Henry and Hester Thrale in Streatham Park, immediately south-east of the Avenue, from 1766 to 1782.	51.4334°N 0.1481°W
Dorando Close	Hammersmith and Fulham	Dorando Pietri	Famed for finishing first in the marathon 1908 London summer Olympics, but being disqualified for receiving assistance	51.5132°N 0.2291°W
Dowding Road, Gossage Road, Keith Park Road, Portal Close, Saunders Road and Tedder Close	Hillingdon	Hugh Dowding, Leslie Gossage, Keith Park, Charles Portal, Hugh Saunders and Arthur Tedder	Cluster of streets built near the site of the former RAF Uxbridge, and all named after air marshals in the Second World War. Dowding: leader of the RAF during the Battle of Britain. Gossage: Inspector-General of the RAF and Air Member for Personnel. Park: leader of No. 11 Group RAF, which was coordinated nearby, in what is now the Battle of Britain Bunker. Portal: Chief of the Air Staff. Saunders: Chief of Staff for the Royal New Zealand Air Force. Tedder: Air Officer Commanding RAF Middle East Command.	51.546°N 0.4626°W
Doughty Street	Camden	Henry Doughty	Landlord of the area when the street was built in 1792–1810	51.524°N 0.1169°W
Downing Street	Westminster	Sir George Downing, 1st Baronet	Built by and named after Downing	51.5032°N 0.1275°W
Drury Lane	Westminster	Sir William Drury	Knight of the Garter in Queen Elizabeth's reign. Owned land on site.	51.5150°N 0.1228°W
Duchess of Bedford's Walk	Kensington and Chelsea	Lady Georgiana Russell, second wife of John Russell, 6th Duke of Bedford	Lived at Argyll Lodge, a former house on Campden Hill, near the location of the road	51.5028°N 0.1984°W
Duke Humphrey Road	Greenwich / Lewisham	Humphrey, Duke of Gloucester	The duke enclosed nearby Greenwich Park. A continuation of the road northwards leads to the Royal Observatory, Greenwich built on the site of Duke Humphrey's Tower.	51.4696°N 0.0055°E
Duke of Wellington Place, Belgravia and Wellington Road, St John's Wood	Westminster	Arthur Wellesley, 1st Duke of Wellington	The duke lived at Apsley House near the former street, and there is an equestrian statue of him nearby. The latter road was developed from about 1816, following Wellington's victory at the Battle of Waterloo. Many other examples of the duke's name and title (Wellesley and Wellington) are across the capital, less well connected.	51.50197°N 0.15112°W 51.5322°N 0.1717°W
Elizabeth Road, Fry Road and Katherine Road	Newham	Elizabeth Fry and her daughter Katherine Fry	Elizabeth Fry lived with her family at Plashet House, now demolished, which stood near the site of the roads. Katherine wrote a book about the local history of the area. East Ham.	51.5372°N 0.0414°E51.5393°N 0.0406°E
Elizabeth Way, Queens Avenue, Seymour Gardens /ˈsiːmɔːr/ and Parr Way	Hounslow	Elizabeth I of England and Catherine Parr	Elizabeth spent part of her childhood at Hanworth Manor of which these were part and sometimes stayed there during her reign. The latter two roads reflect the third and sixth wives of King Henry VIII. Catherine inherited the manor from 1544 until her death in 1548	51.4338°N 0.4024°W
Empress Drive	Bromley	Empress Eugénie of France	Lived in exile at nearby Camden Place from 1871 to 1881	51.418°N 0.064°E
Evelyn Street	Lewisham	John Evelyn	English writer and essayist who lived at Sayes Court, a former house in Deptford near the street	51.4857°N 0.0346°W
Fauconberg Road	Hounslow	Thomas Belasyse, 1st Earl of Fauconberg	Lived at Sutton Court, a former house that stood at the east end of the road. Chiswick.	51.4858°N 0.271°W
Flowers Close	Brent	Tommy Flowers	Flowers was the designer of the Colossus computer and worked at the Post Office Research Station adjacent to the road.	51.56180°N 0.23816°W
Fournier Street	Tower Hamlets	George Fournier	One of the Huguenot refugees who settled in the area near the street in the 18th century	51.5192°N 0.0731°W
Frith Street	Westminster	Richard Frith	Wealthy builder	51.51420°N 0.13190°W
Gainsborough Road	Richmond upon Thames	Thomas Gainsborough	Painter, buried in St Anne's Church, Kew	51.4704°N 0.2906°W
Garth Road	Merton	Richard Garth	A Sir Richard Garth became the owner and Lord of the manor of Morden just after the dissolution of the monasteries and maintained their connection with the parish for the next four centuries, until the manor was sold by another Sir Richard Garth in 1872.	51.3829°N 0.2235°W
General Wolfe Road	Greenwich	James Wolfe	General and conqueror of Quebec, who is buried in St Alfege's Church, Greenwich and has a memorial in Greenwich Park. He lived in a house called Macartney House near the road.	51.473°N 0.0029°W
George Street	Croydon	Saint George	Took its name from a former pub called the George and Dragon which stood in Croydon, and named after the saint (not from a former church dedicated to the saint). The present George Pub in Croydon is its successor.	51.374°N 0.0969°W
George Street	Richmond upon Thames	King George III	Main street of Richmond. Took current name in king's honour 1769. Formerly known as Richmond High Street.	51.4606°N 0.3048°W
George V Avenue	Harrow	King George V	The road was built shortly before the Second World War and named in memory of the monarch, who died in 1936. Between Hatch End and Harrow.	51.5983°N 0.369°W
Gloucester Road	Kensington and Chelsea	Maria, Duchess of Gloucester and Edinburgh	Formerly called Hogmore Lane; renamed in 1826 after the duchess who built a house in the road in 1805, and now demolished	51.4948°N 0.1827°W
Gloucester Road and Gloucester Court	Richmond upon Thames	Prince William Henry, Duke of Gloucester and Edinburgh	Owner of the land on which the roads were later built. Kew.	51.4824°N 0.2844°W
Golborne Road	Kensington and Chelsea	Dean Golbourne	One time vicar of St. John's Church in Paddington	51.52162°N 0.20881°W
Goodge Street	Camden	Mr. Goodge	Goodge was a speculative builder of the houses which form the street in the late 18th century.	51.5195°N 0.1352°W
Gower Street (/ˈɡaʊ.ər/, trad. /ɡɔːr/)	Camden	Gertrude Leveson-Gower	Wife of the 4th Duke of Bedford, who supervised the laying of the street	51.5224°N 0.1326°W
Grahame Park Way	Barnet	Claude Grahame-White	Founded the Grahame-White Aviation Company near the site of the road in 1911	51.6034°N 0.2406°W
Great Marlborough Street	Westminster	John Churchill, 1st Duke of Marlborough		51.51440°N 0.13883°W
Gresham Street	City of London	Thomas Gresham (1519–1579)	Created in 1845 and named for a notable sixteenth century city financier	51.51537°N 0.09321°W
Guilford Street	Camden	Lord North, 2nd Earl of Guilford	Statesman; Prime Minister; the President of the Foundling Hospital, which originally stood in the street	51.5235°N 0.1198°W
Hallam Street	Westminster	Henry Hallam	English historian	51.52079°N 0.14373°W
Hambro Avenue /ˈhæmbrə/ and Everard /ɛvərɑːrd/ Avenue	Bromley	Everard Hambro	Banker who lived at Hayes Place, a former house on whose estate the road was later built	51.3794°N 0.0157°E
Hamilton Road, Hardy Road, Nelson Road, Victory Road and Trafalgar Road	Merton	Admiral Horatio Nelson, 1st Viscount Nelson, and those most famously connected to him.	Consecutive streets built on the estate of Merton Place, Admiral Nelson's house; named after Emma, Lady Hamilton, his mistress and prominent society model and courtier; Thomas Hardy, captain of his flagship; Nelson himself; his flagship HMS Victory; and the Battle of Trafalgar where he destroyed French & Spanish plans to invade the UK, but died himself.	51.4171°N 0.1914°W
Handel (/ˈhɑːndəl/) Close	Harrow	George Frideric Handel	Well-known German composer who was employed by the Duke of Chandos at Canons Park and reputedly played on the organ of St Lawrence's church nearby. The road was built on part of the estate.	51.6127°N 0.2876°W
Harley Street	Westminster	Robert Harley, 1st Earl of Oxford and Earl Mortimer	Was the 1st Earl of Oxford and Earl Mortimer and had one son, Edward Harley	51.5206°N 0.1477°W
Harrington Road, Harrington Gardens, Stanhope Gardens, Petersham Lane, Petersham Mews and Petersham Place	Kensington and Chelsea	Earls of Harrington	Owned the area on which the road was later built. The family continued to own it until 1957.	51.494°N 0.1767°W
Hatton Garden	Camden	Sir Christopher Hatton, Lord Chancellor	Most of estate leased to Hatton by Elizabeth I in 1581, following a vacancy in the position of Bishop of Ely, whom she appointed. Holborn.	51.5201°N 0.1084°W
Henriques Street	Tower Hamlets	Basil Henriques 1890–1961	Location of a social club run by philanthropist Henriques	51.51397°N 0.06547°W
Hogarth Lane	Hounslow	William Hogarth	Painter, who is buried in the parish church, and whose house, now a museum, is in the road. Chiswick.	51.4871°N 0.2552°W
Holyoake Walk, Denison Road, Ludlow Road and Neville Road	Ealing	George Holyoake, Frederick Denison Maurice, John Malcolm Forbes Ludlow and John Neville Figgis	Set of streets in Ealing laid out in the 19th century and named after Christian socialists. Holyoake was a newspaper editor who coined the phrase "secularism"; Denison Maurice was a prominent author and lecturer on the subject; Ludlow founded the newspaper The Christian Socialist; Neville Figgis was a priest and advocate of pluralism.	51.52769°N 0.31047°W
Holland: Road, Park Avenue and Villas Road	Kensington and Chelsea	Henry Rich, 1st Earl of Holland	First owner of Holland House and Holland Park, to the east of the road	51.5015°N 0.21246°W
Hungerford Road	Camden	Edward Hungerford	Founder and owner of market. Co-source of Hungerford Bridge, arguably a street.	51.5500°N 0.1254°W
Inigo Jones Road	Greenwich	Inigo Jones	The road in Charlton within former estate of Charlton House with features by or in the style of Jones	51.4779°N 0.0442°E
Irving Street	Westminster	Henry Irving	In London's Theatreland. Named after the first actor to be knighted.	51.5099°N 0.1289°W
Jack Cornwell Street	Newham	Jack Cornwell	First World War sailor boy and recipient of the Victoria Cross, who grew up here. Little Ilford, East Ham.	51.552°N 0.0634°E
Jermyn Street	Westminster	Henry Jermyn, 1st Earl of St Albans	Developed much of St. James's around 1667	51.5085°N 0.1365°W
John Archer Way	Wandsworth	John Archer	First black mayor of a London council – Battersea Borough Council, in 1913/4	51.45390°N 0.17467°W
John Bradshaw Road	Enfield	John Bradshaw	Benefactor of Southgate, who lived nearby in The Bourne	51.631°N 0.1269°W
John Burns Drive	Barking & Dagenham	John Burns	English trade unionist and politician, particularly associated with London politics and Battersea	51.536213°N 0.094393°E
John Carpenter Street	City of London	John Carpenter	Town clerk of the City of London in the fifteenth century, and founder of the City of London School	51.512°N 0.1063°W
John Islip (/ˈaɪslɪp/) Street	Westminster	John Islip	Abbot of the monastery of Westminster at the time of Henry VIII	51.4930°N 0.1275°W
John Wilson Street	Greenwich	John Wilson	Minister of Woolwich Baptist Tabernacle, now Woolwich Central Baptist Church, who gave generously to the local poor	51.4903°N 0.0623°E
Keats Grove	Camden	John Keats	Writer who lived in the road, and whose house is now a museum. The road was formerly called John Street.	51.5558°N 0.1686°W
Kilmorey Road and Kilmorey Gardens	Richmond upon Thames	Francis Needham, 2nd Earl of Kilmorey	Earl buried with his mistress in the Kilmorey Mausoleum, near the road	51.4629°N 0.3219°W
King Edward's Road	Barking and Dagenham	King Edward VII	Originally called Creeksmouth Lane; renamed in 1902 to commemorate the king's coronation	51.5317°N 0.086°E
King George VI Avenue	Merton	King George VI	The avenue was made to commemorate the king's coronation in 1937.	51.3988°N 0.1618°W
King Street	Hammersmith and Fulham	John King	Bishop of London who gave generously to the poor of Fulham in 1620	51.493°N 0.2355°W
King William Walk (and King William Street, City of London and others)	Greenwich and City of London	King William IV	His memorial is in the street near the National Maritime Museum. The City example is one of many – merely built in his reign.	51.4809°N 0.008°W; 51.509444°N 0.086944°W
King's Road	Kensington and Chelsea	King Charles II	Formerly private road used by the king to travel to Kew Palace	51.48737°N 0.168874°W
Kingsway	Camden / Westminster	King Edward VII	Opened the street in 1905	51.515333°N 0.118944°W
Kneller Road	Richmond upon Thames	Godfrey Kneller	Lived at Kneller Hall in the road, now a school. Whitton, Twickenham	51.455°N 0.3513°W
Kossuth Street	Greenwich	Lajos Kossuth	Hungarian national hero who lived in London in the 1850s. Greenwich.	51.487°N 0.0034°E
Ladbroke Grove, Road, Terrace, Square, Gardens, Walk and Crescent	Kensington and Chelsea	James Weller Ladbroke	Developed the North Kensington area around 1840	51.5171°N 0.2098°W
Lansbury Gardens	Tower Hamlets	George Lansbury	British politician (MP 1910–1912, 1922–1940) and social reformer who led the Labour Party from 1932 to 1935. Blackwall (ex.-Poplar).	51.51269°N 0.00494°W
Lansdowne Road, Lansdowne Crescent and Lansdowne Rise	Kensington and Chelsea	Henry Petty-Fitzmaurice, 3rd Marquess of Lansdowne	Home Secretary and later Chancellor of the Exchequer at the time the road was built	51.5099°N 0.2074°W
Latimer Road, Kensington, Latymer Road, Edmonton and Latymer Way, Edmonton	Enfield and Kensington and Chelsea	Edward Latymer	Clerk at the Court of Wards and Liveries who bequeathed the land on which Latimer Road was later built to help fund Latymer Upper School, which he founded. The school's playing fields are situated west of the road. Originally it ran past the tube station of the same name, but after it was split by the Westway flyover, the south part was renamed Freston Road after the village in Suffolk associated with Latymer. The roads in Edmonton are located near The Latymer School, also founded by Edward Latymer	51.518°N 0.2242°W 51.6297°N 0.0663°W
Benson Road, Chichele Gardens, Cranmer Road, Davidson Road, Howley Road, Laud Street, Longley Road, Parker Road, Sheldon Street, Stafford Road, Sumner Road, Tait Road, Temple Road, Tennison Road, Warham Road and Whitgift Street	Croydon	Edward White Benson, Henry Chichele, Thomas Cranmer, Randall Davidson, William Howley, William Laud, Charles Longley, Matthew Parker, Gilbert Sheldon, John Stafford, John Bird Sumner, Archibald Campbell Tait, William Temple, Thomas Tenison, William Warham and John Whitgift	Croydon Palace was the residence of the Archbishop of Canterbury for over 500 years and various roads in the borough are named after former archbishops.	
Leigh Hunt Drive	Enfield	Leigh Hunt	English writer born in Southgate	51.6301°N 0.1251°W
Lillie Road and Lillie Yard	Hammersmith and Fulham	Sir John Scott Lillie	Lillie first laid out the easternmost section of the road across his North End Hermitage estate in 1826.	51.48752°N 0.19558°W
Lind Road	Sutton	Jenny Lind	Swedish singer who entertained the people of Sutton in 1847	51.3643°N 0.1856°W
Liverpool Street	City of London	Robert Banks Jenkinson, 2nd Earl of Liverpool	The street was built in 1829 and named after the former prime minister, who had died the previous year.	51.5174°N 0.0824°W
Lonsdale Road and Lowther Road	Richmond upon Thames	Earls of Lonsdale	William Lowther, 2nd Earl of Lonsdale bought the land in 1846, on which the roads were later built.	51.4845°N 0.2447°W
Lyndhurst Grove, Lyndhurst Way and Lyndhurst Square	Southwark	John Copley, 1st Baron Lyndhurst	Lawyer and politician, three times Lord Chancellor of Great Britain	51.4701°N 0.0781°W
Lyons Walk	Hammersmith and Fulham	Joseph Lyons	Originally part of Blythe Road; runs past the site of the former Cadby Hall, which was the headquarters of Lyons' catering company and near where he lived.	51.4953°N 0.21214°W
Lytton Road	Harrow	Edward Bulwer-Lytton, 1st Baron Lytton	Author who owned nearby Pinnerwood House, and wrote Eugene Aram there. Pinner.	51.6069°N 0.3804°W
Malet Street	Camden	Sir Edward Malet	Married to Lady Ermyntrude Sackville Russell, daughter of Francis Russell, 9th Duke of Bedford, who owned much of the surrounding area	51.5214°N 0.1302°W
Mandela Street (/mænˈdɛlə/)	Camden	Nelson Mandela	The street was originally called Selous Street, after Frederick Selous, a game hunter in South Africa who was born in the area. The street in the 1960s became the base of the Anti-Apartheid Movement and in 1985 it was renamed in honour of the then imprisoned ANC leader, who nine years later would become South Africa's first democratically elected president.	51.5378°N 0.1366°W
Manoel Road	Richmond upon Thames	King Manoel II of Portugal	Last king of Portugal, home: nearby demolished Fulwell Park House from 1910 (the year of the Portuguese Revolution) until death, 1932. Manoel is the Portuguese spelling.	51.4406°N 0.3603°W
Matthew Parker Street and Parker Road	Westminster	Most Rev. Matthew Parker	Archbishop of Canterbury from 1559 until 1575	51.5002°N 0.1305°W
Maysoule Road	Wandsworth	Rev. Israel May Soule	From 1838, Minister of the Baptist Chapel in Battersea; originally called May Soule Road	51.46366°N 0.17876°W
Meard Street	Westminster	John Meard, the younger	Carpenter, later esquire, who developed it in the 1720s and 1730s	51.51329°N 0.13295°W
Menelik Road	Camden	Menelik II of Ethiopia	The road was built on the estate of the Powell-Cotton family, one of whom, Major Percy Powell-Cotton, was given permission by Emperor Menelik to hunt in Ethiopia in 1900.	51.5551°N 0.2049°W
Milton Street	Islington	Mr. Milton	Carpenter and builder who in 1830, at the time of the name change, owned the building lease of the street at the time. The street was previously known as Grub Street.	51.5203°N 0.0908°W
Mornington Crescent, Place, Street and Terrace	Camden	Garret Wesley, 1st Earl of Mornington	His daughter Anne married Henry Fitzroy, brother of the 1st Baron Southampton, on whose estate the road was built.	51.5335°N 0.1405°W
Mortimer Street	Westminster	Edward Harley, 2nd Earl of Oxford and Earl Mortimer	Developer of Cavendish Square in London, and the streets around it, from 1715. Amongst his titles were Earl of Oxford and Mortimer, and Baron Harley of Wigmore Castle.	51.5178°N 0.1403°W
Nelson Road	Merton	Horatio Nelson	Owned the land on which road was later built	51.4171°N 0.1893°W
Newton Street	Camden	Isaac Newton	Scientist and mathematician	51.51686°N 0.12157°W
Northumberland Avenue	Westminster	Dukes of Northumberland	The avenue was built in the 1870s on the site of Northumberland House, the redundant, demolished home of the Duke of Northumberland (see Syon House and Alnwick Castle.	51.5068°N 0.1242°W
Elizabeth Way, Queens Avenue, Seymour Gardens and Parr Way	Hounslow	Elizabeth I of England and Catherine Parr	Elizabeth spent part of her childhood at Hanworth Manor close nearby and sometimes stayed there during her reign. The latter two roads reflect the third and sixth wives of King Henry VIII. Catherine inherited the manor from 1544 until her death in 1548.	51.4338°N 0.4024°W
Northumberland Crescent	Hounslow	Duke of Northumberland's River	The so-called river, a surface level aqueduct, adjoins and is back-named after Hugh Percy, 1st Duke of Northumberland and his successors who maintained the canal. His wife's direct forebear re-inherited much of the land of the borough in 1594. The family continues to own Syon House.	51.456°N 0.428°W
Orleans Road	Richmond upon Thames	Louis Philippe I, previously Duke of Orleans	French royal, later king, who lived in exile at Orleans House near the road	51.4495°N 0.3175°W
Ormond Road (x2), Ormond Avenue	Richmond upon Thames	Earls of Ormond	Owned the land on which the roads were later built, the Richmond one first (1761–1778), the Hampton ones in the borough later	51.4586°N 0.3044°W
Oxford Street	Westminster	Edward Harley, 2nd Earl of Oxford and Earl Mortimer	Developer of Cavendish Square in London, and the streets around it, from 1715	51.5136°N 0.1556°W
Pelham Crescent, Pelham Place and Pelham Street	Kensington and Chelsea	Henry Pelham, 3rd Earl of Chichester	A former trustee of the Smith's Charity Estate, on which the road was built	51.4931°N 0.1709°W
Pemberton Row	City of London	Sir James Pemberton	Lord Mayor of London in 1611, and a member of the Worshipful Company of Goldsmiths, on whose estate the road was built	51.5152°N 0.1085°W
Pepys Street	City of London	Samuel Pepys	1923 renaming. Pepys lived there during the Great Fire of London.	51.51076°N 0.07804°W
Pigott Street	Tower Hamlets	Francis Pigott Stainsby Conant	Family owned the undeveloped estate. Limehouse.	51.51287°N 0.02595°W
Plender Street	Camden	William Plender, 1st Baron Plender	Accountant and public servant who served as Sheriff of the County of London in 1927	51.5368°N 0.1369°W
Pleydell Street	City of London	Earls of Radnor	The Pleydell-Bouveries, Earls of Radnor, were landlords of this area.	51.51393°N 0.10822°W
Pope's Grove and Pope's Avenue	Richmond upon Thames	Alexander Pope	Poet who had built the demolished Pope's Villa and surviving Pope's Grotto, and is buried in St Mary's Church, Twickenham	51.4420°N 0.3356°W
Portland Place	Westminster	William Bentinck, 2nd Duke of Portland	Margaret Bentinck, Duchess of Portland, the daughter of Edward Harley, 2nd Earl of Oxford and Earl Mortimer, inherited his land and property and married into the Portland family.	51.52023°N 0.14499°W
Powys Lane	Enfield	Henry Philip Powys	Rented nearby Broomfield House in 1816	51.6172°N 0.1199°W
Praed Street	Westminster	William Praed	Chairman of the company which built the canal basin which lies just to the north	51.5170°N 0.1731°W
Prestons Road	Tower Hamlets	Sir Robert Preston	Captain of the East India Company who owned the land before the West India Docks were developed	51.502225°N 0.008620°W
Prince Albert Road	Camden / Westminster	Prince Albert	Originally called Albert Road; renamed after the Prince Consort of Queen Victoria in 1938	51.536667°N 0.157778°W
Prince Arthur Road	Camden	Prince Arthur, Duke of Connaught and Strathearn	Son of Queen Victoria who opened a home for sailors' daughters in the area in 1869	51.5544°N 0.1771°W
Prince Charles Drive	Barnet	King Charles III	Located next to Brent Cross Shopping Centre, which was opened in 1976 by the present King Charles III when he was Prince of Wales. Hendon.	51.57538°N 0.22293°W
Prince Consort Road	Westminster	Albert, Prince Consort	Part of Albertopolis	51.49986°N 0.17703°W
Prince Henry Road	Greenwich	Henry Frederick, Prince of Wales	The road was built on the estate of Charlton House, whose original owner, Adam Newton, was the Prince's tutor.	51.4765°N 0.0427°E
Prince Imperial Road	Bromley	Napoléon, Prince Imperial	Lived in exile at nearby Camden Place from 1871 until his death in 1879	51.413°N 0.069°E
Queen Anne's Gate	Westminster	Queen Anne	Queen of England, Scotland and Ireland from 1702, and after the Act of Union, Queen of Great Britain until 1714	51.5005°N 0.1330°W
Queen Caroline Street	Hammersmith and Fulham	Caroline of Brunswick	Wife of George IV, who lived and died in nearby Brandenburg House	51.4908°N 0.2252°W
Queen Elizabeth Road	Kingston upon Thames	Queen Elizabeth I	The queen founded Kingston Grammar School at Lovekyn Chapel, which is at the south end of the street (the school's main buildings are opposite).	51.4119°N 0.2964°W
Queen Elizabeth's Walk	Hackney	Queen Elizabeth I	The queen's friend, Robert Dudley, 1st Earl of Leicester, lived in Stoke Newington.	51.5638°N 0.0863°W
Queen Victoria Street	City of London	Queen Victoria		51.512°N 0.09993°W
Queensway	Westminster	Queen Victoria	Named Queen's Road in honour of Victoria, who had been born at nearby Kensington Palace. Later renamed.	51.51308°N 0.18763°W
Raphael Avenue	Havering	Herbert Raphael	Politician who owned the former Gidea Hall, and was later responsible for the development of the area, including the avenue. Romford.	51.5883°N 0.1865°E
Rathbone Place	Camden	Captain Rathbone	One Captain Rathbone was the builder of the road and properties thereon, from about 1718.	51.5108°N 0.1387°W
Regent Street	Westminster	King George IV	Named c. 1811, when George IV was prince regent	51.5108°N 0.1387°W
Repton Avenue, Repton Drive and Repton Gardens	Havering	Humphry Repton	Landscape gardener who lived in a cottage (now demolished) near where the roads were later built. Gidea Park, near Romford.	51.5843°N 0.1972°E
Romney Road	Greenwich	Henry Sydney, 1st Earl of Romney	Built the road in about 1695, when Chief Ranger of Greenwich Park, to restore communication between Greenwich and Woolwich	51.4819°N 0.006°W
Rosebery Avenue	Islington	Archibald Primrose, 5th Earl of Rosebery	First Chairman of the London County Council, who opened the road in 1892	51.526°N 0.1099°W
Roy Grove and Cannon Close	Richmond upon Thames	Major-General William Roy	One of Roy's two cannons he used to map Middlesex is in the road in Hampton Hill.	51.426°N 0.3656°W
St Erkenwald Road	Barking and Dagenham	Saint Erkenwald	Saint and Bishop of London who founded Barking Abbey to the west of the road	51.5362°N 0.0836°E
Savile Row	Westminster	Lady Dorothy Savile	Wife of the Richard Boyle, 3rd Earl of Burlington, architect and developer	51.51109°N 0.14059°W
Savoy Place	Westminster	Peter II, Count of Savoy	Gave his name to the Savoy Palace, which stood on the site of the road	51.50924°N 0.12093°W
Selwyn Avenue	Richmond upon Thames	William Selwyn	Owned, and lived near, the land on which the road was later built; contributed to the founding of nearby church St John the Divine, Richmond	51.4666°N 0.2952°W
Shaftesbury Avenue	Westminster	Anthony Ashley-Cooper, 7th Earl of Shaftesbury	Shaftesbury was an active philanthropist, and as a member of parliament he was responsible for several reforming acts designed to alleviate the suffering of the poor. The new avenue replaced slum housing, and was finished in the year of his death, 1886.	51.5120°N 0.1320°W
Sopwith Way	Kingston upon Thames	Thomas Sopwith	Aviation pioneer who set up a factory near the east end of the road, where his earliest aircraft were made	51.4135°N 0.3015°W
Southampton Row and Southampton Street	Camden	Thomas Wriothesley, 4th Earl of Southampton	Landowner	51.5198°N 0.1221°W
Stanley Crescent and Stanley Gardens	Kensington and Chelsea	Edward Stanley, 2nd Baron Stanley of Alderley	President of the Board of Trade at the time the road was built	51.5121°N 0.2043°W
Steve Biko Way	Hounslow	Steve Biko	South African anti-apartheid activist	51.4679°N 0.3689°W
Swallow Street	Westminster	Thomas Swallow	Lessee in 1540 of the pastures on which the road was built	51.50949°N 0.13751°W
Talfourd Road	Southwark	Thomas Talfourd	Judge and politician, buried in West Norwood Cemetery, south of the street	51.472°N 0.0775°W
Tallis Street	City of London	Thomas Tallis	Composer and hymn-writer whose name is engraved on the façade of the nearby former building of the Guildhall School of Music and Drama, which stood here until 1977	51.5119°N 0.1072°W
Tetty Way	Bromley	Elizabeth Johnson (known as "Tetty")	Wife of Dr Johnson, who is buried in the nearby Bromley Parish Church	51.4047°N 0.01396°E
Thomas More Street	Tower Hamlets	Thomas More	Lawyer, writer and statesman executed in the nearby Tower of London, who has a memorial plaque in the street	51.5074°N 0.0683°W
Throgmorton Street	City of London	Nicholas Throckmorton	Chief banker of England in the reign of Queen Elizabeth	51.5149°N 0.0865°W
Tom Cribb Road	Greenwich	Tom Cribb	World boxing champion of 1810, who lived and died in Woolwich, where the road is located	51.4919°N 0.0797°E
Tooley Street	Southwark	Saint Olaf	King of Norway who fought with Æthelred the Unready against the Danes allegedly in what became the parish of St Olave's, Southwark. He was canonised and the name was corrupted from St Olaf to Tooley. The church was demolished in 1926 and St Olaf House, with a stone relief of him, stands on the site.	51.5046°N 0.0836°W
Tyers Street, Jonathan Street and Tyers Walk	Lambeth	Jonathan Tyers	The road passes Vauxhall Gardens. Tyers was the owner in the eighteenth century.	51.489°N 0.119°W
Tylney Road	Newham	Richard Child, 1st Earl Tylney	Builder of Wanstead Park, a former house whose estate extended southwards to the location of the road	51.5533°N 0.0337°E
Vera Lynn Close	Newham	Dame Vera Lynn	Actress and singer born in the local area	51.5530°N 0.0245°E
Vere Street	Westminster	Earls of Oxford	A family name of the area's owners at the time of its construction, the Earls of Oxford	51.51499°N 0.14722°W
Victoria Street and Embankment	Westminster	Queen Victoria	Separated by Parliament Square from the embankment, the road bisects the mid-west neighbourhood of Westminster is sometimes called Victoria after its station particularly towards Buckingham Palace and less so toward the south where it is Belgravia. Many other examples of the monarch's name are across the capital, less well connected.	51.4980°N 0.1335°W
Villiers Street and Buckingham Street	Westminster	George Villiers, 2nd Duke of Buckingham	The streets were built in the 1670s on the site of York House, Villiers' mansion. Originally a full set of George Street, Villiers Street, Duke Street, Of Alley, and Buckingham Street; George Street became York Buildings in 1862, Of Alley became York Place in 1865 and Duke Street became John Adam Street in 1940.	51.5080°N 0.1238°W
Waldegrave Road, Park and Gardens (trad. /wɔːlɡreɪv/	Richmond upon Thames	Frances Waldegrave	Wife of the 7th Earl Waldegrave who lived at Strawberry Hill House in the 19th century in the road. Twickenham.	51.433°N 0.3385°W
Walker Close	Enfield	The Walkers of Southgate	Prominent local family who owned Arnos Grove (now Southgate Beaumont) on nearby Cannon Hill. The street is located near the better known Arnos Grove tube station.	51.6173°N 0.1327°W
Wardour Street	Westminster	Archibald Wardour	Architect of several buildings on the street	51.5142°N 0.1346°W
Warren Street	Camden	Anne Warren	Wife of Charles FitzRoy, 1st Baron Southampton, the land owner responsible for the development of the area – see Fitzroy Square	51.5238°N 0.1409°W
Wat Tyler Road	Lewisham	Wat Tyler	Rebel who launched the Peasants' Revolt in 1381	51.4707°N 0.0068°W
White Kennett Street	City of London	White Kennett	Bishop of Peterborough (1707), and previously rector of the nearly St Botolph's Aldgate	51.5154°N 0.0773°W
Whitfield Street	Camden	George Whitefield	Builder of Whitefield's Tabernacle, in the vicinity, in 1756	51.5212°N 0.1361°W
Whittaker Avenue	Richmond upon Thames	John Whittaker Ellis	First mayor of Richmond, who bought a building adjacent to the road which became the town hall	51.4590°N 0.3065°W
Wilberforce Road	Hackney	William Wilberforce	British politician, philanthropist and a leader of the movement to abolish the slave trade, who spent substantial time in Stoke Newington coordinating campaigns	51.5633°N 0.0983°W
Wilberforce Way and Lauriston Road	Merton	William Wilberforce	British politician, philanthropist and a leader of the movement to abolish the slave trade, lived at Lauriston House, demolished in 1957 to build Wilberforce Way. Lauriston Road runs along the boundary of the original property. The coach house remains, at 6 Southside Common.	51.4228°N 0.2232°W
William Barefoot Drive	Greenwich	William Barefoot	A prominent local politician, who was mayor of Woolwich three times	51.432°N 0.0585°E
William IV Street	Westminster	King William IV		51.5095°N 0.1252°W
William Morris Close	Waltham Forest	William Morris	Artist who spent his childhood at the nearby Water House, which is now the William Morris Gallery	51.59055°N 0.02825°W
Wilton Crescent, Place, Row and Terrace	Kensington and Chelsea	Thomas Egerton, 2nd Earl of Wilton	Second son of Robert Grosvenor, 1st Marquess of Westminster; the road forms part of the Grosvenor estate	51.50086°N 0.15543°W
Woffington Close	Richmond upon Thames	Peg Woffington	18th-century actress who performed in Teddington, near where the road is located, and buried in Teddington parish church	51.4165°N 0.3153°W
Wren Road	Southwark	Sir Christopher Wren	The road was built on the grounds of a former house said to have been occupied by Wren.	51.4734°N 0.0918°W
Young Street	Kensington and Chelsea	Thomas Young	Developer of the area, including Kensington Square	51.5015°N 0.1899°W
Boleyn Drive, Aragon Drive, Cleves Way, and Seymour Gardens	Hillingdon	Anne Boleyn, Catherine of Aragon, Anne of Cleves, and Jane Seymour	All wives of Henry VIII	51.570382°N 0.389697°W

== Squares ==
Square	Borough(s)	Named after	Comments	Coordinates
Bedford Square	Camden	Dukes of Bedford	All named after the Dukes of Bedford on whose land they were built Much of the area is still owned by the Bedford Estate. Other examples include Bedford Row, Bedford Avenue, Bedford Street, and Bedford Place.	51.5187°N 0.1309°W
Berkeley Square	Westminster	Berkeley family	The family's Berkeley House had stood nearby until 1733.	51.50964°N 0.14578°W
Cavendish Square	Westminster	Henrietta Harley, Countess of Oxford and Mortimer née Henrietta Cavendish Holles	The square and adjoining streets were named after the various relatives of Robert Harley, 1st Earl of Oxford and Earl Mortimer, and of his son, Edward. Henrietta was Edward's wife.	51.5165°N 0.1450°W
Connaught Square	Westminster	Prince William Frederick, Duke of Gloucester and Edinburgh	Also known as the Earl of Connaught, built up in his lifetime	51.51437°N 0.16384°W
Fitzroy Square	Camden	Charles FitzRoy, 2nd Duke of Grafton	The square takes its name from the family name of Charles FitzRoy, 2nd Duke of Grafton, into whose ownership the land passed through his marriage. His descendant Charles FitzRoy, 1st Baron Southampton developed the area during the late 18th and early 19th century.	51.5235°N 0.1404°W
General Gordon Square	Greenwich	Charles George Gordon	General born in Woolwich, who trained at the nearby Royal Military Academy. The road was originally called General Gordon Place until 2011, when it was redeveloped and renamed.	51.4901°N 0.0677°E
Gordon Square and Gordon Street	Camden	Lady Georgiana Gordon, second wife of the John Russell, 6th Duke of Bedford	The Russell family gave their names to over seventy streets and squares in Bloomsbury.	51.5243°N 0.1309°W
Grosvenor Square, Grosvenor Hill and Grosvenor Street	Westminster	The Grosvenor family – Dukes of Westminster	Owners of the land on which the Square is built.	51.5115°N 0.1514°W
Leicester Square	Westminster	Robert Sidney, 2nd Earl of Leicester	Owner of the land on which the square is built, from 1630; ordered by the Privy Council to allow public access to the square	51.5103°N 0.1303°W
Myddelton Square	Islington	Sir Hugh Myddelton	Founder of the New River Company, who developed the square	51.5301°N 0.1082°W
Percy Circus and Great Percy Street	Islington	Robert Percy Smith	A director of the New River Company, who developed the area, including the circus	51.52925°N 0.11418°W
Portman Square	Westminster	Henry William Portman	Built between 1674 and 1684 on land belonging to Portman	51.51575°N 0.15581°W
Russell Square	Camden	Dukes of Bedford	Family name of the Dukes of Bedford who owned the land	51.5217°N 0.1261°W
Sloane Square	Kensington and Chelsea	Hans Sloane	His heirs owned the land on which the square and nearby Sloane Street are built.	51.4925°N 0.1572°W
Smith Square	Westminster	Sir James Smith/the Smith family	Owners of the land on which the square was built, c. 1726	51.4959°N 0.1270°W
Tavistock Square	Camden	Francis Russell, Marquess of Tavistock	Family name of the Dukes of Bedford who owned the land	51.5250°N 0.1291°W
Thurloe Square, Close, Place and Street	Kensington and Chelsea	John Thurloe	Owned the land on which the square was later built, and was said to have been given it by Oliver Cromwell for services during the Commonwealth	51.4947°N 0.1719°W
Vincent Square	Westminster	William Vincent	Dean of Westminster Abbey who caused the square to be carved out for the use of Westminster School boys, when Tothill Fields was being developed	51.4932°N 0.1351°W

== See also ==
- List of eponymous streets in Metro Manila
- List of eponymous streets in New York City
