= The Greyhound, Kensington =

Pub in Kensington, London

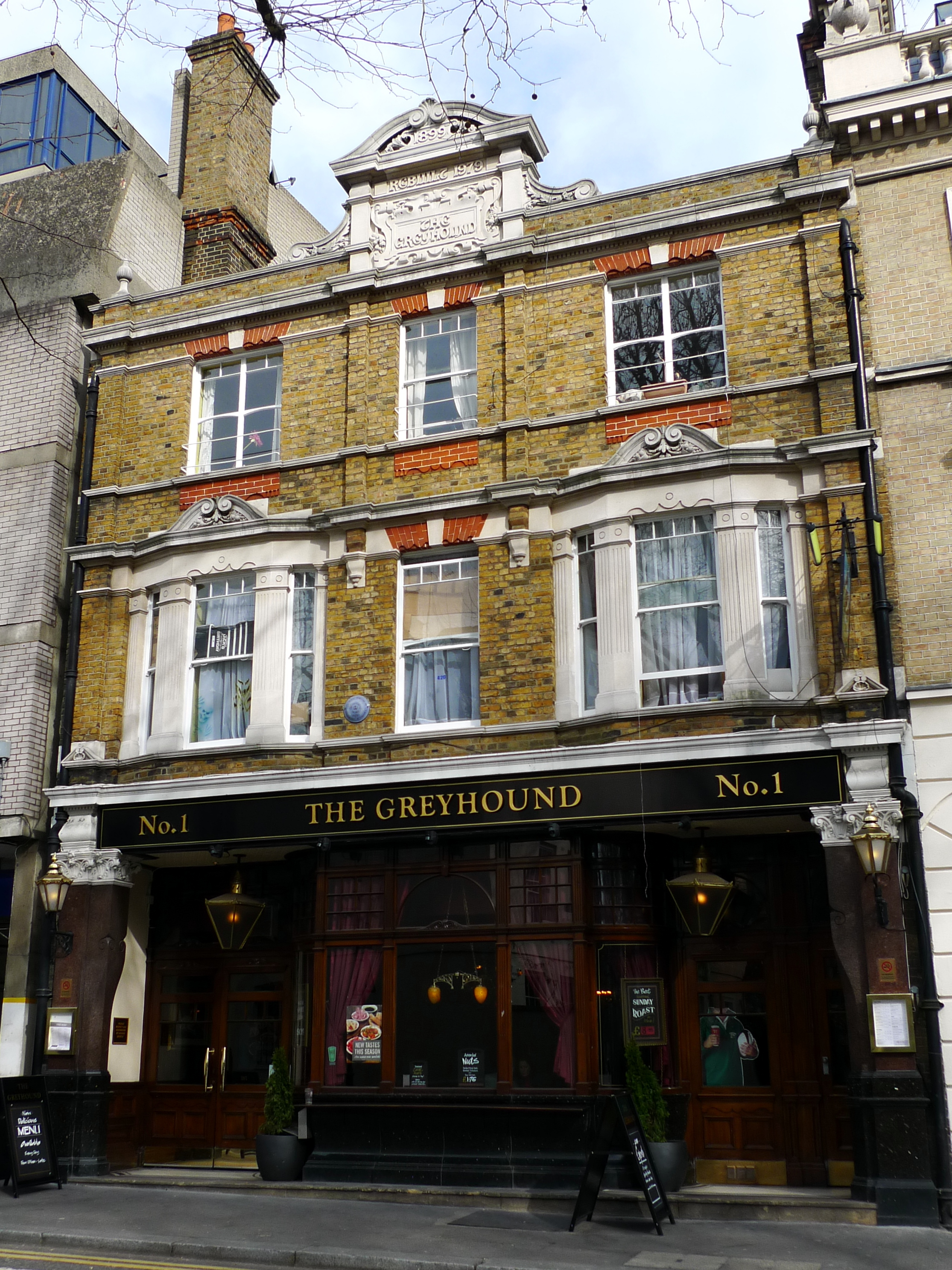
- (2009)

- Location within Royal Borough of Kensington and Chelsea Location within Greater London

General information
- Location: 1 Kensington Square, Kensington, London W8., London, England
- Coordinates: 51.501090°N 0.189304°W

Design and construction
- Designations

Listed Building – Grade II
- Official name: The Greyhound Public House
- Designated: 6 May 1970
- Reference no.: 1224373

The Greyhound is a pub at 1 Kensington Square, Kensington, London W8.

It is a Grade II listed building, built in about 1899.
