= Bedford Square =

Garden square in the Borough of Camden in London, England

Coordinates: 51°31′08.08″N 00°07′48.39″W

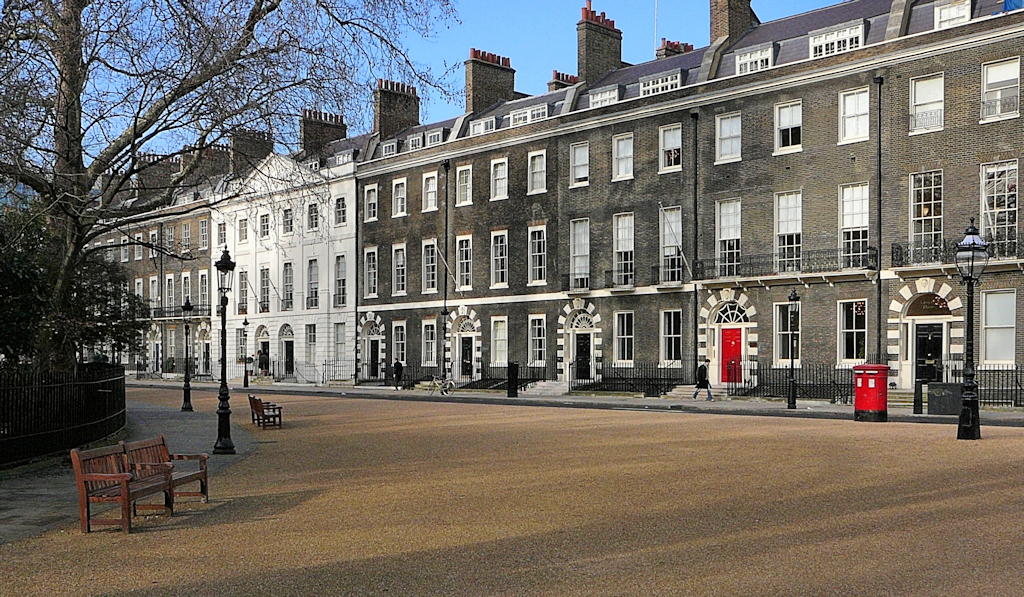
The north side of Bedford Square, viewed from near the north-east corner

Bedford Square is a garden square in the Bloomsbury district of the Borough of Camden in London, England.

== History ==
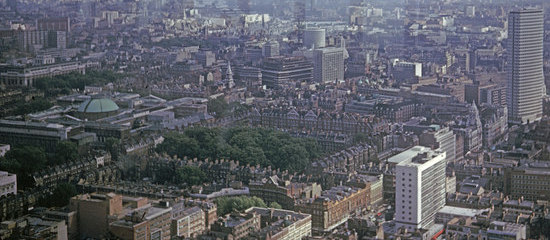
Bedford Square from the BT Tower in 1966

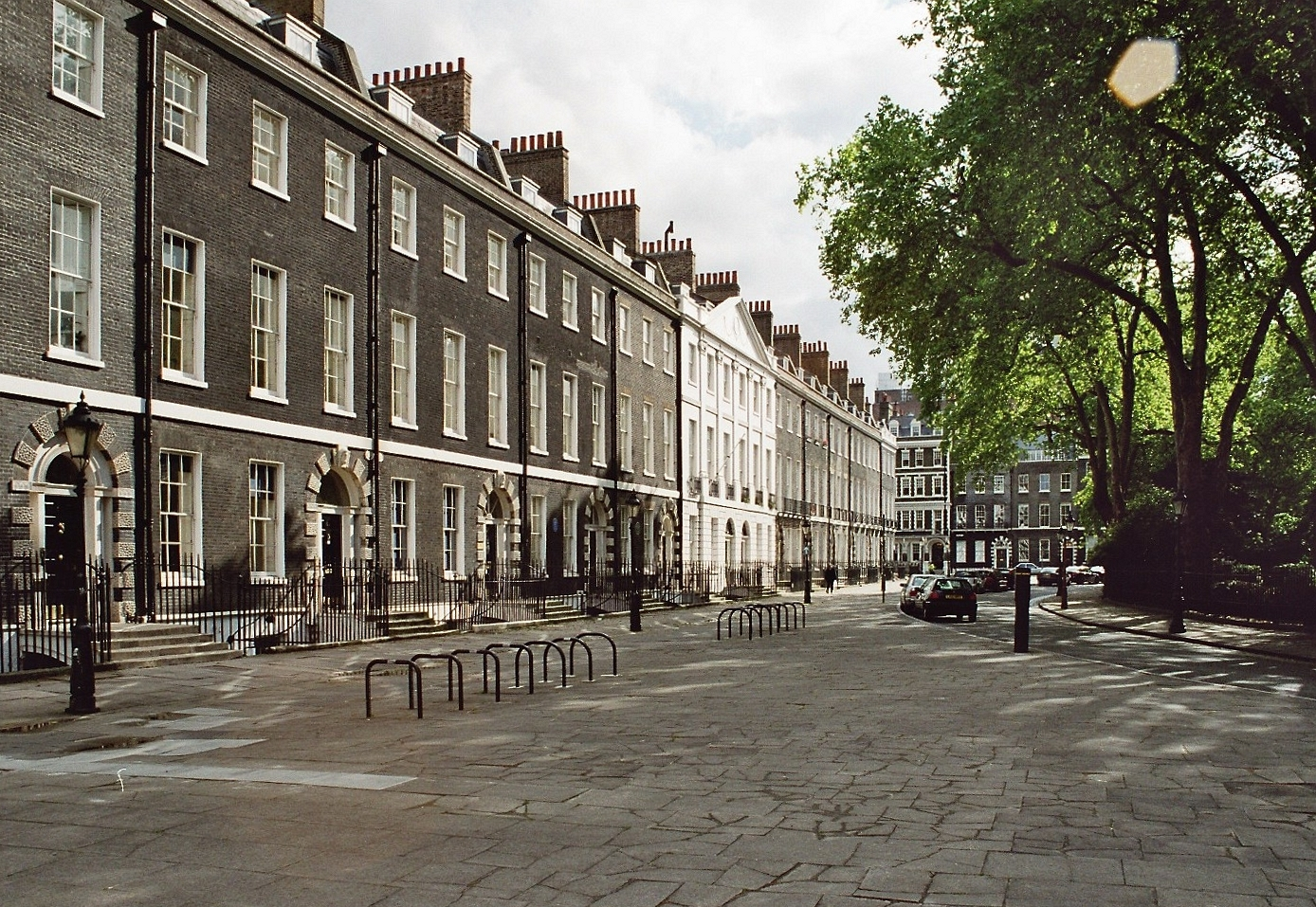
Bedford Square (2005)

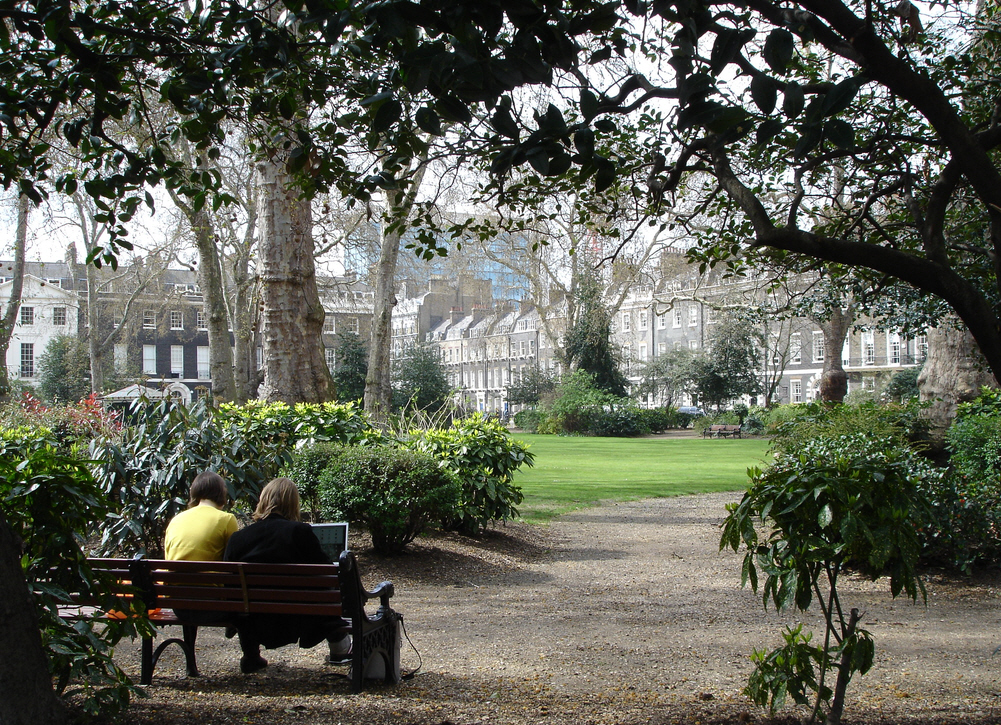
Bedford Square gardens

Built between 1775 and 1783 as an upper middle class residential area, the square has had many distinguished residents, including Lord Eldon, one of Britain's longest serving and most celebrated Lord Chancellors, who lived in the largest house in the square for many years. The square takes its name from the main title of the Russell family, the Dukes of Bedford, who owned much of the land in what is now Bloomsbury.

The architect Thomas Leverton is known to have designed some of the houses, although he may not have been responsible for all of them.

The building agreements for Bedford Square were signed by the trustees of the late Duke of Bedford and William Scott and Robert Grews, the builders, in 1776. The first leases, for the entire west side (Nos. 28–39), were granted in November 1776. It seems unlikely that these dozen houses were built within 11 months so building probably started in 1775. Except for No. 46, the south side leases were granted in 1777, the east side in 1777 and 1778 (except Nos. 1 and 10), and the north side in 1781 and 1782 (except Nos. 24–27, granted in 1777). No. 11, which stands in Gower Street but has always been considered part of the square, had a separate building agreement of 1781 and was leased in June 1783. This section was designed and built by Peter Matthias Van Gelder.

The leases were granted by the estate once the shells were built but with internal finishing still to be carried out. No. 23 was the last house to be occupied, its owner moving in during the last quarter of 1784.

The delay in finishing the building of the square can be put down in part to the shortage of money during the American War of Independence. Loans were granted by the trustees of the estate to the builders in order to finance building work from November 1777.

=== Number 1 ===
Number 1 Bedford Square is one of the great terraced houses of Georgian London and by far the best house in the square. Sir John Summerson described it as a "particularly fine house" in 1945.

Number 1 is almost certainly the work of the architect Thomas Leverton (1743-1824). By his own admission Leverton designed the interiors of both Numbers 6 and 13 Bedford Square and a number of details in those houses are repeated here. Although it sits outside the uniform symmetrical east side of the square, it has always been part of it and appropriately has always been numbered 1. The house is distinguished by its central entrance, rare for a three bay Georgian terraced house because such an arrangement required an ingenious plan to accommodate the staircase. The front door leads into an entrance hall which is flanked by two separate spaces, an anteroom to the right and the fine stone staircase to the left. With the staircase in the front of the house, Leverton was able to design full width rooms to the rear half which took full advantage of the view over the established gardens of the British Museum. There is a particularly fine decorative plaster ceiling in the first floor rear room.

The house was threatened with demolition by the British Museum in 1860, along with Numbers 2 and 3 and the fourteen houses to the south in Bloomsbury Street, but nothing came of the museum's plans. Then in the early 1930s a new building was planned which would stand only 20 feet from the rear elevation of Number 1. The threat produced an article in Country Life that heralded the house as "a masterpiece of English architecture" and of "exceptional merit". Support came from Sir Edwin Lutyens, former resident of Number 31 Bedford Square for three years from 1915, who described the house as a "most interesting house ... of exceptional quality". The British Museum's Duveen Gallery was built shortly before the Second World War and today its plain brick flank wall is the view from the house rather than the gardens of the museum, which was such an important consideration in Thomas Leverton's original designs for the house.

== Conservation ==
Bedford Square is one of the best preserved set pieces of Georgian architecture in London, but most of the houses have now been converted into offices. Numbers 1–10, 11, 12–27, 28–38 and 40–54 are Grade I listed buildings.

=== Garden ===
The central garden remains private, but is opened to the public as part of the London Open Gardens Weekend. The square is Grade II* listed on the Register of Historic Parks and Gardens.

== Former occupants ==
No. 1
Sir Lyonel Lyde Bt., was the first occupier of the building, for ten years until his death in 1791.
No. 4
Paul Weidlinger, structural engineer
No. 6
Lord Eldon, Lord Chancellor
No. 8
Frederick Warne & Norman Warne, publishers, of Frederick Warne & Co., who published the Beatrix Potter books
No. 10
Samuel Lyde (brother of Sir Lyonel at No. 1)
Charles Gilpin, MP
No. 11
Henry Cavendish, scientist
No. 13
Harry Ricardo, engine designer, born at the house
No. 19
New College of the Humanities, the higher education institution founded by A. C. Grayling, was located here from 2012 to 2021.
No. 22
Johnston Forbes-Robertson, actor
No. 26
The National Council for Voluntary Organisations' headquarters were at No. 26 from 1928 to 1992.
No. 30
Jonathan Cape, publishing company
No. 35
Thomas Hodgkin, physician, reformer and philanthropist
No. 35
Thomas Wakley, founder of The Lancet
No. 36
Thomas Wilkinson King, pathologist
No. 41
William Butterfield, architect
Sir Anthony Hope Hawkins, novelist
No. 44
Ottoline Morrell, socialite
Margot Asquith, wife of the Prime Minister H. H. Asquith
No. 47

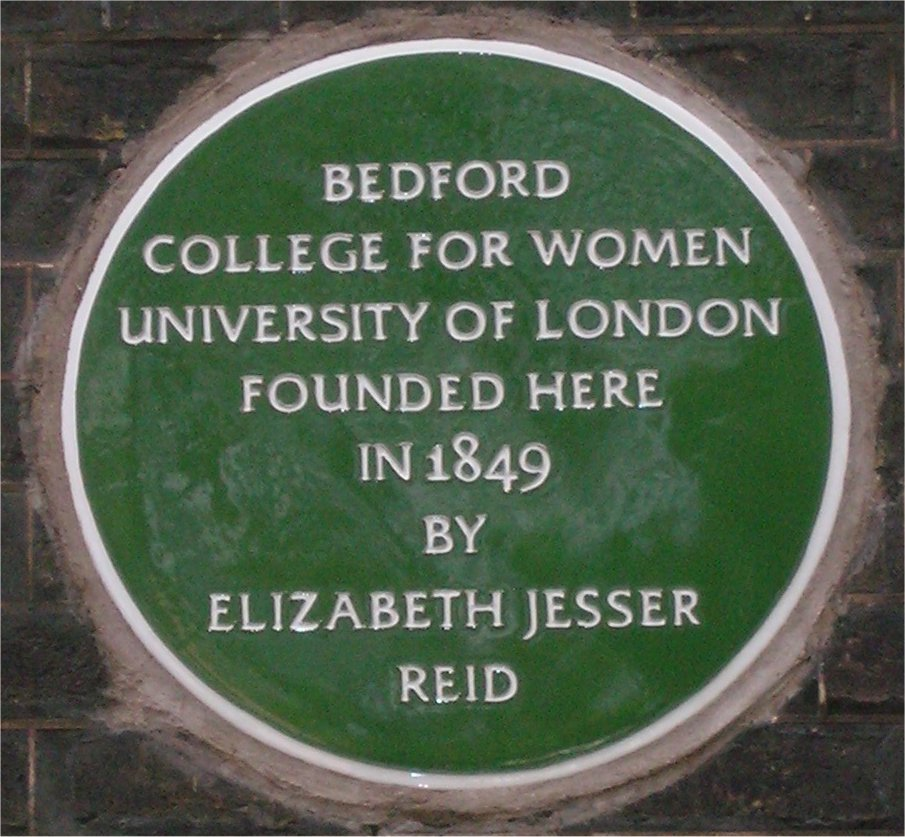
Green plaque at No. 47

Bedford College, the first place for female higher education in Britain, was originally located here. It was founded by Elizabeth Jesser Reid (1789–1866), who took a lease on No. 47 and opened the Ladies College in Bedford Square. She sought to provide a liberal, non-sectarian education for women, something no other institution in the United Kingdom provided at the time. It was later named after Bedford Square.
No. 48
Elizabeth Jesser Reid, anti-slavery activist and founder of Bedford College for Women
No. 49
Francis Walker, entomologist; before that Ram Mohan Roy, Indian scholar and reformer
No. 52
Used as the contestants' house in the 2010 series of The Apprentice
No. 53
Haydn Brown, surgeon and psychotherapist

== See also ==
Other squares on the Bedford Estate in Bloomsbury included:

- Bloomsbury Square
- Gordon Square
- Russell Square
- Tavistock Square
- Torrington Square
- Woburn Square
- List of eponymous roads in London

== Blue plaques ==
A number of houses have blue plaques recording famous residents:

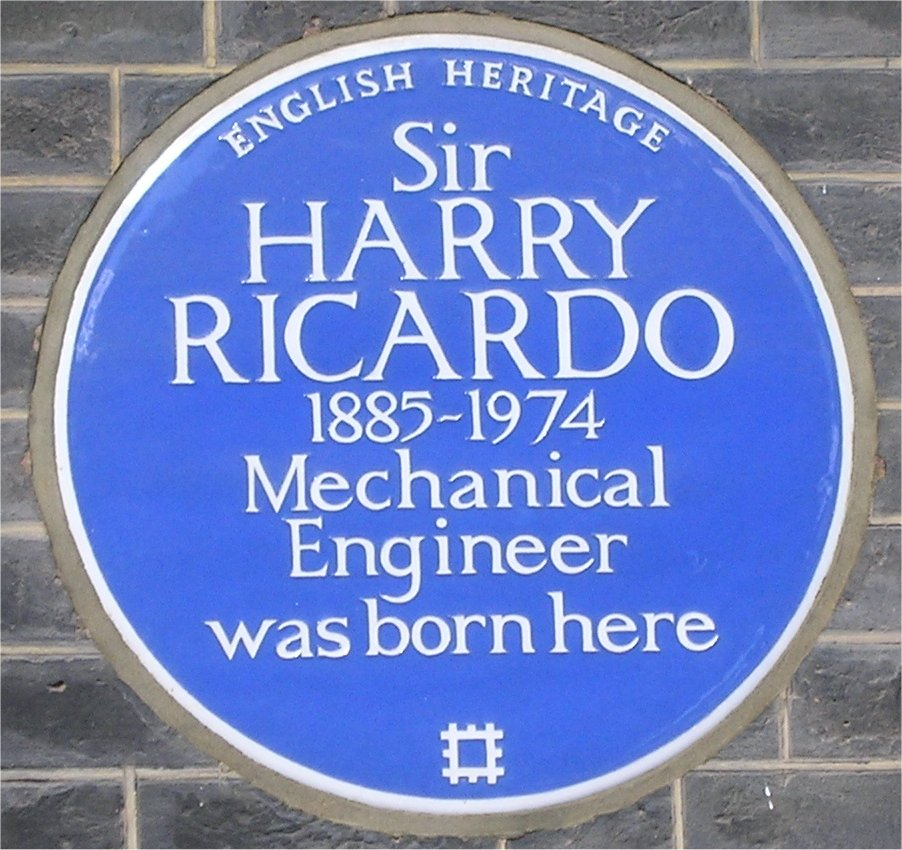
Harry Ricardo

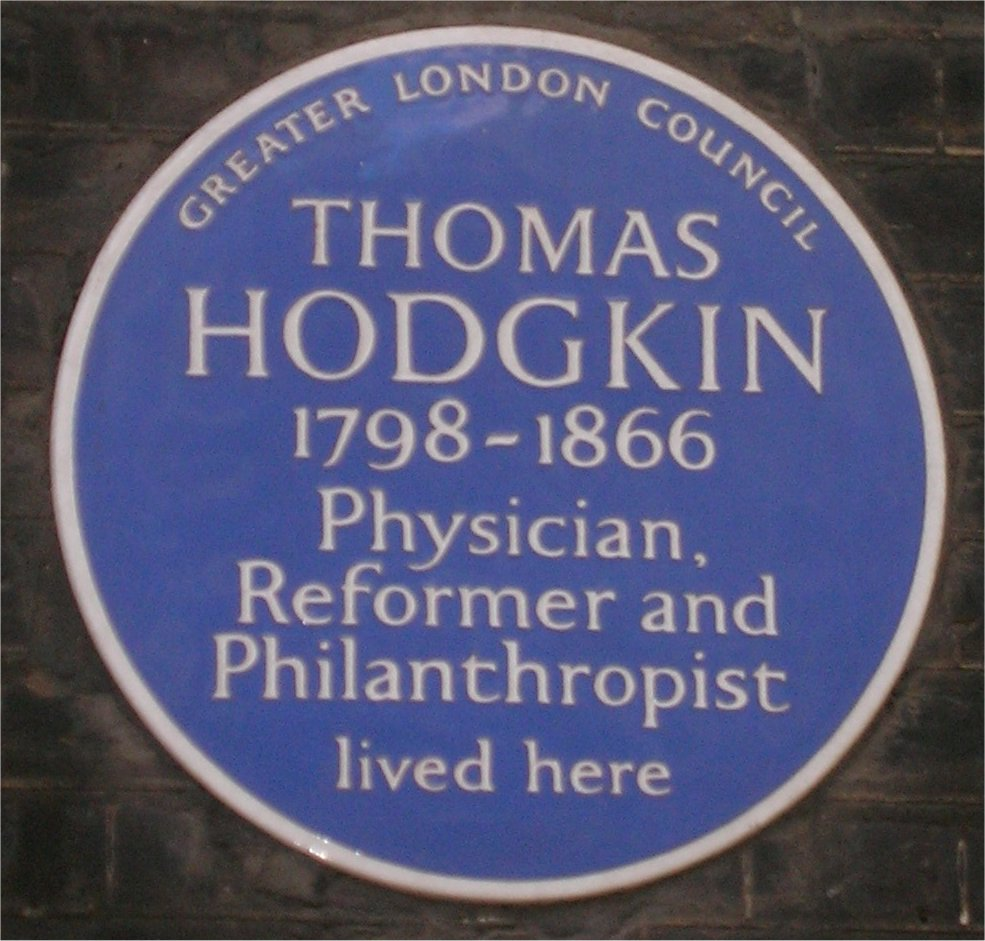
Thomas Hodgkin

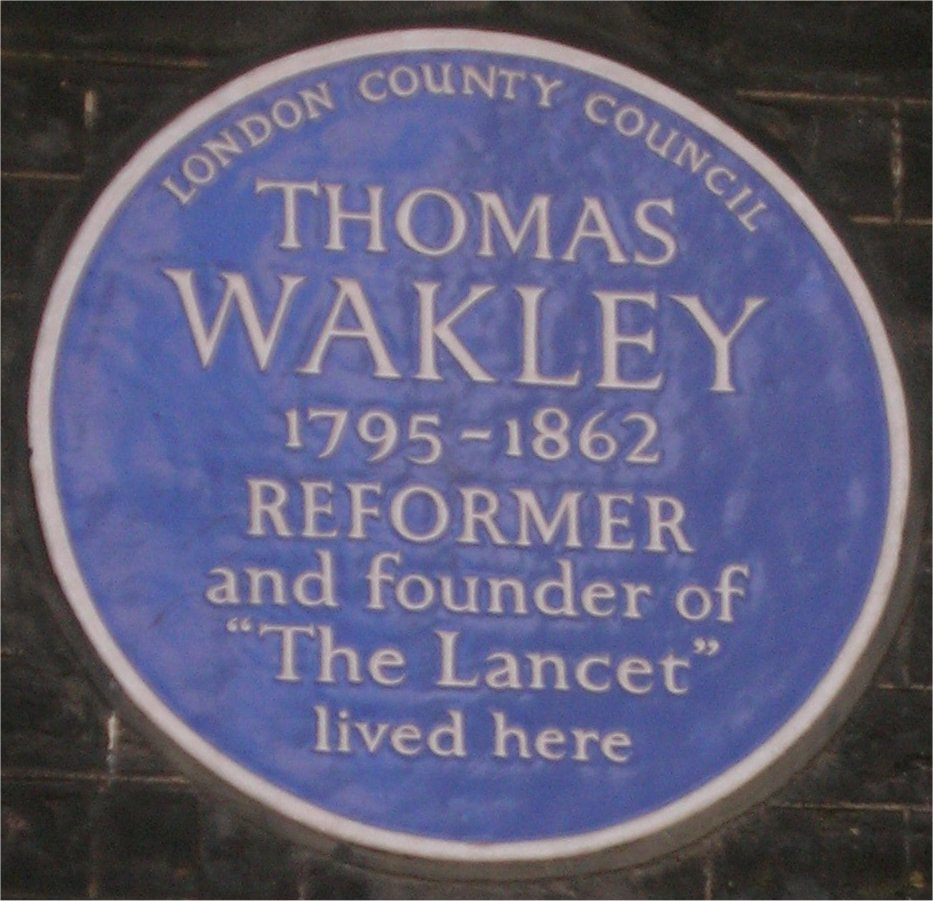
Thomas Wakley

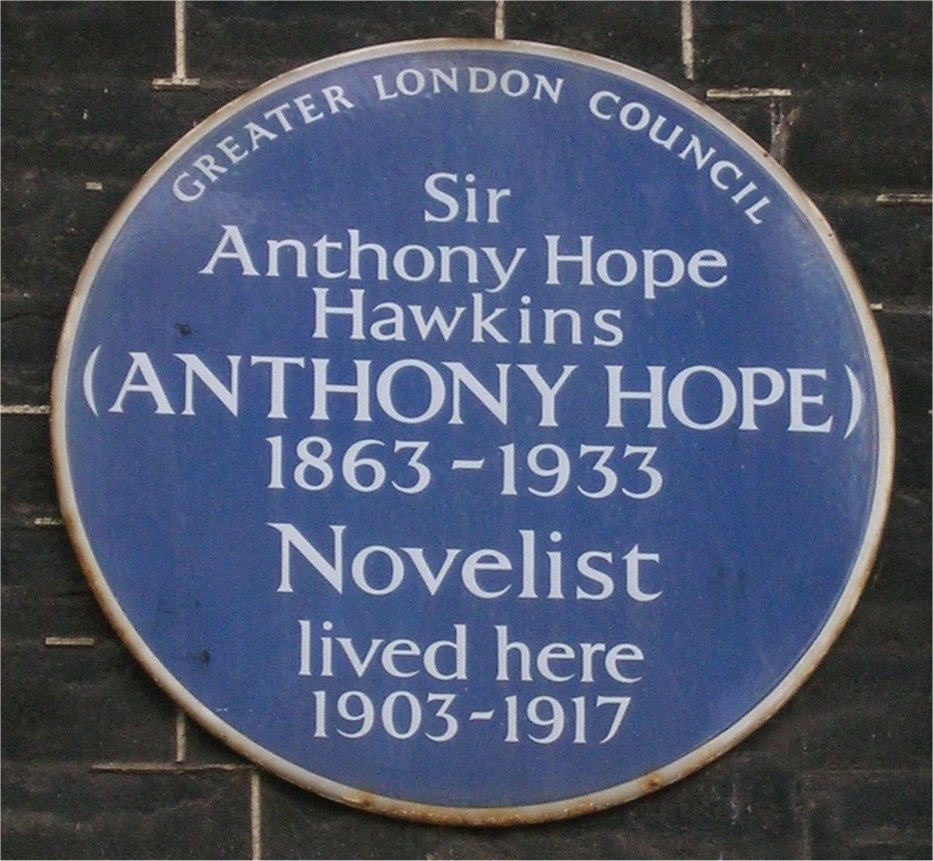
Anthony Hope Hawkins

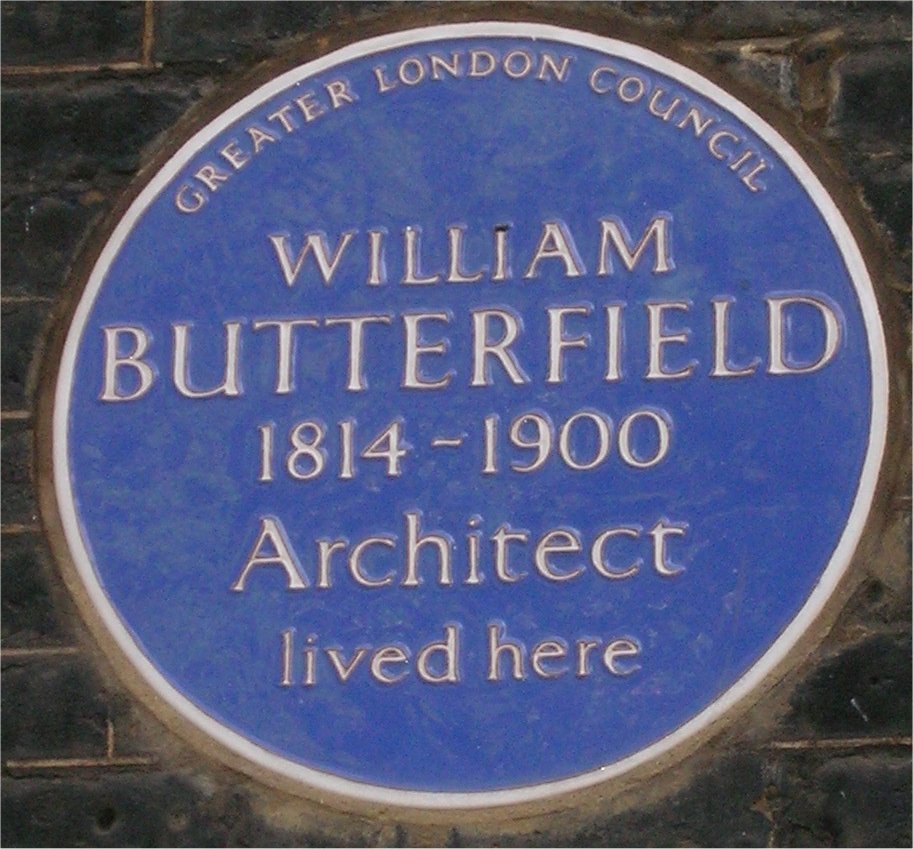
William Butterfield

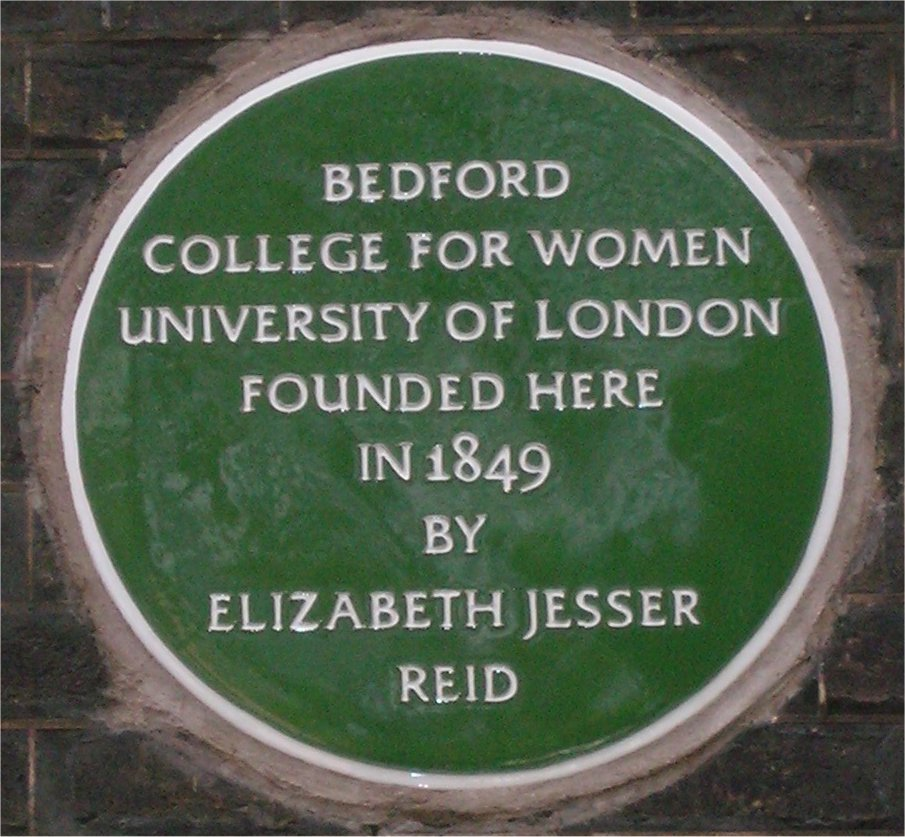
Elizabeth Jesser Reid

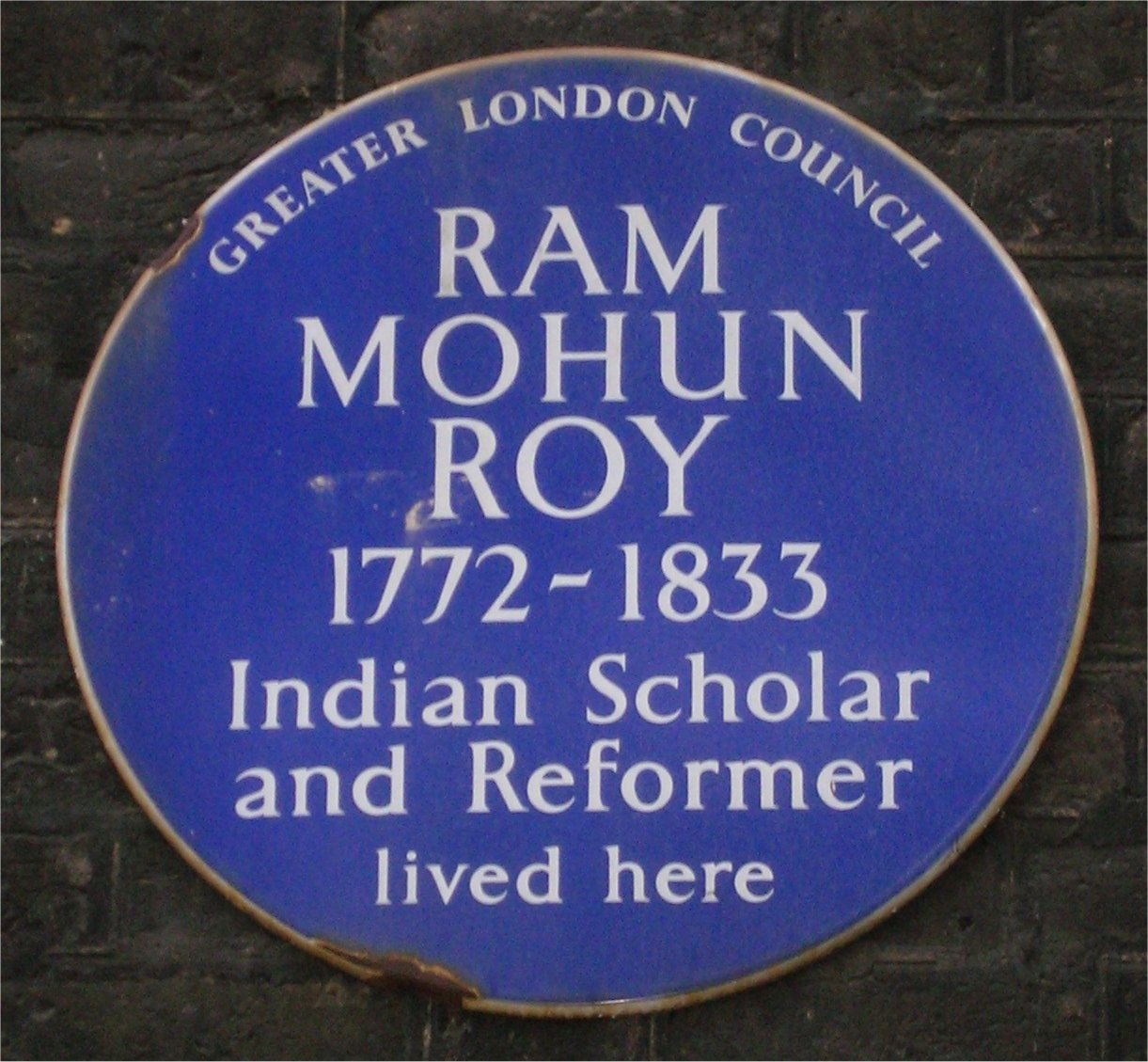
Ram Mohan Roy

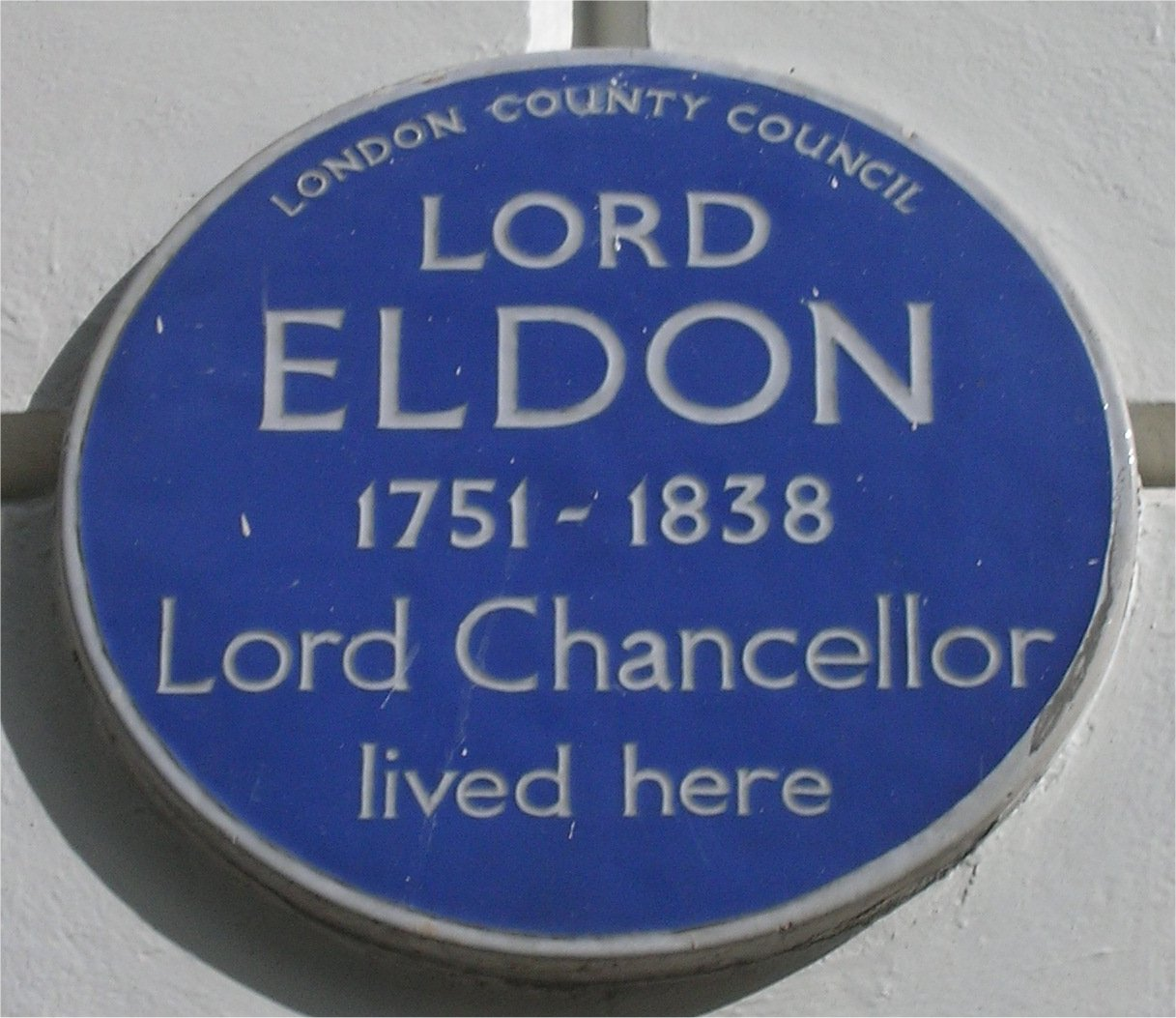
Lord Eldon

- Plaquemap.com London blue plaque scheme — For exact location of these plaques within the square.
