= Chapel of the Assumption Convent =

Coordinates: 51°30′00″N 0°11′25″W

- Maria Assumpta Chapel
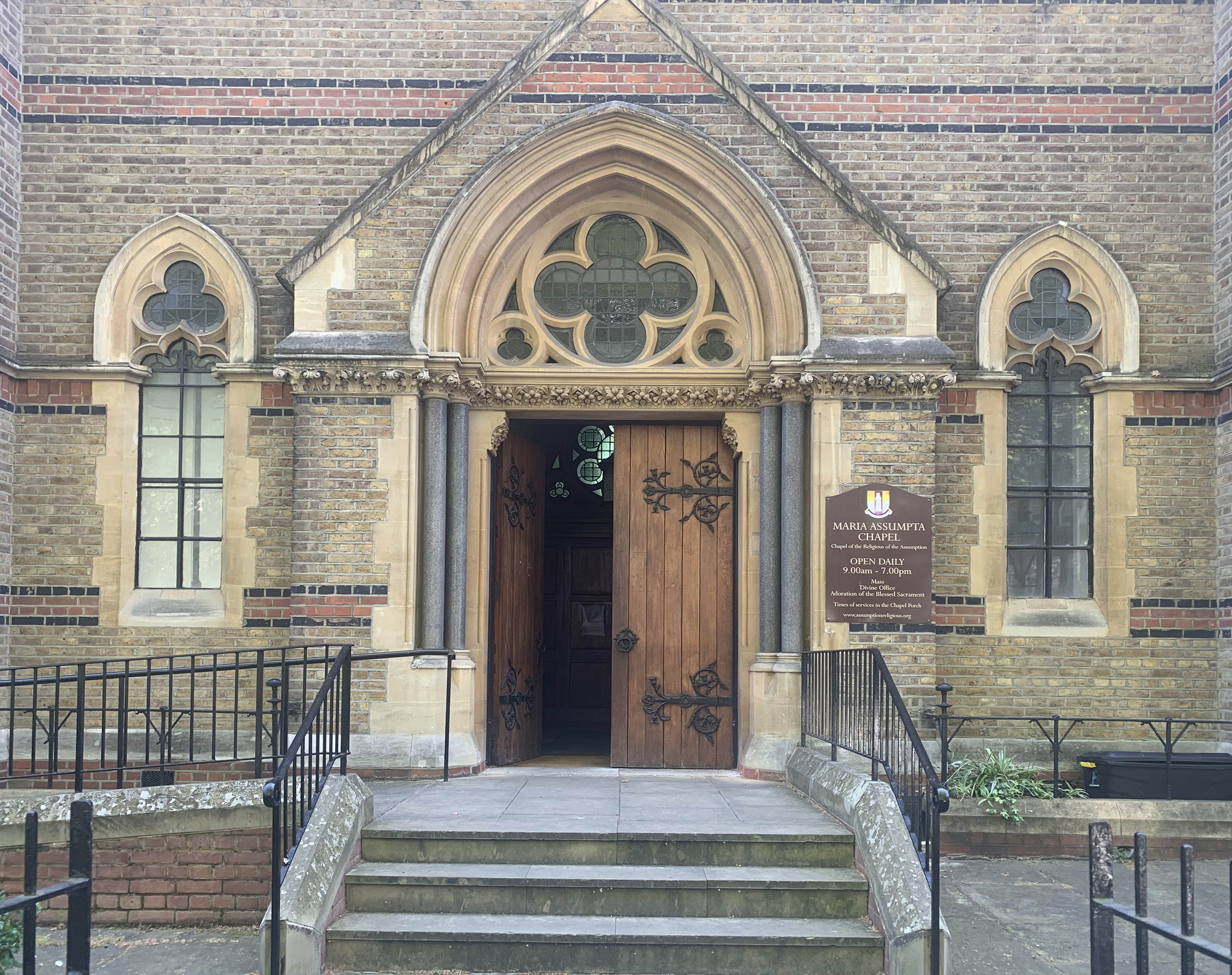
- Location: Kensington Square W8 5HP, London, England
- Denomination: Roman Catholic

History
- Status: Chapel
- Dedication: Assumption of Mary

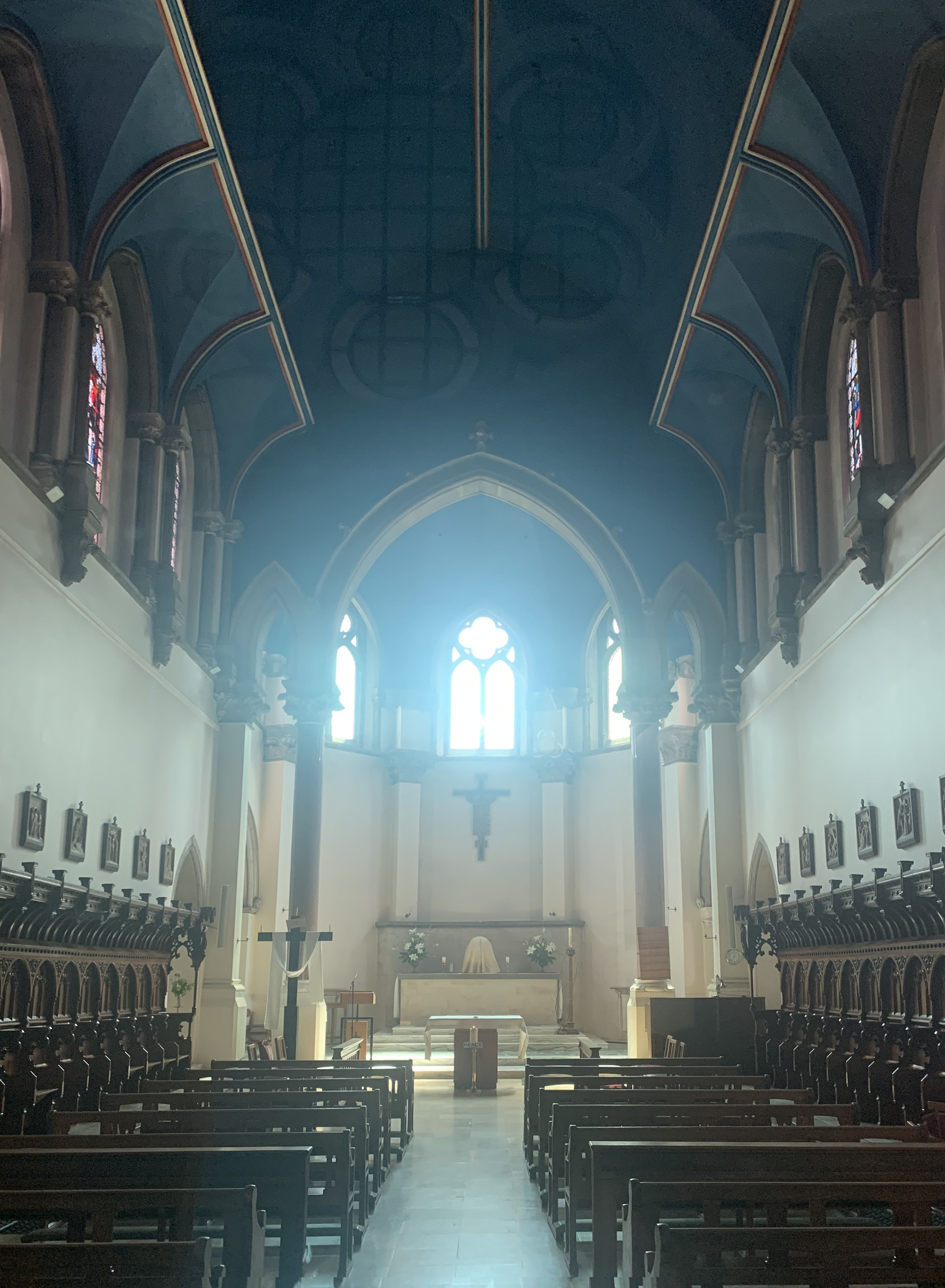
Chapel of the Assumption Convent interior

The Chapel of the Assumption Convent, also known as Maria Assumpta Chapel, is a 19th-century Roman Catholic convent chapel located in Kensington Square, London. It was built in 1875 in the Gothic style in yellow brick with red and black brick and stone trimmings. It became a Grade II listed building on 7 November 1984. It is part of the Roman Catholic Parish of Kensington.
