= Frederick Warne =

English publishing company founder (1825–1901)

Frederick Warne (13 October 1825 – 17 November 1901) was a British publisher, founder of Frederick Warne & Co.

== Early life and career ==
Warne was born in Westminster in 1825, sixth and youngest son of the twelve children of Edmund Warne, a builder, and his wife Matilda. After being privately educated in Soho, at the age of fourteen, he joined his brother William Henry Warne (d. 1859), and his brother-in-law George Routledge, in the retail bookselling business which Routledge had founded in 1836 in Ryder's Court, Leicester Square. Routledge established a publishing business in 1843, and in 1851 Warne became a partner in the firm, which was then styled Routledge & Co.; the name was changed to Routledge, Warne & Routledge in 1858 on Routledge's son, Robert Warne Routledge, becoming a partner. From 1851 to 1865, Warne was largely identified with the success of the firm.

In 1865, on the advice of the publisher George Smith, of Smith, Elder & Co., Warne began an independent publishing career; he was joined by Edward James Dodd (a lifelong friend and colleague at Routledge's), and by A. W. Duret, who left the firm of Dalziel Brothers to join him. An American branch was established in New York in 1881.

== Chandos Classics, Nuttall's Dictionary ==
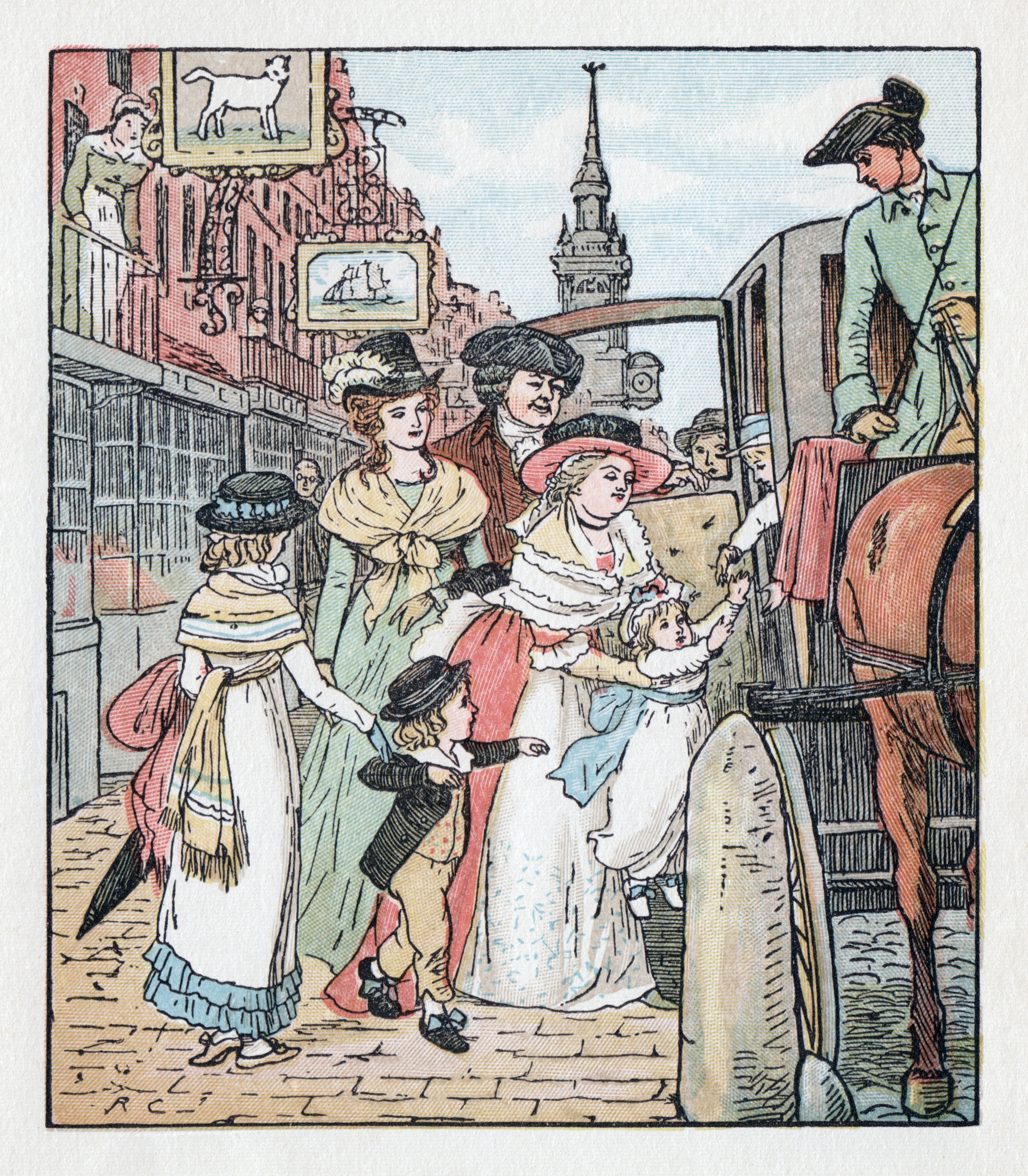
One of the illustration by Randolph Caldecott in The Diverting History of John Gilpin, published by Frederick Warne (1878).

Warne effectively emulated Routledge's ambition to popularise well-regarded literature. In 1868 he inaugurated The Chandos Classics: there were 154 titles in the series, and five million copies were sold. The series included an edition of Shakespeare which sold 340,000 copies. Nuttall's Dictionary, which was originally published by Routledge, Warne & Routledge in 1863, was first issued by Warne in January 1867, when 668,000 copies were soon sold. In 1886 a revised edition appeared, which sold nearly one million copies by 1911.

== Children's books ==
Warne was active in the publication of coloured picture books for children. He inaugurated a new era between 1870 and 1880 by his issue of the Aunt Louisa books, which were followed by new editions of Edward Lear's A Book of Nonsense, by the children's books (1878–1885) of Randolph Caldecott, and later by the works of Kate Greenaway and Walter Crane. In the field of fiction Warne issued Benjamin Disraeli's novels before their transfer to Messrs. Longman in 1870, and published in London most of Frances Hodgson Burnett's novels, including Little Lord Fauntleroy (1886).

== Magazines ==
He also first introduced to the English reading public the three American magazines The Century Magazine, St. Nicholas Magazine, and Scribner's Monthly.

== Later life ==
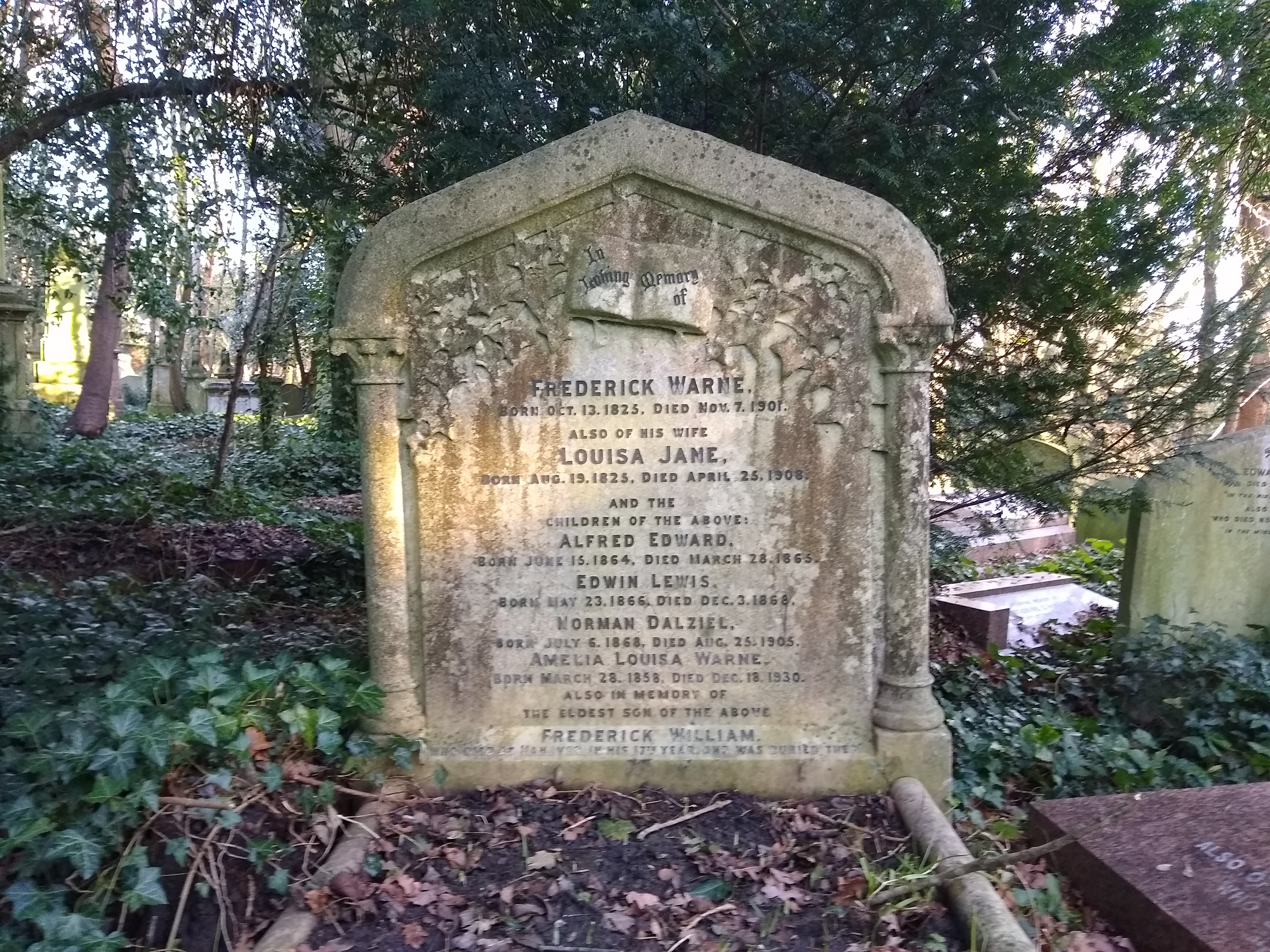
The Warne Family Grave in Highgate Cemetery (West Side)

In 1895, Warne and Dodd, his business partner, left the business (Duret had retired in 1879), and he was succeeded by his three surviving sons, Harold Edmund, William Fruing and Norman. He died at his home, 8 Bedford Square, on 7 November 1901, and was buried at Highgate Cemetery.

He married on 6 July 1852, Louisa Jane, daughter of William Fruing of Jersey: they had seven sons and three daughters. Three sons and two daughters survived him.

== Sources ==
Attribution

- This article incorporates text from a publication now in the public domain: Owen, William Benjamin (1912). "Warne, Frederick". In Lee, Sidney (ed.). Dictionary of National Biography (2nd supplement). Vol. 3. London: Smith, Elder & Co. pp. 594–595.
