= Haydn Brown =

British surgeon and psychotherapist

- Born: 1864
- Died: 3 January 1936 (aged 71–72); Bedford Square, Bloomsbury
- Occupations: Surgeon, psychotherapist

Haydn Brown (1864 – 3 January 1936) L.R.C.P., L.R.C.S. was a British surgeon and psychotherapist who promoted controversial naturopathic techniques to treat disease. Brown was notable for having his name removed twice from the Medical Register by the General Medical Council.

== Biography ==
Brown was educated at University of Edinburgh Medical School and practiced as a neurological specialist. He was a surgeon for the R.A.M.C. during the South African War. Brown promoted a controversial type of suggestion therapy termed "neuroinduction" which he stated could treat many diseases and even make benign tumours disappear and secondary carcinomatous nodules regress. Brown abandoned general practice to promote his own naturopathic techniques to treat disease. In 1919, Brown authored Advanced Suggestion (Neuroinduction) which reported successful results of his neuroinduction technique which consisted of relaxation, suggestion and laying on of hands to treat practically all diseases including cancer, cardiovascular disease, skin diseases and surgical cases. Reviewers in medical journals were not convinced by Brown's neuroinduction technique and described it as an "esoteric procedure".

In 1924, Brown was removed from the Medical Register for authoring a controversial article on maternal mortality and natural childbirth. The article published in the John Bull newspaper entitled Childbirth: Amazing New Discovery! with his name and portrait, advocated a "wonderful new method of childbirth in which pain is reduced to a minimum". Brown criticized conventional medical practice and promoted a method called "autonomous relaxation" in which the patient, under the doctor's hands and suggestion is made to relax her nervous tension thereby giving the body the best way to perform its natural functions, including childbirth. Brown stated that his method was "being discouraged as a result of the hide-bound conservatism of the leaders of the profession" but it could reduce a third of maternal mortality. The General Medical Council considered the article an advertisement for his own method and stated that Brown was "guilty of infamous conduct in a professional respect" and removed his name from the Medical Register. Brown's name was restored to the Medical Register a year later.

In 1929, Brown's name was removed from the Medical Register again because of controversial advertisements for his "autonomous relaxation" technique to cure asthma in a series of articles for the Daily Record newspaper. Although his name did not appear in the articles, asthma patients had been referred to him by the editor and Brown treated some of them for a fee. The Council concluded that Brown was guilty of obtaining patients from the publication of advertisements to promote his own techniques. The Royal College of Surgeons of Edinburgh took no action against Brown and he retained his diplomas of L.R.C.P and L.R.C.S. He was a Fellow of the Royal Society of Medicine and the Royal Institute of Public Health.

Brown authored many books on health and medical topics. As an independent medical researcher he authored two books attacking medical organization, Modern Medical Methods (1925) and Fighting for Life (1929). He died from pneumonia at his home in Bedford Square, Bloomsbury.

== Selected publications ==
- Economics, Anaesthetics and Antiseptics in the Practice of Midwifery (1897)
- The Secret of Good Health and Long Life (1898)
- Advice To Single Women (1899)
- Worry: And How to Avoid It (1900)
- Sleep and Sleeplessness (1910)
- The Secret of Human Power (1915)
- Breathing Power (1918)
- Advanced Suggestion (Neuroinduction) (1922)
- Sex Problems and Their Solution (1923)
- Fruit and Health (1924)
- Vitality and Diet (1924)
- Modern Medical Methods (1925)
- Asthma and Bronchitis: The Cure (1929)
- Fighting for Life: A Study of Bureaucracy (1929)
- Insomnia (1934)
- When Doctors Disagree: A Great Object Lesson (1934)

== See also ==
- Manual therapy
