= Miss Potter =

2006 film by Chris Noonan

- UK theatrical release poster
- Directed by: Chris Noonan
- Written by: Richard Maltby Jr.
- Produced by: Mike Medavoy; David Kirschner; Corey Sienega; Arnold W. Messer; David Thwaites
- Starring: Renée Zellweger; Lloyd Owen; Ewan McGregor; Bill Paterson; Emily Watson
- Cinematography: Andrew Dunn
- Edited by: Robin Sales
- Music by: Nigel Westlake
- Production companies: Phoenix Pictures; UK Film Council; BBC Films; Grosvenor Park Media; Isle of Man Film
- Distributed by: Momentum Pictures (United Kingdom); Metro-Goldwyn-Mayer; The Weinstein Company (United States); Summit Entertainment (International)
- Release dates: 3 December 2006 (London); 5 January 2007 (United Kingdom); 9 March 2007 (United States)
- Running time: 93 minutes
- Countries: United Kingdom; United States
- Language: English
- Budget: $30 million
- Box office: $35.8 million

Miss Potter is a 2006 biographical drama film directed by Chris Noonan. It is based on the life of children's author and illustrator Beatrix Potter, and combines stories from her own life with animated sequences featuring characters from her stories, such as Peter Rabbit. Scripted by Richard Maltby Jr., the director of the Tony Award-winning Broadway revue, Fosse, the film stars Renée Zellweger in the title role, Ewan McGregor as her publisher and fiancé, Norman Warne, and Lloyd Owen as solicitor William Heelis. Emily Watson stars as Warne's sister, Millie. Lucy Boynton also stars as the young Beatrix Potter and Justin McDonald appears as the young William Heelis. It was filmed in London (St Peter's Square (Hammersmith), Cecil Court (Westminster), Osterley Park and Covent Garden), the Isle of Man, Scotland and the Lake District.

Miss Potter received a limited release in the United States on 29 December 2006 so that the film could compete for the 2007 Academy Awards. The film was intended to be released generally on 12 January 2007, but Variety reported that The Weinstein Company had decided to push a wider release date until after the Academy Awards on 25 February 2007. The date seemed to fluctuate a number of times, but the Weinstein Company website ultimately listed its release date as 9 March. The film received positive reviews from critics, with praise directed towards Zellweger's performance, and grossed over $35.8 million worldwide. Zellweger was nominated for the Saturn Award for Best Actress and the Golden Globe Award for Best Actress – Motion Picture Comedy or Musical.

== Plot ==
London 1902 : Beatrix Potter and her chaperone, Miss Wiggin, visit the publishing house of Harold and Fruing Warne, who decide to publish her book The Tale of Peter Rabbit. While Beatrix is thrilled, the Warnes privately think the book is ridiculous and only agree to publish it because they promised their younger brother, Norman, a project.

Norman and Beatrix meet, and realise they share a vision for her work. As production of the book begins, Norman introduces Beatrix to his mother, and his unmarried sister, Millie, who befriends Beatrix. Tensions rise in the Potter household, as Beatrix's social-climbing mother, Helen, is unhappy about her daughter spending time in the company of tradesmen, and believes that the venture will fail.

However, sales are very successful, and Norman encourages Beatrix to submit other stories for publication. Eventually, Beatrix's father, Rupert, voices his support of Beatrix's career, after hearing about the popularity of her books from his friends at the Reform Club. Encouraged, Beatrix invites Norman and Millie to her family's Christmas party. Beatrix tells a story she is writing especially for Norman, "The Rabbits' Christmas Party", giving him a painting from the story as a present. Finally unchaperoned, Norman proposes to Beatrix, and she happily accepts.

Beatrix's parents disapprove of the match, but she stands firm, reminding her mother that both her grandfathers were tradesmen. Beatrix learns that not only can she survive on her own with her books, but that she is now a wealthy woman from her royalties. Her parents eventually suggest that Beatrix and Norman keep their engagement secret over summer, and promise that they can marry if their feelings remain unchanged after that. The Potters holiday in the Lake District, and Beatrix and Norman maintain a regular correspondence.

After a few days without a letter from Norman, Millie writes, saying that he is ill. Beatrix returns to London only to find that Norman has already died. Grieving, she shuts herself up in her room; she turns to her drawing, but discovers that her characters disappear off the page. Millie visits to comfort her, and Beatrix decides she must leave the family home.

She buys a farm in the Lake District and moves there to resume her work. She hires a farmhand to run the farm and finds comfort in her surroundings. Millie visits, returning the painting of The Rabbits' Christmas Party. With the help of her solicitor, William Heelis, Beatrix outbids developers at auctions and buys many other farms and land in the area to prevent them being built on.

Epilogue : Despite her mother's disapproval, Beatrix married William Heelis eight years after moving to the Lake District. Beatrix donated 4,000 acres (16.2 km^{2}; 6.3 sq mi) of farmland she had purchased to the British people through a land preservation trust, which now forms part of the Lake District National Park in North West England. Her stories became the best-selling children's books of all time.

== Cast ==
- Renée Zellweger as Beatrix Potter
  - Lucy Boynton as Young Beatrix
- Ewan McGregor as Norman Warne
- Bill Paterson as Rupert Potter
- Barbara Flynn as Helen Potter
- Lloyd Owen as William Heelis
  - Justin McDonald as Young Heelis
- Emily Watson as Millie Warne
- Matyelok Gibbs as Miss Wiggin
- Anton Lesser as Harold Warne
- David Bamber as Fruing Warne
- Phyllida Law as Mrs. Louisa Warne
- Judith Barker as Hilda
- Lynn Farleigh as Lady Sybil
- John Woodvine as Sir Nigel
- Jane How as Lady Armitage
- Geoffrey Beevers as Mr. Copperthwaite
- Clare Clifford as Mrs. Haddon-Bell
- Richard Mulholland as Ashton Clifford

== Production ==
The film was director Chris Noonan's first in 10 years (since he made Babe), having waited for many years until he finally found a script that inspired him. Cate Blanchett, who originally suggested Noonan for the role of director, was at one point set to star in the film but apologetically left the project when one of her other films was green-lit before this one. Zellweger ended up becoming an executive producer on the film because she was dissatisfied with the script and wanted to get more involved.

The film was first brought to Ewan McGregor's attention by Zellweger, who had kept in contact with him after collaborating on Down with Love. McGregor described the film as having a somewhat similar appeal as that film, and noted that he was familiar with Beatrix Potter's stories, which he read to his children. To prepare for the role, McGregor studied photographs of Norman Warne and visited the modern-day Warne publishing house. Zellweger read actual letters between Beatrix Potter and Norman Warne and Millie to prepare for the role, but had difficulty with the accent, which she said was very different from Bridget Jones'.

As there were no records of Beatrix Potter's speaking voice, they had to guess; ultimately the voice was softened so as not to irritate contemporary audiences with the tight, high voice a woman of Beatrix Potter's standing at that time may have had. Zellweger said that she had read a few of Beatrix Potter's stories growing up, but that she had never known anything about the woman herself. Noonan said that when growing up he had never read Beatrix Potter's stories, and that, "I was aware of her because of all that crockery with her characters on it."

The film used animated versions of Beatrix Potter's characters and illustrations, which were composited into the live-action shots. According to Chris Knott (who had previously worked on Who Framed Roger Rabbit), VFX supervisor on the film for Passion Pictures, they were given access to collections of Potter's original work to help them recreate it for the animations. Noonan said that it was hard to find anyone who still did cel animation, but did end up finding such a person in Alyson Hamilton, who already had a great deal of appreciation for Potter's work. Costumes for the film were designed by Academy Award winner Anthony Powell. The score for the film was composed by Nigel Westlake (who had previously worked with Noonan on Babe) although Rachel Portman was brought in to record some of the music for the Lake District scenes. Westlake was asked by Noonan during filming to come up with a waltz-like tune for some of their lyrics, and, with the collaboration of Mike Batt and Katie Melua, this same song was also turned into a pop song used in the end credits of the film.

== Reception ==
The film received positive reviews. As of June 2020, the film holds a 68% approval rating on review aggregator Rotten Tomatoes, based on 130 reviews with an average rating of 6.22 out of 10. The critics' consensus is that it is a "charming biopic that maintains its sweetness even in sadder moments."

== Songs ==
- "When You Taught Me How to Dance" - Performed by Katie Melua
- "Let Me Teach You How to Dance" - Performed by Ewan McGregor
