= Thomas Wilkinson King =

English pathologist

Thomas Wilkinson King (1809 – 26 March 1847) was an English pathologist and anatomist. He has been called "the father of endocrinology" because of a landmark paper he wrote about the thyroid gland while working at Guy's Hospital.

== Early life and education ==
King was born in 1809 and was educated in London and Paris. He became a doctor like his father, who practised in Dover, and began training at Guy's Hospital as a teenager in 1824. He was appointed curator of the Guy's Hospital museum, a position previously held by Thomas Hodgkin, in 1837, and three years later became a lecturer in comparative anatomy and comparative physiology. He also lectured in anatomical pathology and wrote prolifically in the Guy's Hospital Reports, particularly about cancer.

== Career ==
King has been called "the father of endocrinology" because of an important paper he wrote about the thyroid gland, where he proposed the concept of internal secretion of hormones into the bloodstream. The paper was published in the Guy's Hospital Reports in 1836, and fell into obscurity until it was discussed by Sir Humphry Rolleston at the Fitzpatrick Lecture in 1933. His paper described in detail the anatomy of the thyroid gland and theorised that, because of the thyroid's significant vascular supply and "peculiar" fluid, the blood vessels transported the thyroid's secretions throughout the body. He also proposed that the levels of thyroid secretions would vary during the day since the gland was subjected to periodic compression during chewing and movement of the nearby oesophagus, larynx and neck muscles.

== Later life and death ==
King was one of the original Fellows of the Royal College of Surgeons of England upon its establishment in December 1843. At that time, he was living and practising at 36 Bedford Square in London. He died of tuberculosis in 1847.
