= Norman Warne =

English editor (1868–1905)

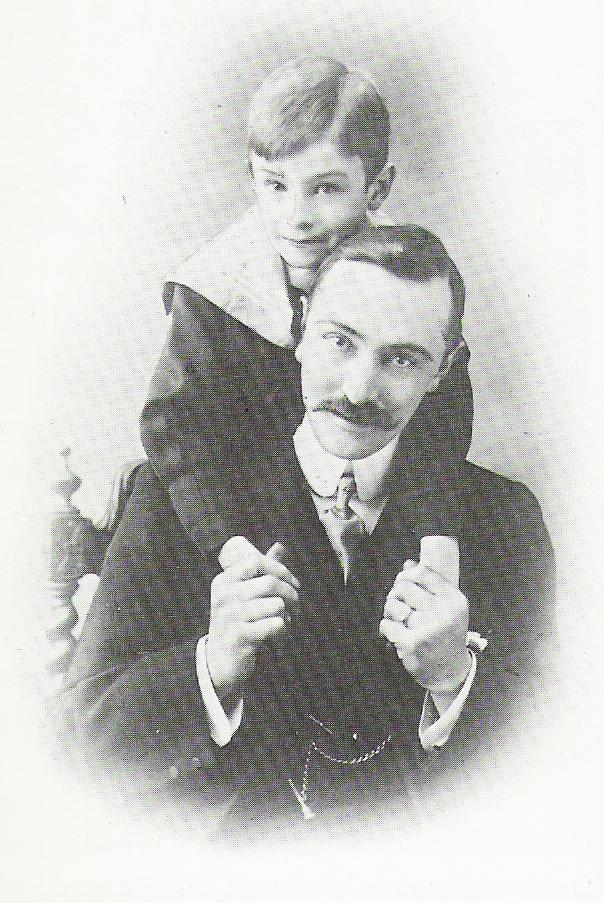
- Norman Warne and his nephew Fred, ca. 1900
- Born: Norman Dalziel Warne; 6 July 1868
- Died: 25 August 1905 (aged 37); Bedford Square, London
- Occupation: publisher

Norman Dalziel Warne (6 July 1868 – 25 August 1905) was the third son of publisher Frederick Warne, and joined his father's firm Frederick Warne & Co as an editor. In 1900, the company rejected Beatrix Potter's The Tale of Peter Rabbit, but eventually reconsidered and in October 1902, published the book to great success. Norman Warne became Potter's editor and they worked together on several subsequent books and related merchandise, such as soft toys and The Game of Peter Rabbit.

In 1904, Potter and Warne worked closely together to develop a tale about two mice and a doll's house. Potter began spending more time at the firm's offices and took several trips to Warne's home to sketch a doll's house he was constructing for his nieces. In July 1905 Warne proposed. Potter accepted, but on 25 August 1905, before a marriage could take place, Warne died suddenly of pernicious anaemia Potter remained in touch with Warne's sister Millie for many years, and his brothers Harold and Fruing became her editors. The relationship between Potter and Warne became the basis for the film Miss Potter (2006).

== Career and relationship with Beatrix Potter ==
In 1894, Frederick Warne retired from active management of the Bedford Street publishing firm bearing his name in London and ceded control to his three sons, Harold, Fruing, and Norman, before his death in 1905. Harold was a managing partner, Fruing was responsible for sales, and Norman for production and some sales. Norman Warne's brothers were both married men, but when the 35-year-old Potter met him in 1901 he was a 33-year-old bachelor living with his widowed mother and his unmarried sister Amelia ("Millie") in the family house in Bedford Square, Bloomsbury. Potter almost always dealt with Norman Warne during negotiations for the publication of Peter Rabbit and their terms of address had evolved from "Sir" and "Madam" to "Mr. Warne" and "Miss Potter" by the time a contract was signed in 1902.

In October 1902, The Tale of Peter Rabbit was published and Potter became a frequent visitor to Warne's offices at the same time. She arrived in the Potter carriage with the elderly family cook Elizabeth Harper (or other servant as chaperone) or her fellow illustrator and friend Gertrude Woodward. Potter and Warne were never alone in each other's company. Potter's letters reveal a friendship was developing between the author and her editor-publisher as they discussed possibilities for future tales (Squirrel Nutkin and Mr. Jeremy Fisher in particular) and the complexities of the printing process.

In 1903, Potter wrote to Warne that she was giving thought to a Peter Rabbit sequel to follow The Tailor of Gloucester and The Tale of Squirrel Nutkin but learned Norman had left London on a selling trip. She was disappointed when Harold Warne invited her to the offices to discuss her ideas. She abruptly declined his invitation and asked that her letters be forwarded to Norman. Harold Warne gently suggested she send the sequel for Norman Warne's review at his return. She did, and the tale was accepted for 1904 publication as The Tale of Benjamin Bunny. The Warnes wanted two books per annum from Potter, not only for commercial advantage but because she took an extraordinary amount of time to complete the illustrations. The second book for 1904 was yet to be determined when Potter left with her parents to summer at Fawe Park near Keswick. There she sketched backgrounds for Benjamin Bunny and returned to London in September. Norman left on another selling trip in November and Potter for a week's holiday in Hastings where she composed three tales. One was accepted as the companion piece to Benjamin Bunny and published as The Tale of Two Bad Mice.

The courtship between Potter and Warne was conducted through the medium of Two Bad Mice and the letters surrounding it. She had come to call him "Johnny Crow" in line with his nieces. Both took delight in developing the tale of the mice. Warne had a hand in the mechanics of the illustrations (supplying Potter with the dolls, the toy food, and the photographs of the dollhouse), but Potter's letters, though circumspect, reveal her increasingly intimate and loving relationship with him and her growing frustration with parents who dreaded bringing into the family a man they considered their social inferior and a man who would take their housekeeper, nurse, and general factotum away from them. She responded positively to Warne's growing appreciation of her professionalism and her artistry; they discussed the development of her works step-by-step and she realised his criticism and his advice always improved the product.

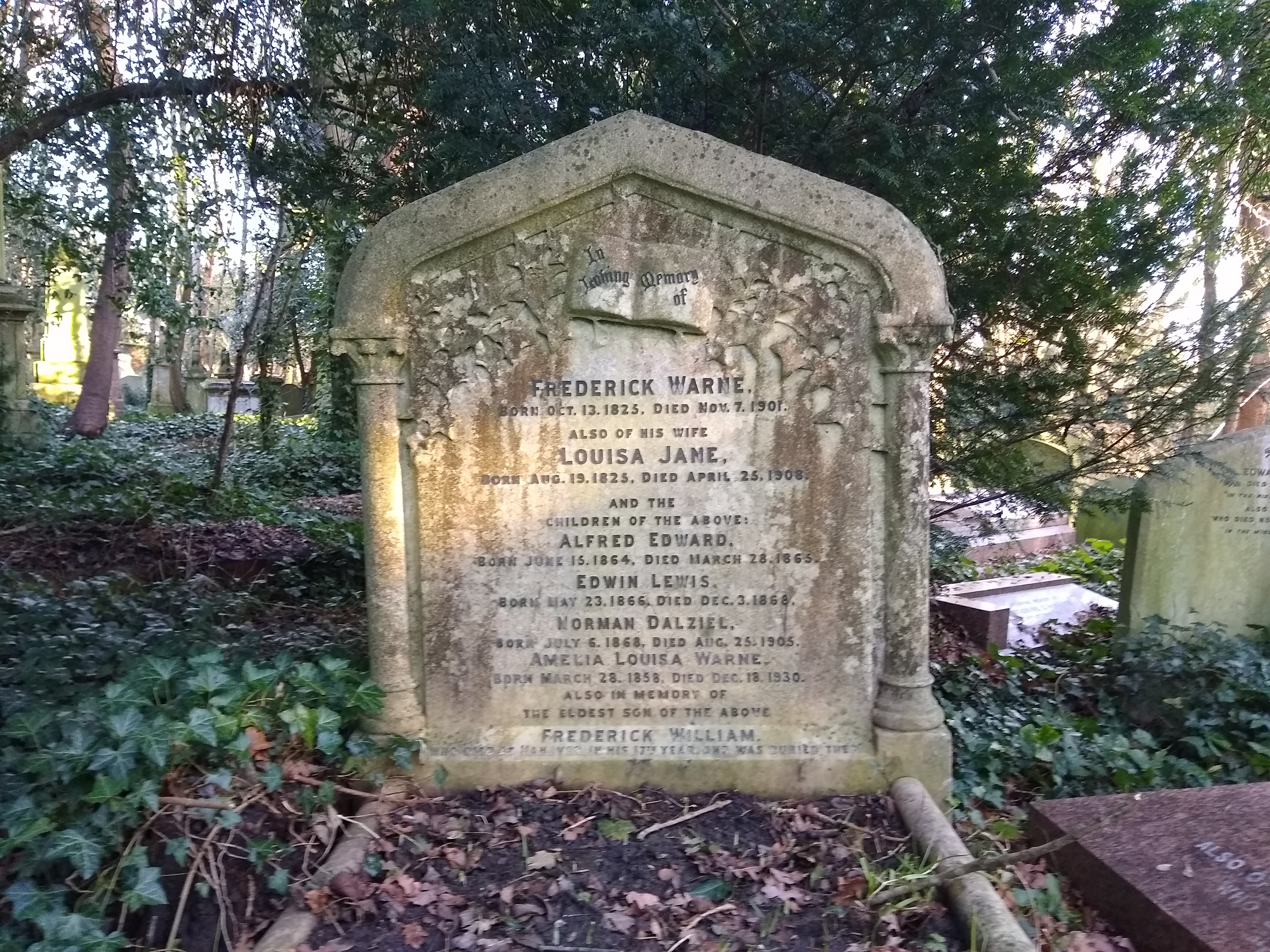
Norman Warne's resting place in the Warne Family Grave in Highgate Cemetery (West Side)

In July 1905, Potter was engaged in correcting proofs for The Tale of Mrs. Tiggy-Winkle when Warne proposed marriage by letter on 25 July. Potter accepted the same day. A firestorm was unleashed in the Potter household: her parents vehemently objected to her union with a man they considered their social inferior, a tradesman without professional accomplishment. Potter regarded her parents objections as hypocritical and unreasonable because both sets of her grandparents had been tradesmen engaged in the cotton trade. At some point, Warne and Potter exchanged rings but Potter ceded to her parents' demands and did not make a public announcement. The engagement would be a family secret. Meanwhile, Warne returned from a sales trip to Manchester very ill, and was ordered to complete bed rest on 29 July. Potter last saw him on 22 July before leaving on 4 August for a sketching trip to Wales. Warne died in his bedroom in Bedford Square on 25 August of pernicious anemia brought on by lymphatic leukaemia, a disease difficult to diagnose at that time. He was 37. His burial was 29 August in Highgate Cemetery in London. Potter had been summoned to London on the 25th by the Warnes but did not arrive until the 27th. Her grief was immeasurable. In December she sent Warne's sister Millie a watercolour sketch of a barley field she had completed the evening before Warne's death: "I try to think of the golden sheaves, and harvest," she wrote, "he did not live long but fulfilled a useful happy life."

== Proposed plaque ==
In 2012, a proposal to erect a plaque at Warne's former home in Bedford Square honouring his memory was turned down by English Heritage, who said they have funding to erect only twelve to fifteen plaques a year. A further attempt was also turned down in 2024.
