= Pleydell-Bouverie =

Pleydell-Bouverie is an English surname, and may refer to:

- Edward Pleydell-Bouverie (1818–1889), British politician
- Jacob Pleydell-Bouverie, 2nd Earl of Radnor (1750–1828), Lord Lieutenant of Berkshire
- Duncombe Pleydell-Bouverie (1780–1850), British admiral and Whig politician.
- Jacob Pleydell-Bouverie, 4th Earl of Radnor (1815–1889), Lord Lieutenant of Wiltshire
- William Pleydell-Bouverie, 5th Earl of Radnor (1841–1900), MP and Treasurer of the Household
- Jacob Pleydell-Bouverie, 6th Earl of Radnor (1868–1930), Lord Lieutenant of Wiltshire
- William Pleydell-Bouverie, 7th Earl of Radnor (1895–1968), High Sheriff of Hertfordshire
- Jacob Pleydell-Bouverie, 8th Earl of Radnor (1927–2008), earl in the Peerage of Great Britain
- Katherine Pleydell-Bouverie (1895–1985), English potter
- Timothy Pleydell-Bouverie (born 1987), British historian and journalist
