= Thomas Young (developer) =

English woodcarver and property developer

Thomas Young (c. 1650 – ?) was an English woodcarver and property developer, best known for Kensington Square.

It is thought that he was born in Devon. Young was apprenticed to a joiner and woodcarver, and was admitted to the Joiners' Company as a freeman in 1670, at the age of about 20.

In 1685, he acquired 14 acres of land in Kensington which he sought to develop, and as he later described it in 1701, "did sett out and appoint a considerable part thereof to be built into a large Square of large and substantial Houses fit for ye Habitacion of persons of good Worth and Quality, with Courts and Yards before and Gardens lying backwards". This was Kensington Square. From 1692 onwards, the central garden was laid out.

Young attempted to develop Kensington Square alone, but had financial problems, which led him to sell plots to other developers, and to borrow more money. He was eventually jailed in the King's Bench Prison for debt. He was backed by Thomas Sutton, who persuaded him to give more equity to Sutton to prevent other creditors from seizing his remaining land, and to help obtain his release. However, after Young left prison, he was not able to repay his loan to Sutton, got into debt again, and spent almost ten years in Fleet Prison. He ended up having to bring a case against Sutton.

Young Street, which runs north–south from Kensington High Street to Kensington Square, is named after him.
