= Kensington Square =

Garden square in Kensington, London, England

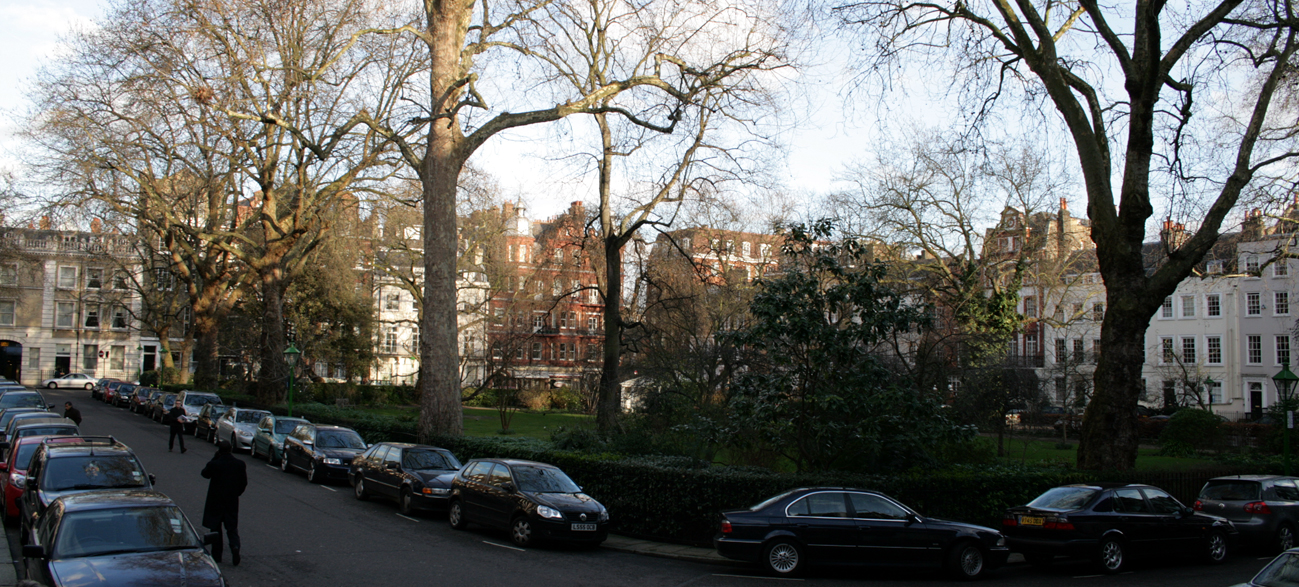
- Looking west across Kensington Square from the southeastern corner
- Interactive map of Kensington Square
- Length: 0.2 mi (0.32 km)
- Postal code: W8
- Coordinates: 51.5006°N 0.1900°W

Construction
- Inauguration: 1685

Kensington Square is a garden square in Kensington, London, W8. It was built from 1692 on land acquired for the purpose in 1685 and is the oldest such square in Kensington. The houses facing, Nos. 1–45, are listed Grade II for their architectural/historic merit.

== History ==
In 1685, Thomas Young, a woodcarver, acquired land in Kensington which he sought to develop, and as he later described it in 1701, "did sett out and appoint a considerable part thereof to be built into a large Square of large and substantial Houses fit for the Habitacion of persons of good Worth and Quality, with Courts and Yards before and Gardens lying backwards".

In London, St. James's Square, Soho Square and Golden Square are a few years older, but in contrast with these Kensington Square still retains its residential character.

== Garden ==
The communal gardens were laid out in 1698 and are 0.36 hectares (0.89 acres) in size. The garden is private and not open to the public, though it has taken part in the annual Open Garden Squares Weekend.

== Notable buildings ==
No. 23 was home to Heythrop College, University of London, the specialist Philosophy and Theology College of the University of London, until 2018. The College housed a library originally established in 1614 in Louvain (Leuven) by the Society of Jesus (the Jesuits) for those studies.

The Chapel of the Assumption Convent is located in Kensington Square. Built in 1875, the chapel became a listed building on 7 November 1984.

== Former residents ==
Blue plaque holders

The square includes the former homes of:

- composer Hubert Parry at No. 17
- liberal philosopher John Stuart Mill at No. 18
- sanitary reformer and pathologist John Simon at No. 40;
- Pre-Raphaelite artist Edward Burne-Jones at No. 41 —

Other homes belonged to, or were rented as their family home by:

- Lawyer and positivist Vernon Lushington at No. 36. He introduced one of the foremost Pre-Raphaelites, Edward Burne-Jones, to another, Dante Gabriel Rossetti, at the Working Men's College. The Lushingtons and Parrys frequently visited each other.
- Scholar and philanthropist Richard Buckley Litchfield (1832–1903) at No. 31 with his wife
- Henrietta Litchfield (1843–1927), who was Charles Darwin's daughter.
- Their niece, artist Gwen Raverat, describes visits there in her memoir Period Piece.

Between 1831 and 1896 (the) Kensington School occupied two sites: No. 31, then No.s 25–29. It is notable as one of the founders of the Football Association in 1863. The school built classrooms and fives courts in the gardens of the houses; all that remains is No. 27a, the cottage or small house behind No. 28.

== In popular culture ==
In the 2016 film The Exception, protagonist Mieke de Jong coyly inscribes a copy of landmark philosophical work Beyond Good and Evil with:

For my ignorant friend. 15 Kensington square, London W.

== See also ==
- Squares in London
- List of city squares
