= Kitto =

Kitto is a surname. Notable people with the surname include:

- Ernest Kitto (1871–1897), Scottish cricketer
- Francis Kitto (1897–1926), Welsh military aviator
- Frank Kitto (1903–1994), Australian high court justice
- H. D. F. Kitto (1897–1982), English classical Greek scholar
- John Kitto (1804–1854), English Bible scholar
- John Fenwick Kitto (1837–1903), English clergyman
- Ryan Kitto (born 1994), Australian professional footballer
- Stanislav Kitto (born 1972), Estonian professional footballer

== See also ==
- Kitto Line, Japanese railway line
