= Jones v Dunkel =

- Court: High Court of Australia
- Decided: 3 March 1959
- Citations: [1959] HCA 8, 101 CLR 298

Court membership
- Judges sitting: Dixon CJ, Taylor, Kitto, Menzies and Windeyer JJ

Case opinions
- majority A new trial should be ordered Kitto J, Menzies J, Windeyer J dissenting Dixon CJ, Taylor J

Jones v Dunkel is a decision of the High Court of Australia, concerning inferences that may be drawn when a party fails to give evidence.

The case is notable for having originated 'the rule in Jones v Dunkel'; an important rule in Australian civil procedure.

Jones v Dunkel is the tenth most cited decision of the High Court as of September 2020.

== Facts ==
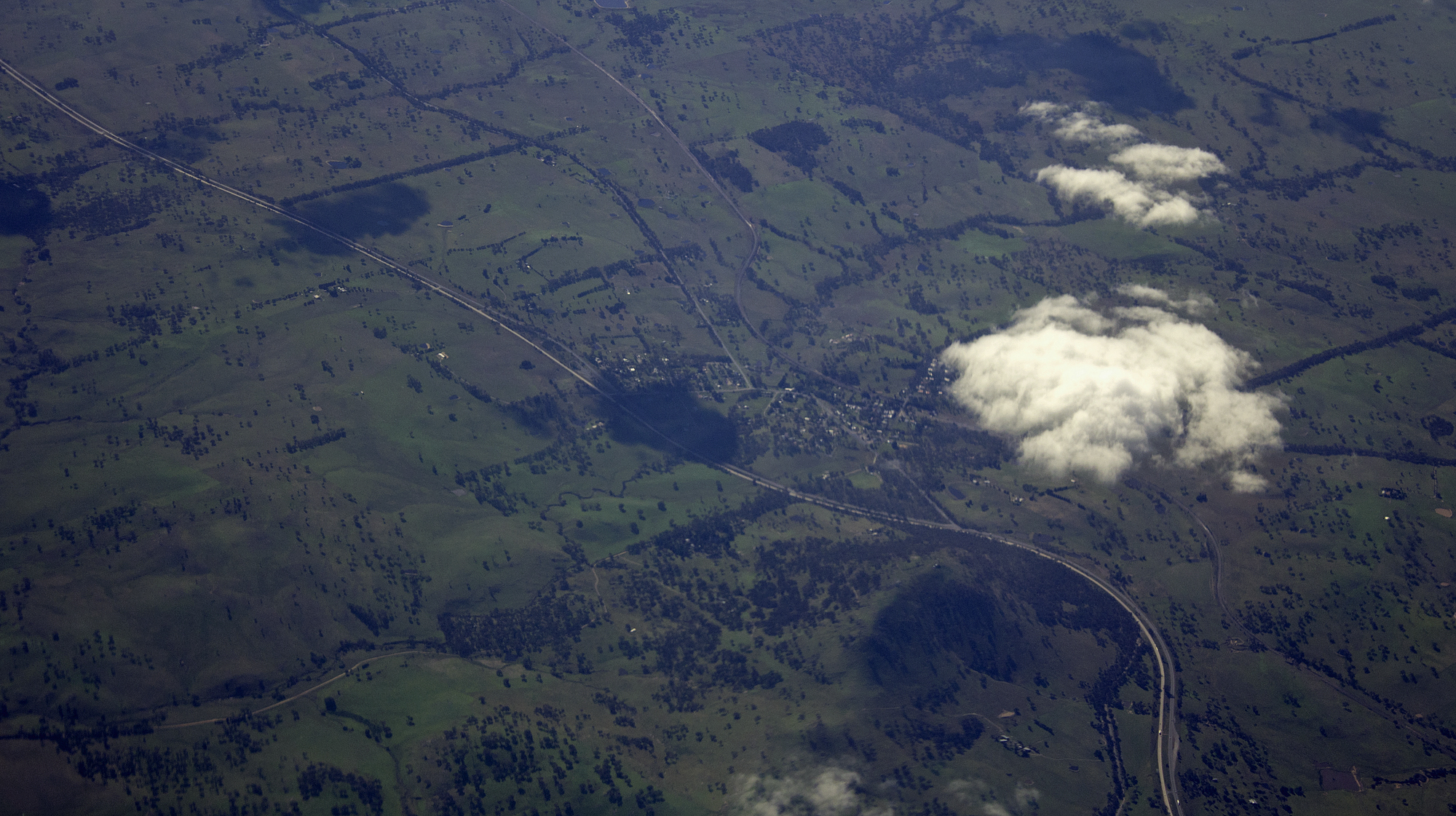
Pictured: The Hume Highway, the road where the crash took place

The husband of the plaintiff, Jones, had been killed in a traffic accident on the Hume Highway. His truck had been found crashed on the side of the road, with the front of his cabin crushed in on the off-side. Found nearby that wreck was another truck, which had been driven by Hegedus, an employee of the Defendant Dunkel. Hegedus was not killed but was hurt. Hegedus' truck was also badly damaged.

Hegedus had given a written statement to a police officer while in hospital, however he did not testify at trial. The defendant's counsel at the end of the plaintiff's case announced that he would not call evidence.

After the trial judge concluded summarizing the plaintiff's case, a member of the jury asked the judge whether they were allowed to regard Hegedus' decision to not give evidence, as a weakness in the defendant's case. Following this, submissions were made by the parties about appropriate directions. The ultimate direction given to the jurors was as follows:

'This is the position, the defendant having called no evidence it is a matter of common sense that you should accept the plaintiff's evidence with respect to the facts as being accurate. The fact that the defendant Hegedus has not gone into the box and offered any explanation leaves you in this position, that you can accept the facts given by the plaintiff as proved, but the question then is whether you should find negligence against him as a matter of inference to be drawn from those facts, and that is the question for you, whether you think from the proved facts an inference of negligence ought to be drawn. If you think so, the plaintiff is entitled to your verdict. If, on the other hand, you think no such inference can be drawn then the verdict must go against the plaintiff and in favour of the defendant'

The jury then found for the defendant that an action in negligence had not been established. An application for a new trial to the NSW Supreme Court failed. The plaintiff then appealed to the High Court.

== Judgment ==
A majority of the High Court found that the trial judge's jury directions were a misdirection. As Justice Kitto wrote:

'His Honour told the jury that the fact that Hegedus had not gone into the box left them in this position, that they could accept the facts given by the plaintiff as proved, and that the question for them then was whether they thought that from the proved facts an inference of negligence ought to be drawn. It was right enough to point out, in effect, that the evidence given might be the more readily accepted because it had been left uncontradicted, and that the omission to call Hegedus as a witness could not properly be treated as supplying any gap which the evidence adduced for the plaintiff left untouched.

But what should have been added, and not being added was in the circumstances as good as denied, was that any inference favourable to the plaintiff for which there was ground in the evidence might be more confidently drawn when a person presumably able to put the true complexion on the facts relied on as the ground for the inference has not been called as a witness by the defendant and the evidence provides no sufficient explanation of his absence.

The jury should at least have been told that it would be proper for them to conclude that if Hegedus had gone into the witness-box his evidence would not have assisted the defendants by throwing doubt on the correctness of the inference which, as I have explained, I consider was open on the plaintiff's evidence. In my opinion what his Honour said on the point amounted to a misdirection.'

For this reason a majority of the court ordered that there be a retrial.

== Significance ==
Jones v Dunkel is a very important case for Australian rules of civil procedure. Its role has led to it being the tenth most cited case in the High Court's history.

=== 'The rule in Jones v Dunkel' ===
The case gave rise to what is commonly termed 'the rule in Jones v Dunkel'. One (non-judicial) phrasing of the rule is as follows: ‘... the unexplained failure by a party to give evidence, to call witnesses or to tender documents or other evidence may (not must) lead to an inference that the uncalled evidence or missing material would not have assisted that party's case'.

Justice Glass described the rule as operating where a witness 'would be expected to be available to one party rather than the other', for whatever reason. For example, failing to request the testimony of a police officer would not give rise to the rule (due to assumptions of impartiality); however a party failing to call their doctor, employee, or close relative might give rise to an adverse inference. This rule is not strict; and may be displaced if there is an adequate explanation as to why the witness was not called.

Inferences that are drawn in accordance with the rule cannot be used to fill gaps in evidence, or 'connect conjecture into suspicion'.

Jones v Dunkel has application in criminal proceedings, but is very restricted in that context.
