= Christopher Benson =

Christopher Benson may refer to:

- Christopher Benson (theologian) (1788–1868), English preacher and lecturer
- Christopher Benson (businessman) (1933–2024), British chartered surveyor, company director and chair of public bodies
