= Myddelton Square =

Garden square in Islington, London, England

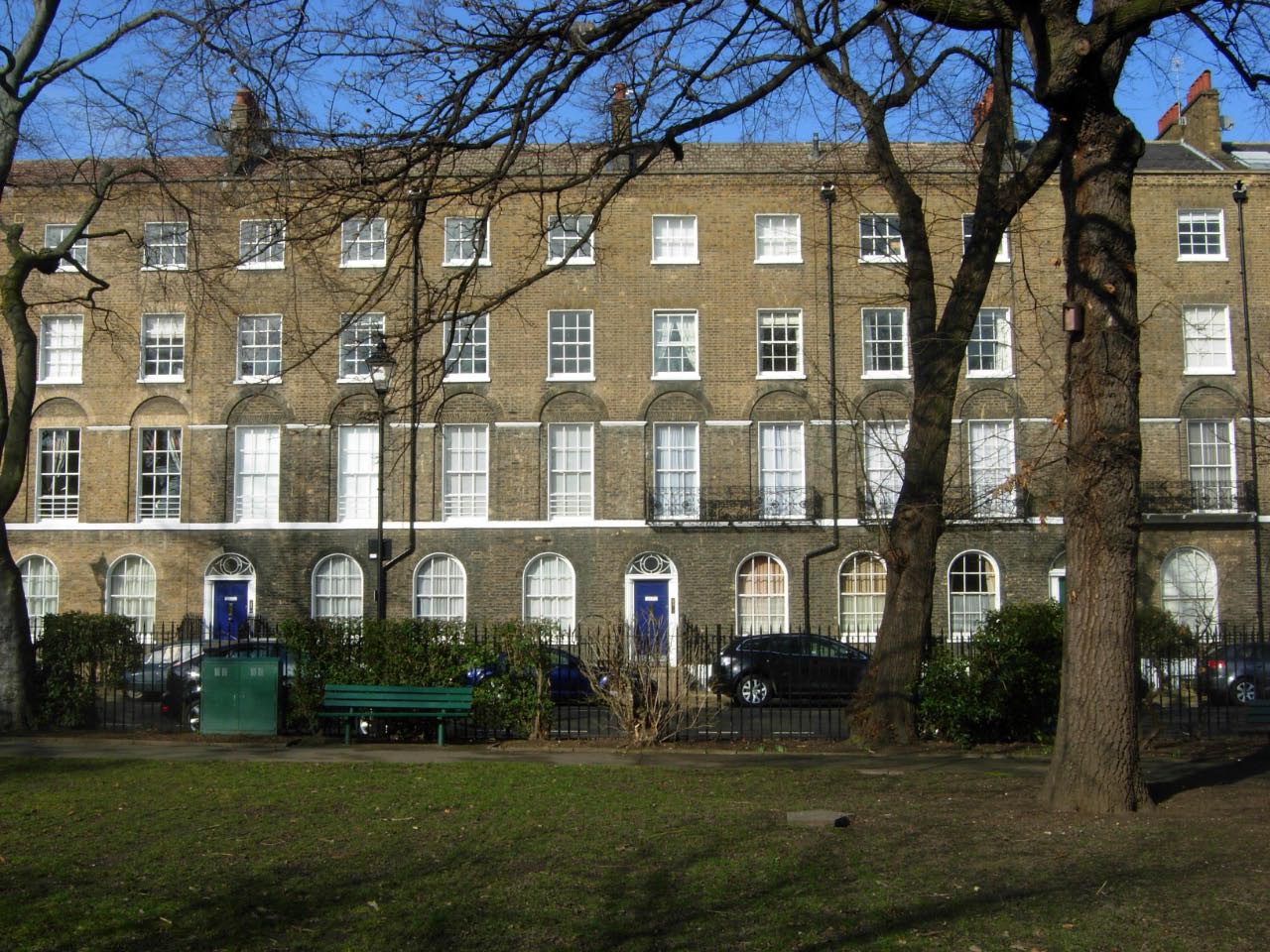
- Myddelton Square

- Location within London Borough of Islington
- Postal code: EC1
- Coordinates: 51.5301°N 0.1084°W

Construction
- Construction start: 1824
- Completion: 1836

Myddelton Square is the largest square in the Clerkenwell part of Islington, London. It is a residential public garden square, built in the 1820s and 1830s, with a playground and many trees. Its houses are built with exposed brickwork in Georgian style, with high-ceilinged ground and first-floor storeys. There is a large Gothic Revival church in the centre of the square. It is considered by some to be Islington's best and most important adornment of the New River Estate, and, stylistically, it is the most cohesive in the district.

== History ==
The New River Company was the owner of the large New River Estate at the top of the Islington Hill. Until 1904, the Company managed the New River, a man-made water channel which carried drinking water for 20 mi (32 km) to London from the Chadwell and Amwell Springs near Ware in Hertfordshire. It opened in 1613 and fed reservoirs in Islington.

By 1818, the Company had decided to develop the estate, including a residential square and a church. The site was a large field called "Butcher's Mantells", near to the Upper Pond reservoir where Claremont Square was built at the same time. The estate was laid out and developed by the Company's architect and surveyor, William Chadwell Mylne, who also designed St Mark's Church at the centre of Myddelton Square.

After initially referring to the development as "Chadwell Square", the square was finally named after Sir Hugh Myddelton (1560–1631), the founder of the New River Company. Construction commenced in 1824, but was not completed until 1836, with thirteen different builders. In 1829 the centre of the square was enclosed with railings and laid out with ornamental gardens for use by the inhabitants only, the church being separately railed.

One of the first residents was the actor and playwright Thomas John Dibdin, who wrote that the area "not five years since, was an immense field, where people used to be stopped and robbed on their return from Sadler's Wells; and the ground floor of the parlour where I sit was as nearly as possible the very spot where my wife and I fell over a recumbent cow, on our way home one murky night in a thunder storm, and only regained the solitary path ... by the timely aid of a tremendous flash of lightning."

As its most prestigious and "highly fashionable" development, the New River Company was initially careful to guard the square's respectability, as were the inhabitants: in 1832 residents complained that boys using the square as a playground were "dangerous and annoying". Early residents were mostly members of the professions, particularly medicine and the law, or else merchants. By 1841, there were already some skilled manufacturers living in the square, and lodging-house occupation gradually spread. By the later nineteenth century, the professional classes were giving way to clerks, white-collar workers, tradesmen and artisans. Charles Booth’s poverty map of c. 1890 shows Myddelton Square households as "Middle class. Well-to-do." By the end of the century the square was mainly given over to lodging houses, largely inhabited by young professional men. Multiple occupancy became widespread, and the square's houses began to be converted to flats, often by lateral conversion across adjacent houses.

Nos. 3 and 4 were demolished in 1938–1939 for the widening and re-routing of Myddelton Passage. Nos. 43–53 on the north side were destroyed by bombing on 11 January 1941 during the London Blitz. They were rebuilt by the New River Company in 1947 and 1948 as flats behind a facsimile façade, receiving government compensation for the reconstruction. The gardens, which had become derelict during the war, were re-landscaped and rerailed at the same time, with a playground north of the church and a new paved layout to the east in what had become public gardens.

By the early 1980s, there were relatively few undivided houses left. However, following Right to Buy legislation the London Borough of Islington began to sell properties it owned in the square in the 1980s, and a few divided houses were taken back into single or double occupation. The square has now been partially re-gentrified.

== Description ==
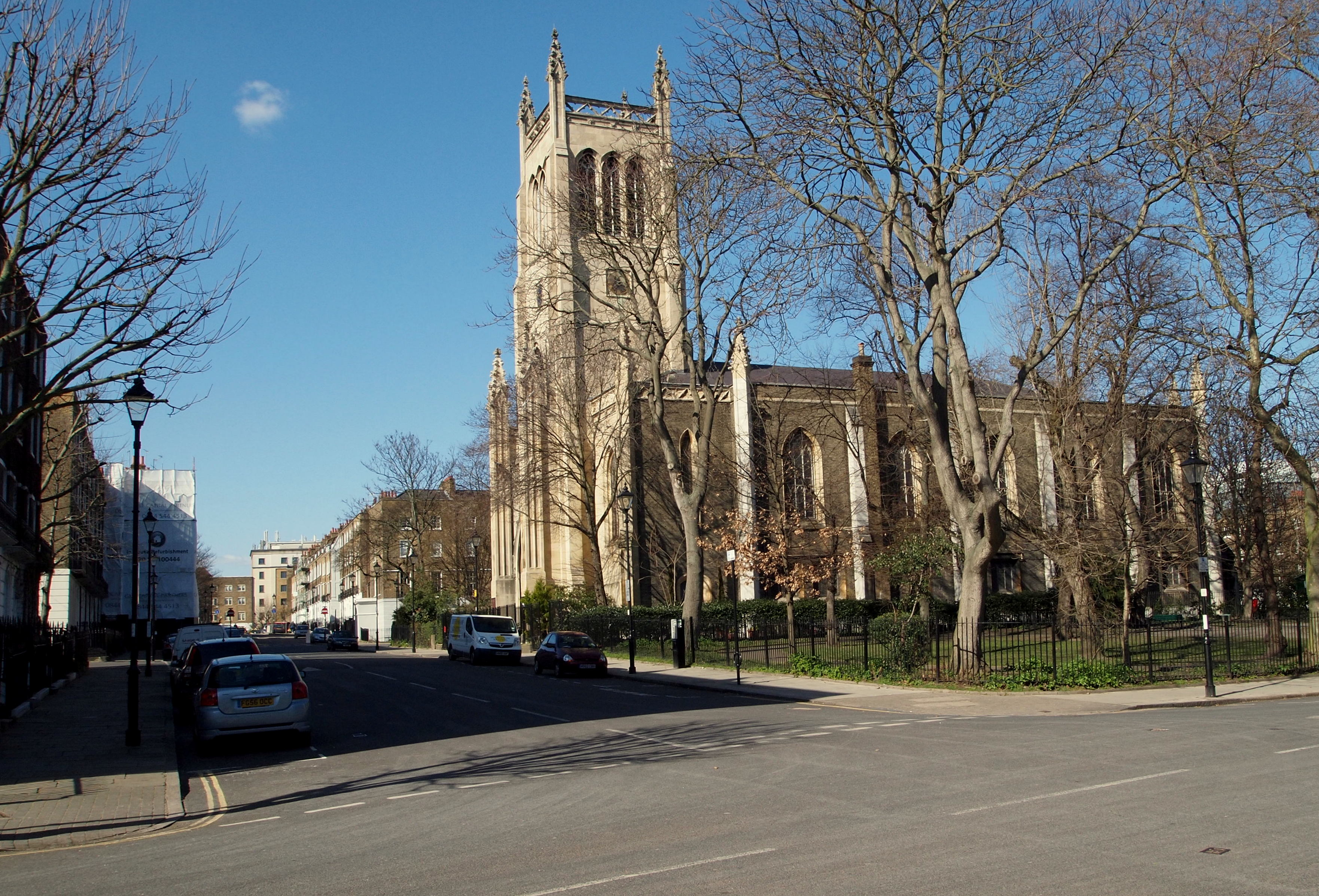
St Mark's Church

=== Layout ===
There are three main approach roads, the broadest being from the east. In addition, there is access via Myddleton Passage, the creation of which necessitated the removal of nos. 3 and 4, thus giving access to two apartment blocks and their landscaped grounds. An earlier access on the same side was filled in to become new houses in the same style, nos. 11A and 12A.

Internally, including roads and pavements, the square contains 3.84 acres (1.55 ha), and measures 414 feet (126 m) by 370 feet (110 m) from one set of houses' fronting to another.

=== Architecture ===
The square presents as a set of 73 large townhouses in its original style but many have been internally subdivided. All are constructed in a Georgian style of yellow stock brick, often now slightly darkened, in Flemish bond with a white banded stucco (to resemble stone-built) ground floor. The facsimile façaded frontages of nos. 43–53 differ by having full-height brickwork and no ground floor stone-like dressings, like the others. All of the houses are Grade II listed, as is the church.

=== St Mark's Church ===
The square surrounds St Mark's Church, which fronts the street on the west side of its garden.

St Mark's was designed by William Chadwell Mylne in neo-Gothic style, and built 1825–1827 at a cost of about £18,000 as a chapel of ease for Clerkenwell. It has a 90 ft (27 m) west tower.

During the Second World War, the church was badly damaged. The original internal three-sided gallery was removed, leaving the interior somewhat bare, The original east window was replaced by one showing the Ascension, incorporating scenes of historic local events.

== Notable residents ==
- Thomas John Dibdin (1771–1841), dramatist, actor and theatre manager, was one of the first residents in the square, at no. 5 or no. 7 in 1826–1827.
- Sir George Buchanan (1831–1895), epidemiologist, was born in the square in 1831.
- Edward Hughes ((1832–1908), portrait artist, was born in Myddelton Square.
- Stanley Lees Giffard 1788–1858), barrister, writer, journalist, Biblical scholar, book-collector and critic, and founder and first editor of London newspaper The Standard, lived at either no. 9 or no. 39.
- Jabez Bunting (1779–1858), Wesleyan Methodist leader and the most prominent Methodist after John Wesley's death in 1791, lived and died at no. 30. In 1986 a green plaque was placed on his former home.
- John Hannah the elder (1792–1867), Wesleyan Methodist minister, lived at no. 8 in the early 1840s.
- Elijah Hoole (1798–1872), Wesleyan Methodist missionary, lived at no. 8 from the 1840s until 1872.
- Golding Bird (1814–1854), physician and pioneer of electrical treatment, lived at no. 19 in the 1840s.
- Joseph Frederick Green (1855–1932), politician and peace campaigner, was born at no. 12A.
- Guido Philipp Schmitt (1834–1922), portrait painter, lived at no. 9 in 1869.
- Annie Abram (1869–1930), medieval social historian, was born at no. 45.
- Edward Ballard (1820–1897), physician and pioneer of health and sanitary reform, lived at no. 42.
- Richard Garnett, (1835–1906), Keeper of Printed Books at the British Museum, lived in the square.
- Fenner Brockway (1888–1988), political activist, writer, and a founder of the Campaign for Nuclear Disarmament, lived from 1908-1910 at no. 60, which became the base for the Independent Labour Party. A commemorative plaque marks his residency.
- B. S. Johnson (1933–1973), novelist, poet and literary critic, lived from 1965 to 1969 in a flat at no. 5.

== In popular culture ==
The square was used as the prime location for a key scene in the 2015 film Suffragette.

A BBC adaptation of Howards End, by EM Forster, in 2017, used a house as the London home of the central Schlegel family (suggestive of fictional "Wickham Place").
