= Rehearsal Club =

Rehearsal Club may refer to:

- Rehearsal Club (London), a London organization founded in 1892 to support actresses during the day in London
- Rehearsal Club (New York), a New York women's residence, founded in 1913 as a safe haven for aspiring young women pursuing a career in the arts
