= Hulsean Lectures =

University of Cambridge lecture series

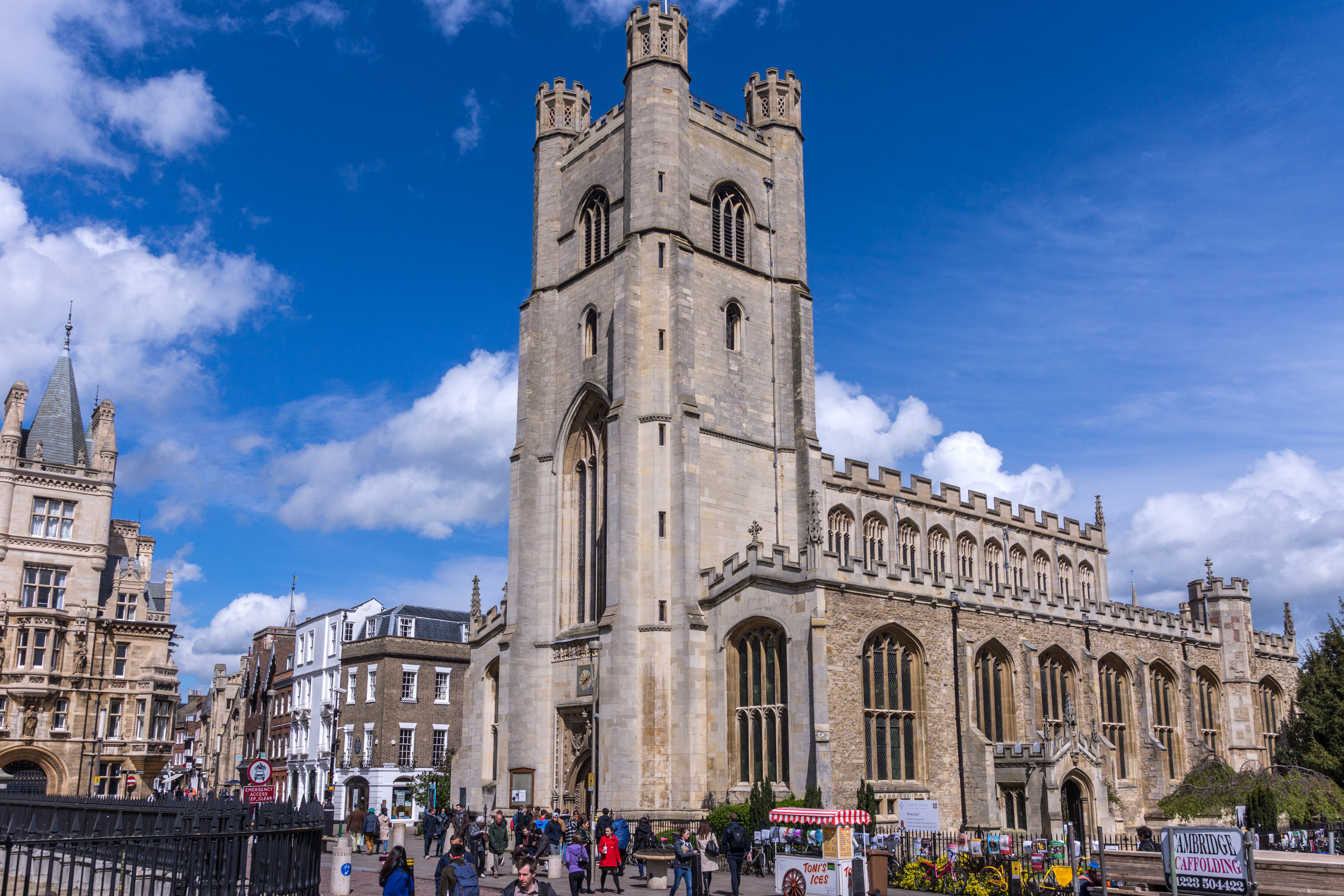
Church of St Mary the Great where the Hulsean Lectures were originally held

The Hulsean Lectures were established from an endowment made by John Hulse to the University of Cambridge in 1790. At present, they consist of a series of four to eight lectures given by a university graduate on some branch of Christian theology.

== History ==
The lectures were originally to be given by a "learned and ingenious clergyman" from Cambridge, holding the degree of Master of Arts, who was under the age of forty years. The terms for the lectures were quite extensive and particular. The lecturer was

to preach twenty sermons in the whole year, that is to say, ten sermons in the following spring in Saint Mary's Great Church in Cambridge, namely, one sermon either on the Friday morning or else on Sunday afternoon in every week during the months of April and May and the two first weeks of June, and likewise ten sermons in the same church in the following Autumn, either on the Friday morning or else on Sunday afternoon in every week during the months of September and October and during the two first weeks in November ... The subject of five sermons in the Spring and likewise of five sermons in the Autumn shall be to show the evidence for Revealed Religion, and to demonstrate in the most convincing and persuasive manner the Truth and Excellence of Christianity, so as to include not only the prophecies and miracles, general and particular, but also any other proper and useful arguments, whether the same be direct or collateral proofs of the Christian religion, which he may think fittest to discourse upon, either in general or particular, especially the collateral arguments, or else any particular article or branch thereof, and chiefly against notorious infidels, whether atheists or deists, not descending to any particular sects or controversies (so much to be lamented) amongst Christians themselves, except some new or dangerous error either of superstition or enthusiasm, as of Popery or Methodism or the like ... [The lecturer] may at his own discretion preach either more or fewer than ten sermons on this great argument only, provided he shall in consequence thereof lessen or increase the number of the other ten remaining sermons which are hereinafter directed to be on the more obscure parts of Holy Scripture in a due proportion, so as that he shall every year preach twenty sermons on these subjects in the whole. And as to the ten sermons that remain, of which five are to be preached in the Spring and five in the Autumn as before mentioned, the lecturer or preacher shall take for his subject some of the more difficult texts or obscure parts of the Holy Scriptures, such I mean as may appear to be more generally useful or necessary to be explained, and which may best admit of such a comment or explanation without presuming to pry too far into the profound secrets or awful mysteries of the Almighty. And in all the said twenty sermons such practical observations shall be made and such useful conclusions added as may best instruct and edify mankind, the said twenty sermons to be every year printed and a new preacher to be every elected (except in the case of the extraordinary merit of the preacher) when it may sometimes be thought proper to continue the same person for five, at the most for six years together, but no longer term, nor shall he ever afterwards be again elected to the same duty.

As a result of these rather demanding terms and conditions, for some thirty years (1790–1819) no person could be found who would undertake the office of this lectureship. The first to accept was Christopher Benson, who held the post until 1822, at which time he quit, having found the terms and conditions imposed by the lectureship too fatiguing and laborious. For the rest of the decade, only two more lecturers were found, and both in their turn resigned for the same reasons. Finally, in 1830, after the post had remained vacant for three years, the Court of Chancery reduced the number of lectures to be given in a year to eight and extended the deadline for publishing the lectures to one year following the delivery of the last lecture. In 1860 the number of lectures was further reduced to a minimum of four. Also changed at this time was the length of appointment to one year, with the possibility of reappointment after an interval of five years; the lecturer need not be a clergyman, but simply have some higher degree from Cambridge and be at least thirty years of age; and the necessity of printing or publishing the lectures was done away with. The topic was somewhat simplified to something that would show the evidence for Revealed Religion, or to explain some of the most difficult texts or obscure parts of Holy Scripture. Finally, by 1952 the topic was changed to its present wording, "on some branch of Christian Theology", and the office of the lectureship was extended to two years.

The following list of lectures has been compiled from a number of different sources.

== Lecturers ==
=== 1820–1850 ===
- 1820 – Christopher Benson, Hulsean lectures for 1820: Twenty discourses preached before the University of Cambridge in the year 1820, at the lecture founded by the Rev. John Hulse
- 1821 – James Clarke Franks, On the evidences of Christianity, as they were stated and enforced in the discourses of our Lord: comprising a connected view of the claims which Jesus advanced, of the arguments by which he supported them, and of his statements respecting the causes, progress, and consequences of infidelity
- 1822 – Christopher Benson, On Scripture Difficulties
- 1823 – James Clarke Franks, On the apostolical preaching and vindication of the gospel to the Jews, Samaritans, and devout Gentiles: as exhibited in the Acts of the Apostles, the Epistles of St. Peter, and the Epistle to the Hebrews
- 1824 – No appointment
- 1825 – No appointment
- 1826 – Temple Chevallier, On the historical types contained in the Old Testament
- 1827 – Temple Chevallier, On the proofs of divine power and wisdom: derived from the study of astronomy; and on the evidence, doctrines, and precepts of revealed religion
- 1828 – No appointment
- 1829 – No appointment
- 1830 – No appointment
- 1831 – John James Blunt, The veracity of the historical books of the Old Testament: from the conclusion of the Pentateuch, to the opening of the prophets, argued from the undesigned coincidences to be found in them, when compared in their several parts: being a continuation of the argument for the veracity of the five books of Moses
- 1832 – John James Blunt, Principles for the proper understanding of the Mosaic writings stated and applied: together with an incidental argument for the truth of the resurrection of our Lord
- 1833 – Henry John Rose, The Law of Moses viewed in connexion with the History and Character of the Jews: with a defence of the book of Joshua against professor Leo of Berlin
- 1834 – No appointment
- 1835 – Henry Howarth, The truth and obligation of revealed religion, considered with reference to prevailing opinions
- 1836 – Henry Howarth, Jesus of Nazareth, the Christ of God
- 1837 – Richard Parkinson, Rationalism and Revelation: or, The testimony of moral philosophy, the system of nature, and the constitution of man, to the truth of the doctrines of Scripture
- 1838 – Richard Parkinson, The constitution of the visible church of Christ : considered, under the heads of authority and inspiration of scripture; creeds, tradition; articles of religion; heresy and schism; state-alliance, preaching, and national education
- 1839 – Theyre Townsend Smith, Man's responsibility in reference to his religious belief
- 1840 – Theyre Townsend Smith, The Christian religion in connexion with the principles of morality
- 1841 – Henry Alford, The consistency of the Divine conduct in revealing of the doctrines of redemption
- 1842 – Henry Alford, The consistency of the Divine conduct in revealing of the doctrines of redemption: part the second
- 1843 – John Howard Marsden, An examination of certain passages in our Lord's conversation with Nicodemus
- 1844 – John Howard Marsden, The evils which have resulted at various times from a misapprehension of our Lord's miracles
- 1845 – Richard Chenevix Trench, The fitness of Holy Scripture for unfolding the spiritual life of men
- 1846 – Richard Chenevix Trench, Christ the Desire of all Nations: or, The unconscious prophecies of heathendom
- 1847 – Christopher Wordsworth, On the Canon of the Scriptures of the Old and New Testament, and on the Apocrypha
- 1848 – Christopher Wordsworth, Lectures on the Apocalypse: critical, expository, and practical
- 1849 – William Gilson Humphry, The Doctrine of a Future State
- 1850 – William Gilson Humphry, The Early Progress of the Gospel

=== 1851–1875 ===
- 1851 – George Currey, The preparation of the gospel as exhibited in the history of the Israelites
- 1852 – George Currey, The confirmation of faith by reason and authority
- 1853 – Benjamin Morgan Cowie, Scripture difficulties: four sermons preached before the University of Cambridge, in April, 1853, at the lecture founded by the Rev. John Hulse
- 1854 – Benjamin Morgan Cowie, Scripture difficulties: sermons preached before the University of Cambridge, including the Hulsean lectures for 1854
- 1855 – Harvey Goodwin, The Doctrines and Difficulties of the Christian Faith contemplated from the standing ground afforded by the Catholic doctrine of the being of our Lord Jesus Christ
- 1856 – Harvey Goodwin, The Glory of the Only Begotten of the Father seen in the manhood of Christ
- 1857 – Charles Anthony Swainson, The Creeds of the Church, in their relations to the word of God and to the conscience of the Christian
- 1858 – Charles Anthony Swainson, The Authority of the New Testament, the Conviction of Righteousness, and the Ministry of Reconciliation
- 1859 – Charles John Ellicott, Historical Lectures on the Life of Our Lord Jesus Christ
- 1860 – John Lamb, The Seven Words spoken against the Lord Jesus: or an investigation of the motives which led his contemporaries to reject him
- 1861 – Charles Merivale, not published
- 1862 – John Saul Howson, The Character of St. Paul
- 1863 – Francis Morse, not published
- 1864 – Daniel Moore, The Age and the Gospel
- 1865 – James Moorhouse, Our Lord Jesus Christ the Subject of Growth in Wisdom
- 1866 – Edward Henry Perowne, The Godhead of Jesus
- 1867 – Charles Pritchard, Analogies in the Progress of Nature and Grace
- 1868 – John James Stewart Perowne, Immortality
- 1869 – John Venn, On Some of the Characteristics of Belief: Scientific and Religious
- 1870 – Frederic William Farrar, The Witness of History to Christ
- 1871 – Fenton John Anthony Hort, The Way The Truth The Life
- 1872 – Josiah Brown Pearson, not published
- 1873 – Stanley Leathes, The Gospel its own Witness
- 1874 – George Martin Straffen, Sin, as set forth in Holy Scripture
- 1875 – Edward Thomas Vaughan Some Reasons of our Christian Hope

=== 1876–1900 ===
- 1876 – Edwin Abbott Abbott, Through Nature to Christ: or, The Ascent of Worship Through Illusion to the Truth
- 1877 – George Smith Drew, The Human Life of Christ: Revealing the Order of the Universe
- 1878 – William Boyd Carpenter, The Witness of the Heart to Christ
- 1879 – Vincent Henry Stanton, The Jewish and the Christian Messiah: a study in the earliest history of Christianity
- 1880 – Thomas Thomason Perowne, "The Intercession of Christ, or our Lord's present work in Heaven as High Priest of His Church, as it is revealed in Holy Scripture, and in its bearing on the worship of the Church on earth" (not published)
- 1881 – Joseph Foxley, Secularism, Scepticism, Ritualism, Liberationism
- 1882 – Frederick Watson, The Law and the Prophets
- 1883 – John James Lias, The Atonement Viewed in the Light of Certain Modern Difficulties
- 1884 – Thomas George Bonney, The Influence of Science on Theology
- 1885 – William Cunningham, S. Austin and his Place in the History of Christian Thought
- 1886 – John de Soyres, Christian Reunion
- 1887 – Joseph Hirst Lupton, "Misrepresentations of Christianity," not published
- 1888 – Henry Major Stephenson, Christ the Life of Men
- 1889 – Edward George King, The "Asaph" Psalms in their Connexion with the Early Religion of Babylonia
- 1890 – John Llewelyn Davies, Order and Growth: as involved in the spiritual constitution of human society
- 1891 – Arthur Temple Lyttelton, The Place of Miracles in Religion
- 1892 – John Bickford Heard, Alexandrian and Carthaginian Theology Contrasted
- 1893 – Mandell Creighton, Persecution and Tolerance
- 1894 – Alfred Barry, The Ecclesiastical Expansion of England in the growth of the Anglican Communion
- 1895 – William Moore Ede, The Attitude of the Church to some of the Social Problems of Town Life
- 1896 – Samuel Cheetham, The Mysteries, Pagan and Christian
- 1897 – James Edward Cowell Welldon, The Hope of Immortality
- 1898 – James Wilson, The Gospel of the Atonement
- 1899 – Arthur James Mason, Purgatory; The State of the Faithful Departed; Invocation of Saints
- 1900 – Fredrick Henry Chase The Credibility of the Book of the Acts of the Apostles

=== 1901–1925 ===
- 1901 – Frederick Robert Tennant, The Origin and Propagation of sin
- 1902 – F. J. Foakes Jackson, Christian Difficulties in the Second and Twentieth Centuries: A Study of Marcion and his Relation to Modern Thought
- 1903 – William Allen Whitworth, Christian thought on present-day questions
- 1904 – Charles William Stubbs, The Christ of English Poetry
- 1905 – Henry Joseph Corbett Knight, The Temptation of Our Lord: Considered as related to the ministry and as a revelation of his person
- 1906 – James Pounder Whitney, The Episcopate and the Reformation: Our Outlook
- 1907 – John Howard Bertram Masterman, The Rights and Responsibilities of National Churches
- 1908 – John Neville Figgis, The Gospel and Human Needs
- 1909 – W. Edward Chadwick, Social Relationships in the Light of Christianity
- 1910 – Ernest Arthur Edghill, The Revelation of the Son of God: Some questions and considerations arising out of a study of second century Christianity ISBN 1-4365-0693-X
- 1911 – Reginald James Fletcher, Dei Christus, Dei verbum
- 1912 – H. Latimer Jackson, The Eschatology of Jesus
- 1913 – William Leighton Grane, Church Divisions and Christianity
- 1914 – Hugh Fraser Stewart, The Holiness of Pascal
- 1915 – Herbert A. Watson, The Mysticism of S. John's Gospel
- 1916 – Arthur Stuart Duncan Jones, Ordered Liberty: or, An Englishman's belief in his church
- 1917 – John Owen Farquhar Murray, The Goodness and Severity of God
- 1918 – Francis Ernest Hutchinson, Christian Freedom
- 1919 – Alexander Nairne, The Faith of the New Testament.
- 1920 – Philip Napier Waggett, Knowledge and Virtue
- 1921 – Leonard Elliott Elliot-Binns, Erasmus the Reformer: A Study in Restatement
- 1922 – Charles Frank Russell, Religion and Natural Law.
- 1923 – Stewart Andrew McDowall, Evolution, Knowledge and Revelation ISBN 978-1-107-60494-0
- 1924 – Alan Coates Bouquet, The Christian religion and its competitors to-day.
- 1925 – William Ralph Inge The Platonic Tradition in English Religious Thought ISBN 0-7661-5761-X

=== 1926–1945 ===
- 1926 – Charles E. Raven, The Creator Spirit: A Survey of Christian Doctrine in the Light of Biology, Psychology and Mysticism ISBN 0-7661-5044-5
- 1927 – Edmund Gough de Salis Wood, not published
- 1929 – Charles Archibald Anderson Scott, New Testament Ethics: An Introduction ISBN 978-1-107-45098-1
- 1931 – Allan John Smith Macdonald, Authority And Reason In The Early Middle Ages
- 1933 – Herbert George Wood, Christianity and the nature of history.
- 1936 – John Martin Creed, The Divinity of Jesus Christ: A Study in the History of Christian Doctrine since Kant ISBN 978-1-107-63606-4
- 1938 – John Burnaby, Amor dei: A Study of the Religion of St. Augustine ISBN 978-1-55635-501-1
- 1939 – Stephen Charles Neill, "The Forgiveness of Sins" (not published)
- 1941 – Election suspended
- 1942 – Election suspended
- 1943 – Election suspended
- 1944 – Election suspended
- 1945 – Election suspended

=== 1946–1975 ===
- 1947 – Edward Chisholm Dewick, The Christian Attitude to Other Religions.
- 1949 – William Owen Chadwick, "The Early Medieval Doctrine of the Church" (not published)
- 1950 – Robert Henry Thouless, Authority and Freedom: Some Psychological Problems of Religious Belief
- 1952 – Laurence Edward Browne, The Quickening Word: A Theological Answer to the Challenge of Islam
- 1954 – Henry Chadwick, "Origen"
- 1956 – Hendrik Kraemer, A Theology of the Laity ISBN 1-57383-031-3
- 1958 – Clifford William Dugmore, "The Doctrine of Grace in the English Reformers" (not published)
- 1960 – Peter Runham Ackroyd, Exile and Restoration: a study of Hebrew thought of the sixth century BC ISBN 0-334-00409-8
- 1964 – George Frederick Woods, A Defence of Theological Ethics ISBN 0-521-06859-2
- 1966 – Peter Richard Baelz, Prayer and Providence ISBN 0-334-01284-8
- 1967 – David Lawrence Edwards, Religion and Change ISBN 0-19-826673-1
- 1968 – John Arthur Thomas Robinson, The Human Face of God ISBN 1-85931-016-8
- 1970 – Kathleen Louise Wood-Legh, "Good Works" (not published)
- 1973 – Maurice Frank Wiles, The Remaking of Christian Doctrine ISBN 0-664-24217-0

=== 1976–2000 ===
- 1975–1976 – Peter Bingham Hinchliff, "The Relationship between Mission and Empire in the Nineteenth Century"
- 1977–1978 – Charles Davis, Theology and Political Society ISBN 0-521-22538-8
- 1979–1980 – Alan Malcolm George Stephenson, The Rise and Decline of English Modernism ISBN 0-281-04124-5
- 1981–1982 – Gordon McGregor Kendal, "The Problem of Pleasure: A Christian Analysis" (not published)
- 1983–1984 – David Michael Thompson, Baptism, Church and Society in Modern Britain: From the Evangelical Revival to Baptism, Eucharist and Ministry ISBN 1-84227-393-0
- 1985–1986 – David Nicholls, Deity and Domination: Images of God and the State in the 19th and 20th Centuries ISBN 0-415-01171-X and God and Government in an 'Age of Reason' ISBN 0-415-01173-6
- 1987–1988 – Ingolf Ulrich Dalferth, "A Grammar of Faith" (not published)
- 1989–1990 – John Barton, The Spirit and the Letter: Studies in the Biblical Canon. ISBN 0-281-05011-2
- 1991–1992 – Sarah Coakley, God, Sexuality, and the Self: An Essay 'On the Trinity'. ISBN 978-0-521-55826-6
- 1993–1994 – Oliver O'Donovan, The Desire of the Nations ISBN 0-521-66516-7
- 1994–1995 – David Brown (theologian)
- 1995–1996 – Nicholas Sagovsky, Ecumenism, Christian Origins and the Practice of Communion. ISBN 0-521-77269-9
- 1997–1998 – Brian Murdoch, Adam's Grace: Fall and Redemption in Medieval Literature. ISBN 0-85991-559-X
- 1999–2000 – Philip Sheldrake, Spaces for the Sacred: Place, Memory, Identity. ISBN 0-334-02820-5 ISBN 0801868610

=== 2001– ===
- 2001–2002 – John de Gruchy, Reconciliation: Restoring Justice. ISBN 978-0-8006-3600-5
- 2003–2004 – N. T. Wright, Paul: Fresh Perspectives ISBN 0-8006-6357-8
- 2005–2006 – Ellen F. Davis, Scripture, Culture, and Agriculture: An Agrarian Reading of the Bible. ISBN 0-521-51834-2
- 2007–2008 – Hugh McLeod, "Religion and the Rise of Sport in Modern England" (not published)
- 2009–2010 – Alister E. McGrath, Darwinism and the Divine: Evolutionary Thought and Natural Theology ISBN 978-1-4443-3343-5
- 2011–2012 – Neil MacGregor, "The Cost of the Beauty of Holiness: The spiritual price of the visual tradition in the western church" (not published)
- 2013–2014 – Richard B. Hays, Reading Backwards: Figural Christology and the Fourfold Gospel Witness. ISBN 978-1481302326
- 2015–2016 – Rowan Williams, "Christ and the Logic of Creation"
- 2017–2018 – Marilynne Robinson, "Holy Moses: An appreciation of Genesis and Exodus as Literature and Theology."
- 2019–2020 – Walter Moberly, "The God of Christian Scripture"
- 2021–2022 – Judith Wolfe, “The Theological Imagination"

== See also ==
- Bampton Lectures
- Norris–Hulse Professor of Divinity – another position supported by the bequest of John Hulse.
