= Foakes =

Foakes is an English surname. Notable people with the surname include:

- Ben Foakes (born 1993), English cricketer
- F. J. Foakes-Jackson (1855–1941), Church historian
- Peter Foakes (1946–2006), English football referee
- R. A. Foakes (1923–2013), English author and Shakespeare scholar
