= William Cunningham (economist) =

British economist and priest (1849–1919)

The Reverend William Cunningham FBA
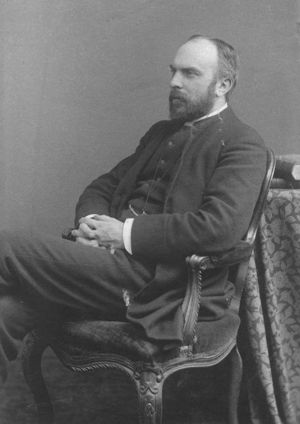
- Born: 29 December 1849; Edinburgh, Scotland
- Died: 10 June 1919 (aged 69); Cambridge, England
- Known for: Establishment of economic history in Britain
- Spouse: Adèle Rebecca Dunlop (m. 1876)

Ecclesiastical career
- Religion: Christianity (Anglican)
- Church: Church of England
- Ordained: 1873 (deacon); 1874 (priest)
- Offices held: Archdeacon of Ely (1907–1919)

Academic background
- Education: University of Edinburgh; Trinity College, Cambridge
- Thesis: The Influence of Descartes on Metaphysical Speculation in England (1876)
- Influences: F. D. Maurice

Academic work
- Discipline: Economics; history
- Sub-discipline: Economic history
- School or tradition: English historical school of economics
- Institutions: Trinity College, Cambridge; King's College, London
- Notable students: Ellen McArthur
- Notable works: The Growth of English Industry and Commerce (1882)
- Influenced: Annie Abram; Lilian Knowles

William Cunningham FBA (29 December 1849 – 10 June 1919) was a Scottish economic historian and Anglican priest. He was a proponent of the historical method in economics and an opponent of free trade.

== Early life and education ==
Cunningham was born in Edinburgh, Scotland, the third son of James Cunningham, Writer to the Signet. Educated at the Edinburgh Institution (taught by Robert McNair Ferguson, amongst others), the Edinburgh Academy, the University of Edinburgh, and Trinity College, Cambridge, he graduated BA in 1873, having gained first-class honours in the Moral Science tripos.

== Career ==
Cunningham took holy orders in 1873, later serving as chaplain of Trinity College, Cambridge, from 1880 to 1891. He was university lecturer in history from 1884 to 1891, in which year he was appointed Tooke Professor of Economy and Statistics at King's College, London, a post which he held until 1897. He was lecturer in economic history at Harvard University (c. 1899), and Hulsean Lecturer at Cambridge (1885). He became vicar of Great St Mary's, Cambridge, in 1887, and was a founding fellow of the British Academy. In 1907 he was appointed Archdeacon of Ely.

Cunningham's Growth of English Industry and Commerce During the Early and Middle Ages (1890; 4th ed., 1905) and Growth of English Industry and Commerce in Modern Times (1882; 3rd ed., 1903) were at the time among the standard works of reference on the industrial history of England.

Cunningham's eminence as an economic historian gave special importance to his support of Joseph Chamberlain from 1903 onwards in criticizing the English free-trade policies and advocating tariff reform.

He was a critic of the nascent neoclassical economics, particularly as propounded by his colleague, Alfred Marshall, and the Cambridge school.

Cunningham has been described as "a champion of women's education in Cambridge." He taught the British historian Annie Abram.

Cunningham died in 1919 in Cambridge, England.

== Works ==
- Growth of English Industry and Commerce in Modern Times: The Mercantile System (1882); Cambridge U. Press, revised 7th ed. (1907) on line, McMaster
- Politics and Economics: An Essay on the Nature of the Principles of Political Economy, Together with a Survey of Recent Legislation, London, Kegan, Paul, Trench & Co. (1885)
- Growth of English Industry and Commerce During the Early and Middle Ages (1890); Cambridge, 5th ed. (1910) on line, McMaster
- The Use and Abuse of Money, New York, Scribner's (1891); Kessinger, (2006) ISBN 1-4254-9423-4
- William Cunningham (1897). Alien Immigrants to England. The Macmillan Co. "alien immigrants to england."; Routledge (1997) ISBN 0-7146-1295-2
- An Essay on Western Civilization in Its Economic Aspects (Ancient Times), Cambridge U. Press (1898)
- An Essay on Western Civilization in Its Economic Aspects (Mediaeval and Modern Times), Cambridge U. Press (1900)
- The Rise and Decline of the Free Trade Movement (1904); Cosimo ISBN 1-60520-115-4
- Christianity and Politics, Boston and New York, Houghton Mifflin (1915)
- The Story of Cambridgeshire (1920). Cambridge University Press (reissued by Cambridge University Press, 2009; ISBN 978-1-108-00341-4)

== See also ==
- Compatriots Club
- National Party (UK, 1917)

Church of England titles
Preceded by William Emery	Archdeacon of Ely; 1907–1919	Succeeded by Horace Price
Academic offices
Preceded by Thomas George Bonney	Hulsean Lecturer; 1885	Succeeded by John de Soyres
Professional and academic associations
Preceded by William Hunt	President of the Royal Historical Society; 1909–1913	Succeeded by Charles Firth
