= Ernest Arthur Edghill =

British Anglican priest and theological writer

Ernest Arthur Edghill (3 February 1879, Gibraltar – 23 August 1912), B.D., was an Anglican priest and theological writer. He was the Hulsean Lecturer at Cambridge 1910–11, and Lecturer in Ecclesiastical History at King's College London.

Ernest Arthur Edghill was educated at Eton and King's College, Cambridge, where he studied theology.

== Works ==
- Evidential value of Prophecy
- Amos
- Faith and Fact
- The Spirit of Power
- The Revelation of the Son of God
