= Robert McNair Ferguson =

Scottish mathematician

Robert McNair Ferguson FRSE FRSSA
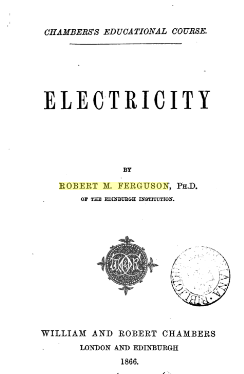
- Front page of Electricity (1866)
- Born: 8 July 1829; Airdrie, North Lanarkshire, Scotland
- Died: 31 December 1912 (aged 83); Edinburgh, Scotland
- Resting place: Cemetery of The Grange, Edinburgh; 55.934944°N 3.190369°W
- Education: University of Edinburgh; University of Heidelberg
- Known for: Founder of the Edinburgh Mathematical Society
- Scientific career
- Fields: Mathematics
- Workplaces: Edinburgh Institute
- Thesis: (1855)
- Doctoral advisor: Robert Bunsen
- Notable students: William Cunningham

Robert McNair Ferguson FRSE FRSSA (1829–1912) was a Scottish mathematician and a founder of the Edinburgh Mathematical Society.

== Life and work ==
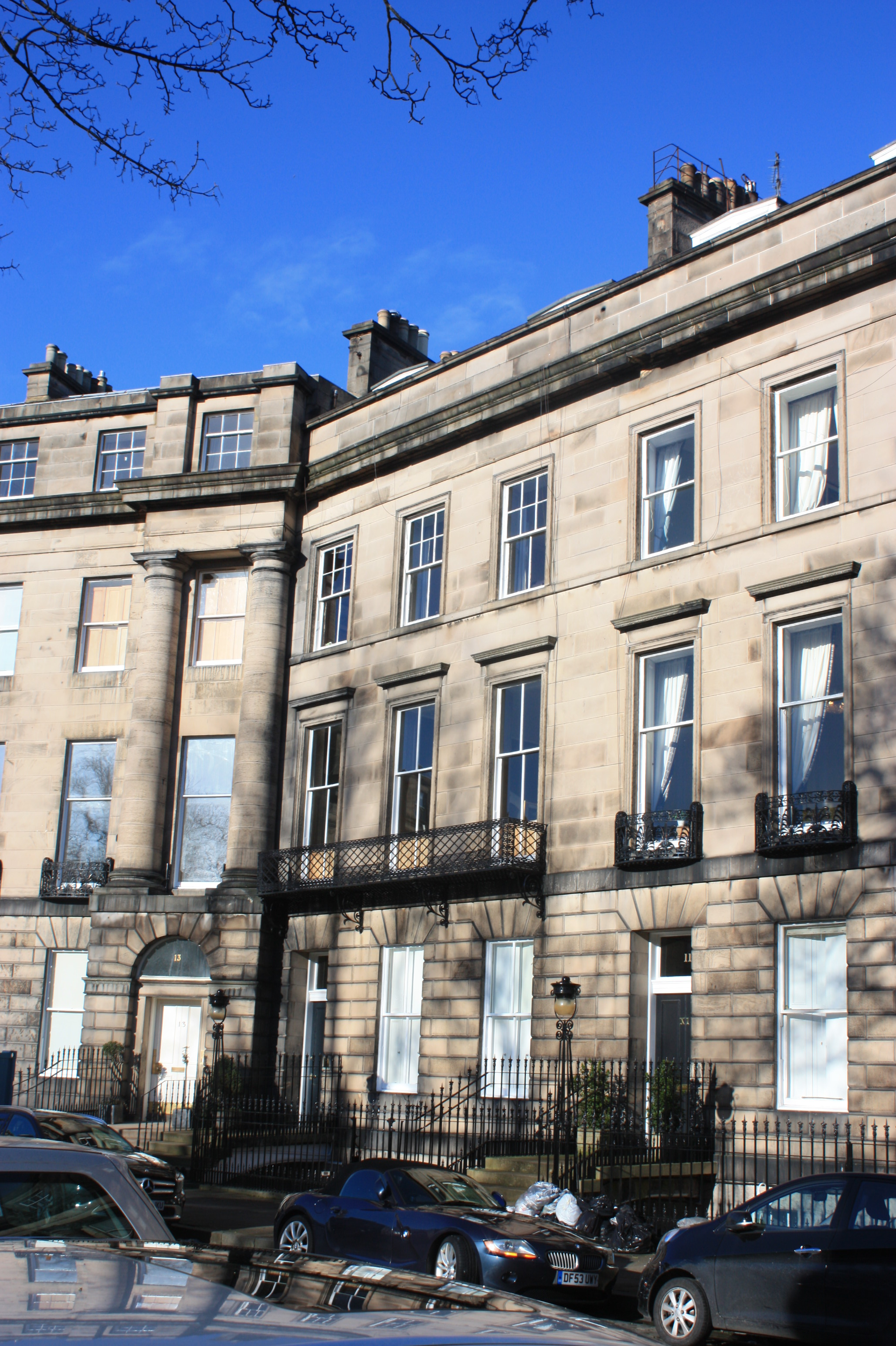
12 Moray Place, Edinburgh

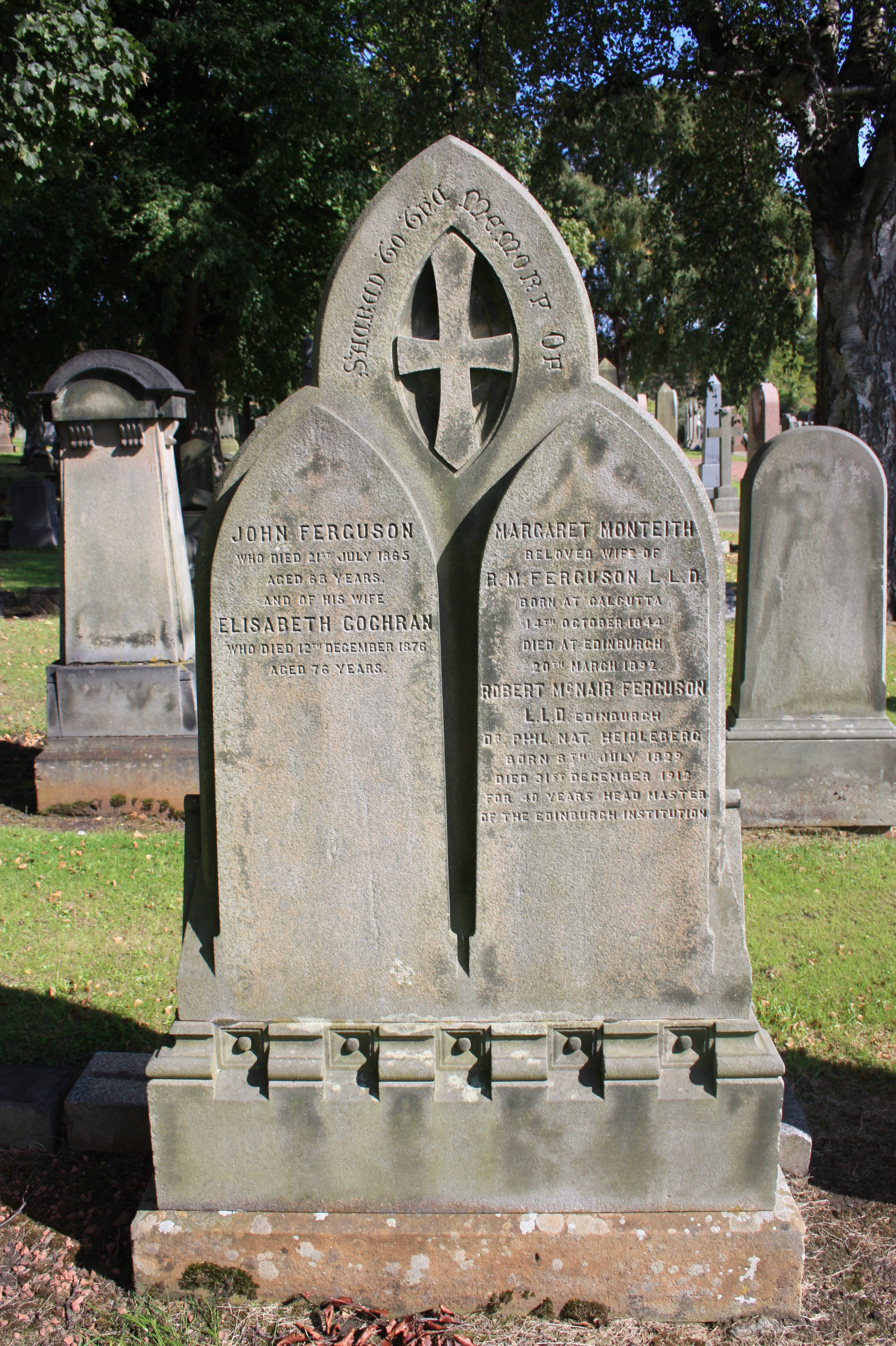
The grave of Robert McNair Ferguson, Grange Cemetery, Edinburgh

He was born on 8 July 1829, the son of John Ferguson, a pawnbroker, and his wife, Elisabeth Cochran.

He was educated at the Free Church Training College (Edinburgh). He studied natural philosophy in the university of Edinburgh and, after, in the university of Heidelberg where he was awarded with a PhD in 1855 tutored by Robert Bunsen. From 1858 till his retirement in 1898 he was headmaster in the Edinburgh Institute (now known as Stewart's Melville College), where he taught among others William Cunningham. He lost a leg in a school laboratory explosion in 1897.

He was founding member of the Edinburgh Mathematical Society in 1883 and was elected his president in 1885–1886.

In later life he lived at 12 Moray Place, a substantial Georgian townhouse on the fashionable Moray Estate in Edinburgh's West End.

He died on 31 December 1912. He is buried in the south-east section of Grange Cemetery in south Edinburgh.

== Family ==
He was married to Margaret Monteith (1814-1892).
