= Stewart Andrew McDowall =

English biologist and philosopher

- Born: 1882; Bedford
- Died: 13 January 1935 (aged 52–53); Winchester
- Occupations: Biologist, writer

Stewart Andrew McDowall (1882 – 13 January 1935) was an English biologist, eugenicist and philosopher.

McDowall was born in Bedford. He was educated at St Paul's School and University College London and graduated in natural science from Trinity College, Cambridge in 1904. He worked in the zoological laboratory at Cambridge and was assistant superintendent of the university's Museum of zoology. In 1905, he was appointed as Professor of Biology at the Christian College in Madras. In 1906, he became assistant master at Winchester College where he later became senior science master.

McDowall was a Christian and was ordained in the Church of England in 1908. He was the chaplain at Winchester College. He was a fellow of the Physical Society of London and the Cambridge Philosophical Society. McDowall was a theistic evolutionist and wrote several works on this topic. He held the view that evolution was non-materialistic, progressive and supported the values of Christian cosmology. He was influenced by Henri Bergson. In 1923–1924, McDowall gave the Hulsean Lectures on Evolution, Knowledge and Revelation, which were described as "an extreme form of metaphysical idealism".

He was an active eugenicist and was the author of Biology and Mankind (1931), which advocated sterilization of the feeble-minded.

McDowall died in Winchester on 13 January 1935.

== Selected publications ==
- Evolution and Spiritual Life (1915)
- Seven Doubts of a Biologist (1917)
- Evolution and the Doctrine of the Trinity (1918)
- Beauty and the Beast: An Essay in Evolutionary Aesthetic (1920)
- Evolution, Knowledge and Revelation (1924)
- Creative Personality and Evolution (1928)
- Biology and Mankind (1931)
- Is Sin Our Fault? (1932)
