= Frederick Robert Tennant =

British theologian, philosopher of religion and author

- Born: 1 September 1866; Burslem, Staffordshire, England
- Died: 9 September 1957 (aged 91); Cambridge, Cambridgeshire, England
- Occupation: Theologian

Frederick Robert Tennant (1 September 1866 – 9 September 1957), best known as F. R. Tennant was a British theologian, philosopher of religion and author.

== Career ==
Tennant studied mathematics, physics, biology, and chemistry at Caius College, Cambridge (1885–89) prior to becoming a theologian. After hearing the 1889 Thomas Henry Huxley lectures, Tennant's interest in religion grew in the 1890s, ultimately leading him to prepare for ordination in the Church of England. While he was ordained, he taught science at Newcastle-under-Lyme High School (1891–94), and became a lecturer in Theology and fellow of Trinity College, Cambridge in 1913.

As an Anglican theologian, Tennant assimilated much of Huxley's lectures, culminating in the 1901–1902 Hulsean Lecture entitled Origin and Propagation of Sin where he integrated evolutionary ideas into a Christian synthesis.

One of Tennant's goals in his writings was an integrative synthesis of the doctrines of the fall and original sin with Huxley’s claims of conflict between Darwinian thought and Christianity.

== Evolution and purpose ==
Tennant believed that the existence of a god was needed to explain the alleged purposive quality of evolution. Tennant was the first theist widely known to put forward such an argument. In volume 2 of his book Philosophical Theology he says:

"The multitude of interwoven adaptations by which the world is constituted a theatre of life, intelligence, and morality, cannot reasonably be regarded as an outcome of mechanism, or of blind formative power, or aught but purposive intelligence."

He was an advocate of theistic evolution. Tennant made an argument from design from the "quality of the evolution process".

== Publications ==
- The Nature of Belief The Centenary Press (1938)
- Philosophical Theology, Vol. 1: The Soul and Its Faculties Cambridge University Press (1968) (originally 1928)
- Philosophical Theology, Volume 2, The University Press, 1968 (originally 1930)
- The origin and propagation of sin: being the Hulsean Lectures delivered before the University of Cambridge in 1901–1902 Cornell University Library (1 May 2009) (originally 1908)
- With Alan Tennant The Sources of the Doctrines of the Fall and Original Sin (2012) RareBooksClub.com ISBN 978-1152479906
- The Concept of Sin (2012) General Books LLC ISBN 978-1151101518
