= Compatriots Club =

The Compatriots Club was an unofficial grouping of British Conservatives between 1904 and 1914. According to E. H. H. Green, the club "was made up of a membership of Conservative MPs, academics, journalists, and writers, functioned as a form of 'think tank' to generate Conservative ideas on the economy, imperial relations, defence, and other issues." Members included William Cunningham, William Hewins, William Ashley, Lord Milner, Leo Amery, John Waller Hills, and Arthur Steel-Maitland. The theme of the club was a hostility to laissez-faire and individualism with an affinity to collectivism.

== Publications ==
- Compatriots' Club Lectures: First Series (1905)
