= Ellen McArthur =

British economic historian

Ellen McArthur FRHistS
- Born: Ellen Annette McArthur; 19 June 1862; Duffield, Derbyshire, England
- Died: 4 September 1927 (aged 65); Cambridge, England

Academic background
- Education: Girton College, Cambridge
- Academic advisor: William Cunningham

Academic work
- Discipline: History
- Sub-discipline: Economic history
- Notable students: M. Dorothy George
- Notable works: "Women Petitioners and the Long Parliament" (1909)

Ellen Annette McArthur FRHistS (1862–1927) was a British economic historian.

== Biography ==
Ellen Annette McArthur was born on 19 June 1862 in Duffield, Derbyshire. She was educated at Girton College, Cambridge, where she later became the tutor in history. In 1893 she became the first female lecturer at the University of Cambridge Local Examinations & Lectures Syndicate. She was the first woman to receive the degree of Doctor of Letters from Trinity College Dublin, under ad eundem arrangements (see steamboat ladies).

Among the publications she contributed to were Outlines of English Industrial History, Dictionary of Political Economy, and the English Historical Review.

McArthur died of illness on 4 September 1927. She never married and had no children. A monetary endowment created by her will at the University of Cambridge, the Ellen McArthur Fund, has supported lectures, research studentships, and other awards relating to economic history.

In 2017, she featured in a conference, London's Women Historians, held at the Institute of Historical Research.

== See also ==
- Annie Abram
- Steamboat ladies
