= William Hunt (priest, born 1842) =

English cleric and historian (1842–1931)

William Hunt (1842–1931) was an English clergyman and historian.

== Life ==
He was educated at Harrow School and Trinity College, Oxford. He was vicar of Congresbury, Somerset from 1867 to 1882, and then went to London as a reviewer and contributor to the Dictionary of National Biography. He was President of the Royal Historical Society from 1905 to 1909. Hunt wrote over 200 of the Anglo-Saxon entries in the Dictionary of National Biography, including for Wulfstan the Cantor.

== Works ==
He wrote:

- The Somerset Diocese, Bath and Wells (1885)
- Bristol (1887), part of the 'Historic Towns' series edited by Hunt and Prof. Edward Augustus Freeman.
- The English Church in the Middle Ages (1888)
- The English Church, 597-1066 (1899), the first volume in a series of which he was editor
- the tenth volume of Political History of England (1905–07), of which he was joint editor with R. Lane-Poole
- The Irish Parliament (1907), edited from a contemporary manuscript.

Academic offices
Preceded by George Walter Prothero	President of the Royal Historical Society; 1905–1909	Succeeded by William Cunningham
