= Francis Ernest Hutchinson =

Francis Ernest Hutchinson, FBA (17 September 1871 – 24 December 1947) was an English literary scholar and Anglican clergyman.

The son of a priest, he attended Lancing College and Trinity College, Oxford. Ordained a priest in 1897, he was a schoolmaster from 1895 to 1903. He was then chaplain of King's College, Cambridge (1903–12), vicar of Leyland (1912–20), lecturer and secretary to the Delegacy for Extramural Studies at the University of Oxford (1920–34), and chaplain (1928–35) and fellow (1934–35) of All Souls College, Oxford. He was also a canon of Worcester from 1934 to 1943 and was active in the Workers' Educational Association. He was the Hulsean Lecturer in 1918–19, received a Doctor of Letters degree from the University of Oxford in 1942, and was elected a fellow of the British Academy two years later.
