= John Fenwick Kitto =

English Anglican clergyman and author

Reverend John Fenwick Kitto Vicar of St Martin-in-the-Fields
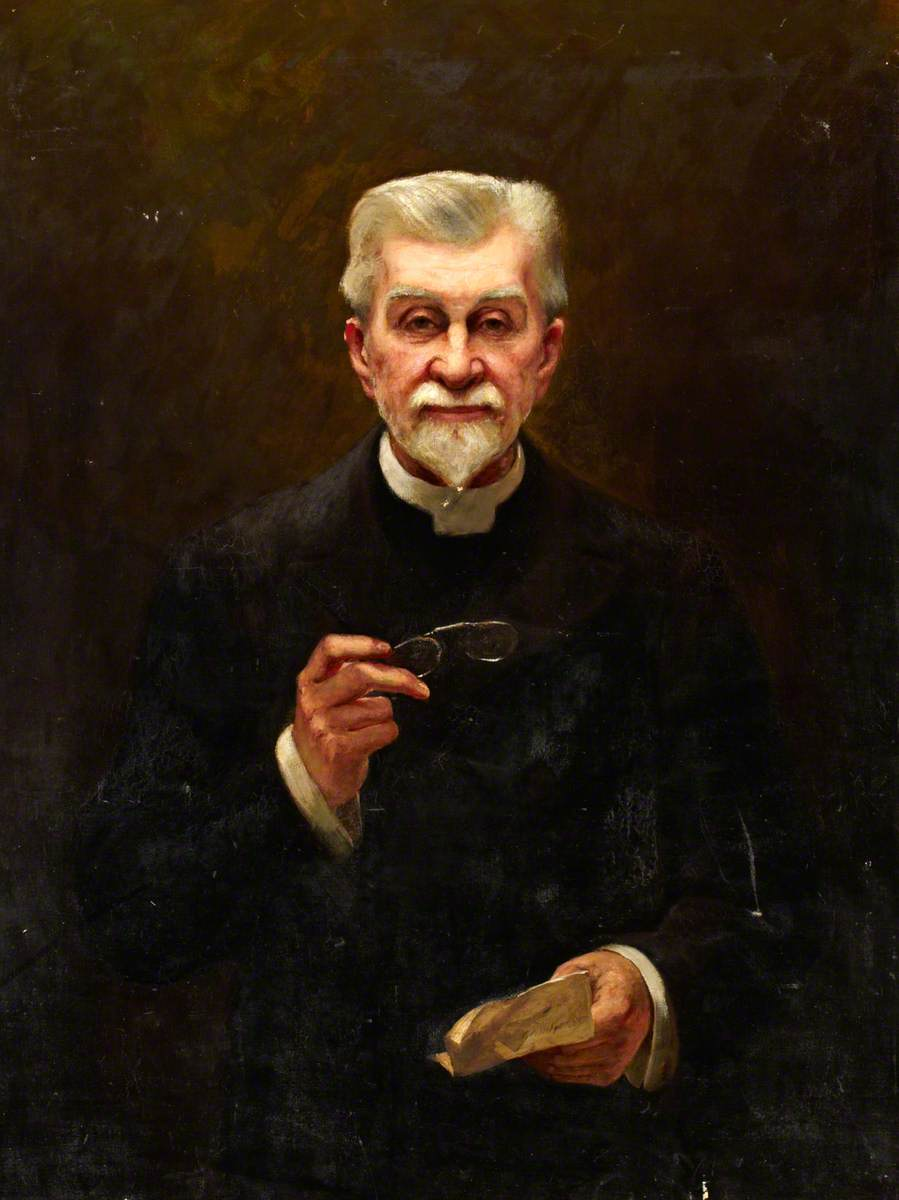
- Reverend John Fenwick Kitto (1837–1903) Artist Unknown c.1880, Tower Hamlets Local History Library and Archives
- Church: Church of England
- Appointed: 1886
- Term ended: 13 April 1903
- Predecessor: William Gilson Humphry
- Successor: Leonard Edmund Shelford
- Previous posts: Rector of Stepney, Rector of Whitechapel

Orders
- Ordination: 1862 by Archibald Campbell Tait

Personal details
- Born: 31 December 1837 Islington, London
- Died: 13 April 1903 (aged 65) London, England
- Denomination: Anglican
- Parents: John Kitto and Annabella Fenwick
- Spouse: Elizabeth Symon
- Education: St. Alban's Hall, Oxford University

John Fenwick Kitto (31 December 1837 – 13 April 1903) was an English Anglican clergyman and author. He founded and participated in various charitable causes, with a focus on London's East End. He served in positions including Rector of Whitechapel, Rector of Stepney, Vicar of St Martin-in-the-Fields, and Honorary Chaplain to the Queen.

== Early life and education ==
John Fenwick Kitto was born on 31 December 1837 in Islington, London, England. His father, John Kitto, was a reverend and writer of Biblical topics. His mother was Annabella Fenwick, who had married John Kitto on 21 September 1833 at Christ Church on Newgate Street, while the church was undergoing reparations.

Kitto attended North London Collegiate School in Camden Town, where he was educated by the headmaster Dr. Williams. He then studied at St. Alban's Hall, Oxford University, where in 1860 he placed Second Class in Mathematics and graduated with a bachelor of arts. He returned in 1870 for a master's degree.

== Career ==
=== Curate of St. Pancras ===
Kitto was ordained in 1862 by the Bishop of London, Archibald Campbell Tait, and served as Curate of St. Pancras under William Weldon Champneys from 1862 to 1866. While serving as Curate of St. Pancras, he was invited to join the Committee of the Church of England Sunday-School Institute, and became the first clergyman to occupy the position of chairman, which he served as for twenty-one years.

=== Vicar of St. Matthias Old Church ===
In 1867, he was appointed by Tait as the first incumbent vicar of St. Matthias Old Church. The chapel, formerly called Poplar Chapel and dating to 1776, had been a chapel of the British East India Company, but became an ecclesiastical parish of the Church of England in 1866. It was consecrated by the Archbishop of Armagh in 1867.

The year Kitto took the vicarage, London's East End saw a localized outbreak of cholera that killed over five-thousand people caused by the incomplete state of London's sewer system in the East End, which was still undergoing construction, and negligence by the East London Waterworks Company allowing sewage to enter drinking water. Due to the outbreak of cholera and the mass closing of industrial workplaces such as shipbuilding yards, ironworks, and factories, many inhabitants of the East End were facing increased pressure for work, with poverty and starvation rising. Because of this, and using his position in the clergy, Kitto devised an emigration plan and enlisted others to help him establish the East End Emigration Relief Fund, which would relocate poverty-stricken families to better circumstances abroad.

==== Restoration of St. Matthias Old Church ====
Restoration of the church began in 1867, with funds raised from Poplar and the Isle of Dogs. William Milford Teulon served as architect, while the firm Crabb & Vaughan carried out the chief duty of providing new pews. This period of restoration included a new chancel, porch, and turret, removal of the north and south galleries, marbling columns, a hot water heating system, lighting, ventilation in the ceiling, a pulpit, a Neo-Norman style font and a new organ provided by manufacturer William Hill & Son. It was the first church to feature electric lighting. A second restoration period occurred in 1870–1872, led by Teulon's junior partner Edwyn Evans Cronk and carried out by J. Kemp Coleman, a Poplar-native builder who had previously served as a churchwarden. The church had stained-glass windows fitted by Lavers & Barraud. The external restoration comprised the cladding of the elevations in Kentish ragstone, refenestration with Venetian-styled tracery to suit the roundheaded windows, furnishing a new roof in slate, and providing a new zinc-clad turret that was fitted over the former Georgian-style turret, reusing the earlier ball finial and weathervane. The final stage of restorations, planned for 1875–1876, saw some difficulty. Teulon's plans were harshly criticized by other architects, including George Edmund Street, and left in 1875 after he had a falling-out with Kitto. Cronk and Coleman oversaw the restoration, with a stained-glass crucifixion with scenes from the Passion and the Four Evangelists (designed by Lavers and Barraud) being added to the east window and the chancery being completed.

==== Charitable work in Poplar ====
While serving as Vicar of St. Matthias, Kitto also established a mission house and served as Honorable Secretary to the Committee of the Poplar Hospital for Accidents. The hospital, founded in 1855, specifically provided for people wounded while working at the docks. He also started a convalescent home for East End poor, which was maintained at Reigate.

=== Rector of Whitechapel ===
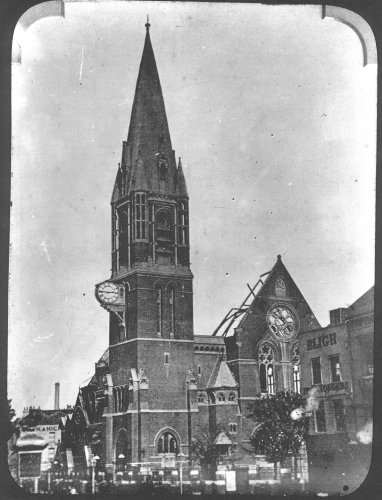
St. Mary Matfelon church after the 1880 fire

In 1875, Kitto was presented by Bishop Jackson to the rectory of Whitechapel, where he was to oversee the rebuilding of the parish church (St. Mary Matfelon) with funds donated by Octavius Coope. Kitto designed an open-air pulpit for the church, the first in England since the Reformation. The church was opened and consecrated in February 1877. This church, the third on the site, suffered a fire in 1880, with only the vestry, tower, and church rooms remaining.

==== Charitable works in Whitechapel ====
While in Whitechapel, Kitto established an expansive network of charitable organizations including the 'Invalids and Sick Children's Dinner Fund' which provided about three-thousand meals annually, a convalescent home, a burial programme for the poor, a home for training young women as domestic servants, and a playground for poor children in the parish.

=== Rector of Stepney ===
Prior to the fire at St. Mary Matfelon, Kitto was appointed by Walsham How to the Rectory of Stepney, the mother parish of the entire East London. He remained at Whitechapel long enough to arrange the rebuilding of the church. The Rectory of Stepney had previously been held by Joseph Bardsley, who had vacated it for the Vicarage of Bradford by the Simeon Trust. While serving as Rector of Stepney, he was appointed Select Preacher to the University of Cambridge. While much of the social welfare work undertaken by the Anglican church in the East End did improve conditions, it did not increase church attendance, which slowly diminished alongside the rise of Eastern European Jewish immigration and population reduction through slum clearance. In 1885–1886, Kitto oversaw the restoration of St. Dunstan's, Stepney, where the interior was cleaned and painted and the east window, pulpit, and extra seating were added.

In 1885, a Church journal described him as "a Low Churchman of Liberal views, [...] with considerable organising ability" and as "[...] an able preacher."

==== East End Emigration Society ====
In 1882, Kitto founded the East End Emigration Society, following his existing work with emigration. The society was founded with the intention of sending poverty-stricken East-Enders to Canada, pay for their first few months, and help them find employment. Poor families and boys were sent to the Andrews Home located at 46 Belmont Park in Montreal, Quebec, which was maintained primarily by endowment and under the jurisdiction of the Anglican Synod of Montreal.

=== Vicar of St Martin-in-the-Fields ===
In 1886, Kitto was appointed to the Vicarage of St Martin-in-the-Fields, following William Gilson Humphry. He worked alongside Robert Claudius Billing and Walsham How on missions in East London and joined the National Association for Promoting State Colonization, an organization which emerged in the 1880s as a response to economic distress and succeeded in procuring state subsidization for emigration to the colonies. In 1889 he was made Chaplain to the Queen. In 1896, Kitto was made Honorary Chaplain and Chaplain-in-Ordinary to Queen Victoria and Prebendary of St. Paul's Cathedral. In 1901, following Queen Victoria's death, he held the position of Honorary Chaplain to the King.

=== Founding of organizations ===
In 1892, alongside Louisa Magenis (the daughter of the 3rd Earl of Belmore) and with patronage from Prince Christian, Kitto opened and managed the Rehearsal Club, which provided a place for theatre personnel to rest, read, eat, drink, and socialize safely and at a modest price from eleven at night to eight in the morning, the "dead hours" between performance times. He also opened, in 1897, the Wantage Club, a club for waitresses and other restaurant and hotel staff that provided rest and recreation for off-duty workers, including a library and entertainments.

== Death ==
Kitto died on 13 April 1903, in London. He was succeeded as Vicar of St Martin-in-the-Fields by Leonard Edmund Shelford.

== Personal life ==
Kitto married Elizabeth Symon, only daughter of Adam Symon of Dundee, in Christ Church Surbiton Hill in November 1865. She was an avid supporter of his charitable works and personally assisted in provided for the poor. Kitto described himself as a teetotaller.
