= Francis Kitto =

British flying ace (1897–1926)

Francis Mansel Kitto
- Born: 1 January 1897; Pontypridd, Rhondda Cynon Taf, Wales
- Died: 25 June 1926 (aged 29); Pontypridd Cottage Hospital
- Military career
- Allegiance: United Kingdom
- Branch: British Army; Royal Air Force
- Rank: Captain
- Units: Welch Regiment; No. 43 Squadron RFC; No. 49 Squadron RFC; No. 54 Squadron RAF
- Awards: Military Cross

Captain Francis Mansel Kitto MC (1 January 1897 – 25 June 1926) was a Welsh-born flying ace credited with nine official aerial victories during World War I.

== Early life ==
Kitto was born at Pontypridd, now in Rhondda Cynon Taf, Wales, on New Year's Day 1897. His parents were Mr. and Mrs. J. B. Kitto.

== World War I ==
On 9 November 1916, Kitto was transferred from the Welch Regiment, into which he was commissioned as a temporary second lieutenant in October 1915, to the Royal Flying Corps (RFC); he was commissioned a second lieutenant and appointed a flying officer. By early 1917, he was posted to 43 Squadron on the Western Front. Using a Sopwith 1 1/2 Strutter, on 17 March 1917, he drove down a German Albatros D.II east of Arras for his first aerial victory. He repeated his feat on both 8 April and 17 August 1917. He then transferred to 54 Squadron as a Sopwith Camel pilot. On 1 December 1917, temporary lieutenant Kitto was appointed a flight commander, with the usual promotion to temporary captain. Between 15 March and 4 July 1918, he scored six more aerial victories, to bring his total to four German planes destroyed and five driven down out of control. On 22 June 1918, he was awarded the Military Cross for his exploits. His citation read:

Temporary Captain Francis Mansel Kitto, General List and R.F.C.

"For conspicuous gallantry and devotion to duty. While engaged in attacking ground targets with machine-gun fire and bombs he observed a large party of troops, amongst whom he dropped the remainder of his bombs with the most excellent results. On a later occasion he attacked a formation of enemy scouts, and having caused one of these to crash to the ground, he pursued another and attacked it eleven miles behind the enemy's lines, bringing it to the ground and destroying it. In addition to these he has shot down two other hostile machines, and has shown throughout, the greatest determination and dash."

== Postwar career ==
Kitto transferred to piloting Airco DH.9 bombers during 1919. On 24 June 1924, Kitto was granted a Class A commission in the Royal Air Force as a flying officer on probation. He was confirmed in his rank on 24 December 1924.

Francis Mansel Kitto died in Pontypridd Cottage Hospital, Wales on 25 June 1926.

== Bibliography ==
- Franks, Norman (2003). Sopwith Camel Aces of World War 1: Volume 52 of Aircraft of the Aces. London, UK: Osprey Publishing. ISBN 978-1-84176-534-1.
