= Rehearsal Club (London) =

The Rehearsal Club was a London club providing support to actresses, ballet dancers and music hall chorus girls. The club provided a space to rest, read, eat and socialize between morning and evening performances. It was founded in 1892 by the Rev. John Fenwick Kitto, vicar of St Martin-in-the-Fields, with the support of Prince Christian, who became the club's president. It seems to have been based at different times at 29 Leicester Square and at Cranbourne Street.
