= William Gilson Humphry =

English clergyman

William Gilson Humphry (1815–1886) was an English clergyman and academic.

== Life ==
Humphry was born at Sudbury, Suffolk, on 30 January 1815, son of William Wood Humphry, barrister-at-law, and brother of George Murray Humphry. Humphry was educated at Carmalt's school, Putney, and then at Shrewsbury School, under Dr. Samuel Butler, becoming captain of the school. In 1833 he entered Trinity College, Cambridge, and in 1835 gained the Pitt Scholarship. Two years later he graduated as senior classic, second chancellor's medallist, and twenty-seventh wrangler, and in 1839 he was elected a Fellow of his college.

Humphry was intended for the legal profession, but in 1842 he took holy orders. For some years he worked at Cambridge, acting as steward and assistant tutor of Trinity, and he was proctor of the university in 1845–6. From 1847 to 1855 he was examining chaplain to Charles Blomfield, bishop of London. In 1852 Humphry became rector of Northolt, Middlesex. From 1855 until his death in 1886 he was vicar of St Martin-in-the-Fields, London.

He was appointed Hulsean lecturer for 1849 and 1850, and Boyle lecturer for 1857 and 1858, was a member of the royal commission on clerical subscription in 1865, and of the ritual commission in 1869, and was one of the company appointed by Convocation in 1870 for the revision of the authorised version of the New Testament. He was one of the treasurers of the Society for Promoting Christian Knowledge, at a difficult period for the Society. He gave special attention to the educational institutions of his parish.

He died on 10 January 1886, and was buried in Brompton Cemetery.

== Family ==
In 1852 he married Caroline Maria, only daughter of George D'Oyly, D.D., rector of Lambeth. On 6 April 1875 their daughter Mary Caroline married the scholar Arthur John Butler (1844–1910).
