= Christopher Benson (theologian) =

English Anglican priest and theologian (1788–1868)

The Reverend Christopher Benson
- Born: 16 January 1788; Cockermouth, England
- Died: 25 March 1868 (aged 80); Ross on Wye, England
- Spouse: Bertha Maria Mitford (m. 1826)

Ecclesiastical career
- Religion: Christianity (Anglican)
- Church: Church of England
- Ordained: c. 1812

Academic background
- Education: Trinity College, Cambridge

Academic work
- Discipline: Theology
- Institutions: Magdalene College, Cambridge

Christopher Benson (1788–1868) was an English theologian who achieved prominence on account of his abilities as a preacher and lecturer. In 1820 he was chosen as the first Hulsean Lecturer. Later he was one of the first to apply the term Tractarians to John Keble, Edward Pusey, and other pioneers of what came to be known as the Oxford Movement within the Church of England. Christopher Benson was not a supporter, and engaged in high-profile theological controversies on matters such as the "apostolical authority of the Fathers".

== Life ==
Benson was born on 16 January 1788 at Cockermouth, a country town in the far north-west of England. His father, Thomas Benson, was a solicitor. He attended Eton College before winning a scholarship to Trinity College, Cambridge, in 1804. Five years later he emerged with a BA degree. He received his MA degree six years after that, in 1815. Meanwhile, he was ordained, and was appointed in 1812 as a curate at St. John's parish in Newcastle upon Tyne. A few years later he was appointed to a curacy at St Giles in the Fields in London where he would preach his farewell sermon only in September 1826. By that time, however, much of his focus had been back in Cambridge for some years.

In 1817 Christopher Benson was selected to give a series of sermons at Cambridge University, which were subsequently printed. Two years later he published "The Chronology of Our Saviour's Life". The book opens with a dedication to John Kaye, at that time the Master of Christ's College. His reputation rising, in 1820 he was selected to give the Hulsean Lectures in what was the inaugural year for an annual lecture series that continues to feature at Cambridge. The lectures were duly published, and were reprinted several times. This time the dedication was jointly to William Frere and James Wood, the masters respectively of Downing College and St. John's College. In the early nineteenth century it was still possible for a lecturer to be invited to present a second series of Hulsean Lectures, and for 1822 Benson was again the Hulsean lecturer and again the lectures were published, this time as twenty discourses "on Scripture Difficulties".

The second volume of Hulsean lectures was dedicated not to more masters of Cambridge colleges but to "Granville Hastings Wheler of ... Kent [and] ... Ledstone Hall in the County of Yorkshire". Wheler had influence in the west of Yorkshire because of an inheritance involving his kinswoman, Lady Elizabeth Hastings, and it was as a result of his intervention that in 1822 Christopher Benson became vicar of Ledsham, a post which for the time being he was able to combine with being a fellow of Magdalene College, Cambridge.

In 1825 Benson was appointed canon at Worcester Cathedral, a position he would retain for more than forty years. He was also appointed, successively, parish minister for Lindridge and Cropthorne (both parishes being near to Worcester). He was also, from 1827 till 1845 Master of the Temple, one of two responsible incumbent clergy at the Temple Church in central London.

Through his career Benson retained his power as a preacher. He adhered to what one source describes as the 'broader evangelical school', which places him add odds with the evolving Oxford Movement and any other potentially exclusionist currents in the church. He was also highly critical of the "prominence assigned to tradition" which involved him in a fierce public controversy. In addition, he published further theological works.

== Personal ==
Christopher Benson married Bertha Maria Mitford (1804–1873), the daughter of a London lawyer (and a distant kinswoman of the writer Nancy Mitford and her sisters), on 27 July 1826. He predeceased his wife by approximately five years when he died on 25 March 1868 at Ross on Wye.

Academic offices
New post	Hulsean Lecturer; 1820	Succeeded by James Clarke Franks
