= Annie Abram =

British historian (1869–1930)

Annie Abram FRHistS
- Born: 1869; Clerkenwell, England
- Died: 1930 (aged 60–61); Aldrington, England
- Education: Girton College, Cambridge; London School of Economics
- Occupation: Historian

Signature
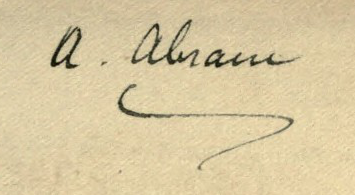

Annie Abram FRHistS (1869–1930) was a British historian of medieval life. She was made a Royal Historical Society fellow in 1911.

== Life ==
Abram was born in Clerkenwell in 1869 and her mother died shortly afterwards.

Abram went to study and take the tripos at Girton College, Cambridge under William Cunningham and Ellen McArthur. As she was a woman, a Cambridge degree was denied to her. She went to study further in Dublin where she was awarded a degree in 1906 and she was awarded a doctorate by the London School of Economics in 1909.

She went on to teach at both Girton and Westfield Colleges, and she may have assisted at her father's law publishing firm in London.

Abram died unmarried in Aldrington in 1930. Some of her papers are at her alma mater.

== Books ==
Her first book was published in 1909, and was entitled The Effects Produced by Economic Changes Upon Social Life in England in the Fifteenth Century.

She later published her second book Social Life in England in the Fifteenth Century in 1913 which used misericords in part as a source.

In 1919 she published her third and final book, English Life and Manners in the Later Middle Ages summarising medieval society based on her own research of primary sources. The book covers the time from the Black Death which started in 1348 and goes on to include the whole of the fifteenth century.
