= John Kitto =

English biblical scholar of Cornish descent

- Born: 4 December 1804; Plymouth, England
- Died: 25 November 1854 (aged 49); Cannstatt, Kingdom of Württemberg, German Confederation

John Kitto (4 December 1804 – 25 November 1854) was an English biblical scholar.

== Biography ==
Born in Plymouth, the son of a Cornish stonemason, John Kitto was a sickly child. The drunkenness of his father and the poverty of his family meant that much of his childhood was spent in the workhouse. He had no more than three years of erratic and interrupted education. At the age of twelve John Kitto fell on his head from a rooftop, and became totally and permanently deaf. As a young man he suffered further tragedies, disappointments and much loneliness. His height was 4 ft 8 in, and his accident left him with an impaired sense of balance. He found consolation in browsing at bookstalls and reading any books that came his way.

From these hardships he was rescued by friends who became aware of his mental abilities and encouraged him to write topical articles for local newspapers, arranging eventually for him to work as an assistant in a local library. Here he continued to educate himself.

One of his benefactors was the Exeter dentist Anthony Norris Groves, who in 1824 offered him employment as a dental assistant. Living with the Groves family, Kitto was profoundly influenced by the practical Christian faith of his employer. In 1829 he accompanied Groves on his pioneering mission to Baghdad and served as tutor to Groves's two sons. In 1833 Kitto returned to England via Constantinople, accompanied by another member of the Groves mission, Francis William Newman. Shortly afterwards he married, and in due course had several children.

A London publisher asked Kitto to write up his travel journals for a series of articles in the Penny Magazine, a publication read at that time by a million people in Britain, reprinted in America and translated into French, German and Dutch. Other writing projects followed as readers enquired about his experiences in the East amidst people living in circumstances closely resembling those of Bible times.

== Scholarship ==
Kitto had been a careful observer of physical detail – the topography, the animals, architecture, agricultural methods, the manner of interaction between people. His retelling of Bible stories in the light of what he had seen brought the narratives to life and confirmed the accuracy of the ancient texts. He showed how the activities described by the prophets and apostles accorded with the realities of Eastern culture. He supplemented his own observations with details from the journals of other travellers, and helped the Bible reader to understand many things previously obscure or contradictory to the Western mind. His careful research into the geography, biology and archaeology of Bible lands served to support and encourage confidence in the accuracy of the Bible.

In his generation Dr Kitto was a most significant contributor to Christian scholarship, and he provided much help for Evangelicals defending the Bible against the attack of liberal critics. He eventually wrote a total of twenty-three books, of which Charles Spurgeon considered the Daily Bible Illustrations to be "more interesting than any novel that was ever written, and as instructive as the heaviest theology."

The sensible style that made Kitto so popular can be seen in this brief passage, written at a time when attempts to reconstruct the design of the Temple of Solomon on paper, in scale models, and in the architecture of churches, synagogues and Masonic Halls was a serious scholarly pursuit:

"These descriptions (found in Kings and Chronicles) enable us to realize a tolerably clear idea of many important details of this glorious structure; but they do not suffice to afford us a distinct notion of the architectural elevation of the principal buildings. If any proof of this fact were wanting, it would be found in the circumstance that almost every scholar or architect who has attempted to make a design of the fabric, from the description which exist in the Scripture and in Josephus, has furnished something very different from what has been produced by others making the same attempt."

John Kitto summed up his life in the following words:

"I perhaps have as much right as any man that lives, to bear witness that there is no one so low but that he may rise, no condition so cast down as to be really hopeless, and no privation which need, of itself, shut out any man from the paths of honourable exertion or from the hope of usefulness in life. I have sometimes thought that it was possibly my mission to affirm and establish these great truths."

== Tributes ==
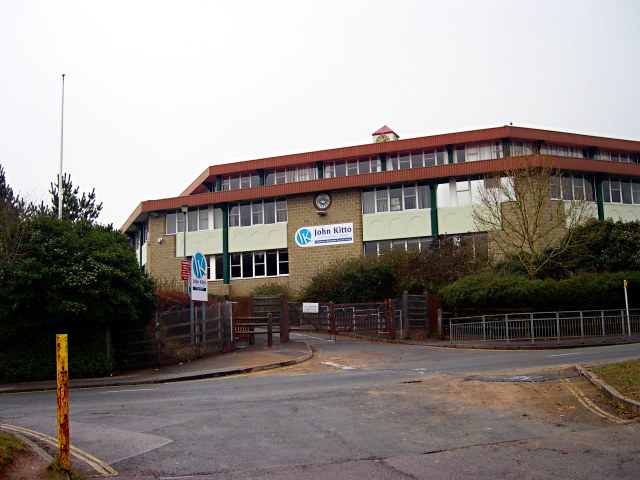
The John Kitto Community College in 2006

In 1844 the University of Giessen conferred upon him the degree of D.D. In 1850 he received a pension for life from the British government. He died on 25 November 1854 at Cannstatt in Germany.

Kitto Road in New Cross (South London), built in the late 19th century by the Worshipful Company of Haberdashers, is believed to have been named after John Kitto.

In 1989 the Burrington Secondary Modern School in Plymouth was renamed the John Kitto Comprehensive School in his honour, and later, the John Kitto Community College. In September 2010 it became the All Saints Church of England Academy, Plymouth.

== Family ==
John Kitto's son, John Fenwick Kitto, was an Anglican priest who served as Rector of Whitechapel, Rector of Stepney, and Vicar of St Martin-in-the-Fields.

== Selected works ==
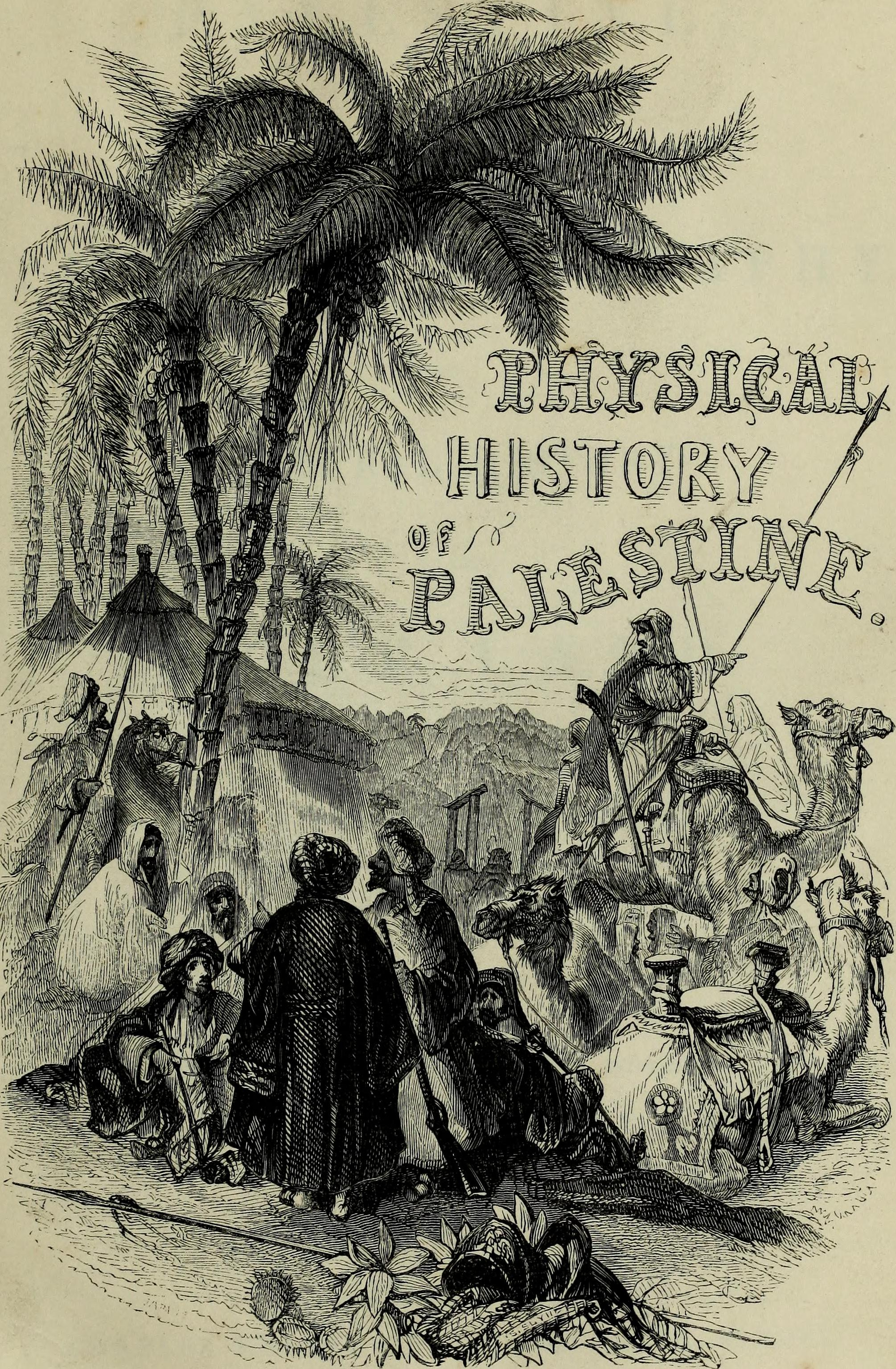
Palestine: the Physical Geography and Natural History of the Holy Land, Illustrated with Woodcuts (1841) title page

- Uncle Oliver's travels in Persia (1838)
- The Pictorial History of Palestine and The Holy Land including a Complete History of the Jews (1839–40)

Vol. I. Biblical History.
Vol. II. Biblical History, Continued. Natural History And Geography.

- Palestine: the Physical Geography and Natural History of the Holy Land, Illustrated with Woodcuts (1841)
- The History of Palestine, From the Patriarchal Age to the Present Time (Textbook 1843)

STANDARD SCHOOL BOOK - Price 3s. 6d., or with Map of Palestine, 4s.

THE HISTORY OF PALESTINE, FROM THE PATRIARCHAL AGE TO THE PRESENT TIME; With Introductory Chapters on the Geography and Natural History of the Country And on the Customs and Institutions of the Hebrews. By JOHN KITTO, D.D., F.S.A., Editor of the "Pictorial Bible", &c., &c. With Questions for Examination. By ALEX REID, A.M., Rector of Circus Place School.
This work has been undertaken with the view of supplying what has long been felt as a desideratum in Schools, —a History of Palestine, with Accounts of the Geography of the country, and of the Customs and Institutions of its ancient inhabitants, such as have been introduced with much advantage in recent school histories of other nations.
The History has been written expressly for its present use, and is in no respect an abridgment of the author's larger work, the Pictorial History of Palestine. In its preparation simplicity and precision of style qualifications so essential to the usefulness of a School-book have been steadily kept in view; and the descriptive portion of the work is liberally embellished with Wood Engravings, representing Landscapes, Buildings, Plants, Illustrations of Manners and Customs, and whatever can be more clearly displayed by pictorial than by written description, or by which the written text may be in any degree elucidated.
Although primarily intended for the use of Schools, the book will be found well suited for general purposes, being a complete Manual of Jewish History and Antiquities, and as such, proper to accompany the Sacred Volume as a popular digest of, and commentary on, all its material facts.

- The Gallery of Scripture Engravings (1843)
- A Cyclopaedia of Biblical Literature (appeared in two volumes in 1845 and edited under his superintendence); nearly all the geographical articles on places in Palestine were by Josias Leslie Porter
- The Lost Senses: Deafness And Blindness (1845)
- The Pictorial Sunday Book (1845)
- Ancient Jerusalem (1846)
- Modern Jerusalem (1847)
- The Olive, Vine and Palm (1848)
- The Court and People of Persia (1848)
- The Tabernacle and its Furniture (1849)
- Daily Bible Illustrations (8 vols. 1849–1853)
- The Bible history of the Holy Land (1850)
- Domestic Arrangements of the Orientals (1853)
- The Pictorial Bible – being the Old and New Testaments according to authorized versions. Illustrated with Steel Engravings and Woodcuts representing landscape scenes, and subjects of natural history, costume and antiquities with Original Notes by John Kitto, D.D., F.S.A. – New edition, with additional notes, based on discoveries of recent travellers (4 volume set); London: W & R Chambers (1866)
