= F. J. Foakes-Jackson =

British historian

- Born: 10 August 1855; Ipswich, Suffolk
- Died: 1 December 1941 (aged 86); Englewood, New Jersey
- Education: Trinity College, Cambridge
- Spouse(s): Anna Maria Everett (d. 1931); Clara Fawcett
- Scientific career
- Fields: Church history
- Workplaces: Jesus College, Cambridge; Union Theological Seminary, N. Y.
- Academic advisors: J. B. Lightfoot; F. J. A. Hort; Henry Barclay Swete; Henry Melvill Gwatkin
- Notable students: W. O. E. Oesterley

Frederick John Foakes-Jackson (10 August 1855 – 1 December 1941) was a Church historian. For thirty-four years he taught at Jesus College, Cambridge, serving as dean from 1895 to 1916. Then, at the age of 61, he became the Briggs Professor of Christian Institutions at Union Theological Seminary, New York City, finally becoming emeritus in 1933. He is probably best known for the massive five volume work The Beginnings of Christianity—an edition, translation, commentary, and study of the Acts of Apostles—that he conceived and edited with Kirsopp Lake.

== Family and early life ==
F. J. Foakes-Jackson was born at Ipswich, Suffolk, 10 August 1855, the son of the Revd Stephen Jackson and Catharine Cobbold. His father, who died before he was born, was the proprietor of the Ipswich Journal, a respected regional newspaper the family had operated since 1739. His mother was the daughter of Frederick Cobbold, of the 1st dragoon guards, a member of a distinguished Suffolk family. In 1858 she married Thomas Eyre Foakes, a barrister of the Inner Temple. When he began school at Brighton, he was registered as Frederick John Jackson Foakes, the same was true at Eton College. He subsequently changed it to Foakes-Jackson.

In a memoir he reports that as a result of this preparatory schooling he "was moderately well read in the classics" and "could write indifferent Latin verse and prose with some ease and had a limited knowledge of Greek." He had "read a good deal of English and Indian history." He had a "pretty sound acquaintance with such books as Gibbon's History and Adam Smith's Wealth of Nations and could have passed a fairly searching examination in the novels of Thackeray, Dickens, Lever and Harrison Ainsworth." As for other modern languages: "His French was that of Stratford-atte-Bowe. Of German he knew nothing." He reports that he had benefited greatly from his tutor at Eton: "I was under a man of extraordinary culture, a classicist, a man of letters, a linguist, one gifted in the artistic taste. After five years of almost constant strife, for I don't think we liked one another, I changed from being an idle little boy into a comparatively well educated man, with wide interests and respect for learning of every description."

== Student at Trinity College, Cambridge ==
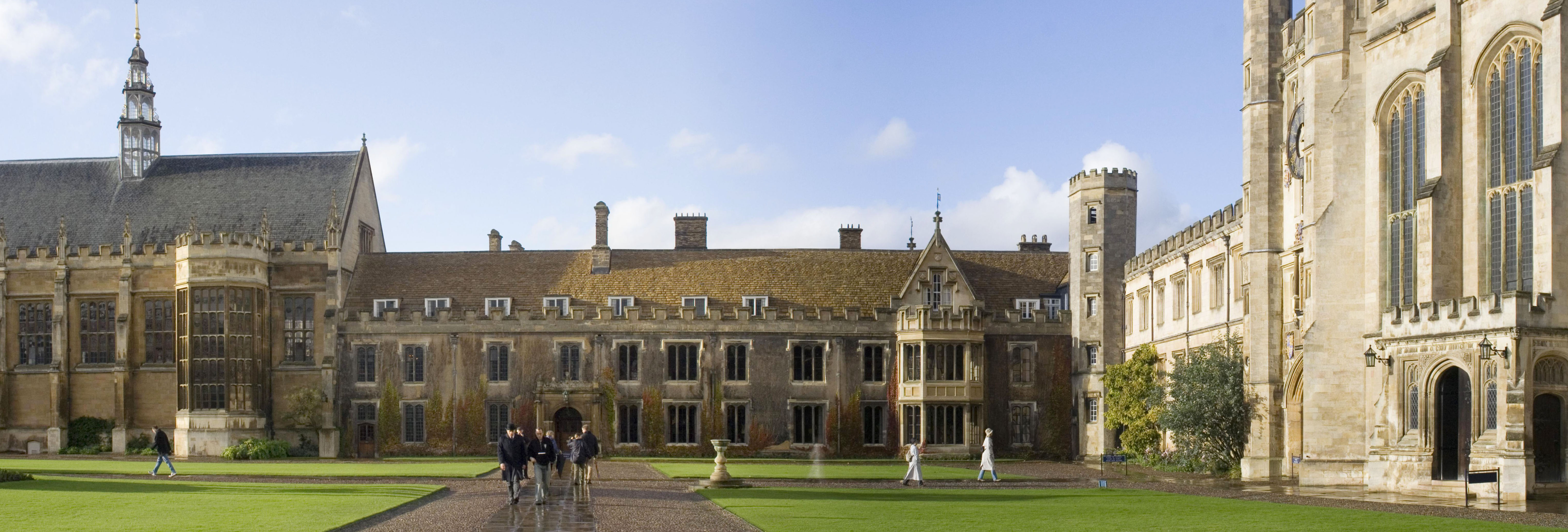
Trinity College, Cambridge

In 1875 Foakes-Jackson went up to Trinity College, Cambridge as an ordinary undergraduate, having failed to obtain a scholarship. As he explains in his memoir: "The natural thing at this time for such a boy was to read for classical honours. He could have done perhaps fairly well in the philosophical, historical and literary side, but Cambridge in his time wisely discouraged elegant triflers and demanded a severe and exact knowledge of Latin and Greek as languages. Our young friend liked to find out what a tragedy or comedy, a dialogue of Plato or a book of Thucydides was about, but the niceties of the language bored him, and to puzzle out a crabbed passage which was quite uninteresting when mastered, even supposing anyone capable of such a feat, seemed a needless waste of time when there were so many fascinating books to read. No wonder, therefore, he never got a classical scholarship and that he set himself to study theology as a totally new subject, which might become of use if he became a clergyman."

His principal teachers were J. B. Lightfoot, Henry Melvill Gwatkin, F. J. A. Hort, Henry Barclay Swete, and Robert Sinker. Lightfoot lectured in the immense dining hall of Trinity college on the Acts of the Apostles and the refutation of the anonymous work Supernatural Religion (later determined to be from Walter Richard Cassels). As Foakes-Jackson recalls, "Lightfoot was an admirable lecturer, his voice was clear, his arrangement lucid, his learning unquestionable." However, the "behavior of the audiences was not edifying. The virtuous attended and took notes, the studious devoted themselves to their own subjects, and read books bearing on them, the frivolous read novels, the utterly profane played surreptitious games of cards, the rest slept." "Gwatkin, who had no recognized position in the faculty, was a real lecturer, brilliant, incisive and even humorous." Yet the most profit was derived from Hort and Swete. "Hort lectured on Origen contra Celsum in his private rooms in Emmanuel College to a class of about five, which fell to two before he had given many lectures; but, though there was little to inspire, there was a great deal to be learned. He really showed how a subject ought to be tackled, and the impression produced on his hearer's mind was, 'This is learning.' Swete, less original but a most profound student of dogmatic theology, was almost equally instructive, and both of them deserve the gratitude of a young student for shewing him what it meant to know a subject thoroughly." However, the bulk of his instruction came from his private tutor, the Revd Robert Sinker, Librarian of Trinity College and "a Hebraist of the old school." Under Sinker he was awarded the Jeremie Septuagint Prize in his second year (1877). Two years later (1879) he would win the Scholfield Prize in Biblical Greek and earn his B.A., taking a first class in Theology tripos with a distinction in Hebrew.

Following his graduation, financial circumstances forced him to withdraw from the university. He was ordained a deacon 8 June 1879 and became the curate of Ottershaw, Surrey, 1879–81, being ordained priest 23 May 1880. He maintained his ties to the university and was able to secure the Crosse Divinity Scholarship (1879) and the next year, the Lightfoot Scholarship in Ecclesiastical History (1880), finally receiving his M.A. in 1882. He continued as curate of St Giles' Church, Cambridge, 1882–84, and St Botolph's Church, Cambridge, 1884–90.

== Fellow at Jesus College, Cambridge ==
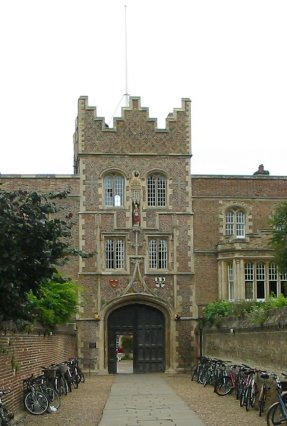
Jesus College, Cambridge

In October 1882 Foakes-Jackson became chaplain and lecturer in divinity and Hebrew at Jesus College, Cambridge. He was elected fellow in 1886 and also became an assistant tutor the same year. He served as dean of the college from 1895 until 1916; Junior Proctor 1894; Senior Proctor 1909. He was appointed examining chaplain to the bishop of Peterborough, 1897–1912, and honorary Canon of Peterborough, 1901–1927. He was also select preacher at Cambridge in 1885, 1887, 1892, 1909, and Hulsean Lecturer in 1902. He was awarded a BD in 1903, and DD in 1905.

"My work was certainly varied," Foakes-Jackson recalled in a memoir, "I had to send my men to various lecturers in other colleges and to deliver my own generally on the Old Testament and church history. As a rule these classes were somewhat informal. I initiated classes or individuals into the mysteries of the Hebrew verb, and listened to others stumbling over the correct translation of the Pauline Epistles. ... My work was unmethodical and unscientific but I had always to keep in mind that every pupil had to be examined by other people and that my instruction was to be tested by my colleagues and not by myself." In assessing his work, H. D. A. Major maintains that research "was not really his sphere. His gifts were primarily those of an educationist. His writings have always seemed to us to have been characterized, not by profound learning nor accurate scholarship, but by real insight, lucid exposition, and arresting freshness of treatment. He had a great gift of humour, and he selected illuminating, unforgettable incidents and dicta to illustrate his expositions. He was one of the most inspiring of tutors and produced a great body of brilliant pupils. It was said that at one time there were no less than ten Deans of Cambridge Colleges who had been tutored by Foakes-Jackson." H. G. Wood, in the preface to his Hulsean Lectures of 1933, recalled that "He combined a sense of the relative importance of different events, movements, and tendencies, with an interest in often trivial but piquant detail. To read under his guidance was to begin to appreciate the true standards of historical significance."

P. Gardner-Smith, who studied under Foakes-Jackson and became dean six years after his departure, recalls that he had "a flair for penetrating a mass of detail to point out the essential facts, and he could make any subject interesting. This was due to his remarkable personality. Never well off, he loved to be hospitable, and taught his students to appreciate good wine. He was described as the last eighteenth-century wit, and his conversation was characterized by shrewd humour; this, combined with his personal eccentricities and his unfailing kindness, made him immensely popular." Known as Foakie by his intimates, he was in his early days a prominent oarsman and served as the treasurer of the Cambridge University Boat Club 1895–1910. In fact he had an intense interest in English sport and felt it was an important part of university life. In 1907 he would write: "It is all very well, however, to write philosophically on all the possible evils of athleticism, but imagine an Oxford or Cambridge full of mild effeminate youths intent on nothing but succeeding in examinations. How soon should we sigh for the old barbarism! Athletics at least keep the atmosphere pure and manly, and its effects for good are seen in almost every department." Also during his Cambridge years Foakes-Jackson held high office among the Freemasons, being Grand Chaplain of the Grand Lodge of England, 1907–1908, and the Grand Superintendent of the Royal Arch, Cambridgeshire, until 1919. He was a member of Isaac Newton University Lodge.

== Professor at Union Theological Seminary ==
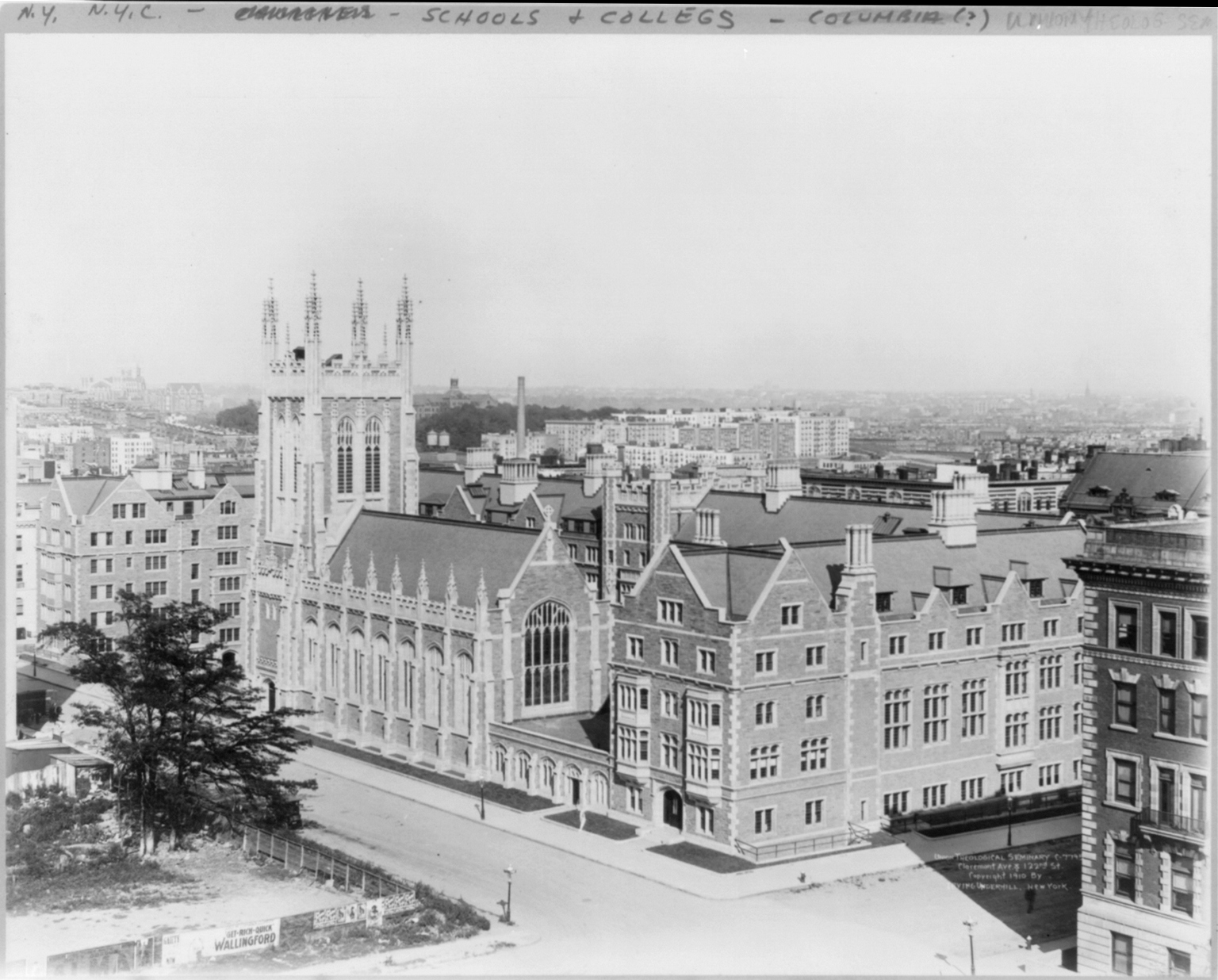
Union Theological Seminary in the City of New York in 1910

In 1916 Foakes-Jackson travelled to the United States to deliver the Lowell Lectures in Boston. While there he was offered and accepted a position as Charles A. Briggs graduate professor of Christian institutions at Union Theological Seminary, New York City. He held that position until 1933, finally becoming emeritus that year. The reason for the move may be due in part to his failing to become the Regius Professor of Divinity at Cambridge, which went instead to Vincent Henry Stanton that year (1916). With the burden of college teaching removed, he was able to concentrate on his writing; thus, most of his books were published while at Union. He was a lecturer at the Jewish Institute of Religion, 1924–27, and at the General Theological Seminary, 1925–26. In 1933 he was awarded a D. Théol. from the University of Strasbourg, France, and in 1935 a Litt. D. from the University of the South. He was a fellow of the Royal Historical Society (F.R.Hist.S.), fellow of the Royal Society of Literature (F.R.L.S.), honorary correspondent of the Institut Historique et Héraldique de France, and fellow of the American Academy of Arts and Sciences.

Foakes-Jackson married Anna Maria Everett, daughter of George Grimwade Everett of Hadleigh, Suffolk, in 1895. She died in 1931. The next year he married Clara Fawcett, widow of Arthur Jackson Tomlinson of New York. There were no children from either marriage. He died in Englewood, New Jersey, 1 December 1941.

== Works ==
- History of the Christian Church from the Earliest Times to the Death of Constantine, A.D. 337 (Cambridge: J. Hall & Son, 1891). Revised many times and expanded to: History of the Christian Church from the Earliest Times to A.D. 461, 7th ed. (New York: George H. Doran, 1924).
- Christian Difficulties in the Second and Twentieth Centuries: A Study of Marcion and his Relation to Modern Thought, Hulsean Lectures 1902–1903 (Cambridge: W. Heffer, 1903).
- The Biblical History of the Hebrews (Cambridge: W. Heffer, 1903). Revised and expanded to The Biblical History of the Hebrews to the Christian Era, 4th ed. (Cambridge: W. Heffer, 1924).
- Christ in the Church (London, 1905).
- Social Life in England, 1750–1850, Lowell Lectures 1916 (New York: Macmillan, 1916).
- St. Luke and a Modern Writer: A Study in Criticism (Cambridge: W. Heffer & Sons, 1916).
- An Introduction to the History of Christianity, A.D. 590–1314 (New York: Macmillan, 1916).
- Studies in the Life of the Early Church (New York: George H. Doran, 1924).
- Anglican Church Principles (New York: Macmillan, 1924).
- The Life of Saint Paul: The Man and the Apostle (New York: Boni & Liveright, 1926).
- Peter: Prince of Apostles: A Study in the History and Tradition of Christianity (New York: George H. Doran, 1927).
- The Rise of Gentile Christianity (New York: George H. Doran, 1927).
- Josephus and the Jews: The Religion and History of the Jews as explained by Flavius Josephus (London: S.P.C.K., 1930).
- The Church in England (Cambridge: The University Press, 1931).
- Eusebius Pamphili, Bishop of Caesarea in Palestine and first Christian Historian: A Study of the Man and his Writings (Cambridge: W. Heffer, 1933).
- The Church in the Middle Ages (Cambridge: The University Press, 1934).
- A History of Church History: Studies of some Historians of the Christian Church (Cambridge: W. Heffer, 1939).

=== The Beginnings of Christianity ===
- The Beginnings of Christianity, Part I: The Acts of the Apostles, ed. F. J. Foakes-Jackson and Kirsopp Lake, 5 vols. (London: Macmillan, 1920–33).
  - Vol I. Prolegomena I: The Jewish, Gentile and Christian backgrounds (1920).
  - Vol. II. Prolegomena II: Criticism (1922).
  - Vol. III. The text of Acts (1926), by J. H. Ropes.
  - Vol. IV. English translation and commentary (1932), by Kirsopp Lake and H. J. Cadbury.
  - Vol. V. Additional notes to the commentary (1932), edited by Kirsopp Lake and H. J. Cadbury.

The massive five volume work The Beginnings of Christianity was originally conceived by Foakes-Jackson and Kirsopp Lake during conversations at the University of Leiden sometime before 1912 (vol. v, p. vii). It sought to investigate the view "that Christianity in the first century achieved a synthesis between the Greco-Oriental and the Jewish religions in the Roman Empire. The preaching of repentance, and of the Kingdom of God begun by Jesus passed into the sacramental cult of the Lord Jesus Christ. But the details are complex and obscure. What were the exact elements in this synthesis? How was it effected?" (vol. i, p. vii). The project was to be a grand endeavour. The five volumes that were ultimately published only comprise "Part I". As they explain: "Before, however, attempting to reconstruct this history we believed it necessary to study Acts in the light of the results of modern criticism. ... Later on we hope to return to the subject and reconsider the narrative of the life of Jesus, and the influence on the Church of his own teaching and of the teaching of others about him" (vol. ii, p. v). As it turned out they were never able to "return to the subject" and complete the project. In fact, Foakes-Jackson did not participate directly after the first two volumes, being essentially replaced by H. J. Cadbury. "In sum," writes Baird, "The Beginnings of Christianity is a monumental work—the most extensive investigation of a NT book by English-speaking scholarship."

Academic offices
Preceded by Edmund Henry Morgan	Dean of Jesus College, Cambridge; 1895—1916	Succeeded by Alexander Nairne
