= John de Soyres =

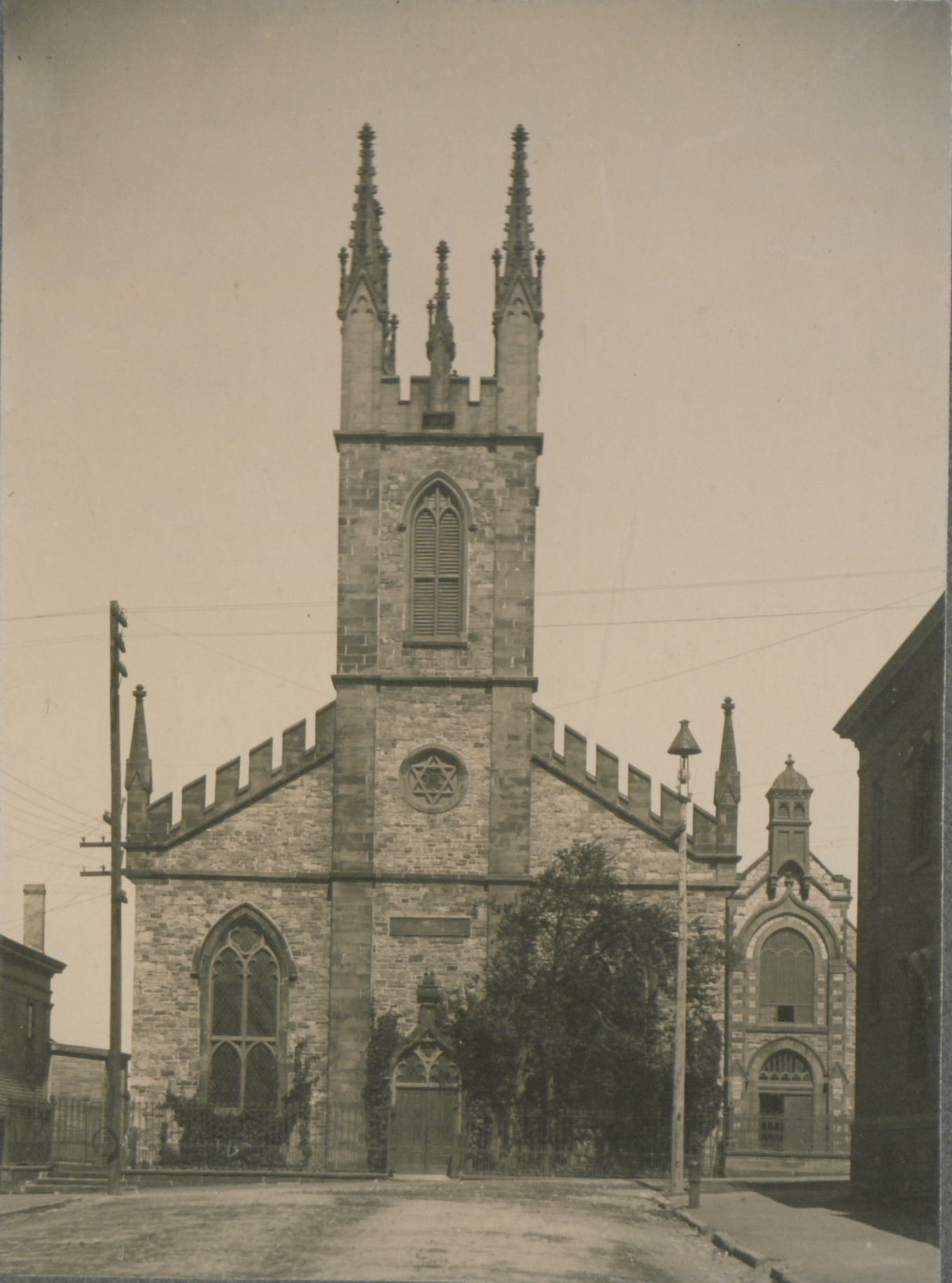
St. John Stone Church at the time de Soyres preached there (1902)

John de Soyres (April 26, 1847 – February 3, 1905) was a Protestant Reverend and scholar. He was born in the village of Bilbrook, near Old Cleeve, in Somersetshire, England, and attended Gonville and Caius College, Cambridge, where he obtained the degrees of BA and MA. In 1888 he immigrated to Saint John, New Brunswick, Canada, to assume the rectorship of the St. John (Stone) Church there."

== Works ==
- Montanism and the primitive church; a study in the ecclesiastical history of the second century, 1878
- (ed.) The provincial letters of Pascal, 1880
- The children of wisdom and other sermons preached in Canadian pulpits, 1897
- Christianity and Biblical Criticism (1890)
