= Fluff =

Fluff may refer to:

== Fiction ==
- Princess Fluff, in L. Frank Baum's Oz books Queen Zixi of Ix and The Road to Oz
- Doc and Fluff: The Dystopian Tale of a Girl and Her Biker by Patrick Califia
- Fluff, in the radio and internet series The Space Gypsy Adventures
- Fluff My Life, a storyline in the dark comedy isekai comic book I Hate Fairyland
- Louise "Fluff" Phillips, in the 1937 film Kid Galahad, played by Bette Davis
- Fluff, a kwami from Miraculous: Tales of Ladybug & Cat Noir

== Music ==
- Fluff, the third album released by the Swedish music group Atomic Swing
- "Fluff", an instrumental song on Black Sabbath's album Sabbath Bloody Sabbath
- Fluff Fest, a vegan hardcore punk festival held annually in Rokycany, Czech Republic

== Nickname ==
- Fluff Bothwell, American football player
- Mike Cowan (born 1948), golf caddy, formerly for Tiger Woods
- Alan Freeman (1927–2006), Australian-born British disc jockey and radio personality
- Jim Weaver (left-handed pitcher) (born 1939), American former Major League Baseball pitcher

== Other uses ==
- Slang for flatulence
- A lightweight file manager using the FLTK user interface library and the default file manager in Tiny Core Linux
- A popular brand of marshmallow creme

== See also ==
- Navel fluff or lint
- Fluf, an American punk rock band
- Fluffing (disambiguation)
- Fluffy (disambiguation)
