= Fluffy =

Fluffy may refer to:

== Characters ==
- Fluffy (Harry Potter), a monstrous three-headed dog in Harry Potter and the Philosopher's Stone
- Fluffy, a beast in a crate that features in a segment of the 1982 film, Creepshow
- Fluffy, a fictional cat character in the Disney comics series Darkwing Duck
- Fluffy, a one-shot character in the episode, "Puppy Love" on the Pajanimals
- Fluffy, a fictional pet elephant belonging to the character Oscar the Grouch on the TV series Sesame Street
- Fluffy, a fictional pet pig belonging to the character Eric Cartman on the TV series South Park

== Films ==
- Fluffy (1965 film), a 1965 film starring Tony Randall and Shirley Jones
- Fluffy, a 2003 short film starring Fred Ewanuick
- Fluffy (2016 film), a 2016 short film

== Music ==
- Fluffy (band), a 1990s UK punk band
- Fluffy, a 1990s band associated with the band Breakfast with Amy
- "Fluffy" (song), a 2013 song by Wolf Alice

== Other uses ==
- Fluffy, nickname for stand-up comedian Gabriel Iglesias
- Fluffy (comics), a 2003 graphic novel by Simone Lia
- Fluffy (footwear), a form of fashion accessory
- Fluffy transcription factor, a gene of the mold Neurospora crassa

== See also ==
- Fluff (disambiguation)
- F.L.U.F.F.I., a fictional robot ape belonging to the Bennett family on the TV series Bionic Six
- Fluffing (disambiguation)
