= Dalston railway station (London) =

Proposed railway station in London, England

Dalston
- Interactive map of Dalston

General information
- Location: Dalston
- Local authority: London Borough of Hackney
- Owner: Transport for London or Network Rail
- Number of platforms: 2
- Fare zone: 2

Key dates
- 2033: Opening

Other information
- Coordinates: 51.5473°N 0.0756°W

Dalston is a proposed railway station on the theoretical Crossrail 2 line in Dalston, Greater London. It would be an underground station providing interchange with the existing Dalston Kingsland and Dalston Junction stations.

== Services ==
Future Development
Preceding station	Crossrail	Following station
Angel towards Hampton Court, Shepperton, Chessington South or Epsom	Crossrail 2	Seven Sisters towards New Southgate
Angel towards Hampton Court, Shepperton, Chessington South or Epsom	Crossrail 2 Broxbourne	Tottenham Hale towards New Southgate or Broxbourne
