= Angel tube station =

London Underground station

Angel
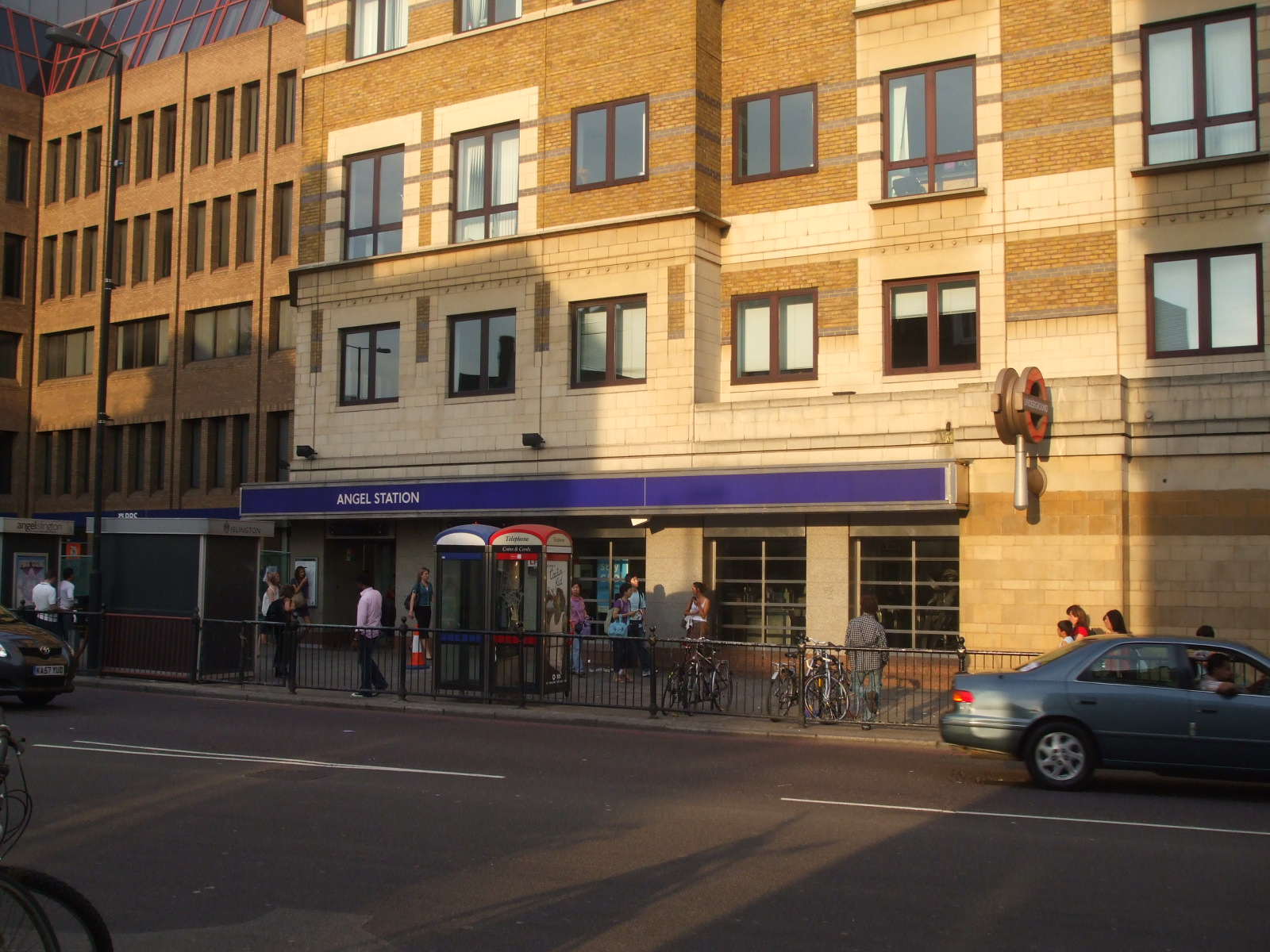
- Entrance of the post-1992 Angel station on Islington High Street. The building above has since been demolished.
- Interactive map of Angel

General information
- Location: Angel
- Local authority: London Borough of Islington
- Managed by: London Underground
- Number of platforms: 2
- Fare zone: 1

London Underground annual entry and exit
- 2021: ▲7.26 million
- 2022: ▲12.37 million
- 2023: ▼12.26 million
- 2024: ▼12.15 million
- 2025: ▼11.69 million

Key dates
- 17 November 1901: Opened
- 1990–92: Rebuilt

Other information
- External links: TfL station info page
- Coordinates: 51.532°N 0.106°W

Angel is a London Underground station, located in the Angel area of the London Borough of Islington. It is on the Bank branch of the Northern line, between King's Cross St. Pancras and Old Street stations. The station is in London fare zone 1. It was originally built by the City & South London Railway (C&SLR) and opened on 17 November 1901. The station served as a terminus until the line was extended to Euston on 12 May 1907.

Angel was rebuilt between 1989 and 1992 to accommodate the large number of passengers using the station. As a result, it has an extra-wide southbound platform, surfaced over the original island platform which served both north- and south-bound trains. The station has the longest escalators on the Underground network.

== History ==
Angel station was originally built by the City & South London Railway (C&SLR), and opened on 17 November 1901 (Note: Angel is one of the five stations on the London Underground named after a public house – in this case the once-famous Angel inn, which dates back to at least 1638. The others are Elephant & Castle, Manor House, Royal Oak and Swiss Cottage.) as the northern terminus of a new extension from Moorgate. The station building was designed by Sydney Smith and was on the corner of City Road and Torrens Street. On 12 May 1907, the C&SLR opened a further extension from Angel to Euston and Angel became a through station.

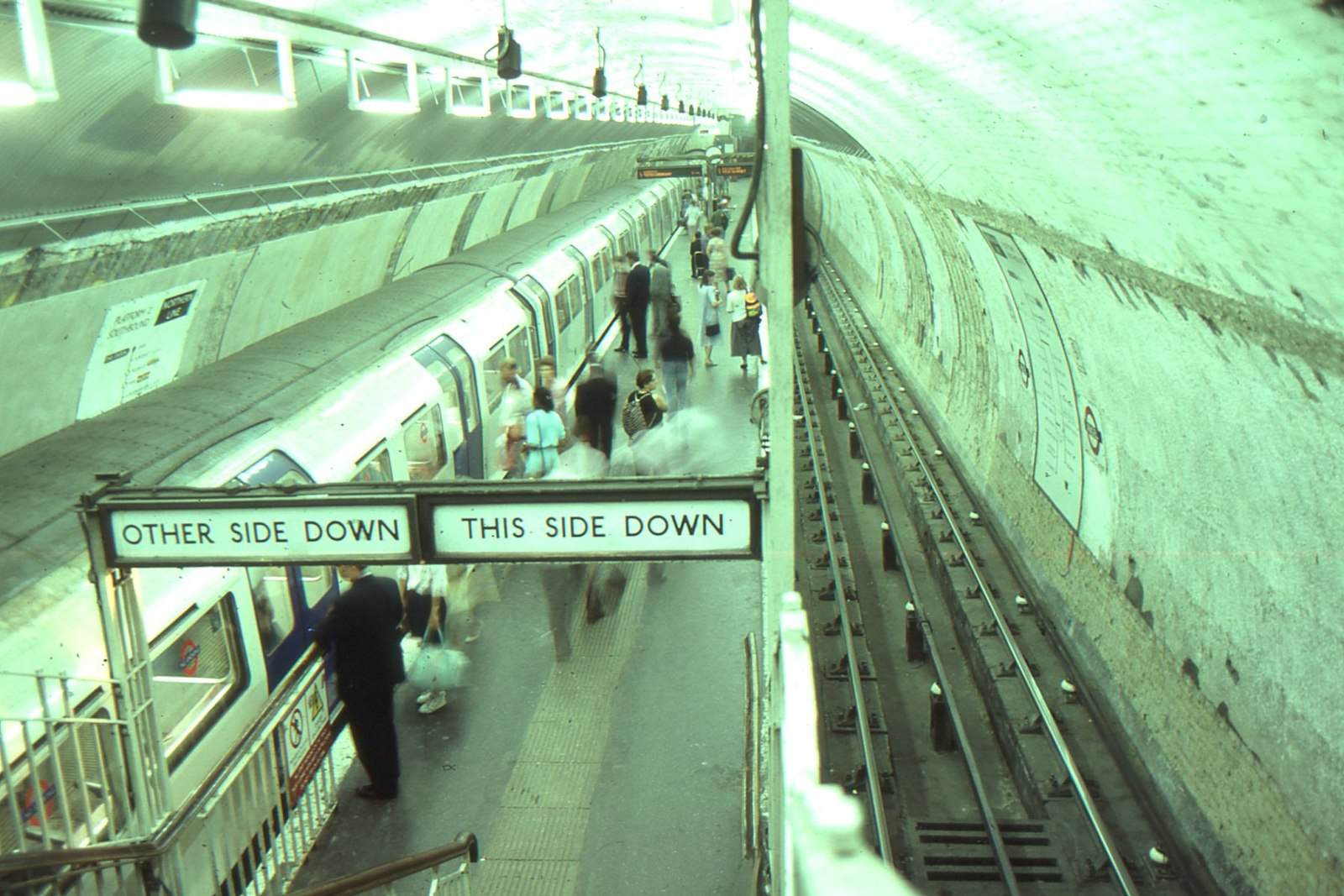
The island platform before rebuilding

As with many of the C&SLR's stations, it was originally built with a single central island platform serving two tracks in a single tunnel – an arrangement still seen at Clapham North and Clapham Common. Access to the platforms from street level was via three Euston Anderson electric lifts before the rebuilding of the station. When the C&SLR line was closed for tunnel reconstruction in the early 1920s to accommodate larger trains, the station façade was reclad with tiling and the lifts were replaced by new ones from Otis.

=== Station rebuilding ===
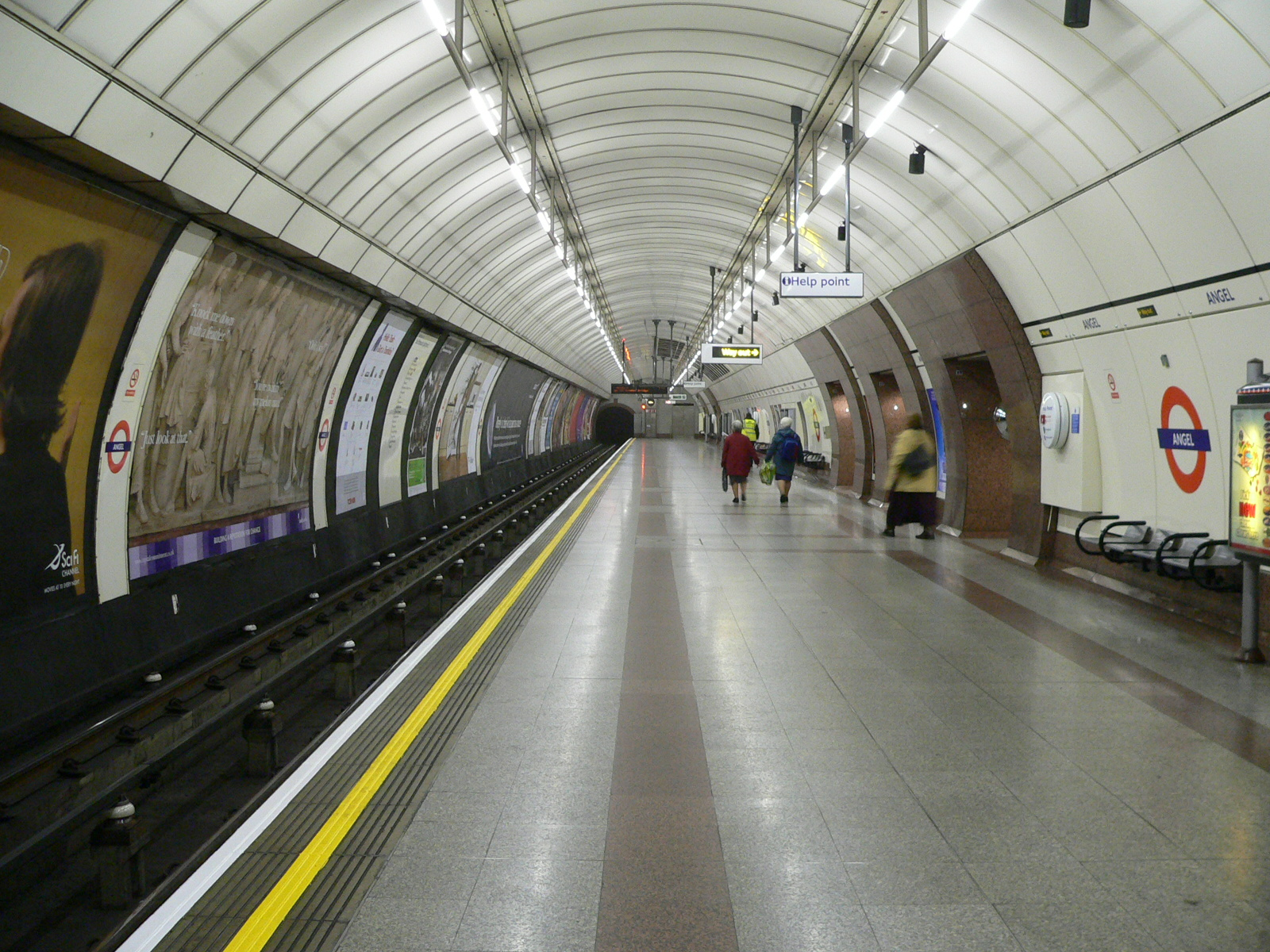
The extra-wide Northern line southbound platform occupies the whole of the original station tunnel.

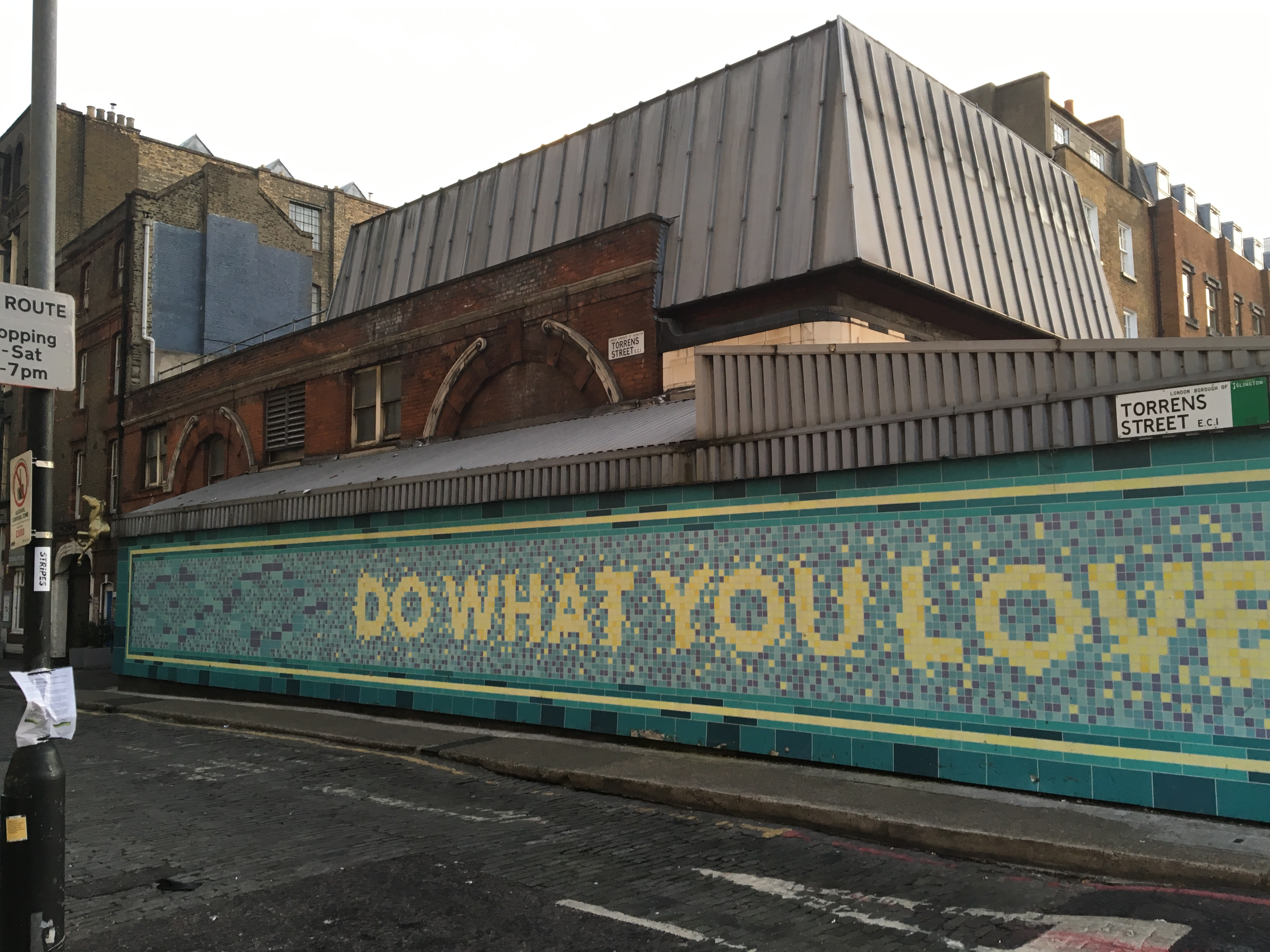
The original surface building of Angel station in Torrens Street

For years since its opening, the station regularly suffered from overcrowding and had a very narrow island platform (12 feet (3.7 m) in width), which was considered a major safety issue and caused justified fear among passengers. Consequently, the station was rebuilt between 1989 and 1992. A new section of tunnel was excavated for a new northbound platform, and the southbound platform was rebuilt to occupy the entire width of the original 30-foot (9 m) tunnel, leaving it wider than most deep-level platforms on the system. (Note: This rebuilding technique was also applied on Euston's Bank branch platforms.) The lifts and the original surface building at the corner of Torrens Street and City Road were closed, while the escalator shafts of the remodelled station were constructed in conjunction with the Angel Square office complex, the ground floor of which included the ticket hall and relocated entrance on Islington High Street. It opened on 10 August 1992, along with the new northbound platform; the enlarged southbound platform opened on 17 September 1992. Because of the distance between the new entrance and the platforms, and their depth, two flights of escalators were required, aligned approximately at a right angle. The old station building, although now closed to the public, houses ventilation systems and other services for the platforms below.

=== Former siding ===
When Angel was first opened, a long dead-end siding was provided for train stabling, converging from the left onto the northbound line just south of the station. This was retained over the years but eventually it was closed on 23 January 1959 (along with the signal box at the south end of the platform) to simplify through running. The siding lay derelict and unused until the rebuilding scheme. Part of the siding was used as the northbound diversion tunnel, which branched off the existing northbound line, cut through into the end of the siding and continued along it until it branched off left to the new northbound platform. (Note: This disused junction of tunnels still survives between the two running lines.)

== Design ==
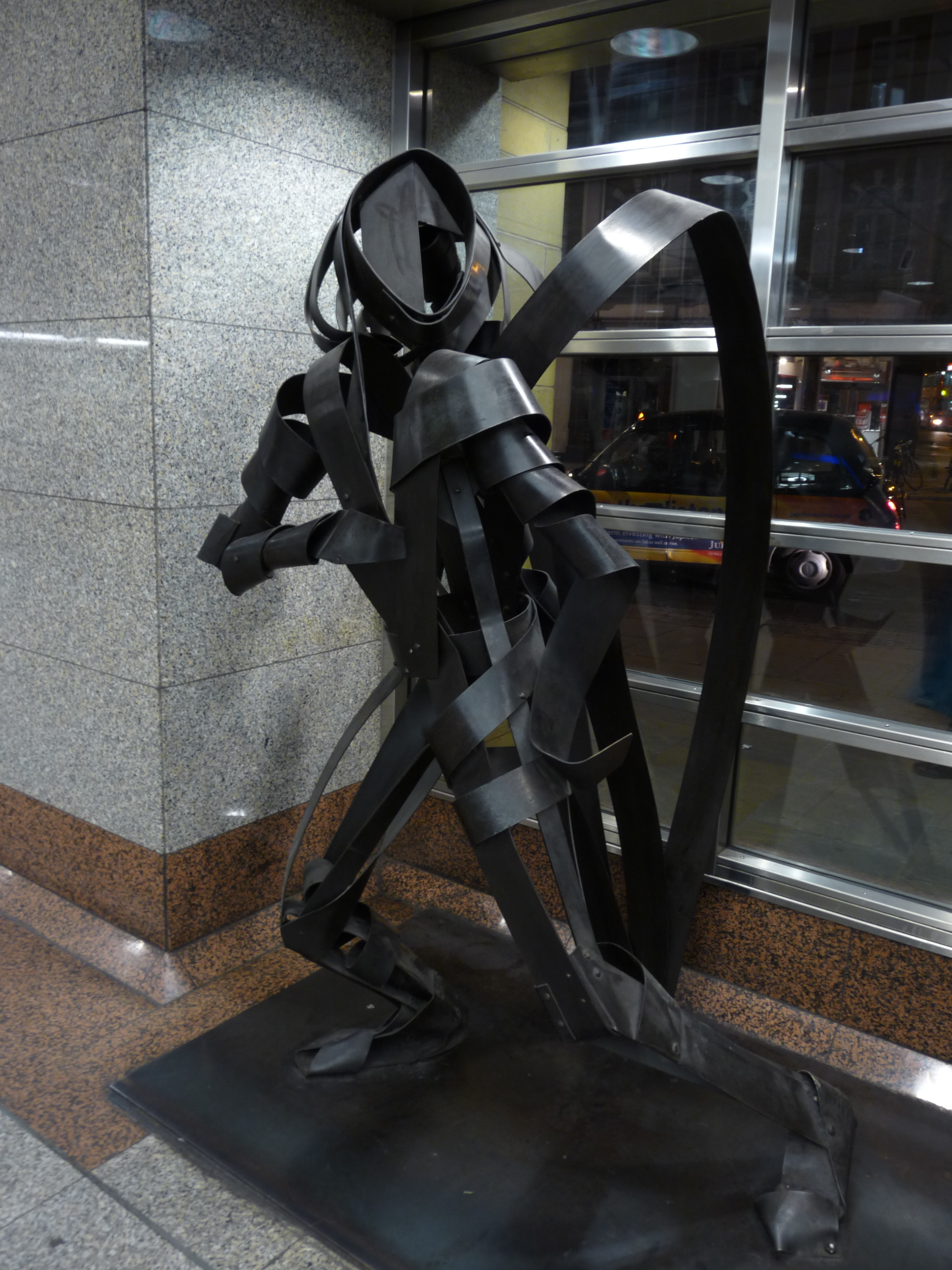
The sculpture in the ticket hall

The station's ticket hall has a sculpture of an angel made by Kevin Boys Blacksmiths in 1996.

=== Escalators ===
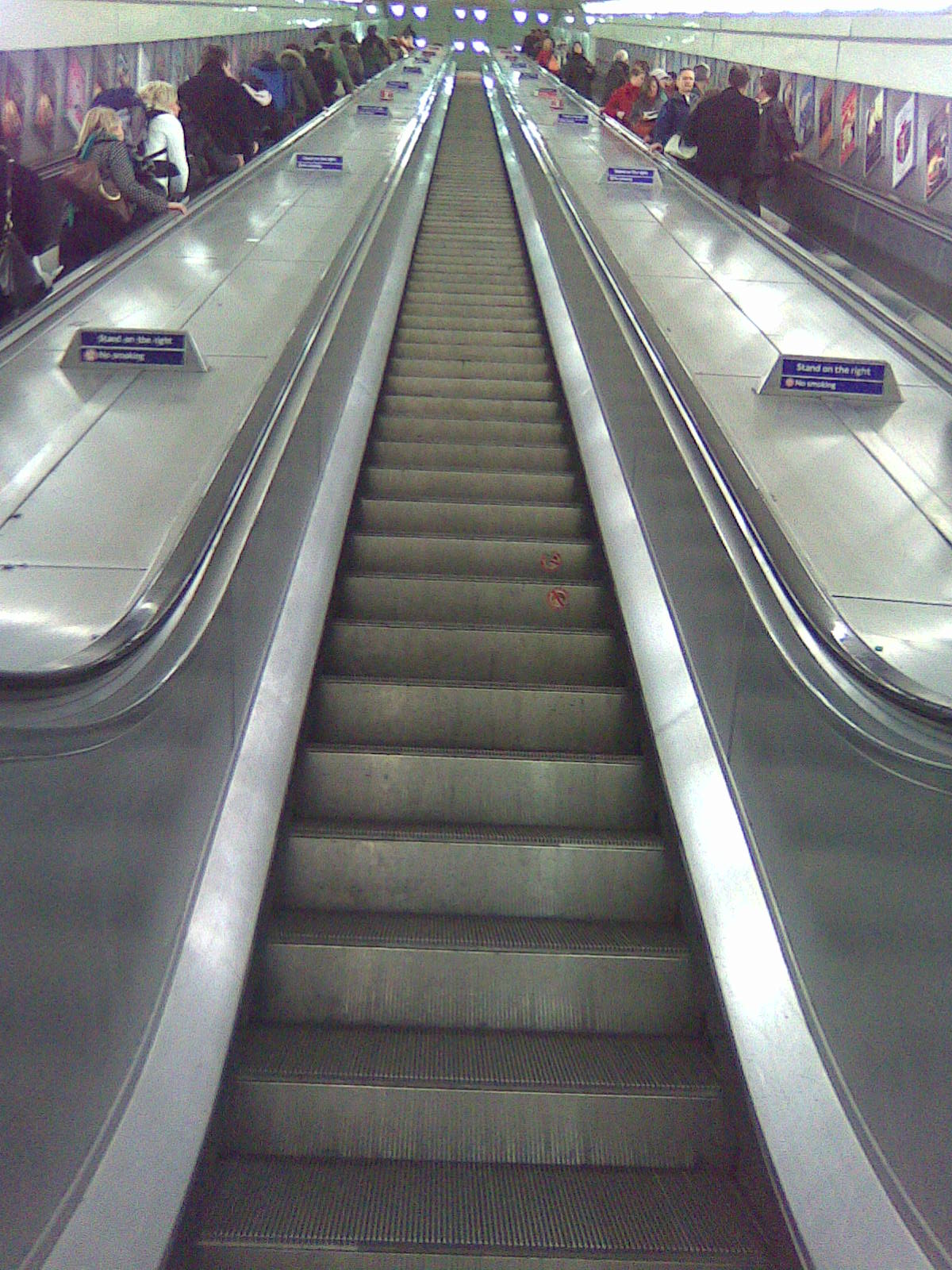
The longest escalators on the Underground

Angel is one of fourteen stations to have only escalator access to the platforms. With a vertical rise of 90 ft (27 m) and a length of 200 ft (61 m), the escalators at Angel station are the longest on the Underground, and in the United Kingdom.

=== 2007 improvements ===
The station was refurbished during 2007. Additional CCTV cameras and Help Points were installed, bringing the total to 77 cameras in the station and nine Help Points, the latter upgraded with new induction loops to better aid hearing-impaired passengers. In addition, new communications equipment was introduced and damaged signs were replaced.

=== Overstation building ===
In September 2022, planning approval was granted to reconstruct the Angel Square office complex which also incorporates the station's surface entrance. The scheme involves stripping the building back to its concrete frame, adding two new storeys and replacing the original brick and stone façade with a glass curtain wall. The plans triggered much objection from conservation groups such as Save Britain's Heritage, who argued that it was a significant example of post-war architecture. The works resulted in the partial closure of the station entrances which will be upgraded as part of the rebuild.

== Location ==
On Islington High Street, the station provides access to several nearby Off West End or Fringe theatre venues including the Old Red Lion Theatre, Sadler's Wells Theatre, the King's Head Theatre and the Almeida Theatre. It is the nearest station to City University's main campus, Chapel Market, and the antiques market and dealers of Camden Passage. Between Angel and Old Street is the disused City Road station.

Several London Buses routes serve the station, with a number of them running through the night.

== Services ==
Angel station is on the Bank or City branch of the Northern line in London fare zone 1. It is between King's Cross St Pancras to the north and Old Street to the south. Train frequencies vary throughout the day, but generally operate every 3–6 minutes between 05:50 and 00:40 in both directions.

Preceding station	London Underground	Following station
King's Cross St Pancras towards Edgware, Mill Hill East or High Barnet	Northern line Bank branch	Old Street towards Morden
Former route (1901–1922)
Preceding station	London Underground	Following station
King's Cross St Pancras towards Edgware, Mill Hill East or High Barnet	Northern line Bank Branch	City Road towards Morden
Future Development
Preceding station	Crossrail	Following station
Euston St Pancras towards Hampton Court, Shepperton, Chessington South or Epsom	Crossrail 2	Dalston towards New Southgate or Broxbourne

== Future proposals ==
Angel was a proposed station on the now-shelved Crossrail 2 (Chelsea-Hackney line) project, providing an interchange between Crossrail 2 and the Northern line. Depending on the route constructed, it would be between King's Cross St. Pancras and Dalston Junction or Hackney Central. It was officially safeguarded as part of the route in 2007, although there had been proposals for a route for some time previously and safeguarding had been in place since 1991. The Crossrail 2 project was shelved in November 2020.

== In media ==
The station's escalators and the southbound platform were featured in the Bollywood hit film Dilwale Dulhania Le Jayenge.

The station was the subject of a 1989 episode of the 40 Minutes BBC documentary series titled "Heart of the Angel". The programme depicted everyday life in the station just a few months before its closure for rebuilding. The programme depicted the staff's daily struggles with overcrowding, frequent lift breakdowns and dealing with constant complaints from passengers. The interiors of the original station building and the old island platform are clearly shown in the footage, as is the construction site of the adjacent Angel Square development which would incorporate the new station's escalator shafts and ticket hall.
