= Heart of the Angel =

1989 British documentary

The Heart of the Angel is a documentary made by director/producer Molly Dineen in 1989, before the 1992 renovation of the then 100-year-old Angel tube station on the London Underground. It was first screened in BBC2's 40 Minutes series on 23 November 1989. At the time of the documentary's release, Angel was one of the most dilapidated and overcrowded stations on the Tube, being the last remaining Central London station that still used an island platform configuration and lifts to reach the platforms from street level.

The film follows 48 hours in the everyday lives of the people who work in the station, including London Underground foreman Ray Stocker, ticket-seller Derek Perkins, the groups of women called 'fluffers' who clean human hair out of the tracks to avoid the fire hazard, and the gangs of men who work with pickaxes in almost pitch-black conditions to renovate parts of the track in time for the following day.

Depicted in the film were the staff's daily struggles with lift breakdowns, overcrowding and disgruntled passengers, in what were the station's final months before it was closed for two years for rebuilding works. In the film, Stocker and his staff are shown the plans for the new station and the construction site of the adjacent Angel Square office complex (which would incorporate the new escalator shafts, ticket hall and entrance for the expanded station) is clearly visible in several establishing shots.

This documentary was given the Documentary Award by the Royal Television Society, and is included in the first volume of The Molly Dineen Collection, released by the British Film Institute in 2011.
