= City Road =

Street in London

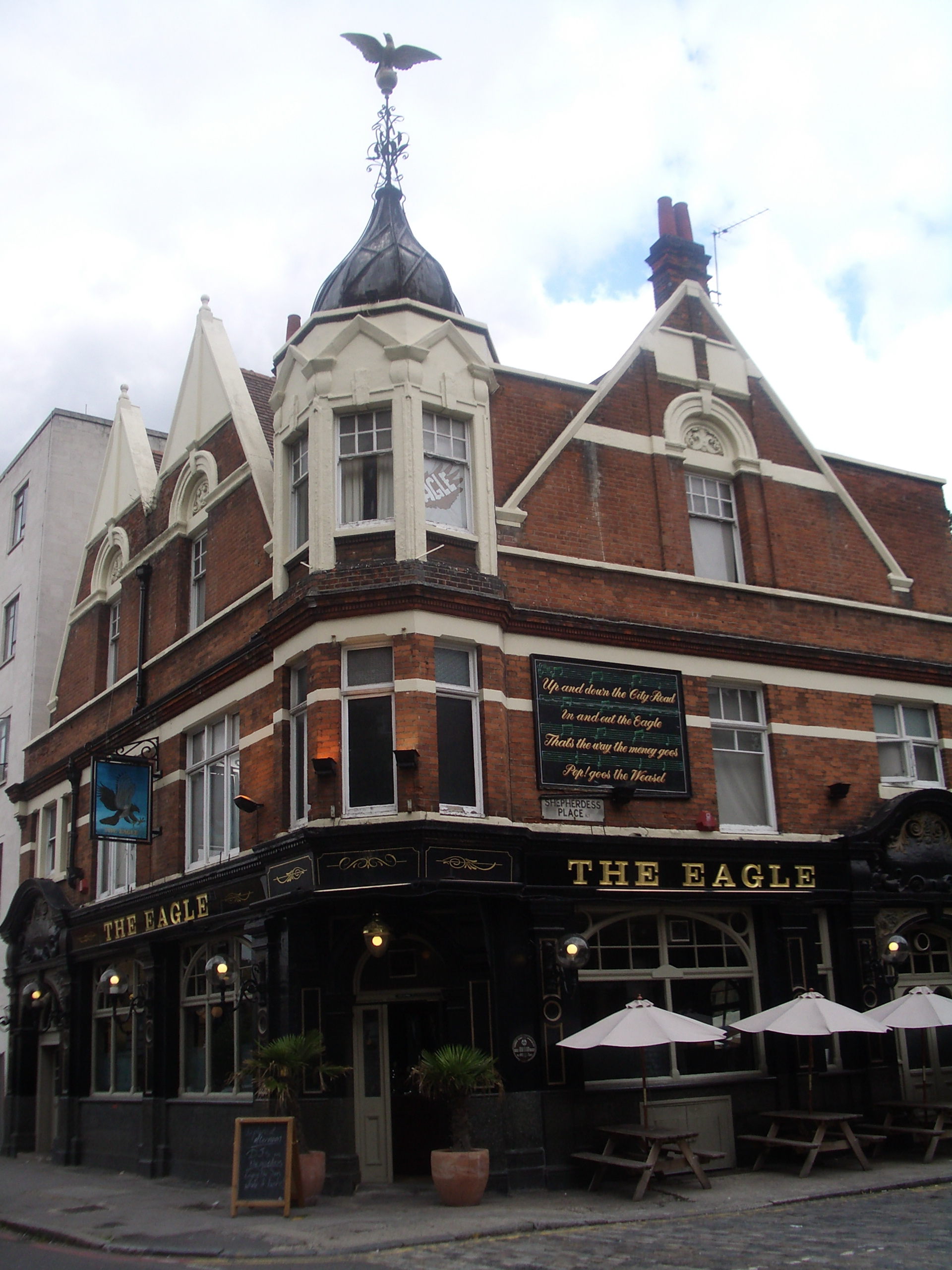
- The Eagle pub on the City Road, mentioned in the nursery rhyme Pop Goes the Weasel.

- Location within London Borough of Islington
- Maintained by: London Borough of Islington
- Location: London, United Kingdom
- Coordinates: 51°31′48″N 0°05′57″W

City Road or The City Road is a road that runs through central London. The northwestern extremity of the road is at Angel where it forms a continuation of Pentonville Road. Pentonville Road itself is the modern name for the eastern part of London's first bypass, the New Road from Paddington to Islington, which was constructed in 1756. The City Road was built in 1761 as a continuation of that route to the City of London.

== Route ==
From Angel, City Road runs roughly south-east and downhill past the City Road Basin of Regent's Canal and Moorfields Eye Hospital, after which it bears closer to south, and has a junction with Old Street at the former Old Street Roundabout. After Old Street, it continues south, continuing past Bunhill Fields, Wesley's Chapel and the Honourable Artillery Company, after which the road continues south as Finsbury Square, then Finsbury Pavement, then Moorgate—the latter beginning at the border with the City of London. These roads form a major entry point into the City of London, and were extended in 1846 through the City itself (as Princes Street and King William Street) to connect with London Bridge.

A map showing the City Road wards of Finsbury Metropolitan Borough as they appeared in 1952.

The part of the road north of Old Street is on the London Inner Ring Road and as such forms part of the boundary of the London congestion charge zone. The ring road continues east along Old Street. Most of the road is in the London Borough of Islington, although the stretch from Wharf Road down to Old Street is the border between Islington and Hackney, so the two sides are in different boroughs.

== Transport links ==
Nearby London Underground stations are Angel, Old Street and Moorgate. The disused City Road station was on City Road itself.

London Bus routes serving the length of City Road include 43, 205, 214, 394.

== Cultural references ==
The City Road and The Eagle tavern are mentioned in an additional verse written for the nursery rhyme Pop Goes the Weasel by 1856, when it was quoted in a performance at the Theatre Royal:

Up and down the City Road
In and out the Eagle
That's the way the money goes
Pop! goes the weasel.

The Eagle was a well-known public house on City Road, which was rebuilt as a music hall on 1825, was later renamed the Grecian Theatre, became a Salvation Army centre in 1884, and was demolished in 1901. Its site is now occupied by Eagle Dwellings, a housing complex administered by the Peabody Trust. A replacement Eagle pub, opened in 1901, was erected in Shepherdess Walk, on the opposite (north-east) side of City Road: this still stands, and the rhyme is painted on a plaque on its façade.

== See also ==
- Honourable Artillery Company Museum
