= City Road tube station =

London Underground station, 1901–1922

City Road
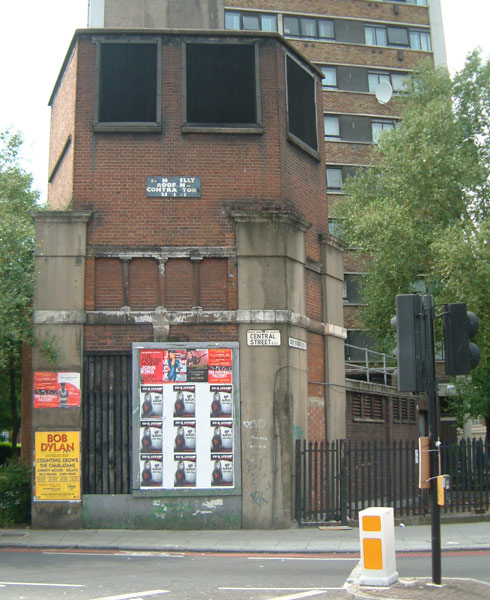
- The station remains in 2004
- Interactive map of City Road

General information
- Location: City Road
- Local authority: Islington
- Owner: City & South London Railway
- Number of platforms: 2

Key dates
- 17 November 1901: Opened
- 8 August 1922: Closed

Other information
- Coordinates: 51°31′47″N 0°05′51″W

City Road is a disused London Underground station in Islington, central London. It was opened in 1901 as part of the City & South London Railway's extension from Moorgate Street to Angel. The station was located on the City Road between Old Street and Angel stations. The railway is now part of the Northern line.

The station was closed in 1922 due to low passenger usage. The underground tunnels remain at track level, but the station remained derelict until the 1960s, when it was demolished except for the structure around the original lift shaft. This remained at City Road's junction with Central Street and Moreland Street until the late 2010s, when it was replaced by the Bunhill 2 Energy Centre.

== History ==
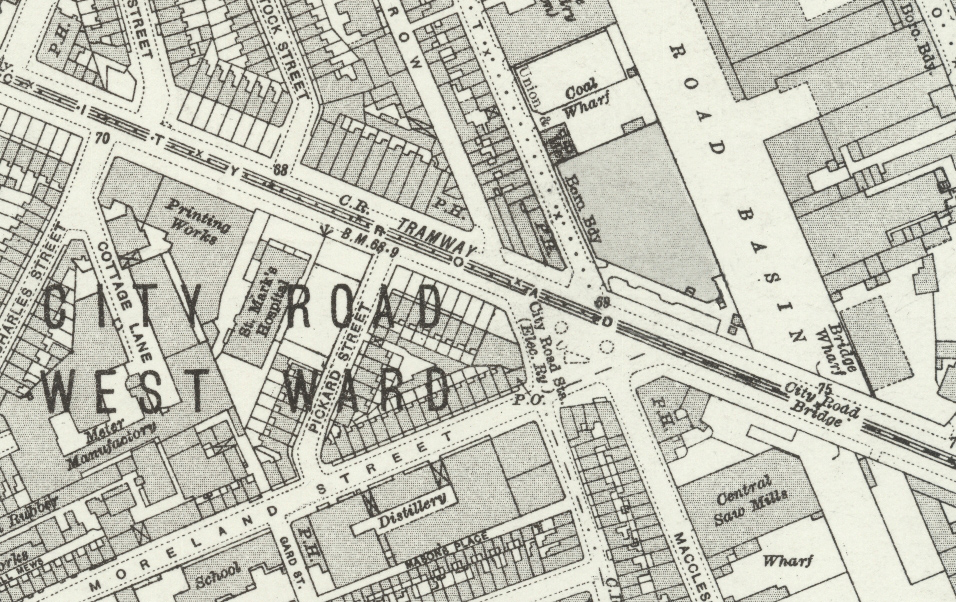
City Road station on a 1916 map

From the start, City Road station was little used, and discussions of its closure were held as early as 1908: less than seven years after it was opened. The station was close to both Old Street and Angel, and was in a deprived area of Islington. However, City Road remained until 8 August 1922 when the City & South London Railway's northern section between Euston and Moorgate Street was closed to enable the diameter of the tunnels to be increased from 10 ft 6 in (3.20 m) to the Underground's standard diameter of 11 ft 8 1/4 in (3.56 m), so that larger and longer Standard Stock trains could be operated.

Low passenger usage meant that the required expansion of the platform tunnels and upgrading of the station could not be justified on financial grounds, and City Road remained closed when the line was reopened on 20 April 1924. The platforms were removed and the lift shaft was converted for use as a ventilation shaft. City Road was the only twin tunnel station on the line not to be reconstructed. During the Second World War the station was converted for use as an air-raid shelter.

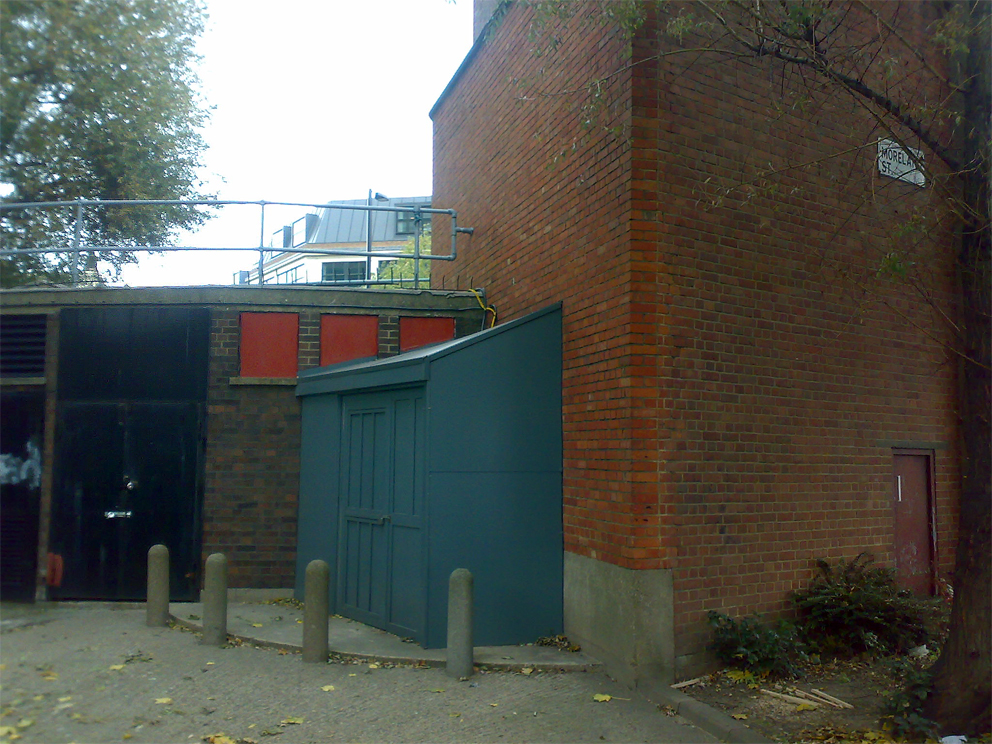
The rear entrance to the remains of City Road tube station

The station building remained until the 1960s, when all but the structure immediately around the original lift shaft was demolished. At track level the temporary structures for the air-raid shelter were removed after the war and the site of the platforms can be seen from passing trains.

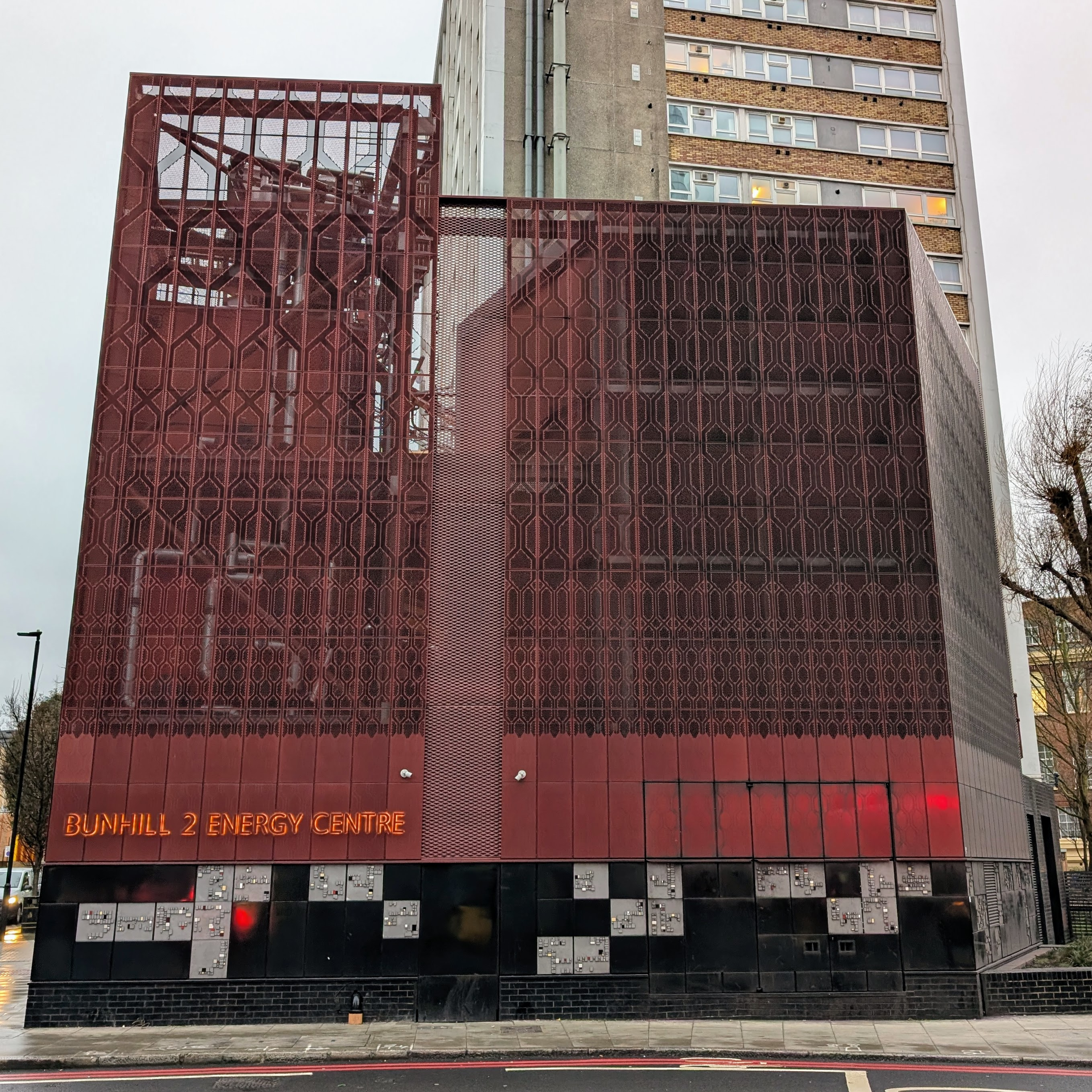
The Bunhill 2 Energy Centre which replaced the remaining station structure

Planning permission was granted in 2015 to demolish the remaining station structure for phase 2 of Islington Borough Council's scheme to heat the nearby King Square council estate. The Bunhill 2 Energy Centre opened on the site in 2020, capturing waste heat from the Northern Line tunnels to provide heat to additional residential buildings and a school.

Former route
| Preceding station | London Underground | Following station |
|---|---|---|
| Angel towards Euston | Northern line (1901-22) | Old Street towards Clapham Common |

== Accidents ==
On 26 August 1916 a passenger was killed when a guard signalled for a train to depart before all of the passengers had alighted.
