= Old Street Roundabout =

London interchange system

Coordinates: 51.5257°N 0.0875°W

Old Street Junction, after the roundabout was removed

Old Street Roundabout is a road junction in Central London, England. Historically a square roundabout, since 2020 it is a three-way junction. It is among access points of the Inner Ring Road for the adjoining St Luke's south part of Islington and the City of London beyond, west and south, respectively. It is roughly on the western limit of Hoxton in the London Borough of Hackney which straddles both sides of the Ring Road, a road which after taking up a little of the eastern part of Old Street then veers south-east, taking Great Eastern Street, at Apex Junction.

It is sometimes known as St. Agnes Well after the shopping centre beneath it, while the moniker of Silicon Roundabout owes to the surrounding East London Tech City. Old Street station, on the Northern and Northern City rail lines, is accessed from the junction centre. Transport for London (TfL) and Morgan Sindall pedestrianised the north-west section between 2019 and 2020, partially in response to cyclist injuries over the prior decade.

== Connections ==
City Road crosses the roundabout, running south towards the City of London (particularly Moorgate and Liverpool Street stations), and north-west towards Angel, Pentonville, and the two northward railway terminus districts: King's Cross/St. Pancras and Euston.

The main, namely north-east side, the north-western continuation of City Road, and Great Eastern Street are the limit the congestion charge zone (CCZ).

To the west of Old Street are Clerkenwell, Finsbury, and (further afield) the West End. To the east are Shoreditch and London's East End.

== St. Agnes Well ==
The shopping complex serving the broad underpass at the centre of the roundabout is named St. Agnes Well, after an ancient well thought to have been about 200 metres (660 ft) to the east, at the junction of Old Street and Great Eastern Street. Remnants of the well can be found within Old Street station.

== Old Street station ==
Old Street Station

Old Street station is below Old Street Roundabout. It is served by the Bank branch of the London Underground Northern line and by National Rail Great Northern trains. With the increase in passenger numbers using the station, in 2014 Transport for London announced that it was to offer pop-up retail space at Old Street station as part of a drive to increase its revenue.

== Silicon Roundabout ==
The term Silicon Roundabout refers to the high number of web businesses near the Old Street Roundabout (also in East London), by analogy to Silicon Valley in California.

== Collisions involving cyclists ==
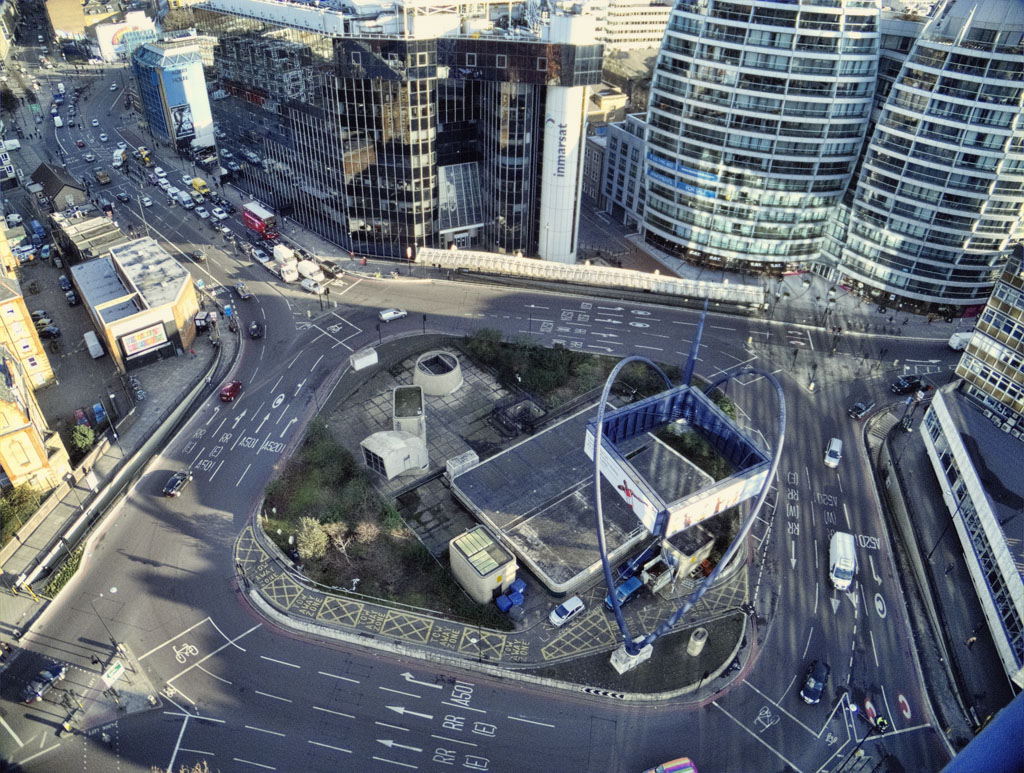
Old Street Roundabout in 2012, prior to its reconfiguration between 2020 and 2024.

A number of collisions involving cyclists have occurred at Old Street roundabout. According to the London Cycling Campaign, the junction is among the top three in London for collisions involving cyclists. Within a few days in February 2011 two cyclists were severely injured in collisions involving lorries on or very close to the roundabout.

In another collision involving a lorry in 2008, a cyclist suffered severe leg injuries, which the police described as "potentially life-changing". In response to this Transport for London proposed a massive transformation of the roundabout, into a pedestrian square with segregated cycle lanes and road signals. On 25 July 2018, a cyclist was severely injured on Old Street roundabout following a collision with a lorry.

== Reconfiguration ==
After extensive public consultation held in 2014–15, plans to broaden the non-motor vehicle area began in 2018. In 2019, the work began by Transport for London (TfL) in conjunction with Morgan Sindall. and the Boroughs of Islington and Hackney to create a much more pedestrian- and cycle-friendly zone. Remaining motor traffic is two-way to speed up pedestrian crossings and allow segregated cycle lanes. The work created a well-lit pedestrianised space around the new station main entrance.
