= Old Street station =

London Underground and railway station

Old Street
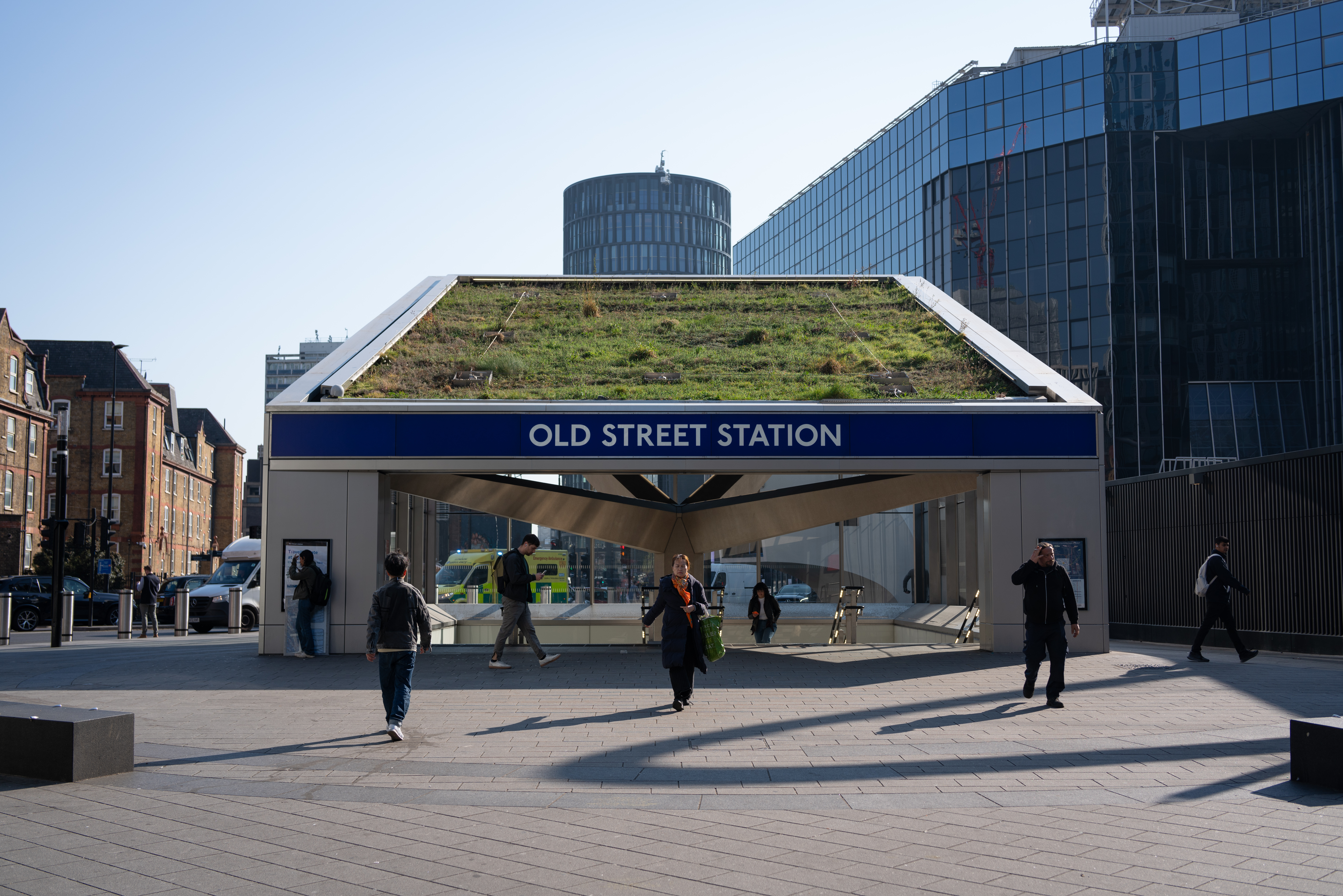
- View of the station entrance from the west
- Interactive map of Old Street

General information
- Location: St Luke's
- Local authority: Islington
- Managed by: London Underground
- Station code: OLD
- DfT category: E
- Number of platforms: 4
- Fare zone: 1

London Underground annual entry and exit
- 2020: ▼6.68 million
- 2021: ▲9.64 million
- 2022: ▲16.18 million
- 2023: ▼15.85 million
- 2024: ▲16.54 million

National Rail annual entry and exit
- 2020–21: ▼2.231 million
- 2021–22: ▲3.673 million
- 2022–23: ▲5.437 million
- 2023–24: ▲6.381 million
- 2024–25: ▼6.077 million

Key dates
- 17 November 1901: Opened (C&SLR)
- 14 February 1904: Started (GN&CR)
- 1968: Redeveloped
- 2014: Redeveloped

Other information
- External links: TfL station info page; Departures; Facilities
- Coordinates: 51.5258°N 0.0871°W

Old Street is an interchange station in London, located at the junction of Old Street and City Road for London Underground and National Rail services.

The London Underground station is on the Bank branch of the Northern line, between Angel and Moorgate stations. The National Rail station is on the Northern City Line, between Moorgate and Essex Road stations. The station is in the London Borough of Islington (straddling the Hackney border). It is in London fare zone 1.

The station was built by the City and South London Railway and opened in 1901. It was rebuilt by Stanley Heaps in 1925 with a more uniform frontage, and again in 1968, replacing all surface buildings with a subsurface complex. In 2014, it was redeveloped to provide more retail space. Old Street station has become busier, attracting over 20 million visitors in 2014; a trend expected to continue following redevelopment of the local area as a centre for the British Information Technology industry.

== Location ==
Old Street station is in the London Borough of Islington, close to the boundary with the London Borough of Hackney to the north-east. It is in the centre of, and underneath the Old Street Roundabout, a major intersection on the London Inner Ring Road which is partly in Islington's Bunhill ward and partly in Hackney's Hoxton ward.

There is no street-level station building. Access to the platform is provided by ramps and stairs to a modern entrance adjacent to a sub-surface shopping parade, known as St Agnes Well. Expanding its catchment, on the Northern line between Old Street and Angel is a disused station named City Road. (Note: City Road station closed on 8 August 1922 when the C&SLR was closed for the tunnels to be enlarged. It was not reopened and the final remaining part of the surface building was demolished in 2017.)

The station is on the National Rail network's Northern City Line, 45 chains (900 m) down-line from Moorgate served by Great Northern trains. Although a through-station on this route, for ticketing purposes Old Street is considered a central London terminus. On the Underground, it is on the Bank (eastern) branch of the Northern line, between Moorgate and Angel, in London fare zone 1.

== History ==
=== City and South London Railway ===
Old Street station in the 1920s, before redevelopment and construction of the Old Street Roundabout

The station was opened on 17 November 1901 as an extension of the City and South London Railway (C&SLR), the first deep-level tube railway in London that connected the City of London with Southwark. It was part of an extension from Moorgate to Angel, along with the station at City Road. (Note: Having learnt that the original 10-foot-2-inch (3.10 m) diameter of its tunnels was too small, the C&SLR extension was constructed to a 11-foot-6-inch (3.51 m) diameter.) The area around the station was originally a mix of light industry, commerce and warehouses.

The Northern City Line platforms were opened on 14 February 1904 by the Great Northern & City Railway, which built its tunnels to a 16-foot (4.9 m) diameter capable of accommodating main-line trains as it was intended to carry such services from its northern terminus at the Great Northern Railway's Finsbury Park station to Moorgate. (Note: The two companies fell out before the construction of the new line was completed and the connection at Finsbury Park was not constructed.) Before Moorgate was expanded in 1938 to include in-station escalators between platforms, Old Street was used as the main interchange between the C&SLR and the Northern City lines. The Finsbury Park connection eventually opened in November 1976, with the line becoming a British Rail route, with through services to Hertford North and Welwyn Garden City.

The C&SLR was built with smaller tunnels than the later tube lines and needed to be enlarged to enable them to accommodate standard stock trains. The section between Euston and Moorgate closed on 8 August 1922 and reopened on 20 April 1924. The surface building was rebuilt in 1925 when escalators replaced the lift shaft to access the platform tunnels. The station frontage was redesigned by the Underground Electric Railways Company of London's architect Stanley Heaps with consultant architect Charles Holden. Holden had been recommended by managing director Frank Pick to make uniform facades for several station entrances. He designed the stations for the C&SLR's extension to Morden which was being built.

Old Street was used as a bomb shelter during World War II; the nearby City Road station (which had closed in 1922) was temporarily re-opened to use as a shelter.

=== Reconstruction ===
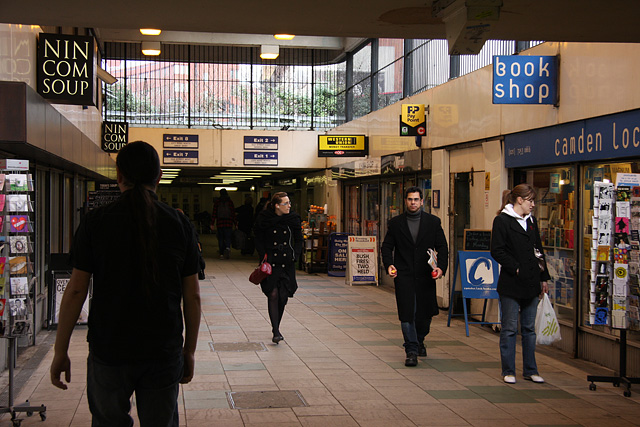
A group of shops in the Old Street station complex

In 1968, the station was again modified; the surface building was replaced with a sub-surface structure in the centre of the roundabout and another escalator shaft was added. During the 1990s corrosion caused by excessive soil acidity required a section of the cast iron running tunnel lining in the Northern line, south of Old Street, to be relined with stainless steel tunnel segments.

In the early 1970s, Old Street was planned to be a stop on a new tube line from Wimbledon in the southwest to Leytonstone in the northeast, via Waterloo and Holborn. The route incorporated parts of existing lines at each end but was not built because of a lack of funding.

In 2014 the station was redeveloped in a collaboration between Transport for London and letting agency Appear Here. Pop-up retail spaces were constructed around the station entrance in a drive to increase revenue.

Old Street station has had increased footfall in the 21st century. In 2014, around 23 million people passed through the station annually. The station is considered strategically important, as the area around Old Street is being developed as a centre for Information Technology. In 2017, the London Borough of Islington announced plans to redevelop the area around the station with a new entrance and better facilities for cyclists.

== Incidents ==
On 16 August 1921, a man fell onto the track and was killed. He was identified by a card containing personal details in his pocket.

On 25 March 1970, an escalator at the station broke down during the morning rush hour. Six people were taken to hospital for minor injuries after they fell.

In March 2015, a man was struck and killed by a train. An inquiry returned a verdict of accidental death. Two significant incidents occurred in 2017. In May, the station was closed after a body was found in the station complex. On 30 September, the station was evacuated after passengers heard a loud "bang". Around 20 ambulances and numerous police officers attended the scene, believing it to be a potential terrorist incident. A search around the station found nothing suspicious.

== Services ==
The station has four platforms. Platforms 1–2 serve the Northern line on the London Underground network, while platforms 3–4 serve the Northern City Line on the National Rail network. Both are deep-level tube lines. The station is part of the London station group and acts as a final destination for people travelling with National Rail tickets marked "London Terminals".

Late evening and weekend services were introduced at the National Rail station, as part of the Great Northern Thameslink franchise in 2015.

Services at the station are as follows.

=== National Rail ===
National Rail services at Old Street are operated by Great Northern using Class 717 EMUs.

The typical off-peak service in trains per hour is:

- 4 tph to Moorgate
- 2 tph to Stevenage via Hertford North
- 2 tph to Welwyn Garden City

During the peak hours, the station is served by an additional half-hourly service between Moorgate and Hertford North and the service between Moorgate and Welwyn Garden City is increased to 4 tph.

=== London Underground ===
London Underground services at Old Street are served by the Northern line. The typical off-peak service in trains per hour, is:

- 20 tph to Morden
- 10 tph to Edgware
- 8 tph to High Barnet
- 2 tph to Mill Hill East

During the peak hours, the service is increased up to 22 tph in each direction.

Preceding station	London Underground	Following station
Angel towards Edgware, Mill Hill East or High Barnet	Northern line Bank branch	Moorgate towards Morden
Preceding station	National Rail	Following station
Essex Road	Great Northern Northern City Line	Moorgate
Former service
Preceding station	London Underground	Following station
City Road towards Euston	Northern line (1901–22)	Moorgate towards Clapham Common
Essex Road towards Finsbury Park	Metropolitan line Northern City Branch (1913–39)	Moorgate Terminus
Essex Road towards Finsbury Park	Northern line Northern City Branch (1939–64)	Moorgate Terminus
Essex Road towards Drayton Park	Northern line Northern City Branch (1964–75)	Moorgate Terminus
Abandoned plans
Preceding station	London Underground	Following station
Essex Road towards Bushey Heath, High Barnet or Alexandra Palace	Northern line	Moorgate Terminus

== Connections ==
London Buses routes 21, 43, 55, 76, 135, 141, 205, 214, 243 and night routes N55, N205 and N263 serve the station.

== Cultural references ==
The graffiti artist Banksy painted a Pulp Fiction mural near Old Street station in 2002. It was based on Vincent Vega and Jules Winnfield from the film of the same name, except the characters held bananas in place of guns. It was accidentally painted over in 2007. A Transport for London representative said "Our graffiti removal teams are staffed by professional cleaners, not professional art critics".
