= Old Street =

Street in central and east London, England

Coordinates: 51°31′36″N 0°04′57″W

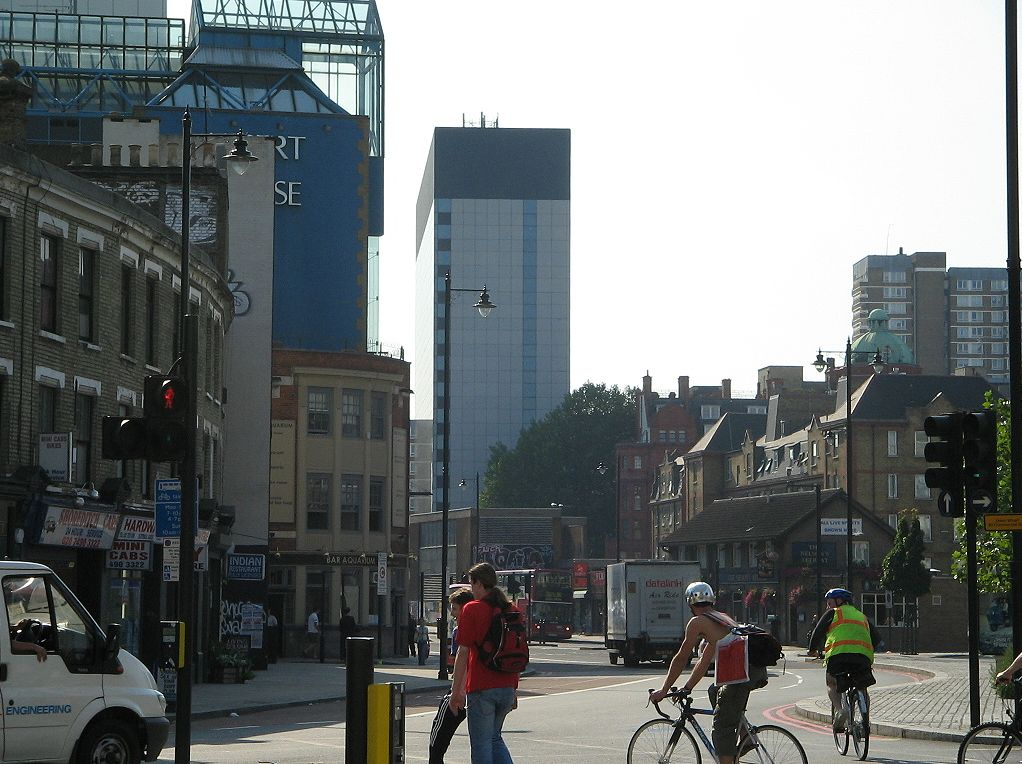
Old Street, looking west.

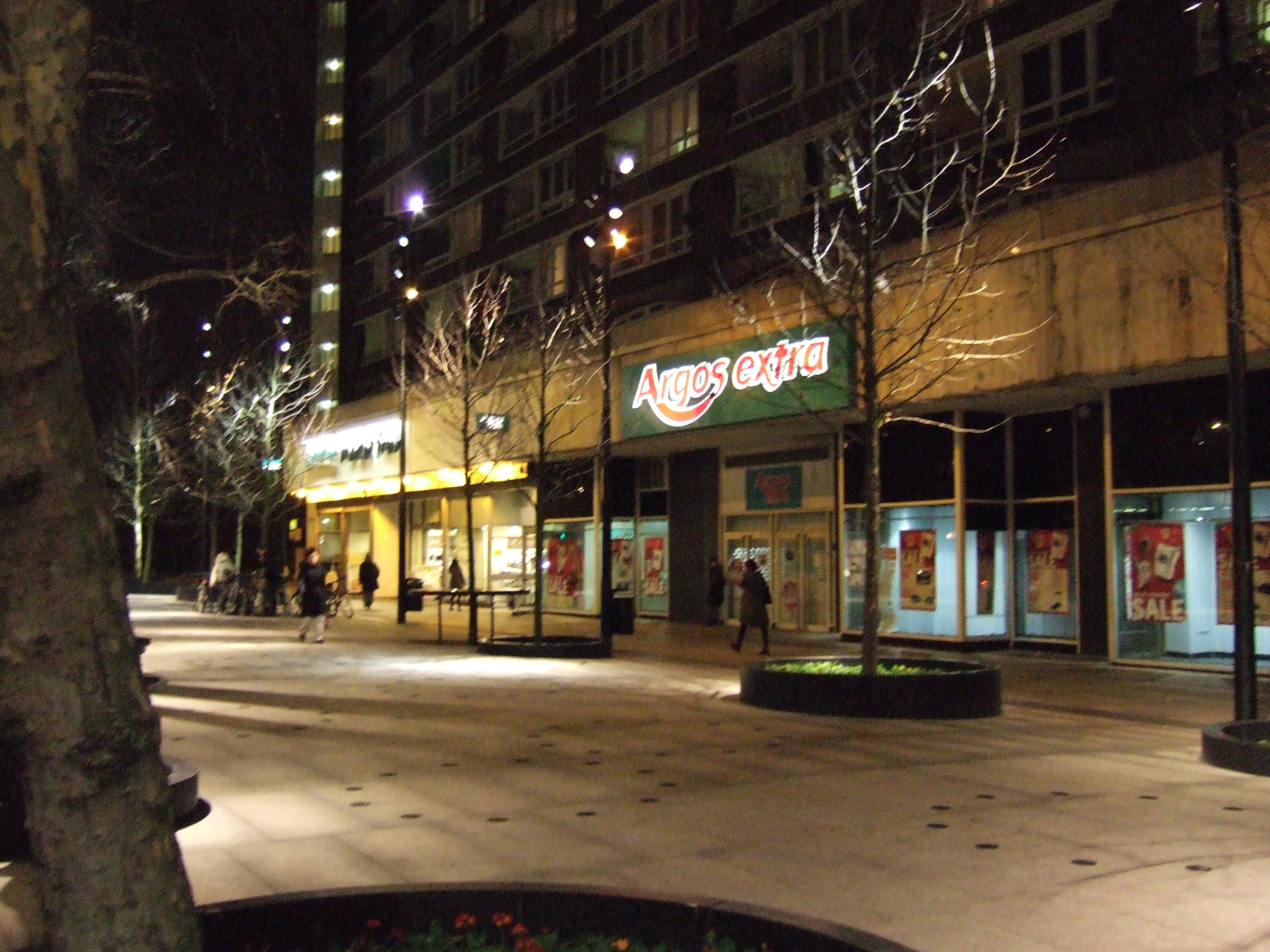
Old Street Promenade of Light.

Old Street is a 1-mile (1.6 km) street in inner north-east Central London, England that runs west to east from Goswell Road in Clerkenwell, in the London Borough of Islington, via St Luke's and Old Street Roundabout, to the crossroads where it meets Shoreditch High Street (south), Kingsland Road (north) and Hackney Road (east) in Shoreditch in the London Borough of Hackney.

It has London Underground station Old Street on the Northern line which has other platforms for National Rail's Northern City Line.

Its western half is inside London's congestion charging zone. The street's middle (from Old Street Station to Great Eastern Street) follows the zone's eastern boundary, while the street's eastern end falls entirely outside the zone.

== History ==
A map showing Old Street ward of Finsbury Metropolitan Borough as it appeared in 1952.

Old Street was recorded as Ealdestrate in about 1200, and le Oldestrete in 1373. As befits its name there are some suggestions that the road is of ancient origin. It lies on the route of an old Roman or possibly pre-Roman track connecting Silchester and Colchester, skirting round the walls of Londinium, known today as the City of London.

The western part was widened between 1872 and 1877, but it narrows east of Coronet Street; there survive, at Nos. 340–342 on the south side of the street and Nos. 323 and 325–329 on the north side, some domestic buildings from the eighteenth and early nineteenth century, though somewhat battered and altered in function. At the east end of Old Street there is a notable deviation of the line of the street as it joins the old Roman Road north to York. This deviation is visible on old maps but unexplained, and is today fronted by Shoreditch Town Hall and the former Shoreditch Magistrates' Court (now a hotel). Together with St Leonard's, Shoreditch at the east end of Old Street, this was the civic hub of the former Metropolitan Borough of Shoreditch.

The eastern half of the road is on the London Inner Ring Road and forms part of the boundary of the London congestion charge zone. Old Street and the surrounding areas of Hoxton Square and Great Eastern Street host a thriving night life. The street and its adjacent areas have attracted IT and tech companies, both established and start-ups, and Old Street Roundabout, located at the junction with City Road, has been dubbed Silicon Roundabout. Old Street station is located under the roundabout. With the increase in passenger numbers using the station, in 2014 Transport for London announced that it was to offer pop-up retail space there as part of a drive to increase its revenue.

Old Street has become favoured for notable graffiti artists such as Banksy and Jef Aérosol. Banksy has featured several pieces on "Shoreditch Bridge". In March 2024, Transport for London ordered the removal of an "Israel–Gaza peace mural" painted on its building opposite Old Street station in London. The mural, created by the charity Circle of Toys, depicted an Israeli girl and a Palestinian girl holding each other's flags, symbolising peace and unity between the two peoples amid the backdrop of the October 7 attacks. Sixteen days after its unveiling, the mural was defaced with a pro-Palestinian message painted in red. To prevent further "antisocial behaviour", TfL ordered its removal, stating that the artwork had not been authorised, and urged the charity to explore alternative locations.

=== James Parrott and the four-minute mile ===
Some (notably Olympic medallist Peter Radford) contend the first successful four-minute mile was run by James Parrott on 9 May 1770. He ran the 1-mile length of Old Street to finish somewhere within the grounds or building of St Leonard's church. Timing methods at this time were – after invention of the chronometer by John Harrison – accurate enough to measure the four minutes correctly, and sporting authorities of the time accepted the claim as genuine. Old Street has a c. 11 foot downward fall (but note intermittent gentle undulations), and the record is not recognised by modern sporting bodies.

== Notes ==
- Bridget Cherry and Nikolaus Pevsner (1998) London: North. London: Penguin Books.
- Ben Weinreb and Christopher Hibbert (1983) "Old Street" in The London Encyclopedia.

== Transport ==
Old Street is served greatly by bus routes:

- 55: Walthamstow - Oxford Circus via Clapton
- 243: Wood Green - Waterloo via Dalston
- N55: Woodford Wells - Oxford Circus via Clapton
- 205: Paddington - Bow via Angel
- 214: Moorgate - Highgate via Camden Town

Briefly:

- 242: Homerton Hospital - Aldgate via Dalston
- 271: Highgate - Moorgate via Holloway

== In fiction ==
In the Charles Dickens novel Bleak House the lawyer's clerk Mr Guppy lunches in Old Street with Richard Carstone on 'lobster and lettuce, without the slugs this time'.
