= City and South London Railway =

Underground railway company in London

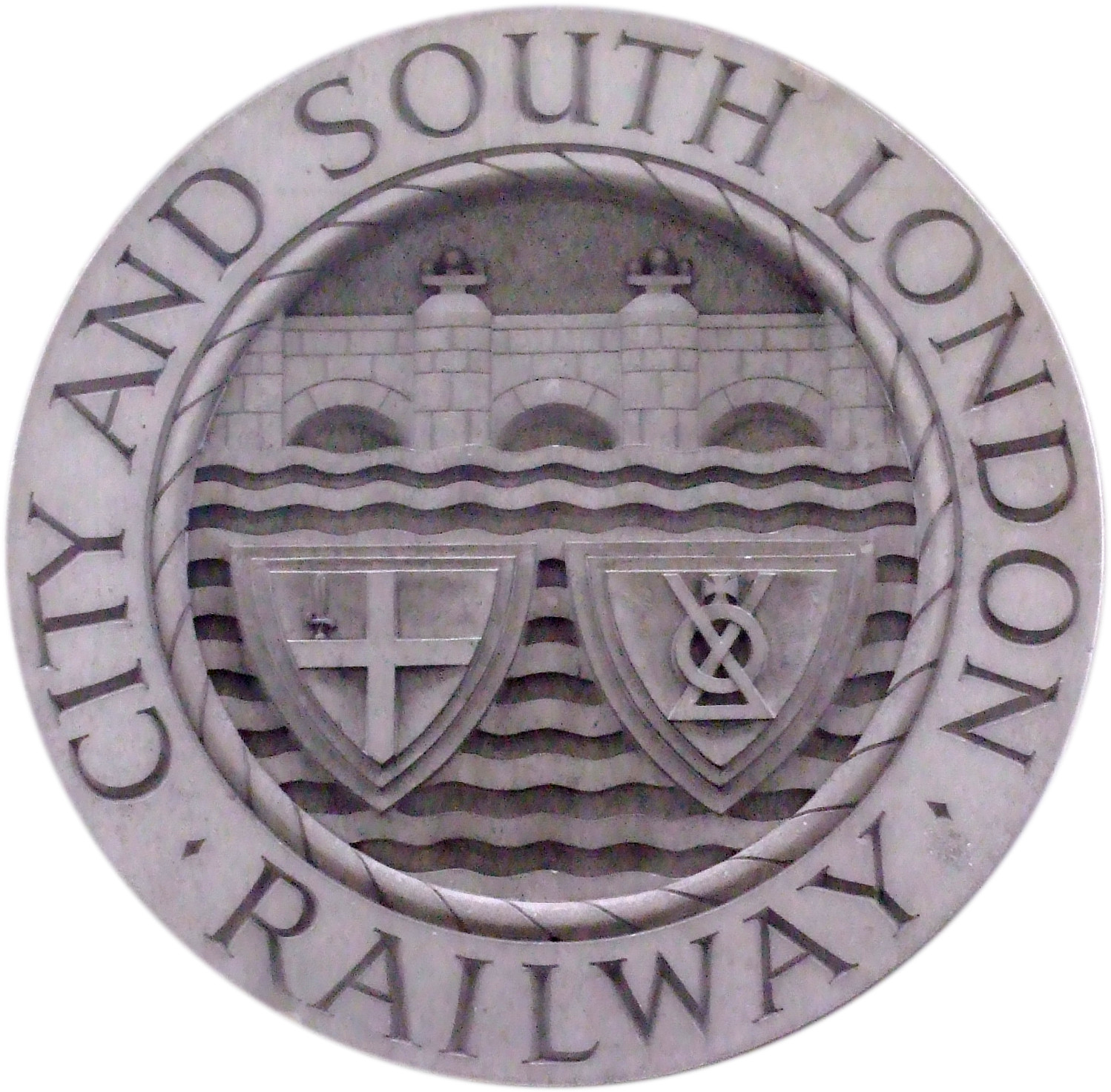

Overview
- Headquarters: London
- Dates of operation: 1890–1933
- Successor: London Passenger Transport Board

Technical
- Track gauge: 4 ft 8 1/2 in (1,435 mm) standard gauge
- Electrification: 500 V DC
- Length: 13.5 miles (21.7 km)

The City and South London Railway (C&SLR) was the first successful deep-level underground "tube" railway in the world, (Note: A "tube" railway is an underground railway constructed in a cylindrical tunnel by the use of a tunnelling shield, usually deep below ground level.) (Note: The first tube railway was the unsuccessful cable hauled Tower Subway.) and the first major railway to use electric traction. The railway was originally intended for cable-hauled trains, but owing to the bankruptcy of the cable contractor during construction, a system of electric traction using electric locomotives – an experimental technology at the time – was chosen instead.

When opened in 1890, the line had six stations and ran for 3.2 miles (5.1 km) in a pair of tunnels between the City of London and Stockwell, passing under the River Thames. The diameter of the tunnels restricted the size of the trains, and the small carriages with their high-backed seating were nicknamed padded cells. The railway was extended several times north and south, eventually serving 22 stations over a distance of 13.5 miles (21.7 km) from Camden Town in north London to Morden in south London.

Although the C&SLR was well used, low ticket prices and the construction cost of the extensions placed a strain on the company's finances. In 1913 the C&SLR became part of the Underground Group of railways, and in the 1920s it underwent major reconstruction works before its merger with another of the Group's railways, the Charing Cross, Euston and Hampstead Railway, forming a single London Underground line called the Morden–Edgware line. In 1933, the London Passenger Transport Board was created by amalgamation of the C&SLR with the rest of the Underground Group, bus and other transport companies. This was a public authority but not nationalised until 1948 with the creation of the British Transport Commission. Today, its tunnels and stations form the Bank Branch of the Northern line from Camden Town to Kennington and the southern leg of the line from Kennington to Morden.

== Establishment ==
In November 1883, notice was given that a private bill was to be presented to Parliament for the construction of the City of London and Southwark Subway (CL&SS). The promoter of the bill, and engineer of the proposed railway, was James Henry Greathead, who had, in 1869–70, constructed the Tower Subway using the same tunnelling shield/segmented cast iron tube method proposed for the CL&SS. The railway was to run from Elephant and Castle, in Southwark, south London, under the River Thames to King William Street in the City of London. The tracks were to be in twin tunnels 10 ft 2 in (3.1 metres) in diameter, running for a distance of 1.25 miles (2.01 km).

City of London and Southwark Subway Act 1884
- Act of Parliament
- Parliament of the United Kingdom
- Long title: An Act to authorise the Construction of a Subway under the River Thames from King William Street in the City of London to Short Street in the Parish of St. Mary Newington in the County of Surrey and for other purposes.
- Citation: 47 & 48 Vict. c. clxvii

Dates
- Royal assent: 28 July 1884
Other legislation
Amended by	City of London and Southwark Subway (Kennington Extensions, &c.) Act 1887; City and South London Railway Act 1890; City and South London Railway Act 1893

Status: Amended

Text of statute as originally enacted

The bill received royal assent as the City of London and Southwark Subway Act 1884 (47 & 48 Vict. c. clxvii) on 28 July 1884. Section 5 of the act stated:

The works authorised by this Act are as follows:

A subway commencing ... near ... Short Street at the ... junction ... with Newington Butts and terminating at King William Street ...
The subway shall consist of two tubes for separate up and down traffic and shall be approached by means of staircases and by hydraulic lifts.

— City of London and Southwark Subway Act 1884, s. 5

City of London and Southwark Subway (Kennington Extensions, &c.) Act 1887
- Act of Parliament
- Parliament of the United Kingdom
- Long title: An Act to empower the City of London and Southwark Subway Company to extend their authorised Subway from the Elephant and Castle to Kennington and Stockwell and for other purposes.
- Citation: 50 & 51 Vict. c. cv

Dates
- Royal assent: 12 July 1887

Text of statute as originally enacted

City and South London Railway Act 1890
- Act of Parliament
- Parliament of the United Kingdom
- Long title: An Act to empower the City of London and Southwark Subway Company to extend their authorised Subway to Clapham to change the name of the Company and for other purposes.
- Citation: 53 & 54 Vict. c. cxiv

Dates
- Royal assent: 25 July 1890

Text of statute as originally enacted

In 1886, a further bill was submitted to Parliament to extend the tunnels south from Elephant and Castle to Kennington and Stockwell. This received assent on 12 July 1887 as the City of London and Southwark Subway (Kennington Extensions, &c.) Act 1887 (50 & 51 Vict. c. cv), allowing the construction of the extension to be added to the work on the original route, which had begun in 1886. The tunnels on this section were of a slightly larger diameter – 10 ft 6 in (3.2 metres) and extended the line by a further 1.75 miles (2.82 km). Before the railway opened, a further bill received assent, granting permission to continue the line south to Clapham Common. The act was given royal assent on 25 July 1890 as the City and South London Railway Act 1890 (53 & 54 Vict. c. cxiv), also effecting a change of the company's name.

== Haulage and infrastructure ==
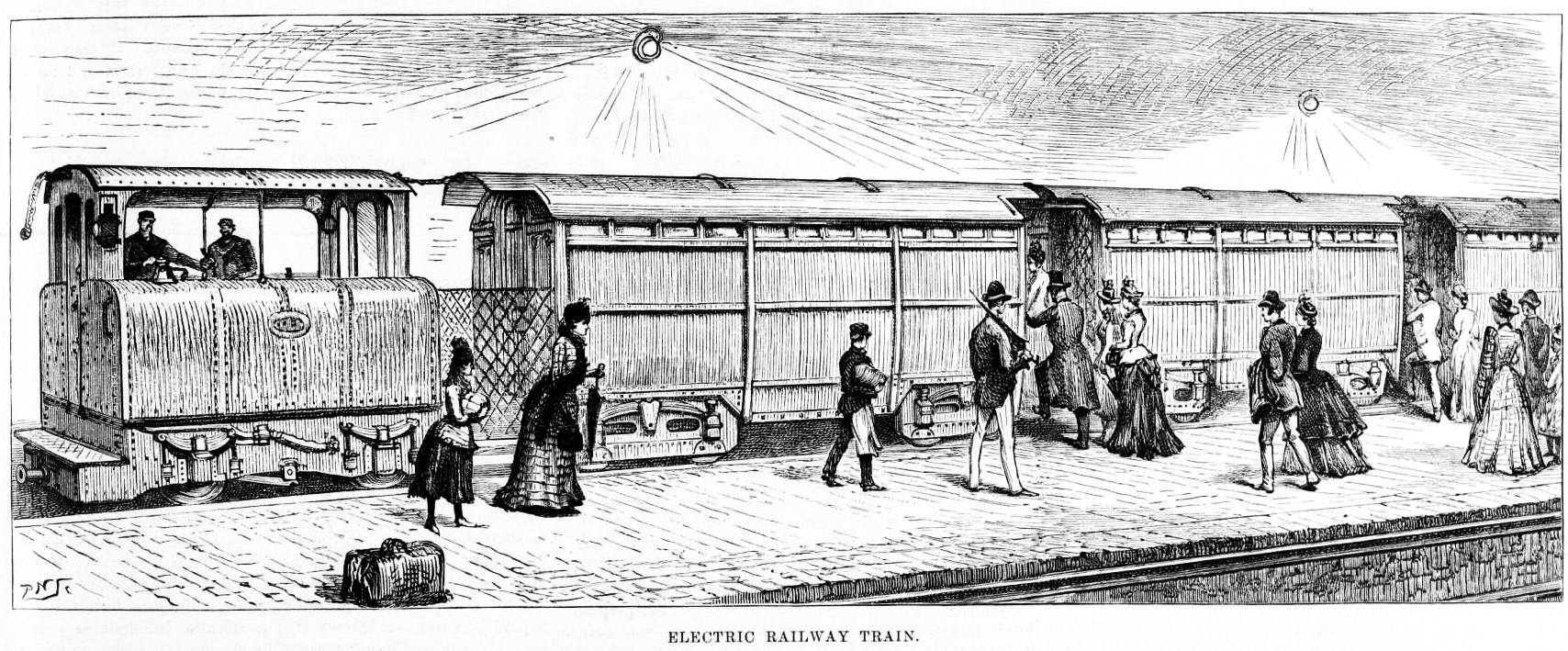
A picture of a City and South London Railway train from The Illustrated London News, 1890

Because of the depth and small diameter of the tunnels along with resulting difficulty of providing sufficient ventilation, steam power used on London's other sub-surface underground railways, would not work for a deep-level tube railway. Like Greathead's earlier Tower Subway, the CL&SS was intended to be operated by cable haulage with a static engine pulling the cable through the tunnels at a steady speed. Section 5 of the 1884 act specified that:

The traffic of the subway shall be worked by ... the system of the Patent Cable Tramway Corporation Limited or by such means other than steam locomotives as the Board of Trade may from time to time approve.

The Patent Cable Tramway Corporation owned the rights to the Hallidie cable-car system first invented and used in San Francisco in 1873; trains were attached to the cable with clamps, which would be opened and closed at stations, allowing the carriages to disconnect and reconnect without needing to stop the cable or to interfere with other trains sharing the cable. There were to be two independent endless cables, one between City station and Elephant and Castle moving at 10 mph (16 km/h), and the other between Elephant and Castle and Stockwell, where the gradient was less, at 12 mph (19 km/h). However, the additional length of tunnel permitted by the supplementary acts challenged the practicality of the cable system.

It is reported that this problem with the CL&SS contributed to the bankruptcy of the cable company in 1888. However, electric motor traction had been considered all along, and much engineering progress had been made since the tunnel's construction had begun in 1886. Hence, CL&SS chairman Charles Grey Mott decided to switch to electric traction. Other cable-operated systems using the Hallidie patents continued to be designed, such as the Glasgow Subway which opened in 1896.

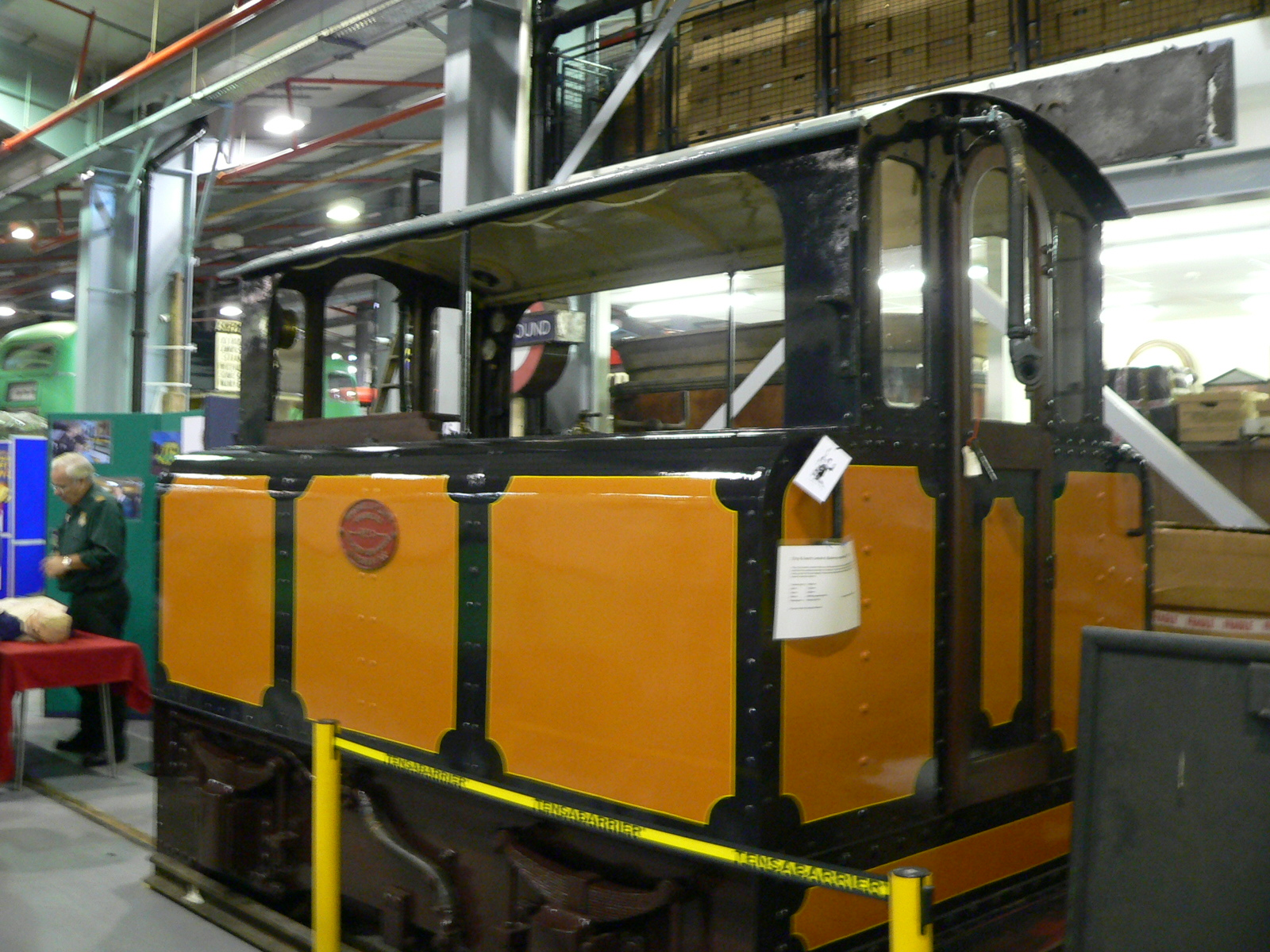
C&SLR locomotive number 13 at the London Transport Museum Depot in 2005

The solution adopted was electrical power, provided via a third rail (now a fourth rail) beneath the train, but offset to the west of centre for clearance reasons. Although the use of electricity to power trains had been experimented with during the previous decade, and small-scale operations had been implemented, the C&SLR was the first major railway in the world to adopt it as a means of motive power. (Note: Electric traction had been used for a number of tramway systems during the 1880s, starting with the Berlin tram system, which opened its first electric line in 1881.) The system operated using electric locomotives built by Mather & Platt collecting a voltage of 500 volts (actually +500 volts in the northbound tunnel and −500 volts in the southbound) from the third rail and pulling several carriages. A depot and generating station were constructed at Stockwell. (Note: Greathead's plan presented to the Institution of Civil Engineers, shows the depot and generating station were on the east side of Clapham Road/Kennington Park Road, approximately where Stockwell Gardens is today.) Owing to the limited capacity of the generators, the stations were originally illuminated by gas. The depot was on the surface, and trains requiring maintenance were initially hauled up via a ramp although, following a runaway accident, a lift was soon installed. In practice, most rolling stock and locomotives went to the surface only for major maintenance.

To avoid the need to purchase agreements for running under surface buildings, the tunnels were bored underneath public roads, where construction could be carried out without charge. At the northern end of the railway, the need to pass deep beneath the bed of the River Thames and the medieval street pattern of the City of London constrained the arrangement of the tunnels on the approach to King William Street station. Because of the proximity of the station to the river, steeply inclined tunnels were built to the west of the station. Because of the narrow street under which they ran, they were bored one above the other rather than side by side as elsewhere. The outbound tunnel was the lower and steeper of the two. The tunnels converged immediately before the station, which was in one large tunnel and comprised a single track with a platform on each side. (Note: The original arrangement was a legacy of the intention to use cable haulage, and would have simplified operations if that method had been used. Instead, it proved a cause of congestion for electric locomotives, and King William Street station was reconfigured in 1895 to have one central platform with a track on each side.) The other terminus at Stockwell was also constructed in a single tunnel but with tracks on each side of a central platform. (Note: The station was rebuilt in the 1920s in the conventional way, with separate tunnels for each platform. The new platforms were south of the original, and were constructed by enlarging the running tunnels.)

== Opening ==
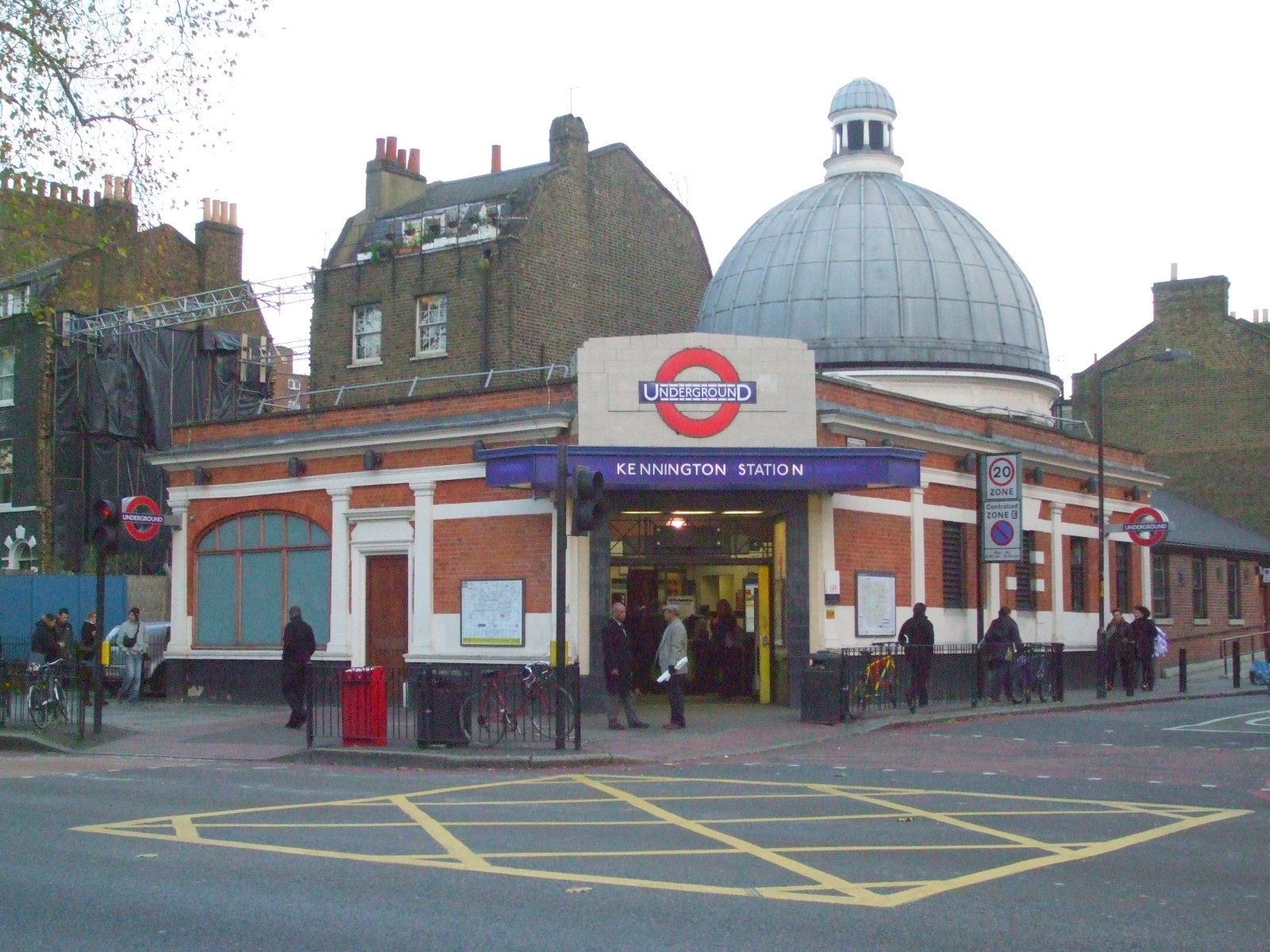
Kennington station, the only one of the original station buildings not replaced or substantially altered

The railway was officially opened by Edward, Prince of Wales (later Edward VII) on 4 November 1890, and was opened to the public on 18 December 1890. Initially, it had stations at:

- Stockwell
- The Oval (now Oval)
- Kennington
- Elephant & Castle
- Borough
- King William Street

The Prince of Wales gave the following speech at the opening:

...thanks for having given me an opportunity of being present to inaugurate a work which I have but little doubt will be of the greatest use to the community, and which will especially be a great boon to this great metropolis. It must be a matter of deep thought to all of us, the ever-increasing growth of this city, and the consequent increasing difficulties of the means of access.

This, the first electric railway in England, (Note: The first electric railway in England was, in fact, the narrow-gauge Volk's Electric Railway in Brighton, opened in 1883.) will, I hope, do much to relieve the congestion of traffic which exists in the City. Business men who have great distances to come will by this means find an easy way of leaving the City and of enjoying the fresh air of the country. The railway will also be a material boon to the working man who is obliged to work all day in a not always pleasant atmosphere; for it will enable him also to get a little fresh air. From a scientific point of view it is a great advantage that you should have two tunnels. This is very different from the large tunnel of the Metropolitan Railway, for here you have no smoke, while you have ample ventilation. You have also a new system, by which you abolish all tickets. All classes of the community are obliged to travel at the same fare, which is the small sum of twopence, and are by a very simple arrangement able to save a great deal of time and trouble.

I have been immensely struck by what I have seen today, and I am sure that the greatest credit redounds upon those who have contrived this scheme, and have carried it to such perfection...

The original service was operated by trains composed of an engine and three carriages. Thirty-two passengers could be accommodated in each carriage, which had longitudinal bench seating and sliding doors at the ends, leading onto a platform for boarding and alighting. It was reasoned that there was nothing to look at in the tunnels, so the only windows were in a narrow band high up in the carriage sides. Gate-men rode on the carriage platforms to operate the lattice gates and announce the station names to the passengers. Because of their claustrophobic interiors, the carriages soon became known as padded cells. Unlike other railways, the C&SLR had no ticket classes or paper tickets; when the railway began operations, a flat fare of two pence, collected at a turnstile, was charged. Despite the cramped carriages and competition from bus and tram services, the railway attracted 5.1 million passengers in 1891, its first year of operation. To alleviate overcrowding, the fleet of rolling stock was enlarged.

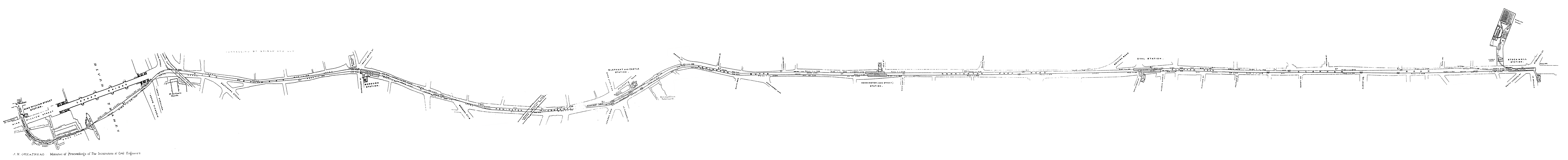
James Henry Greathead's engineering diagram for the original route from King William Street (left) to Stockwell (right)

== Extensions to Clapham Common and Angel, 1890–1901 ==
Shortly before it opened to the public, the C&SLR gave notice of its intention to submit another private bill to Parliament, to construct a new line from its northern terminus at King William Street towards Islington. Because of the awkward arrangement of King William Street station, the extension was not to be connected directly to the existing running tunnels but was to be linked via a pedestrian subway through which passengers could make interchanges between the separate lines. The bill was rejected on the grounds that the extension failed to make a connection to the existing line. In November 1891, the C&SLR published details of a revised bill for the extension to Islington. The company had recognised the deficiencies of its King William Street station and, just a year after the line had opened, planned to construct a new pair of tunnels to bypass the problematic northern section.

City and South London Railway Act 1893
- Act of Parliament
- Parliament of the United Kingdom
- Long title: An Act to empower the City and South London Railway Company to make an Underground Railway to Islington and to extend the time for the purchase of lands for and for the completion of the Underground Railway authorised by the City and South London Railway Act 1890 and for other purposes.
- Citation: 56 & 57 Vict. c. ccvii

Dates
- Royal assent: 24 August 1893

Text of statute as originally enacted

Near Borough station the new tunnels would branch off via a new station to form an interchange with the SE&CR and the LB&SCR at London Bridge mainline station. The tunnels would then pass to the east of London Bridge, north through the City of London to Angel. Following a delay, during which a joint select committee reviewed the proposals of several new underground railways, the City and South London Railway Act 1893 (56 & 57 Vict. c. ccvii) received royal assent on 24 August 1893. The Act also incorporated another Bill of 1893 to grant an extension of time to build the southern extension to Clapham.

City and South London Railway Act 1895
- Act of Parliament
- Parliament of the United Kingdom
- Long title: An Act to further extend the Time for the purchase of Lands for the purposes of the City and South London Railway Act 1890 and for the completion of the Underground Railway thereby authorised and to empower the Company to raise additional Capital and for other purposes.
- Citation: 58 & 59 Vict. c. xix

Dates
- Royal assent: 14 April 1895
Other legislation
Relates to	City and South London Railway Act 1890

Text of statute as originally enacted

City and South London Railway Act 1896
- Act of Parliament
- Parliament of the United Kingdom
- Long title: An Act to extend the time for the purchase of lands for the purposes of the City and South London Railway Act 1893 and for the completion of the underground Railway and works thereby authorised and to empower the Company to acquire additional lands and for other purposes.
- Citation: 59 & 60 Vict. c. cclii

Dates
- Royal assent: 14 August 1896
Other legislation
Amends	City and South London Railway Act 1893

City and South London Railway Act 1898
- Act of Parliament
- Parliament of the United Kingdom
- Long title: An Act to confer further powers upon the City and South London Railway Company for the construction of works and acquisition of lands and for other purposes.
- Citation: 61 & 62 Vict. c. xi

Dates
- Royal assent: 23 May 1898

Text of statute as originally enacted

Construction of the two authorised extensions was delayed while funds were raised and plans were finalised. Between 1895 and 1898, three further Bills were put before Parliament to keep the permissions alive and obtain additional approvals:

- 1895: an extension of time for the 1890 Act and to allow for a new approach tunnel to be built into King William Street station. Approved as the City and South London Railway Act 1895 (58 & 59 Vict. c. xix) on 14 April 1895.
- 1896: an extension of time for the 1893 act and changes to the construction of Bank station. Approved as the City and South London Railway Act 1896 (59 & 60 Vict. c. cclii) on 14 August 1896.
- 1898: an extension of time for the 1896 act, plans to add sidings to the southern extension at Clapham Common and plans to sell King William Street station and its approach tunnels to the newly proposed City and Brixton Railway (C&BR). Approved as the City and South London Railway Act 1898 (61 & 62 Vict. c. xi) on 23 May 1898.

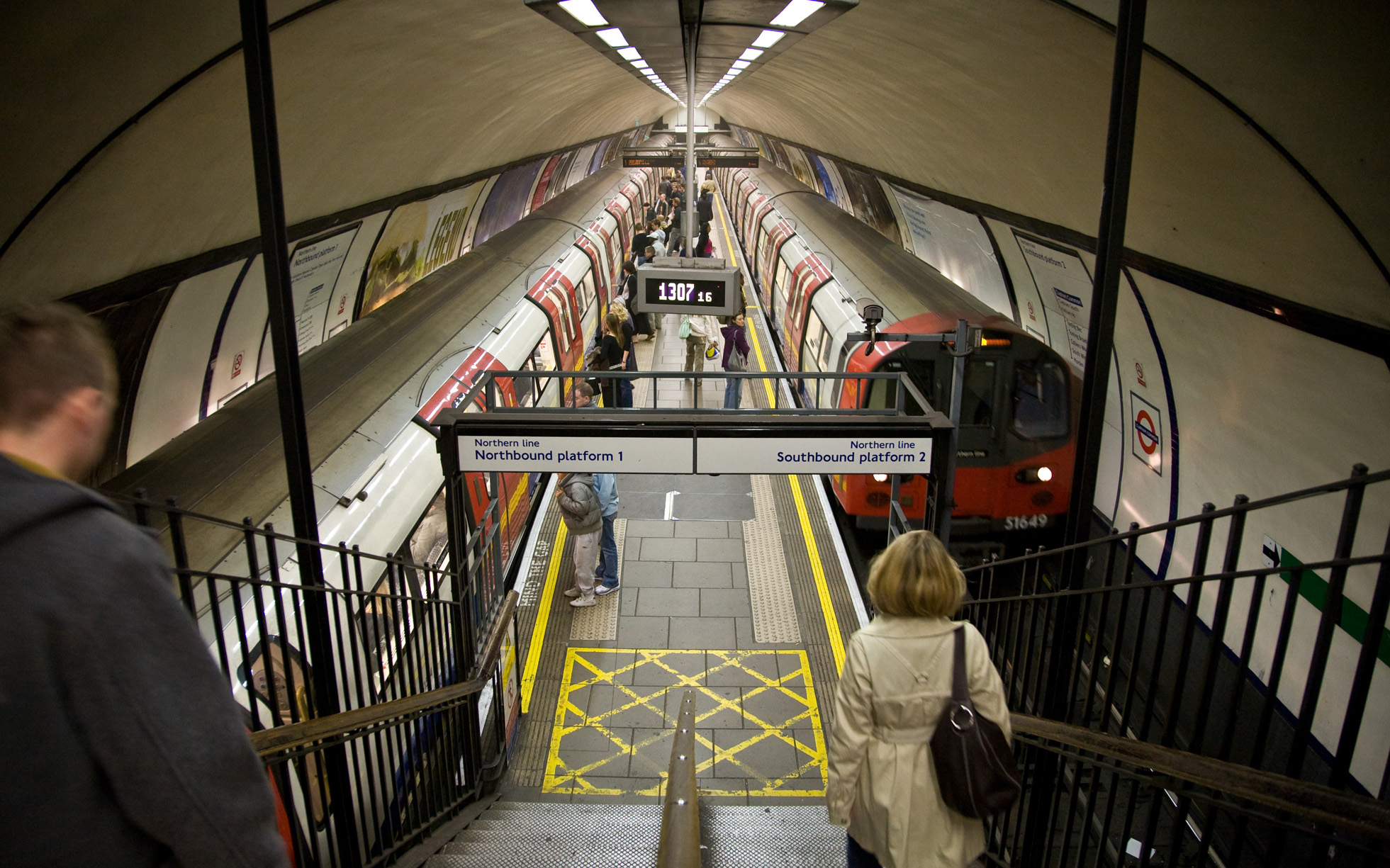
The narrow central platform at Clapham Common with tracks on both sides dates from the 1900 extension.

The new tunnels permitted by the 1895 act enabled the track layout at King William Street station to be modified to a single central platform with a track on each side. This was opened as a temporary measure while funds for the extensions were raised. Finance was eventually obtained, and construction proceeded so that the King William Street section closed and the first section of the northern extension opened on Monday 26 February 1900, with stations at:

- London Bridge
- Bank
- Moorgate Street

The southern extension opened on at mid-day on Sunday 3 June 1900 with stations at:

- Clapham Road
- Clapham Common

Like the original Stockwell station and the rearranged King William Street, Clapham Road and Clapham Common were constructed with a single station tunnel, with a central platform served by tracks on each side. (Note: The C&SLR stations at Angel and Euston were also originally constructed with a single central platform. Reconstruction means that the original station tunnel now serves trains in one direction only – trains in the other direction have been diverted into a new tunnel.)

City and South London Railway Act 1900
- Act of Parliament
- Parliament of the United Kingdom
- Long title: An Act to amend the City and South London Railway Acts 1893 and 1898.
- Citation: 63 & 64 Vict. c. v

Dates
- Royal assent: 25 May 1900

Work continued on the rest of the northern extension. The City and South London Railway Act 1900 (63 & 64 Vict. c. v), approved on 25 May 1900, gave permission to enlarge the station tunnel at Angel to a diameter of 9.2 m (30 ft 2 in) and the rest of the extension opened on 17 November 1901, with stations at:

- Old Street
- City Road (closed 1922)
- Angel

== Extension to Euston, 1901–1907 ==
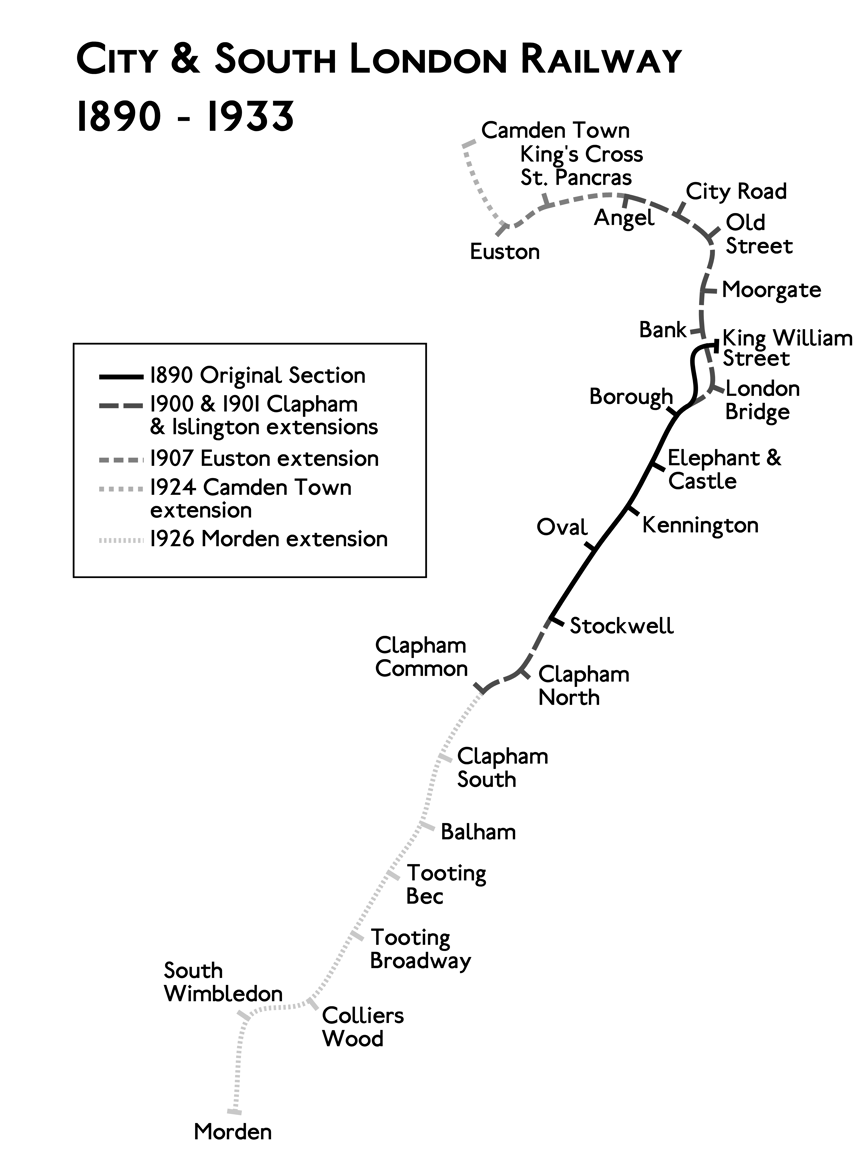
Geographic route map of City and South London Railway

Despite the technical innovations of the railway and the large passenger demand, the C&SLR was not particularly profitable and the rapid series of extensions aimed at improving profits had placed a strain on the finances. The dividends were low and declining (2 1/8% in 1898, 1 7/8% in 1899 and 1 1/4% in 1900) and the company had been accused of extravagance for the abandonment of King William Street station. In an attempt to work around this poor reputation and make it easier to raise funds, the next bill for an extension of the line was submitted in November 1900 by a notionally separate company, the Islington and Euston Railway (I&ER), albeit one that shared its chairman with the C&SLR. (Note: Charles Mott acted as chairman for the C&SLR and the I&ER.)

The proposed railway was to run from the as yet unfinished C&SLR station at Angel to the main-line stations at King's Cross, St Pancras and Euston. The Islington and Euston Railway Bill coincided with a rash of other railway bills encouraged by the successful opening of the Central London Railway (CLR) in 1900 and was considered alongside these by another parliamentary joint committee in 1901. The bill was approved, but the time taken for the committee's review meant that it had to be resubmitted for the 1902 parliamentary session.

In the 1902 session, the bill was considered again but was subject to opposition from one of London's other underground railways, the Metropolitan Railway (MR), which considered the proposed extension to be a threat to its service between King's Cross and Moorgate. The I&ER also submitted a petition to allow the C&SLR to take over the powers of the railway if approved. The committee reversed its earlier decision and rejected the bill. In November 1902, the C&SLR submitted a bill in its own name for the Euston extension as well as the authority to take over the dormant powers of the C&BR. At Euston, the railway was to have an interchange with the planned-but-not-yet-built Charing Cross, Euston and Hampstead Railway (CCE&HR).

City and South London Railway Act 1903
- Act of Parliament
- Parliament of the United Kingdom
- Long title: An Act for empowering the City and South London Railway Company to construct an extension of their underground railway to Euston in the county of London and for transferring to that Company the powers of the City and Brixton Railway Company and for other purposes.
- Citation: 3 Edw. 7. c. clxxiii

Dates
- Royal assent: 11 August 1903

Text of statute as originally enacted

The intention for the C&BR powers was to adapt them to provide a new station at King William Street, which would have pedestrian subway connections to the C&SLR's Bank station and the District Railway's (DR) Monument station. A third pair of tunnels was to be constructed under the Thames to connect with the original abandoned tunnels north of Borough station, and then the C&BR route was to be constructed as previously approved with connections to the existing C&SLR route at London Bridge and Oval. This time, the bill was approved and received royal assent as the City and South London Railway Act 1903 (3 Edw. 7. c. clxxiii) on 11 August 1903. Although the C&BR proposals were never implemented, the Euston extension was quickly built and opened on 12 May 1907, with stations at King's Cross and Euston. A traverser was used at Euston to transfer the locomotives back to the front of the train.

== Cooperation and consolidation, 1907–1919 ==
By 1907, Londoners had seen the network of deep tube underground railways expand from the original C&SLR line of 1890 with its six stations to a network of seven lines serving more than 70 stations. (Note: In order of opening, the seven lines were: 1. C&SLR (1890), 2. Waterloo & City Railway (1898), 3. Central London Railway (1900), 4. Great Northern & City Railway (1904), 5. Baker Street and Waterloo Railway (1906), 6. Great Northern, Piccadilly and Brompton Railway (1906) and 7. Charing Cross, Euston and Hampstead Railway (1907).) These companies, along with the sub-surface Metropolitan Railway and District Railway, criss-crossed beneath the city streets, competing with one another for passengers as well as with the new electric trams and motor buses. In several cases pre-opening predictions of passenger numbers had proven to be over optimistic. The reduced revenues generated from the lower numbers of passengers using the lines made it difficult for the operators to pay back the capital borrowed and pay dividends to shareholders.

In an effort to improve their collective situations, most of the underground railways in London: the C&SLR, the CLR, the Great Northern & City Railway and the Underground Electric Railways Company of London (UERL, which operated the Baker Street and Waterloo Railway (BS&WR), the Great Northern, Piccadilly and Brompton Railway (GNP&BR), the CCE&HR and the DR) began, from 1907, to introduce fare agreements. From 1908, they began to present themselves through common branding as the Underground. The Waterloo and City Railway, operated by the main-line London and South Western Railway, was the only tube railway that did not participate in the arrangement.

In 1912, the C&SLR submitted another bill for parliamentary consideration seeking to increase its capacity by enlarging its tunnels to the larger diameter used for the tunnels of the more recently built railways to allow larger, more modern rolling stock to be used. A separate bill was published at the same time by the London Electric Railway (LER, a company formed by the UERL in 1910 through a merger of the BS&WR, GNP&BR and CCE&HR), which included plans to construct tunnels to connect the C&SLR at Euston to the CCE&HR's station at Camden Town. Together, the works proposed in these Bills would enable the CCE&HR's trains to run over the C&SLR's route and vice versa, effectively combining the two separate railways.

City and South London Railway Act 1913
- Act of Parliament
- Parliament of the United Kingdom
- Long title: An Act for empowering the City and South London Railway Company to enlarge their railway tunnels to raise further money and for other purposes.
- Citation: 3 & 4 Geo. 5. c. cx

Dates
- Royal assent: 15 August 1913

Text of statute as originally enacted

On 1 January 1913, the UERL purchased the C&SLR, paying two shares of its own stock for three of the C&SLR's, a discount reflecting the struggling financial position of the older company. (Note: At the same time, the UERL also bought the Central London Railway, swapping one of its shares for one of the Central's.) Both Bills were enacted on 15 August 1913, as the City and South London Railway Act 1913 (3 & 4 Geo. 5. c. cx) and the London Electric Railway Act 1913 (3 & 4 Geo. 5. c. xcvii).

The proposed extension and tunnel enlargement works were delayed by the First World War, and works could not begin until after the war.

== Reconstruction, connections and extension, 1919–1926 ==
City and South London Railway Act 1919
- Act of Parliament
- Parliament of the United Kingdom
- Long title: An Act for empowering the City and South London Railway Company to construct new subways and works to raise further money to alter the periods during which the Company may pay interest out of capital and make up dividends on preference capital and for other purposes.
- Citation: 9 & 10 Geo. 5. c. ci

Dates
- Royal assent: 19 August 1919
Other legislation
Amended by	London Electric and City and South London Railways Act 1922; City and South London Railway Act 1923

In February 1919, with the war over, the C&SLR submitted a new bill that included provisions for an extension of time for the tunnel enlargement works approved in the 1913 act. The resulting act was passed on 19 August 1919 as the City and South London Railway Act 1919 (9 & 10 Geo. 5. c. ci). In 1920, under special wartime provisions, the LER was granted an extension of time to carry out the works for its own 1913 act. Although the permissions to carry out the works had been renewed, the Underground companies were not in a position to raise the funds needed to pay for the works. Construction costs had increased considerably during the war years and the returns produced by the companies could not cover the cost of repaying borrowed capital.

The projects were made possible when the government introduced the Trade Facilities Act 1921 by which the Treasury underwrote loans for public works as a means of alleviating unemployment. With this support, the Underground companies were able to obtain the funds and work began on enlarging the tunnels of the C&SLR.

The tunnels were enlarged by removing several of the cast iron segments from each tunnel ring, excavating a void behind to the required new diameter and reinstalling the segments with additional packing spacers. The northern section of the C&SLR between Euston and Moorgate was closed from 8 August 1922, but the rest of the line remained open with enlargement works taking place at night. A collapse on 27 November 1923 caused when a train hit temporary shoring on the incomplete excavations near Elephant & Castle station filled the tunnel with soil. The line was briefly operated in two parts, but was completely closed on 28 November 1923.

The Euston to Moorgate section reopened on 20 April 1924, along with the new tunnels linking Euston to Camden Town. The rest of the line to Clapham Common reopened on 1 December 1924. At the same time as the tunnels were being enlarged, the stations were modernised, with longer platforms, a new tiling scheme on platform and passageway walls and new frontages to the surface buildings. Some stations also received escalators to replace the original lifts.

City and South London Railway Act 1923
- Act of Parliament
- Parliament of the United Kingdom
- Long title: An Act for empowering the City and South London Railway Company to extend their railway and to confer further financial and other powers on the Company to confer powers on the London Electric Railway Company the Metropolitan District Railway Company and the Central London Railway Company and for other purposes.
- Citation: 13 & 14 Geo. 5. c. ci

Dates
- Royal assent: 2 August 1923
Other legislation
Amended by	London Electric and Metropolitan District Railways 1926; London Passenger Transport Act 1934

Status: Amended

Text of statute as originally enacted

While the reconstruction works were underway, the C&SLR submitted a bill in 1922 that contained proposals to extend the line south from Clapham Common through Balham and Tooting to Morden in tunnel. From Morden, the line was to continue on the surface to Sutton sharing part of the route of an unbuilt railway planned from Wimbledon to Sutton. (See Wimbledon and Sutton Railway for full details.)

The bill was enacted as the City and South London Railway Act 1923 (13 & 14 Geo. 5. c. ci) on 2 August 1923. Parallel negotiations with the Southern Railway over the proposals curtailed the extension at Morden, where a large new depot was constructed. The Morden extension opened on 13 September 1926, with stations designed by Charles Holden at:

- Clapham South
- Balham (opened on 6 December 1926)
- Tooting Bec (originally Trinity Road)
- Tooting Broadway
- Colliers Wood
- South Wimbledon
- Morden

Also on 13 September 1926, a further connection between the CCE&HR and the C&SLR was opened when tunnels were brought into service from the CCE&HR's Charing Cross station (now Embankment) to Kennington station, the latter having been rebuilt with four platforms. An intermediate station was constructed at Waterloo. Thus fully integrated, combined services operated over the C&SLR and CCE&HR routes using new Standard Stock trains. On tube maps, the combined lines were then shown in a single colour, although the separate names continued in use into the 1930s. Before the introduction of 'Northern line' on 28 August 1937, the names 'Edgware, Highgate and Morden line' and 'Morden–Edgware line' were used in the mid-1930s. (Note: The combined route was shown in black as it is today with the line names Hampstead and Highgate Line and City & South London Railway (for example, see 1926 tube map))

== Move to public ownership, 1924–1933 ==
Despite the modernisation of the C&SLR and other improvements made to other parts of the network, (Note: During World War I, the BS&WR was extended from Paddington to Watford Junction. Post war; extensions of the CLR from Wood Lane to Ealing Broadway (1920) and the CCE&HR from Golders Green to Edgware (1923/1924) were opened.) the Underground railways were still struggling to make a profit. The Underground Group's ownership of the highly profitable London General Omnibus Company (LGOC) since 1912 had enabled the Group, through the pooling of revenues, to use profits from the bus company to subsidise the less profitable railways. (Note: By having a virtual monopoly of bus services, the LGOC was able to make large profits and pay dividends far higher than the underground railways ever had. In 1911, the year before its take-over by the Underground Group, the dividend had been 18 per cent) However, competition from numerous small bus companies during the early years of the 1920s eroded the profitability of the LGOC and had a negative impact on the profitability of the whole Group.

In an effort to protect the Group's income, its managing director/Chairman, Lord Ashfield, lobbied the government for regulation of transport services in the London area. During the 1920s a series of legislative initiatives was made in this direction, with Ashfield and Labour London County Councillor (later MP) Herbert Morrison, at the forefront of debates as to the level of regulation and public control under which transport services should be brought. Ashfield aimed for regulation that would give the existing Group protection from competition and allow it to take substantive control of the LCC's tram system; Morrison preferred full public ownership. Eventually, after several years of false starts, a Bill was announced at the end of 1930 for the formation of the London Passenger Transport Board, a public corporation that would take control of the Underground Group, the Metropolitan Railway as well as all buses and trams within an area designated as the London Passenger Transport Area. The Board was a compromise – public ownership but not full nationalisation – and came into existence on 1 July 1933. On this date, the C&SLR and the other Underground companies were liquidated.

== Legacy ==
The technologies of deep tube tunnelling and electric traction pioneered and proved by the C&SLR shaped the direction of subsequent underground railways built in London. The C&SLR demonstrated that an underground railway could be constructed without the need to purchase large and expensive tracts of land for the shallow cuttings of sub-surface steam operated railways. Instead, it became possible to construct a tunnel at deep level without adversely affecting conditions on the surface.

The C&SLR thus encouraged the construction of a network of underground railways in London far larger than might have been the case otherwise. The size and depth of the tunnels used on the deep tube lines, including the Northern line, does have drawbacks: the tunnels have a limited loading gauge and the lines suffer from overheating in the summer.

During World War II, the disused tunnels between Borough and King William Street stations were converted for use as an air-raid shelter, with entrances to the shelter at King William Street and at six sites south of the Thames (of nine planned). In the 1960s the disused tunnels were used to assist the ventilation of London Bridge station and all the entrances bar that at 9 London Bridge Street were infilled with concrete. It is now only possible to access the tunnels from Three Castles House or a passage from the Jubilee line at London Bridge.

Most of the C&SLR's six original station buildings were rebuilt or modified during the improvements to the line in the 1920s or during more recent modernisations. Only the building at Kennington retains its original exterior and the dome over the lift shaft, a feature of all the original stations.

== Rolling stock ==
=== Locomotives ===
See C&SLR Locomotives for more information

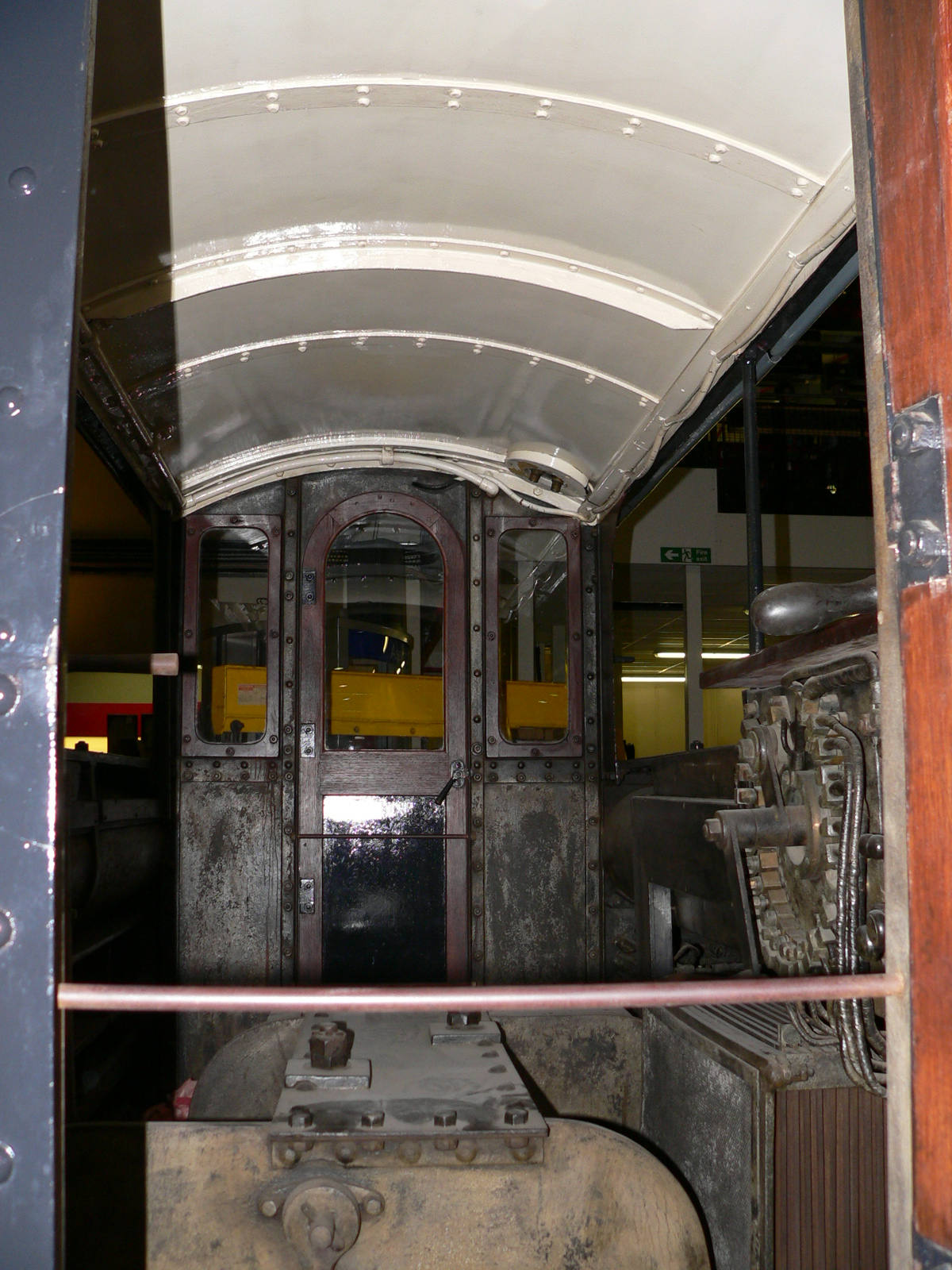
The interior of C&SLR locomotive 13

Numbers	Builder	Built
1–14	Mather & Platt	1889–90
15–16	Siemens Brothers	1891
17	C&SL Stockwell Works	1897–98
18	Crompton & Co.	1897–98
19	Electric Construction Co.	1897–98
20	Thames Ironworks	1897–98
21	C&SL Stockwell Works	1899
22	C&SL Stockwell Works	1900
23–32	Crompton & Co.	1899
33–42	Crompton & Co.	1900
43–52	Crompton & Co.	1901

=== Carriages ===
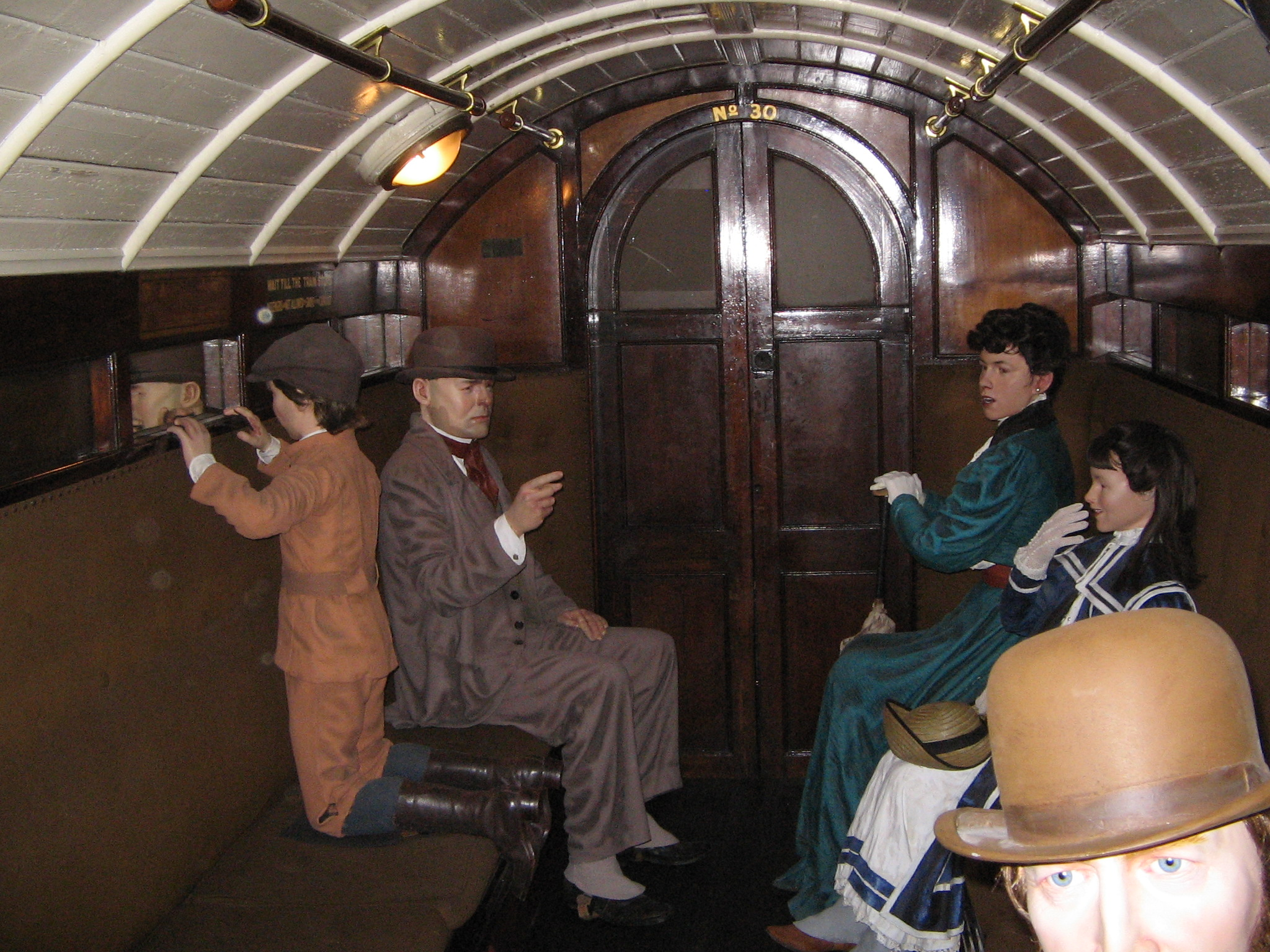
The interior of a C&SLR "padded cell" carriage

Numbers	Builder	Built
1–30	Ashbury Carriage & Iron Co.	1889–90
31–36	G.F. Milnes & Co.	1891
37–39	Bristol Wagon & Carriage Works	1894
40–46	Oldbury Carriage & Wagon Co.	1896
47–54	G.F. Milnes & Co.	1897
55–84	Hurst Nelson & Co.	1899
85–108	G.F. Milnes & Co.	1901
109–124	Bristol Carriage & Wagon Co.	1901
125–132	G.F. Milnes & Co.	1902
133–165	Brush Electrical Engineering Co.	1907

=== Preserved stock ===
A number of the C&SLR's vehicles have been preserved.

Number	Type	Location	Notes
13	locomotive	London Transport Museum (Covent Garden)	On loan from the National Railway Museum
30	carriage	London Transport Museum (Covent Garden)	
63	muck wagon	London Transport Museum (Acton Depot)	Used during 1922–23 reconstruction
67	carriage	Hockley, Essex at holiday chalet	
135	carriage	Hope Farm, Sellindge, Kent owned by Electric Railway Museum, Warwickshire	Awaiting restoration
163	carriage	Neasden Depot owned by London Transport Museum	Awaiting restoration

Locomotive 35 had been placed on display on a pedestal at the Metropolitan line's Moorgate station following the C&SLR's reconstruction. It was badly damaged during an air raid, and was eventually removed. Carriage number 39 survived for over two decades after withdrawal as a summer house at Watlington, Oxfordshire.

== See also ==
- List of crossings of the River Thames
- Tunnels underneath the River Thames

== Notes and references ==
=== Bibliography ===
- Badsey-Ellis, Antony (2005). London's Lost Tube Schemes. Capital Transport. ISBN 1-85414-293-3.
- Connor, J.E. (1999). London's Disused Underground Stations. Capital Transport. ISBN 1-85414-250-X.
- Day, John R; Reed, John (2008) [1963]. The Story of London's Underground. Capital Transport. ISBN 978-1-85414-316-7.
- Greathead, James Henry (1896). The City and South London Railway: With Some Remarks Upon Subaqueous Tunnelling by Shield and Compressed Air. Institution of Civil Engineers.
- McCarthy, Colin; McCarthy, David (2009). Railways of Britain – London North of the Thames. Hersham, Surrey: Ian Allan Publishing. ISBN 978-0-7110-3346-7.
- Rose, Douglas (1999) [1980]. The London Underground, A Diagrammatic History. Douglas Rose/Capital Transport. ISBN 1-85414-219-4.
- Wolmar, Christian (2005) [2004]. The Subterranean Railway: How the London Underground Was Built and How It Changed the City Forever. Atlantic Books. ISBN 1-84354-023-1.
- Hopkinson, E. (1893). "Electrical Railways: The City and South London Railway. (Including Appendix and Plate at Back of Volume)". Minutes of the Proceedings. 112 (1893): 209. doi:10.1680/imotp.1893.20031.
