= Fluffer (London Underground) =

London Underground tunnel track cleaner

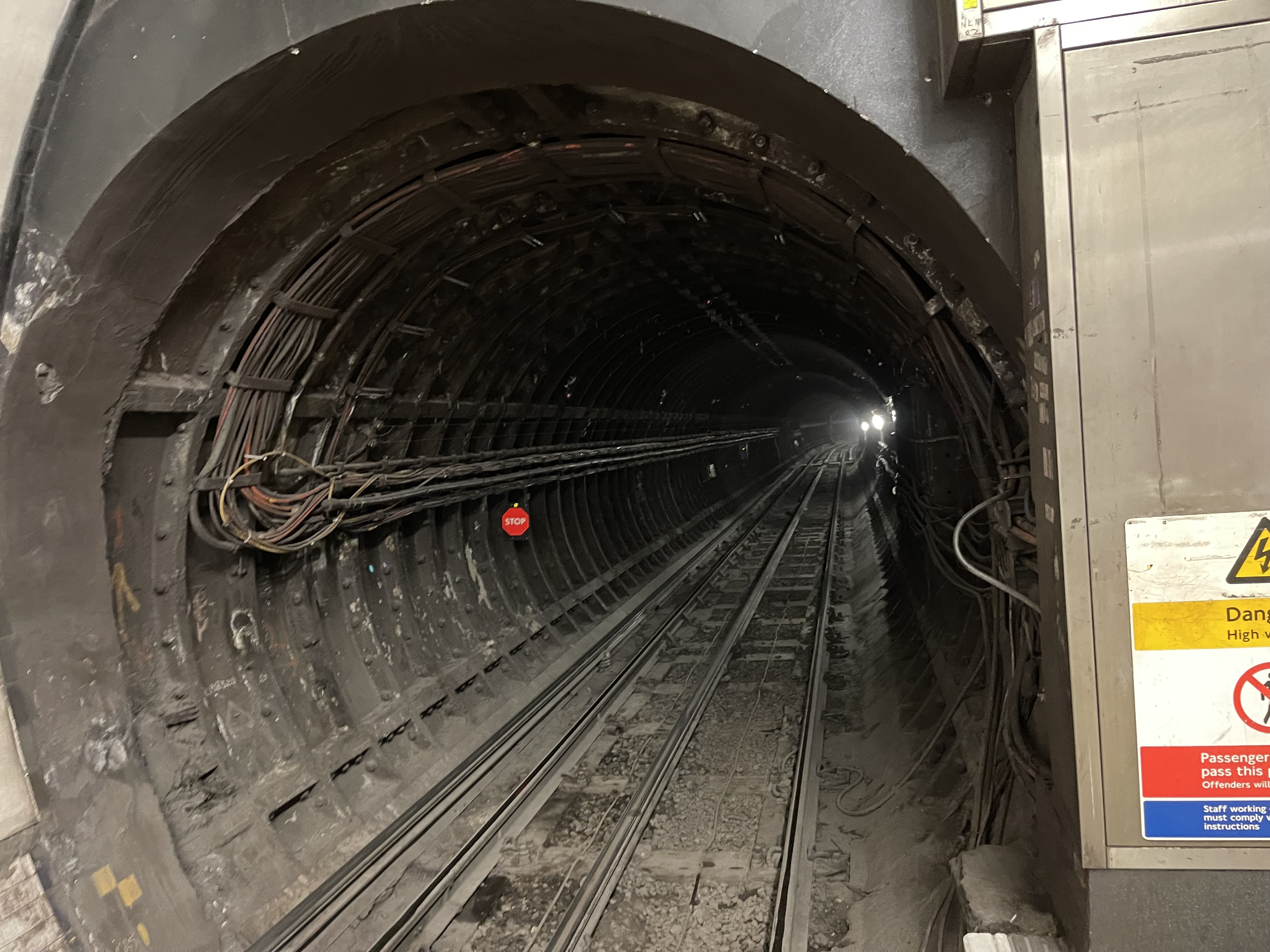
London Underground tunnel at Bank station

On the London Underground, fluffers or track cleaning teams are people employed to clean the tracks in the tunnels. The passage of the trains through the tunnels draws in dust and rubbish, and removing this debris is essential to maintain the safety of the Underground, as it would otherwise create a fire hazard.

The work is done at night during Engineering Hours, when the trains have finished running, and the electricity is switched off. Cleaning the tunnels is a heavy and dirty job, which has traditionally been a role carried out by teams of women. In 1947, a newsreel made by British Pathé captured the fluffers on film carrying carbide lamps, long brushes and scraping tools. The rubbish was removed in dustbins, loaded onto a trolley that was drawn along the rails.

In 1989, documentary filmmaker Molly Dineen chronicled the work of a team of fluffers at Angel station in Islington for the BBC2 documentary The Heart of the Angel. By the mid 1990s, the fluffers were using electric torches and protective clothing, and collected the dust in plastic bags. Fluffer teams still tended to be mainly made up of women.

By 2023 the teams were using vacuum cleaners and magnetic wands, and "tube dust" (particles of iron oxide, chromium, quartz and copper produced by the wheels and tracks) was becoming a health concern for train drivers.
