= Fluffing =

Fluffing can mean:

- A practice in public relations of spinning a topic to present it in the most positive light
- A fluffer is a person who prepares the actors for their participation in pornography roles
- Fluffer (London Underground), a person who cleans the tunnels during the night, while the trains are not running

== In film ==
- The Fluffer, an American film about a man hired to work as a fluffer for a gay pornographic film company

== In music ==
- Fluffers (band), a British rock music group
