= Thomas Smith =

Thomas Smith may refer to:

== Politics ==
- Thomas Smith (MP for Midhurst), MP for Midhurst
- Thomas Smith (MP for Great Bedwyn) (1382–1399), English politician
- Thomas Smith (MP for New Romney) (1419–1432), MP for New Romney
- Thomas Smith (MP for Dover), 1470–1471
- Thomas Smith (MP for Bristol), 1512, MP for Bristol
- Thomas Smith (MP for Chippenham), 1554
- Sir Thomas Smith (diplomat) (1513–1577), English scholar and diplomat
- Thomas Smith (MP for multiple constituencies) (1522–1591), Member of Parliament for Tavistock, Aylesbury, Rye, Winchelsea and Portsmouth
- Thomas Smith (MP for Wigan), MP for Wigan, 1558
- Thomas Smith (English judge) (c. 1556–1609), member of parliament for Cricklade, and for Tamworth
- Thomas Smith (MP for Sudbury), MP for Sudbury, 1626
- Thomas Smith (governor of South Carolina) (1648–1694), governor of South Carolina, planter, merchant and surgeon
- Thomas Smith (died 1728) (c. 1686–1728), British Whig politician, MP for four constituencies 1709–1728
- Thomas Smith (Royal Navy officer, died 1762) (1707–1762), governor of Newfoundland and Labrador
- Thomas Smith Jr. (1755-1800), Mathews County Virginia lawyer, patriot and politician
- Thomas Smith (Pennsylvania congressman) (bef. 1782–1846), Federalist member of the US House of Representatives from Pennsylvania
- Thomas Smith (Indiana politician) (1799–1876), member of the US House of Representatives from Indiana
- Thomas Smith (Oregon politician), member of the Oregon Territorial Legislature, 1855–1856
- Thomas Smith (Oklahoma politician), American politician and Oklahoma secretary of state
- Thomas Smith (Upper Canada politician) (1754–1833), land surveyor, merchant and politician in Upper Canada
- Thomas Smith (Gloucester politician) (1785-1841), Virginia merchant and politician
- Thomas Alexander Smith (1850–1932), educator and congressman from Maryland
- Thomas B. Smith (mayor) (1869–1949), mayor of Philadelphia 1916–1920
- Thomas Eustace Smith (1831–1903), British member of parliament for Tynemouth and North Shields, 1868–1885
- Thomas F. X. Smith (1928–1996), mayor of Jersey City, New Jersey
- Thomas Francis Smith (1865–1923), lawyer and congressman from New York
- Thomas Hawkins Smith (1829–1902), New South Wales politician
- Thomas Henry Smith (Canadian politician) (1848–1919), politician in Manitoba, Canada
- Thomas Henry Smith (American politician) (1854–1936), politician from Iowa
- Thomas Richard Smith (1843–1918), New South Wales politician
- Thomas S. Smith (politician) (1917–2002), member of the New Jersey General Assembly
- Thomas Vernor Smith (1890–1964), congressman from Illinois, Army officer and professor
- Thomas Whistler Smith (1824–1859), New South Wales politician
- Thomas Smith (Australian politician) (1846–1925), Victorian politician
- Sir Thomas Smith (Chester MP), English politician who sat in the House of Commons, 1640–1644
- Sir Thomas Smith, 1st Baronet, of Hatherton (1622–1675), English politician
- Thomas Barlow Smith (1839–1933), merchant, ship builder, author and political figure in Nova Scotia, Canada
- Thomas Smith (Cavalier) (1609–1642), English Member of Parliament
- Thomas Smith (East India Company) (1558–1625), English merchant, politician and first governor of the East India Company
- Thomas Rhett Smith (1768–1829), intendant (mayor) of Charleston, South Carolina
- Thomas Smith (Lord Mayor of London) (1746–1823), merchant and Lord Mayor of London
- T. Dan Smith (Thomas Daniel Smith, 1915–1993), British Labour Party politician

== Judges ==
- Thomas Smith (judge, died 1609) (c.1556–1609), English master of requests
- Thomas Smith (landgrave) (1670–1739), English-American slave-trader, judge, and merchant in South Carolina
- Thomas Smith (Pennsylvania judge) (1745–1809), American politician and judge
- Thomas Cusack-Smith (1795–1866), Irish judge
- Thomas Smith (Indiana judge) (1805–1875), justice of the Indiana Supreme Court
- Thomas J. Smith (judge) (1838–1918), chief justice of the New Mexico Territorial Supreme Court
- Thomas Sercombe Smith (1858–1937), British civil servant and judge
- Thomas Benton Smith (judge) (1952–2023), American judge in Florida

== Military ==
- Thomas Smith (English soldier) (fl. 1600–1627)
- Thomas Benton Smith (1838–1923), Confederate brigadier general
- Thomas Smith (Medal of Honor, 1865) (1838–1905), American Civil War sailor
- Thomas J. Smith (Medal of Honor), American Indian Wars soldier
- Thomas Smith (Medal of Honor, 1878) (1856–?), American sailor
- Thomas Kilby Smith (1820–1887), lawyer, soldier, and diplomat from the state of Ohio
- Thomas Adams Smith (1781–1844), American military officer and government official
- Thomas C. H. Smith, lawyer, businessman, soldier and officer of the U.S. Treasury Department
- Thomas Smith (Royal Navy officer, died 1708), British Royal Navy captain and renegade

== Business and professional ==
- Thomas Smith (Registrary) (fl. late 16th century), fourth recorded Registrary of the University of Cambridge
- Thomas Smith (banker) (1631–1699), founder of the first bank in England outside London
- Thomas Smith (engineer) (1752–1814), Scottish businessman and lighthouse engineer
- Thomas Southwood Smith (1788–1861), English physician
- Thomas Smith (headmaster) (1814–1879), governor of Elmfield College (1868–?)
- Thomas Roger Smith (1830–1903), English architect and academic
- Sir Rudolph Smith (Thomas Rudolph Hampden Smith, 1869–1958), British surgeon
- Sir Thomas Smith (barrister) (1915–1988), lawyer, soldier and academic
- Thomas S. Smith (educator) (1921–2004), president of Lawrence University
- Thomas Smith (finance professor) (born 1958), Australian finance professor
- Thomas Smith & Sons, crane manufacturers of Rodley, West Yorkshire, UK
- Sir Thomas Smith, 1st Baronet, of Stratford Place (1833–1909), British surgeon
- Thomas B. Smith (conservation biologist), American evolutionary and conservation biologist

== Sports ==
=== Cricket ===
- Thomas Smith (cricketer, born 1848) (1848–?), English cricketer
- Thomas Smith (cricketer, born 1854) (1854–?), English cricketer
- Thomas Smith (cricketer, born 1898) (1898–1926), Australian cricketer
- Thomas Smith (cricketer, born 1899) (1899–1965), English cricketer
- Thomas Smith (cricketer, born 1905) (1905–1993), English cricketer

=== Other sports ===
- Thomas Smith (Australian footballer) (1851–1909)
- Thomas Smith (cornerback) (born 1970), American professional football player
- Thomas Smith (English footballer) (1869–?)
- Thomas Smith (Scottish footballer) (1908–?)
- Thomas Potter Smith (1901–1977), English footballer
- Thomas Smith (sport shooter) (1931–2022), American Olympic shooter
- Thomas H. Smith (1830–?), Irish Australian who played a role in the origin of Australian football
- R. Thomas Smith (1878–1957), American thoroughbred race horse trainer
- Thomas William Smith (1883–1960), rugby union forward
- Thom Smith, (born 1999), English rugby union player
- Thomas Smith (high jumper), 1987 and 1988 NCAA DI outdoor high jump champion

== Others ==
- Thomas Smith (translator and controversialist) (c. 1624–1661), scholar at Christ's College, Cambridge
- Thomas Smith (bishop of Carlisle) (1615–1702), English Anglican bishop
- Thomas Smith (vicar apostolic of the Northern District) (1763–1831), English Roman Catholic bishop
- Thomas Smith (scholar) (1638–1710), English antiquarian
- Thomas Smith (American painter) (c. 1650–1691), American artist and mariner
- Thomas Smith (English painter) (died 1767), English landscape painter
- Thomas Smith (Dean of Carlisle) (fl. 1548–1577), English priest
- Thomas Smith (archdeacon) (fl. 1899–1955), New Zealand priest
- Thomas Smith (parson) (1701–1795), American religious leader, real estate speculator, physician, and advocate for ethnic genocide
- Thomas Smith (missionary) (1817–1906), founder of the zenana missions
- Thomas Smith (trade unionist) (1847–1919), English trade unionist and politician
- Thomas L. Smith (1801–1866), also known as "Pegleg", American mountain man
- Thomas R. Smith (poet) (born 1948), American poet
- Thomas J. Smith (lawman) (1830–1870), town marshal of Old West cattle town Abilene, Kansas
- Thomas James Smith (1827–1896), founder of Smith & Nephew, one of the UK's largest medical devices businesses
- Thomas Sydney Smith, Indian lawyer; advocate general of Madras, 1861–1863
- Thomas Stuart Smith (1815–1869), painter and philanthropist
- Thomas Buckingham Smith (1810–1871), author and surveyor in Florida
- Thomas Assheton Smith I (1752–1828), English landowner and all-round sportsman
- Thomas Assheton Smith II (1776–1858), English landowner and all-round sportsman
- W. Thomas Smith Jr. (born 1959), American author, editor, and journalist
- Thomas Henry Smith (poet) (1824–1907), New Zealand judge and poet
- Thomas Corregio Smith (1743–1811), painter and brother of John Raphael Smith
- Thomas Smith, fictional character living in the Nazi-occupied US, in the television adaptation of The Man in the High Castle
- Thomas Jollie Smith, Presbyterian minister and academic in Australia
- Thomas Smith (1682–1728), high sheriff of Leicestershire
- Thomas Smith (actor) (died 1766), British stage actor

== See also ==
- Thomas H. Smith (pilot boat), a 19th-century Sandy Hook pilot boat
- Tom Smith (disambiguation)
- Tommy Smith (disambiguation)
- Thomas Smyth (disambiguation)
- Thomas Smythe (disambiguation)
