= Thomas B. Smith =

Thomas B. Smith may refer to:

- Thomas B. Smith (mayor), American politician, mayor of Philadelphia, Pennsylvania, 1916–1920
- Thomas Barlow Smith (1839–1933), Canadian politician
- Thomas Benton Smith (1838–1923), Confederate States Army general
- Thomas Benton Smith (judge), American judge in Florida
- Thomas Buckingham Smith (1810–1871), American lawyer
- Thomas B. Smith (conservation biologist), American evolutionary and conservation biologist

== See also ==
- Thomas Smith (disambiguation)
