= Benjamin Waring IV =

South Carolina politician

Capt. Benjamin Robert Waring IV

Member of the South Carolina Senate
- In office 1787-1788

Personal details
- Born: 26 April 1741 Dorchester County, South Carolina
- Died: 8 October 1811 (aged 70) Columbia, South Carolina, United States
- Spouse: Anne Waring
- Children: at least 1
- Parent: Benjamin Waring III
- Relatives: Waring Family
- Occupation: mill owner, politician

Military service
- Rank: Captain
- Battles/wars: American Revolutionary War; Battle of Black Mingo; Siege of Fort Watson; Siege of Fort Motte; Battle of Eutaw Springs

Captain Benjamin Robert Waring IV was an American mill owner and politician who served under Francis Marion during the American Revolutionary War. He later went on to serve in the South Carolina Senate. He also built what is believe to be the first paper mill in the United States in the early 1800s in Columbia, South Carolina. He even represented Columbia, South Carolina nationally as a chairman in a letter to Thomas Jefferson in 1804.

== Life ==
Benjamin Waring IV was born in 1741 to Benjamin Waring III and Florence Waring and a descendant of Benjamin Waring from both parents. He served under Francis Marion during the American Revolutionary War and fought at the Battle of Black Mingo, Siege of Fort Watson, Siege of Fort Motte, and the Battle of Eutaw Springs.

He served in the South Carolina Senate from 1787 to 1788, subsequently owning a mill at Columbia, South Carolina. He died there in 1811, aged 70.
