= Benjamin Waring II =

South Carolina politician

Col. Benjamin Robert Waring II

Commissioner of the Peace for Berkeley County, South Carolina
- In office 1734

Member of the South Carolina House of Commons
- In office 1720

Personal details
- Born: 1686 Province of Carolina
- Died: 26 July 1739 (aged 52–53) Charleston County, Colony of South Carolina
- Spouse: Anne Smith
- Children: 8, including Benjamin Waring III
- Parent: Benjamin Waring
- Relatives: Waring Family
- Occupation: planter, politician

Military service
- Rank: Colonel

Col. Benjamin Robert Waring II was an early American politician and planter who was the son of Benjamin Waring. He was also an early member of the South Carolina House of Commons, serving in the 1720s.

== Early life & Family ==
Benjamin Waring II was born in 1689 to Benjamin Waring and Elizabeth Beamor. He married Anne Smith, daughter of Thomas Smith II and granddaughter of Thomas Smith I.

== Political career ==
He served as Commissioner of the Peace for Berkeley County, South Carolina in 1734 and earlier served in the South Carolina House of Commons in 1720.

== Later life & Legacy ==
He held the rank of Colonel in the local militia and died in July 1739, aged 52–53. He was the great-grandfather of Morton Waring.
