= Whiskinboo Creek =

- Unincorporated community
- Location within South Carolina Location within the United States
- Coordinates: 33.25295°N 79.91313°W
- Country: United States
- State: South Carolina
- County: Berkeley
- Elevation: 13 ft (4.0 m)
- Time zone: UTC-5 (Eastern (ET))
  - Summer (DST): UTC-5 (CDT)
- Area codes: 843 & 854
- GNIS feature ID: 1251406

Whiskinboo Creek is a creek in Berkeley County, South Carolina, in the United States. It is located near Moncks Corner and Bonneau and is primarily rural.

== History ==
Settlements and plantations began being built in the area as early as the 1600s. Before that, Native tribes were active in the area. Thomas Smith (Judge) and his father Thomas Smith (governor of South Carolina) were Baron's of the area, owning around 15,000 acres in the area during the early colonial period.
