= Thomas Smyth =

Thomas Smyth, Thomas Smythe or Tommy Smyth may refer to:

- Thomas Smythe (customer) (1522–1591), collector of customs duties ("customer") in London during the Tudor period.
- Sir Thomas Smythe (1558–1625), English entrepreneur
- Thomas Smyth (bishop) (1650–1725), Irish bishop
- Sir Thomas Smyth, 1st Baronet (c. 1602–1668), English landowner
- Sir Thomas Smyth, 2nd Baronet (after 1657–1732), Irish politician
- Thomas Smyth (Archdeacon of Glendalough) (fl. 1723–1751), Irish Anglican priest
- Thomas Smyth (Limerick MP) (1740–1785), Irish politician
- Thomas Smyth (merchant) (1737–1824), English merchant, banker and lord mayor of Liverpool
- Thomas Smyth (Archdeacon of Lismore) (fl. 1788–1826), Irish Anglican priest
- Thomas Smyth (minister) (1808–1873), American Presbyterian minister
- Thomas Alfred Smyth (1832–1865), major general in the Union Army during the American Civil War
- Tommy Smyth (rugby union) (1884–1928), Irish international rugby union prop forward
- Thomas Smyth (Irish nationalist politician) (1875–1937), member of parliament for South Leitrim, 1906–1918
- Tommy Smyth (born 1946), Irish-American soccer commentator

== See also ==
- Thomas Smythe (disambiguation)
- Thomas Smith (disambiguation)
- Tom Smith (disambiguation)
- Tommy Smith (disambiguation)
