= Tom Smith =

Tom Smith may refer to:

== Sports ==
=== Association football ===
- Tom Smith (footballer, born 1876) (1876–1937), scorer for Tottenham Hotspur in the 1901 FA Cup Final replay
- Tom Smith (footballer, born 1877) (1877–?), English footballer with Preston North End, Southampton and Queens Park Rangers
- Tom Smith (footballer, born 1900) (1900–1934), English footballer with Leicester City, Manchester United and Northampton Town
- Tom Smith (footballer, born 1909) (1909–1998), Scottish footballer with Kilmarnock, Preston North End and Scotland, also managed Kilmarnock
- Tom Smith (footballer, born 1911) (1911–1986), English footballer for Rochdale and Luton Town
- Tom Smith (footballer, born 1973), Scottish footballer with Partick Thistle, Ayr United, Clydebank and Hibernian
- Tom Smith (footballer, born 1998), English footballer with Swindon Town
- Tom Smith (footballer, born 2002), English footballer with Arsenal and Colchester United

=== Baseball ===
- Tom Smith (second baseman) (1851–1889), Major League player
- Tom Smith (pitcher) (1871–1929), Major League player
- Tom Smith (UNC Asheville baseball coach), American college baseball coach
- Tom Smith (baseball coach, born 1942), American college baseball coach for Michigan State

=== Cricket ===
- Tom Smith (cricketer, born 1906) (1906–1995), English cricketer for Essex
- Tom Smith (cricketer, born 1985), English cricketer who currently plays for Lancashire
- Tom Smith (cricketer, born 1987), English cricketer who currently plays for Gloucestershire
- Tom Smith (cricketer, born 1996), English cricketer

=== Rugby union ===
- Tom Smith (rugby union, born 1883) (1883–1960), English rugby union player
- Tom Smith (rugby union, born 1893) (c. 1893 – c. 1965), Australian rugby union player
- Tom Smith (rugby union, born 1953), Scottish rugby union player
- Tom Smith (rugby union, born 1971) (1971–2022), Scottish rugby union player
- Tom Smith (rugby union, born 1985), Welsh rugby union player
- Thom Smith, (born 1999) English rugby union player
- Tommy Smyth (rugby union) , Irish rugby union player

=== Other sports ===
- Tom Smith (horse trainer) (1878–1957), American thoroughbred racehorse trainer of Seabiscuit
- Tom Smith (Australian footballer) (1873–1928), Australian rules footballer
- Tom Smith (American football) (born 1949), American football player
- Tom Smith (basketball) (born 1944), American college basketball coach
- Tom Smith (fencer) (1923–1995), Irish Olympic fencer

== Arts ==
- Tom Smith (filker), American singer-songwriter
- Tom Smith (make-up artist) (1920–2009), British make-up artist
- Tom Smith (Editors musician) (born 1981), lead singer of British rock band Editors
- Tom Smith (Christian musician) (born 1988), English Christian musician and worship leader
- Tom Smith (jazz musician), American jazz musician and educator
- Tom Smith (playwright) (born 1969), American playwright and theater director
- Tom Rob Smith (born 1979), British author
- Tom Smith (author), American business executive and author
- Tom Smith (artist) (born 1984), American-born abstract artist
- Tom Smith Jr. American guitarist, former guitarist for The Acacia Strain and A Wake in Providence

== Others ==
- Tom Smith (confectioner) (1823–1869), confectioner and inventor of the Christmas cracker
- Thomas J. Smith (lawman) (1830–1870), known as Tom "Bear River" Smith, American law officer
- Tom Smith (British politician) (1886–1953), British politician
- Tom Smith (Australian politician) (1890–1975), New South Wales politician
- Tom Smith (Queensland politician) (born 1990), Australian politician
- Tom Smith (Arizona politician) (1927–2014), Arizona politician
- Tom Smith (Kentucky politician), member of the Kentucky House of Representatives
- Tom Smith (politician, born 1938), member of the Kentucky Senate
- Tom Smith (Pennsylvania politician) (1947–2015), American businessman and political candidate
- Tom Smith (West Virginia politician), American highway engineer
- Tom Smith (trade unionist) (1905–1970), British trade union leader
- Tom Smith (engineer) (1927–2012), Grimsby-born British aerospace engineer

== See also ==
- Thomas Smith (disambiguation)
- Tommy Smith (disambiguation)
- Thomas Smyth (disambiguation)
