= Luigi Valentino Brugnatelli =

Italian chemist and inventor

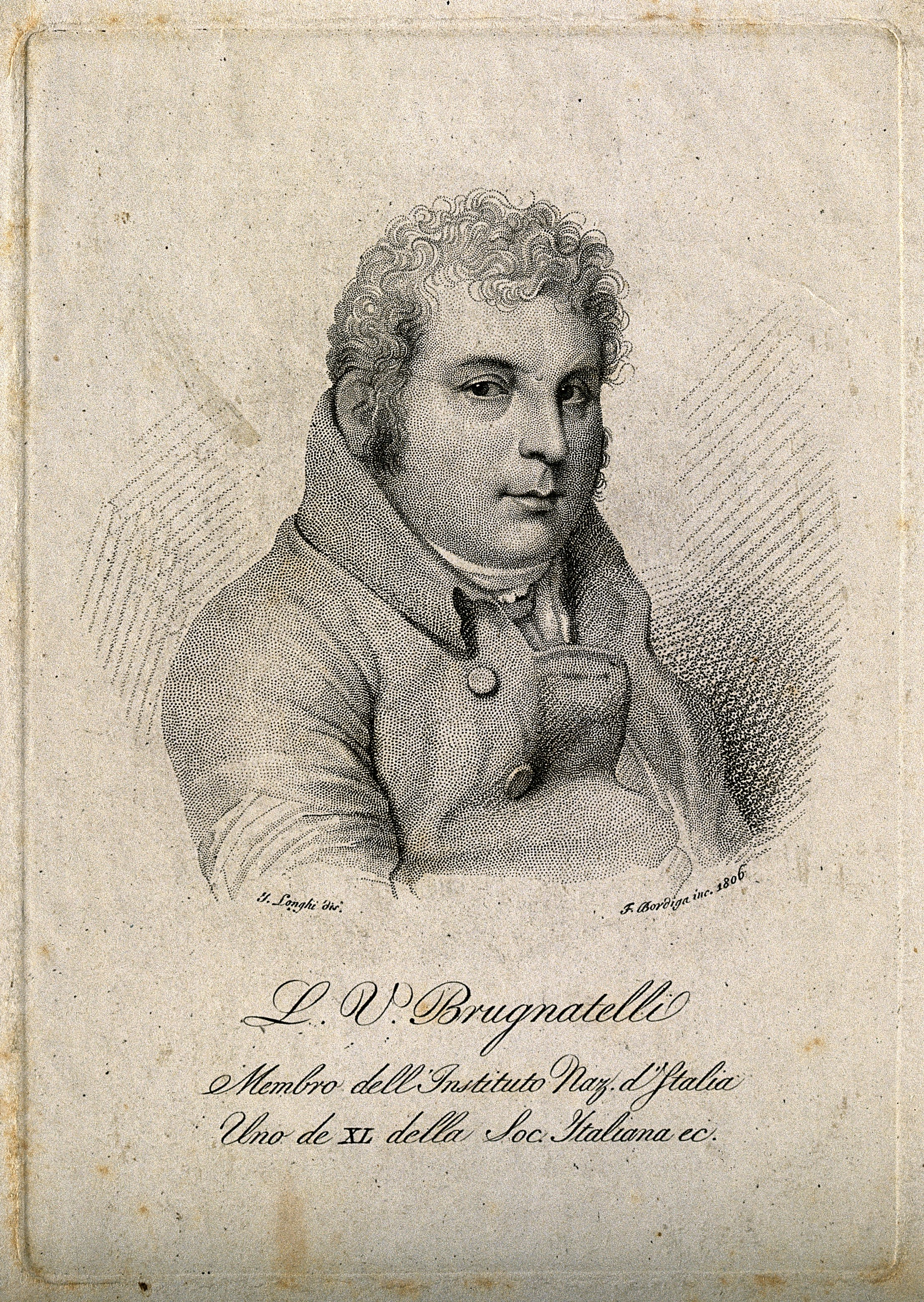
Luigi Valentino Brugnatelli

Luigi Valentino Brugnatelli (also Luigi Gaspare Brugnatelli or Luigi Vincenzo Brugnatelli) (14 February 1761 in Pavia – 24 October 1818 in Pavia) was an Italian chemist and inventor who discovered the process for electroplating in 1805.

== Early life ==
Born in Pavia, he attended the Pharmacy School created by Count Karl Joseph von Firmian at the University of Pavia where he was a pupil of Giovanni Antonio Scopoli who urged him to practice the medical profession, which he did without neglecting his interests in chemistry. Brugnatelli graduated in medicine in 1784 with a thesis on the chemical analysis of gastric juices. He was also a pupil of Lazzaro Spallanzani.

== Academic career and discoveries ==
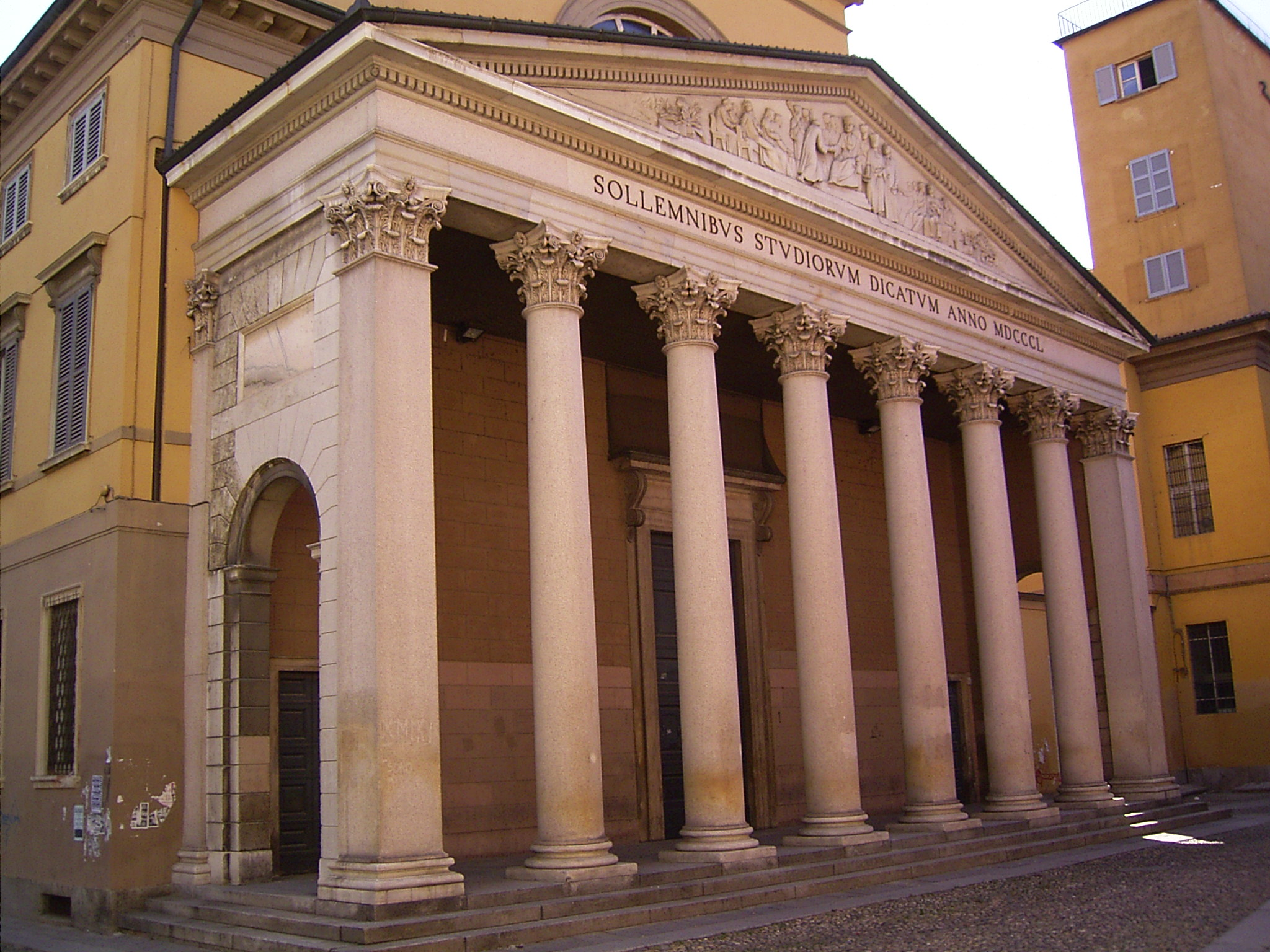
The Aula Magna at the University of Pavia - Brugnatelli taught here from 1796 to 1818

He occasionally taught at the University of Pavia where he became the head of chemistry teaching in 1796. In 1813 he became its Rector.

In 1798, Brugnatelli discovered the silver salt fulminic acid when he found that if silver was dissolved in nitric acid and the solution added to spirits of wine, a white, highly explosive powder was obtained. Decades later in 1860 this silver fulminate was used by the confectioner Tom Smith to give the 'snap' to his new novelty - the Christmas cracker. A personal friend of Alessandro Volta, Brugnatelli accompanied him to Paris in 1801 to illustrate the invention of the voltaic pile.

In 1802, Brugnatelli successfully carried out the first gilding electroplating experiments with the coating of carbon electrodes by a metallic film, finally refining the process in 1805 for which he used his colleague Volta's invention of five years earlier, the voltaic pile, to facilitate the first electrodeposition. He hypothesized that in the chemical pile there was also a transport of atoms, obtaining experimental evidence of this. He discovered the properties of coal cathodes as electrical conductors and succeeded in covering them with a metallic layer. He sensed the possible applications in the industrial field, sharing this procedure with a Pavese goldsmith, who used it.

Due to a dispute with Napoleon, Brugnatelli did not publish his inventions with the French Academy of Sciences (though he did publish elsewhere), and they did not become used in general industry for the following thirty-to-forty years. By 1839, scientists in Britain and Russia had independently devised metal-deposition processes similar to Brugnatelli's for the copper electroplating of printing press plates.

He was the first to adopt and make known in Italy the new theories and the new nomenclature introduced in chemistry by Antoine Lavoisier. He tried to introduce new concepts and new terminology (for example, instead of "lifeless" nitrogen he first proposed "light generator" and then "putrid" septone), but while these innovations gained some recognition even abroad they were ultimately not accepted.

In 1818, the year of his death, Brugnatelli was the first to prepare the compound alloxan, discovered by Justus von Liebig and Friedrich Wöhler.

An editorial entrepreneur, Brugnatelli played a very important role in stimulating scientific publications in Italy, helping to spread advanced knowledge of chemistry, physics and natural sciences.

Luigi Valentino Brugnatelli died in his native Pavia in 1818 aged 57.

== Publications ==
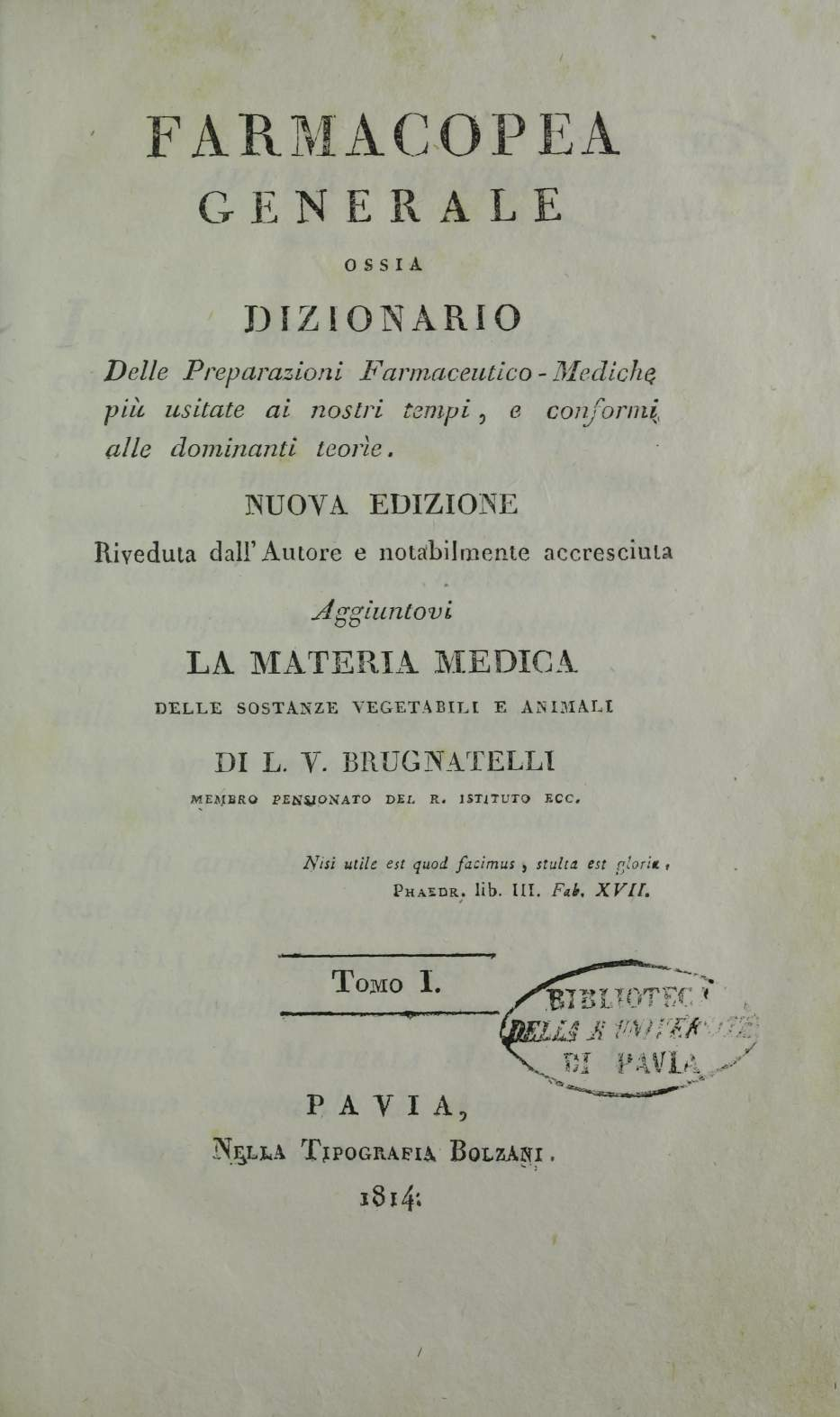
Farmacopea generale, 1814

In addition to numerous minor works he wrote the following books and scientific journals:

- Physical Library of Europe, 20 volumes, 1788 - 1791
- Annals of Chemistry, 22 volumes 1790 - 1805
- Physical-medical Journal, (in collaboration with Valeriano Luigi Brera ), 20 volumes, 1792 - 1796
- Medical Commentaries (in collaboration with Valeriano Luigi Brera ), 3 volumes, 1797
- Elements of Chemistry: supported by the most recent chemical and pharmaceutical discoveries (3 vols.), Pavia 1795-1798
- Journal of Physics, Chemistry and Natural History, continued until after his death, 1808 - 1827;
- Pharmacopoeia for use by apothecaries and modern doctors of the Italian Republic, Pavia 1802, trad. French: Pharmacopée générale, 2 volumes 1811
- Elementary Treatise on General Chemistry (four editions: 1795, 1801, 1803, 1810 ).
- Human Litilogy or Chemical and Medical Research. Posthumous work of Prof. LV Brugnatelli, published by Dr. Gaspare Brugnatelli. Pavia 1819.

=== Editions ===
- Elementi di chimica (in Italian). Vol. 1. Pavia: Bolzani. 1803.
  - Elementi di chimica (in Italian). Vol. 2. Pavia: Bolzani. 1803.
  - Elementi di chimica (in Italian). Vol. 3. Pavia: Bolzani. 1803.
  - Elementi di chimica (in Italian). Vol. 4. Pavia: Bolzani. 1803.
- Farmacopea generale (in Italian). Vol. 1. Pavia: Bolzani. 1814.
  - Farmacopea generale (in Italian). Vol. 2. Pavia: Bolzani. 1814.
  - Farmacopea generale (in Italian). Vol. 3. Pavia: Bolzani. 1814.
- Trattato elementare di chimica generale (in Italian). Vol. 1. Pavia: Bolzani. 1810.
  - Trattato elementare di chimica generale (in Italian). Vol. 2. Pavia: Bolzani. 1810.
  - Trattato elementare di chimica generale (in Italian). Vol. 3. Pavia: Bolzani. 1810.
  - Trattato elementare di chimica generale (in Italian). Vol. 4. Pavia: Bolzani. 1810.

== Bibliography ==
- U. Baldini, "Brugnatelli, Luigi Valentino", in Biographical Dictionary of Italians, vol. 14, Rome, 1972, pp. 494–496.
- Luigi Valentino Brugnatelli, Travel Diary in Switzerland and France with Alessandro Volta in 1801, edited by Alberto Gigli Berzolari, Bologna, Cisalpino, 1997 ("Sources and studies for the history of the University of Pavia" 28) - ISBN 8820507986
- A. Cattaneo, "Notes on the Life of LV Brugnatelli", Pharmacy Library - Chemistry - Physics - Medicine - Surgery - Therapeutic - Natural History, etc., Series 2, Volume 5 (January 1836), pp. III-XXIV
- Francesco Selmi, Handbook of the art of gilding and silvering with electro-chemical methods and simple immersion, compiled by F. Selmi on the writings and works of Brugnatelli, Boquillon, etc., Reggio Emilia, 1844.
