= Goswell =

Goswell may be a reference to:

- Goswell Road, a road in the London Borough of Islington; or
- Rachel Goswell, singer-songwriter and member of several bands including Slowdive.
