= Josiah Smith (clergyman) =

Josiah Smith (1704 – October 1781) was a clergyman in colonial South Carolina who championed the causes of the evangelical style of the Great Awakening and later American independence.

Smith was born in Charleston, South Carolina into a prominent family. His grandfather, Thomas, was a landgrave and governor of the province of South Carolina. He spent most of his childhood in Bermuda with his father. Josiah graduated from Harvard in 1725. He received his ordination in 1726, returned to Charleston, and was successively pastor of Presbyterian churches in Bermuda, Cainhoy, and Charleston, South Carolina. In 1730, he became involved in a theological dispute with Rev. Hugh Fisher of Dorchester, South Carolina on the subject of subscription to the Westminster Confession of Faith as well as the right of the individual to private judgment. Both Smith and Fisher published sermons concerning the dispute. In 1740, he championed the cause of George Whitefield and invited him to preach from his pulpit after he was refused admission to the local Episcopalian church. Given that Whitefield proved to be a controversial figure among various other clergy, Smith gave a sermon, which he had published, defending Whitefield's unusual and notorious preaching methods. In 1749, Smith had a stroke which left him unable to speak well; however, he continued to write and publish sermons.

Rev. Smith sided with the rebelling colonists in the American Revolution. During the Siege of Charleston, he was taken as a prisoner of war. He was later paroled, but ordered to Philadelphia where he died.

== Works ==
- Human Impositions Proved Unscriptural Or, The Divine Right of Private Judgment (1729)
- Solomon's Caution Against the Cup (1730)
- The Divine Right of Private Judgment Vindicated (1730)
- No New Thing to Be Slandered (1730)
- The Character and Preaching of Whitefield, impartially represented and supported (1740)
