= Tommy Smith =

Tommy Smith or Tommie Smith may refer to:

== Sports ==
=== Football ===
- Tommy L. Smith (1914–1985), Australian rules footballer
- Tommy Smith (footballer, born 1945) (1945–2019), English former international footballer, spent much of his career with Liverpool
- Tommy Smith (footballer, born 1959), English former footballer
- Tommy Smith (footballer, born 1980), English former footballer, most notably for Watford
- Tommy Smith (footballer, born 1990), New Zealand international footballer for Braintree Town
- Tommy Smith (footballer, born 1992), English former footballer for Middlesbrough
- Tommy Smith (footballer, born 2001), English footballer for Ipswich Town
- Tommy Smith (rugby union), 1978 rugby union winger for the USA national rugby squad, the American Cougars

=== Other sports ===
- Tommie Smith (born 1944), American track & field athlete, noted for Black Power salute at 1968 Olympics
- Tommy Smith (baseball) (born 1948), American baseball outfielder
- Tommy Smith (basketball) (born 1980), American basketball player
- Tommy Smith (ice hockey) (1886–1966), Canadian ice hockey forward
- Tommy Smith (jockey) (1937–2013), American jockey
- Tommy J. Smith (1916–1998), Australian trainer of racehorses
- Tommy Smith (racing driver) (born 2002), Australian racing driver

== Arts and entertainment ==
- Tommy Smith (playwright), American playwright
- Tommy Smith (DJ) (born 1954), radio disc jockey from Little Rock, Arkansas
- Tommy Smith (saxophonist) (born 1967), Scottish jazz saxophonist, composer and educator

== Others ==
- Tommie J. Smith, American convicted cop killer executed in Indiana

== See also ==
- Thomas Smith (disambiguation)
- Tom Smith (disambiguation)
- Thomas Smyth (disambiguation)
