= Pascoe Grenfell Hill =

Pascoe Grenfell Hill (1804–1882) was a priest in the Church of England and an author.

== Life ==
Hill, son of Major Thomas Hill, was born at Marazion, Cornwall, on 15 May 1804. He was educated at Mill Hill School, London, and at Trinity College, Dublin, where he graduated B.A. in 1836. In the same year he was ordained a priest, and became a chaplain in the Royal Navy, in which he served till 1845, when he was placed on the retired list.

During his service at sea he saw much of the slave trade on the African coast, of which he afterwards published an account in two works. An early publication, entitled 'Poems on Several Occasions' (chiefly love poems), was dedicated to his uncle, Oliver Hill, but in after years he repented of this production.

From 1852 to 1857 he was chaplain of the Westminster Hospital, and for some time morning reader at Westminster Abbey. On 26 January 1863 he was appointed rector of St. Edmund the King and Martyr with St. Nicholas Acons, Lombard Street, City of London, where he continued to his death. He endeavoured to enliven his church by providing a succession of preachers, by improving the choir, and holding short services in the middle of the day. He was the first to introduce a surpliced choir into a city church.

He died at the rectory house, 32 Finsbury Square, London, 28 Aug. 1882, and was buried in the City of London cemetery at Ilford. His wife, Ellen Annetta, whom he married 26 January 1846, died 18 April 1878.

== Works ==
1. 'Fifty Days on Board a Slave Ship in the Mozambique Channel,’ 1843; 3rd ed. 1853.
2. 'Poems on Several Occasions,’ Penzance, 1845.
3. 'A Voyage to the Slave Coasts of West and East Africa,’ 1849.
4. 'A Journey through Palestine,’ 1852.
5. 'The Kafir War,’ 1852.
6. 'A Visit to Cairo,’ 1853.
7. 'The Christian Soldier, a sermon,’ 1853.
8. 'Modern British Poesy, with Biographical Sketches,’ 1856.
9. 'Letter to the Lord Mayor on Street Slaughter,’ 1866.
10. 'Life of Napoleon,’ 3 vols. 1869.
