= Goswell Road =

Road in Islington and the City of London, England

Coordinates: 51.526970°N 0.100295°W

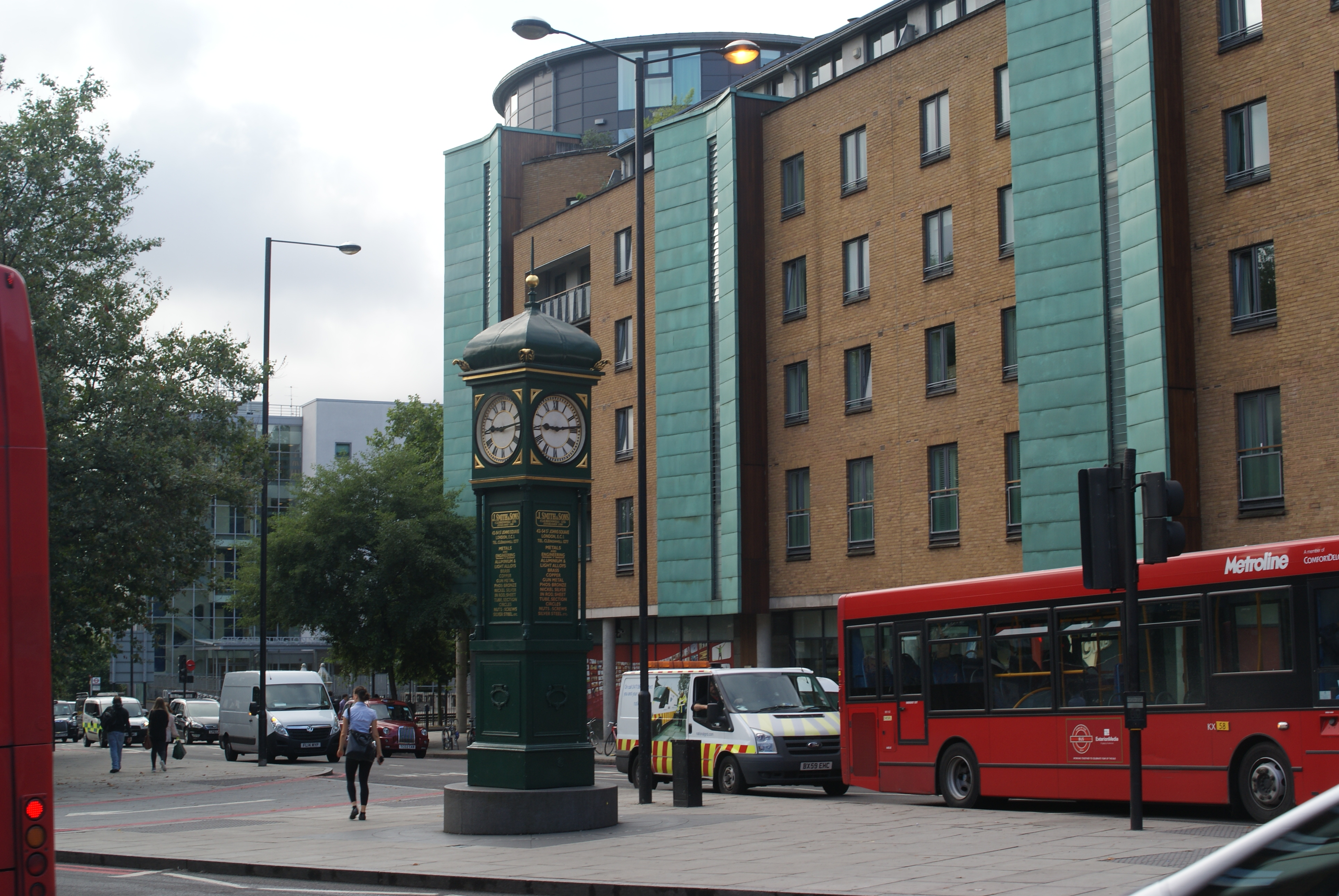
The Goswell Road clock

Goswell Road (historically Goswell Street), in Central London, is an end part of the A1. The southern part ends with one block, on the east side, in the City of London; the rest is in the London Borough of Islington, the north end being Angel. It crosses Old Street/Clerkenwell Road. In the north it splits Clerkenwell from Finsbury; the south was sometimes used as a demarcator but all but the southern corporate/legal/financial end in the modern era forms the heart of the highly developed mixed-use Barbican Estate.

All of the road is inside the London congestion charge zone. London Bus routes 4 and 56 serve the street.

== Notable premises ==
It is mostly fronted by offices and shops, else by some buildings of City University London. It also contains the central library of the Society of Genealogists, one of London's most important reference collections,

The main campus of the university centres takes up a set of back streets, many broad and pedestrianised, west, including the large semi-garden public square, Northampton Square.

DB Cargo UK's headquarters is a building that is a merger of numbers, № 310.

A shop of the road in the 1840s was the first shop of baker and confectioner Tom Smith (1823–1869) where he popularised, and may have "invented", the Christmas cracker.

== Toponymy ==
Some sources claim the road was named after the estate or garden written variously 'Goswelle' or 'Goderell' of (medieval noble) Robert de Ufford, 1st Earl of Suffolk; others single out 'Gos-wel' to be the meaningful phonemes and so posit a very local "God's Well" (a sacred well). The Roman founding of the city (Londinium) was in the pre-Christian years of the empire and it may have been multi-god before listed in Christian times. Until 1864 named generally Goswell Street, as in Charles Dickens' Pickwick Papers (in the novel, the protagonist Samuel Pickwick lodged there with Mrs. Bardell).

== New River ==
The New River low aqueduct ran along Goswell Road before turning to terminate at New River Head on Rosebery Avenue. Its course is locally culverted (underground).

== Dame Alice Owen's School bombing ==
On 15 October 1940, approximately 150 people were sheltering in the basement of Dame Alice Owen's School, then on Goswell Road. A large parachute mine squarely hit the building, causing majority-collapse and blocking access to the damaged basement. The blast wave from the bomb caused the New River culvert to rupture, flooding the shelter, drowning most survivors.

A memorial to the victims stands in Owen's Fields at the northern end of Goswell Road.

== Gallery ==
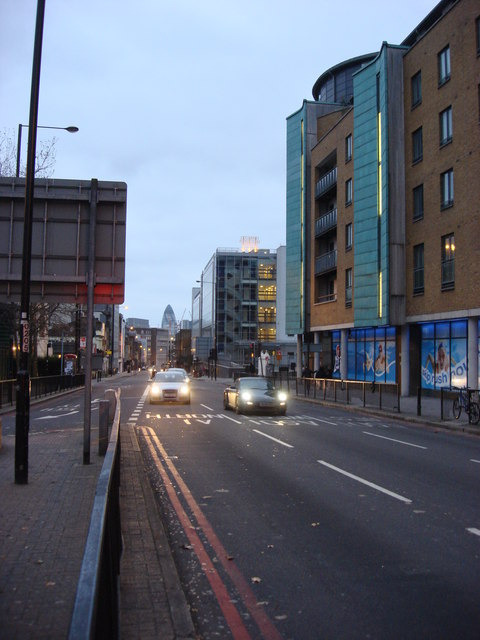
Goswell Road from Upper Street

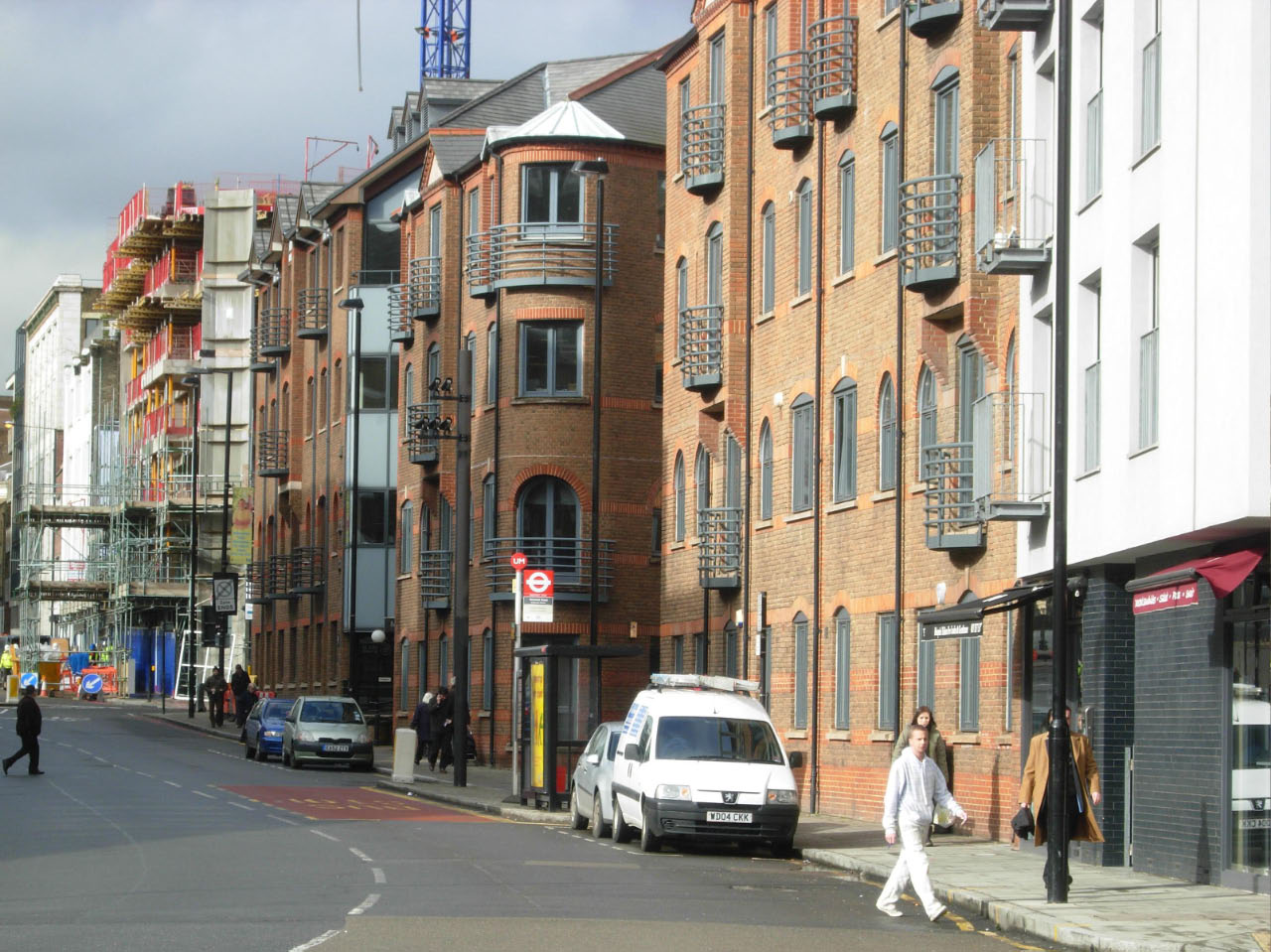
Goswell Road, DB Cargo UK office

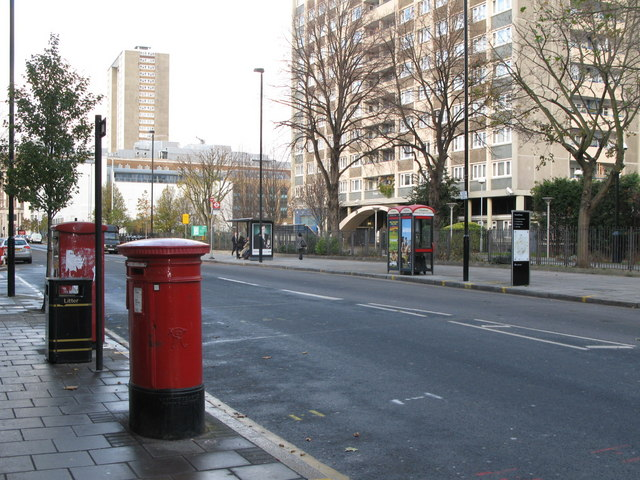
Goswell Road

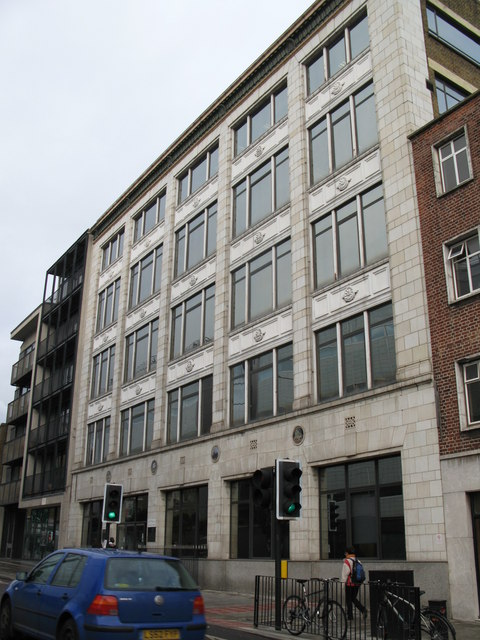
Goswell Road, Angel House

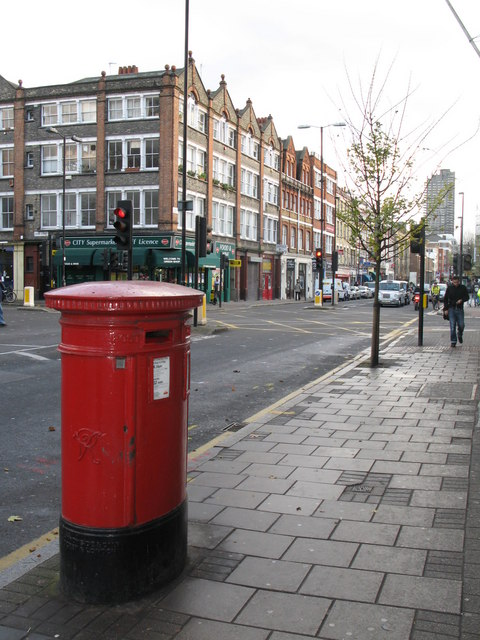
Goswell Road - Percival Street, EC1

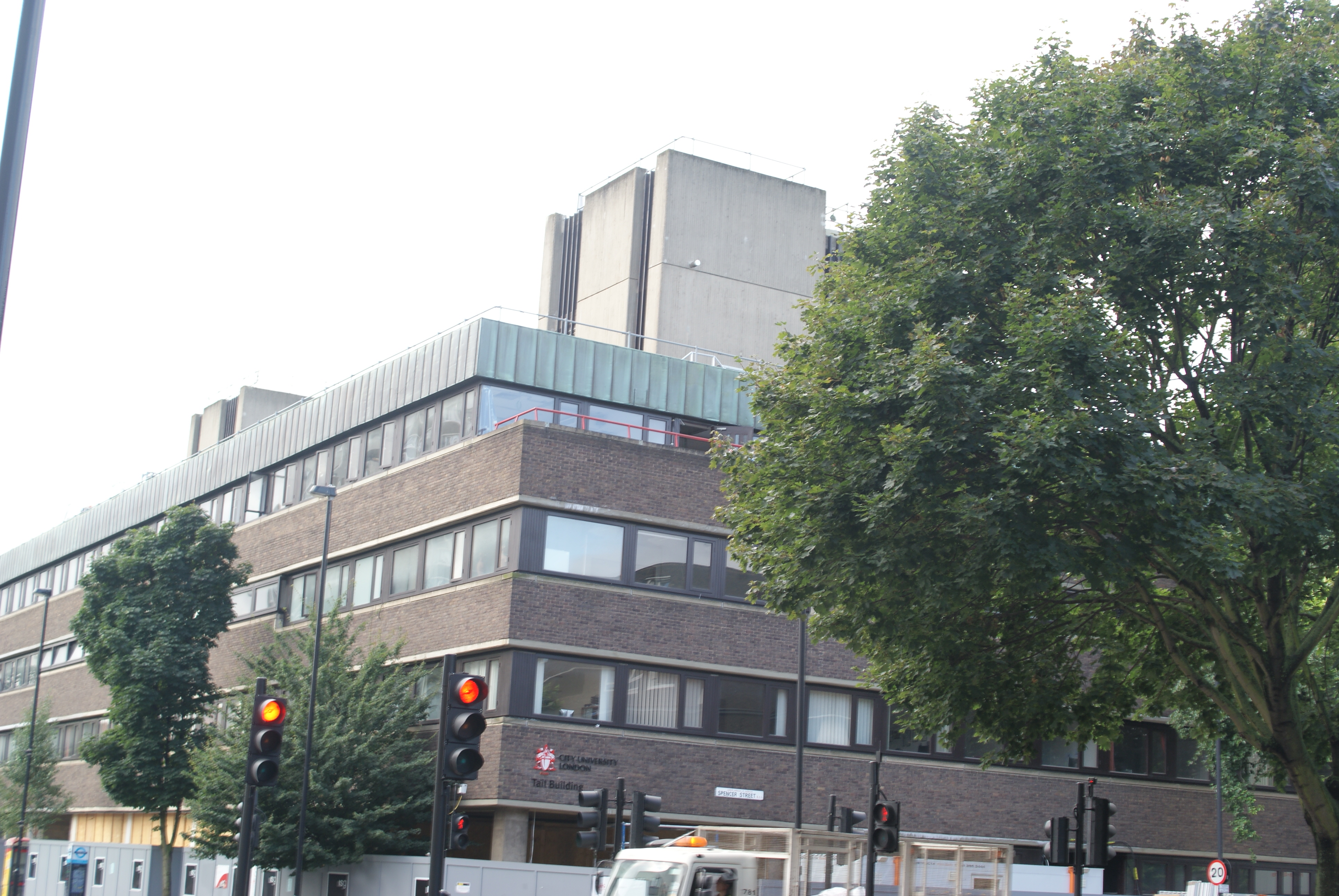
Goswell Road, City University

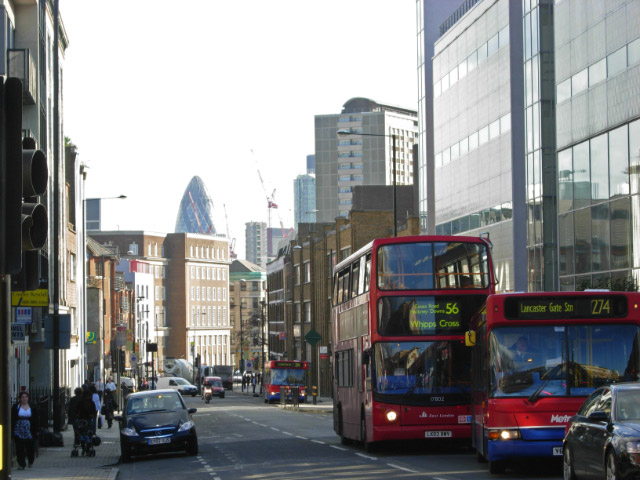
Goswell Road, towards the City

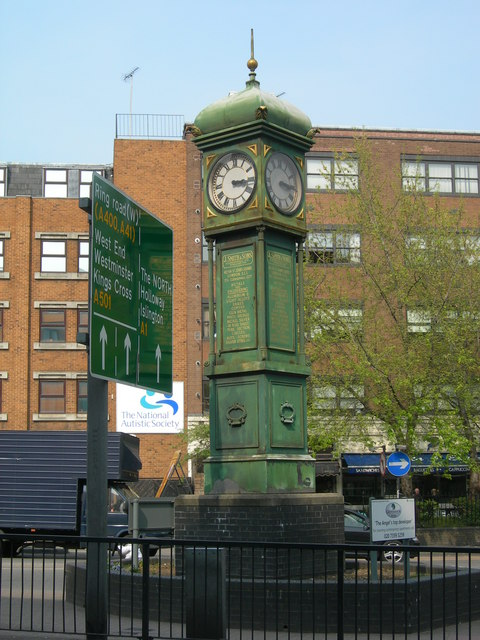
Goswell Road clock tower
