= Thomas Smythe (disambiguation) =

Thomas Smythe (c. 1558 – 1625) was an English merchant and politician.

Thomas Smythe may also refer to:

- Thomas Smythe (customer) (1522–1591), the former's father, and English collector of customs duties
- Sir Thomas Smyth, 2nd Baronet (died 1732), British Army officer and politician
- Thomas Smythe, 1st Viscount Strangford (1599–1635), viscount in the Peerage of England
- Thomas Smythe (artist), (1825–1906) English artist based in Suffolk

== See also ==
- Thomas Smith (disambiguation)
- Thomas Smyth (disambiguation)
