= Finsbury Square =

Urban square in Finsbury, central London, England

Coordinates: 51°31′15″N 0°05′11″W

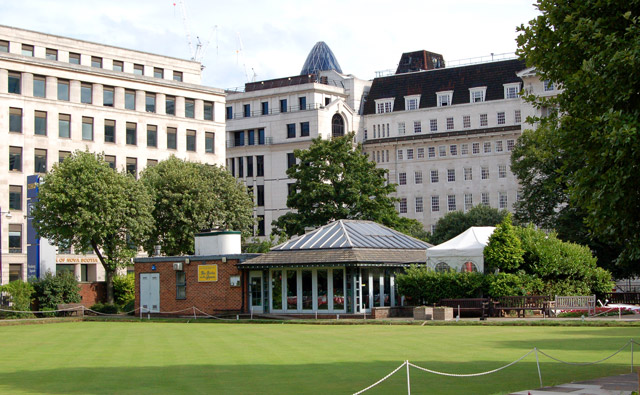
Finsbury Square, looking south-east

Finsbury Square is a 0.7-hectare (1.7-acre) square in Finsbury in central London which includes a six-rink grass bowling green. It was developed in 1777 on the site of a previous area of green space to the north of the City of London known as Finsbury Fields, in the parish of St Luke's and near Moorfields. It is sited on the east side of City Road, opposite the east side of Bunhill Fields. It is approximately 200m north of Moorgate station, 300m north-west of Liverpool Street station and 400m south of Old Street station. Nearby locations are Finsbury Circus and Finsbury Pavement. Named after it, but several miles away, are Finsbury Park and its eponymous neighbourhood. The centre of the square includes an underground NCP Car Park and two disused petrol stations, also owned by NCP for above-ground commercial parking. Finsbury Square is served by bus routes 21, 43, 141 and 214.

== History ==
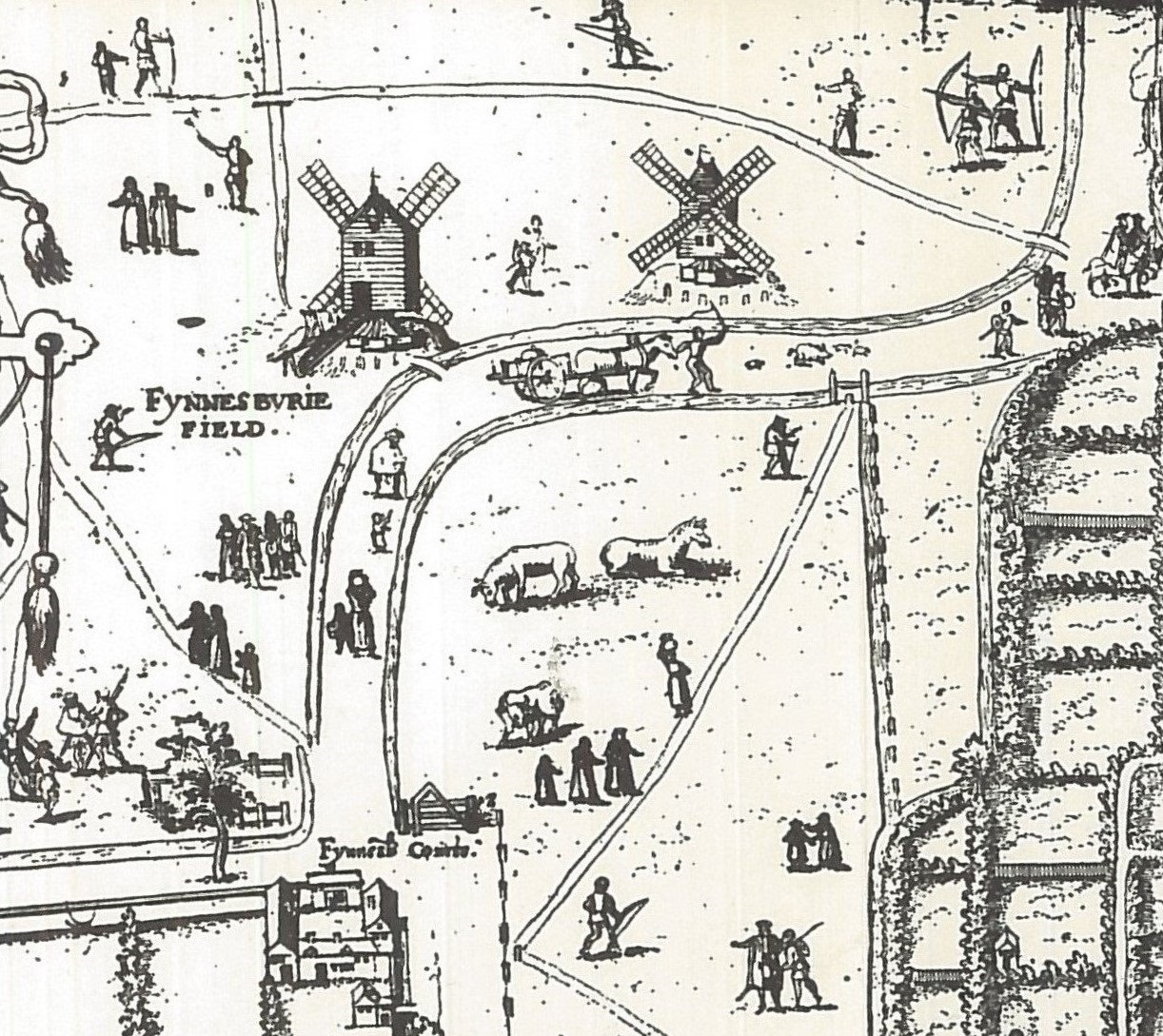
"Fynnesburie Field" on the "Copperplate" map of London of the 1550s

In 1777 Finsbury Square was laid out as a planned quadrangle of terraced town houses surrounding a central garden. Beginning in the late 19th century, the houses began to be demolished to make way for large-scale commercial properties.

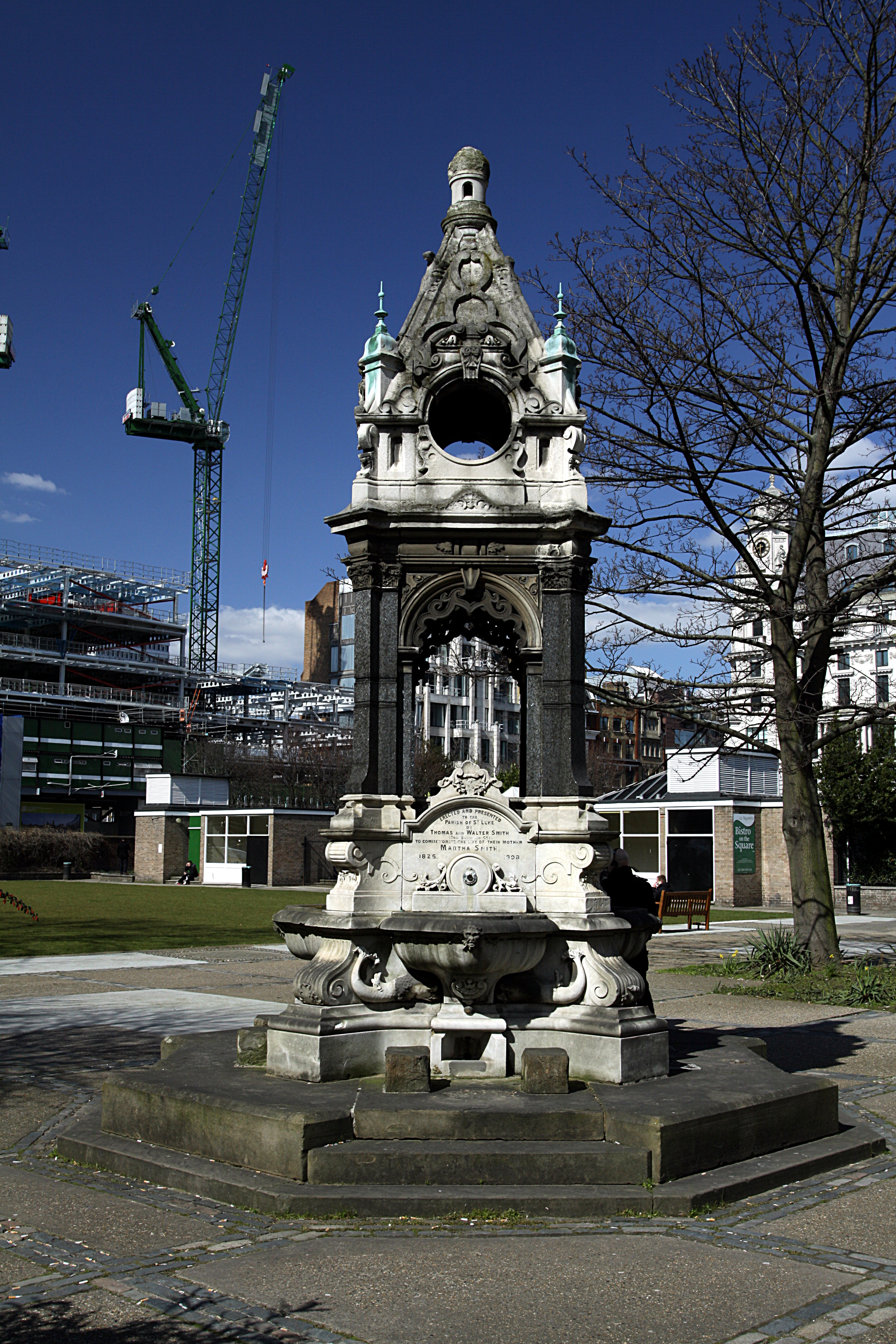
Drinking fountain on Finsbury Square, commemorating Martha Smith, wife of Tom Smith, inventor of the Christmas cracker

Past residents of the square include Pascoe Grenfell Hill, Thomas Southwood Smith and Philip Henry Pye-Smith. It has also been the site of the Temple of the Muses, the bookshop of James Lackington and the first home of the rabbinical seminary that became the London School of Jewish Studies (1855–81), of the Greek Orthodox Church of Saint Sophia and of the Roman Catholic Church of St Mary Moorfields (1820–1900).

From 1907 to 1914, 39 Finsbury Square was the home of the City of London Yeomanry. The site is now occupied by City Gate House which was designed by Frederick Gould and Giles Gilbert Scott and completed in 1930.

In 1784, Vincenzo Lunardi achieved the first successful hot air balloon flight in England from the adjacent Artillery Ground.

The south side of the square was known as Sodomites Walk in the 18th century and was notorious as a gay cruising area.

On 22 October 2011, Occupy London protesters began to camp on the square. They were subsequently removed in an eviction described by the council as 'peaceful and low key'.

In January 2013, the University of Liverpool announced that its London Campus would be at 33 Finsbury Square.

Also in 2013 a memorial was installed at the SW of the square commemorating those who died in the 1975 Moorgate tube crash.

== Today ==
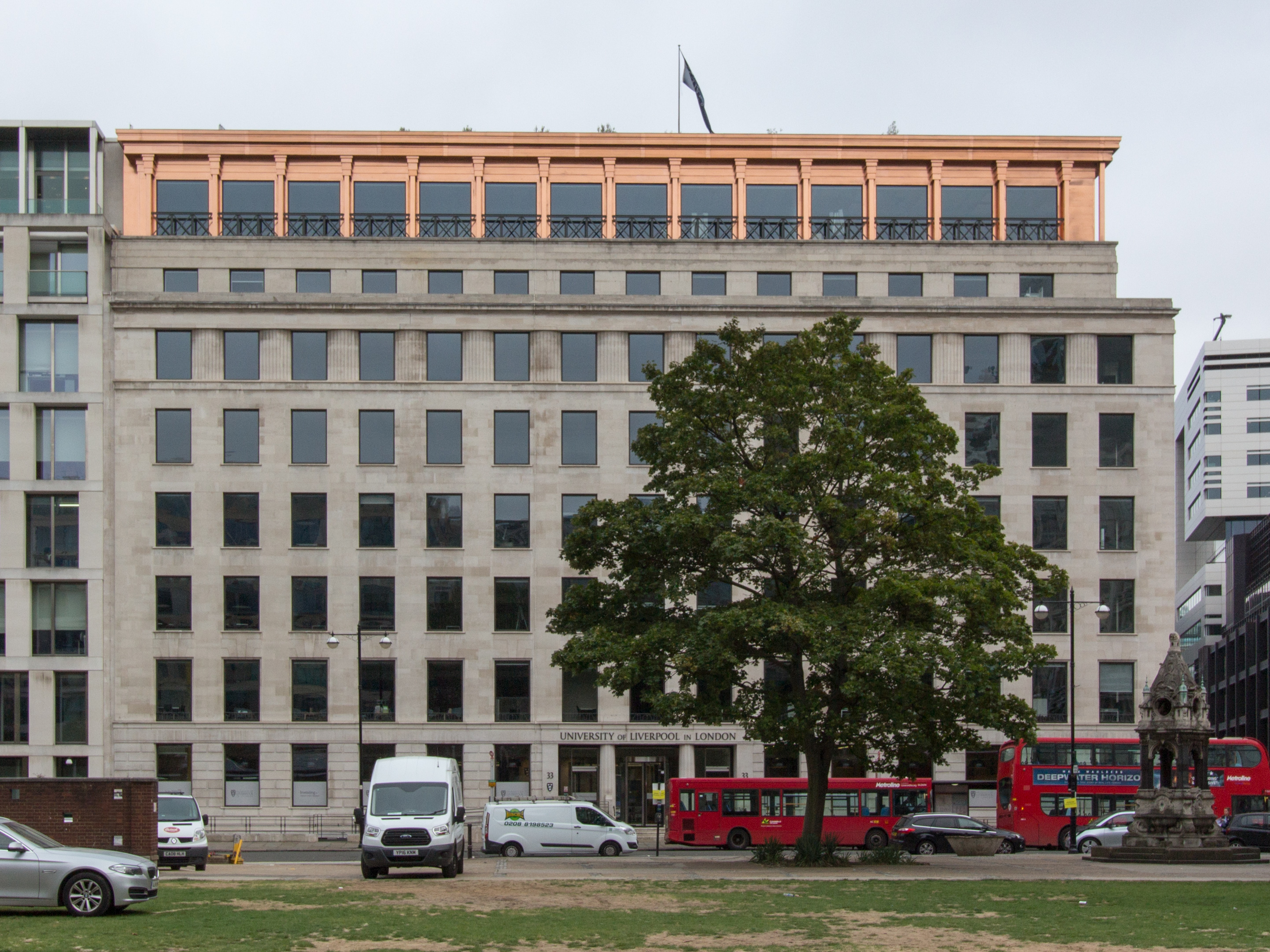
University of Liverpool in London, 33 Finsbury Square

On the west side of the square, 10 Finsbury Square is a 150,000 sq ft office building built in 2014. It is occupied by the London Metal Exchange.

The north side of the square is largely occupied by Triton Court at 14–18 Finsbury Square, a steel-frame constructed office building originally built during the first three decades of the twentieth century, along with Royal London House (22–25 Finsbury Square) which dates from the 1950s.

The east of the square is occupied by Grant Thornton accountants and auditors at 30 Finsbury Square, and the University of Liverpool in London at 33 Finsbury Square. In November 2019, City, University of London announced that it had acquired 33 Finsbury Square on a lease. The university's Bayes Business School (formerly Cass Business School) will occupy the building, as well as significantly remodelling its Bunhill Row campus.

The south of the square is City Gate House, 39–45 Finsbury Square.

Finsbury Square is also the venue for an occasional farmers' market.

=== Royal London House and Triton Court ===
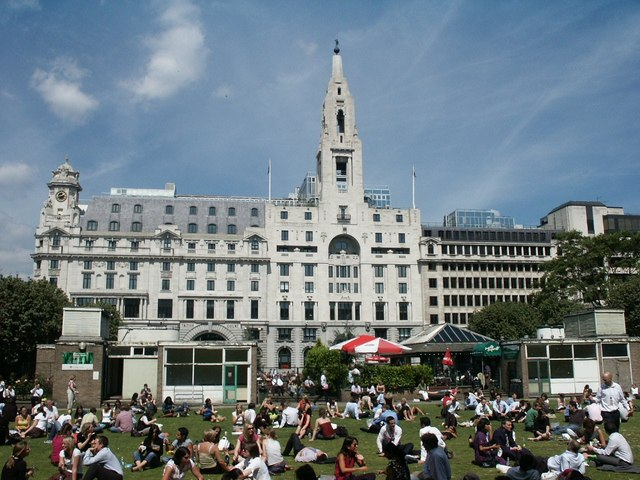
Finsbury Square, looking north.

The buildings on the north side of the square were built over the first half of the twentieth century to serve as headquarters for what is now the Royal London Group; collectively they were known as Royal London House. The oldest (westernmost) section (with its cupola and clock on the corner with City Road) dates from 1904 to 1905 and was built by John Belcher as headquarters for the Royal London Friendly Society; over the next ten years this building was extended eastwards by four bays. The adjacent, taller section, with its prominent tower-cum-spire, dates from 1929 to 1930; it was built by Belcher's former partner, J. J. Joass, to form an expanded headquarters for the Royal London Mutual Assurance Society. (A contemporary extension to the north of the Edwardian block was also built by Joass.) Finally, the whole complex was extended eastwards again in the 1950s with the addition of a block by the architect H. Bramhill.

In the 1980s, the older (pre-1940s) buildings were all comprehensively redeveloped, by Sheppard Robson & Partners, to form a new office complex: Triton Court. The interiors were gutted and rebuilt, but the façades were retained, albeit with the addition of a double-height mansard roof and the insertion of a new entrance arch through the four-bay extension to the original Edwardian block. These are now the only remaining pre-World War II buildings in the square. After the completion of Triton Court, the 1950s block alone was left with the designation Royal London House.

In 2013–15, Triton Court was developed by Resolution Property into Alphabeta, a 220,000 sq ft office block. This was sold to Indonesian real estate conglomerate Sinar Mas Land in 2015.

At around the same time the 1950s block, Royal London House, was converted into The Montcalm Hotel (completed in 2016).
