= Thomas Smith (landgrave) =

South Carolina Landgrave

Thomas Smith II Landgrave
- Portrait of Thomas Smith II, circa 1700

Baron of Wiskinboo & Winyah

Landgrave of the Province of Carolina
- In office 1694–1738
- Monarchs: William III; Queen Anne; George I George II

Deputy in the Governors Council of the Province of Carolina
- In office c.1694–c.1715

Judge of the Berkeley County Court
- In office c.1693–c.1700

Personal details
- Born: 1670 Exeter, Devon, Kingdom of England
- Died: May 9, 1739 (aged 68–69) Goose Creek, Berkeley County, Province of South Carolina
- Resting place: Yeamans Hall, Goose Creek, Berkeley County, South Carolina
- Spouse(s): Anna Van Myddagh; Mary Hyrne
- Children: 20
- Parent: Thomas Smith
- Occupation: Politician; Judge; Landgrave; Planter class

Thomas Smith II (1670 – May 9, 1739) was an English-American slave-trader, judge, baron, landgrave, cacique, planter, and merchant who was one of the most prominent men in early colonial South Carolina. His father was governor Thomas Smith and he inherited his titles from him.

== Early life and family ==
Thomas Smith was born in Exeter, England to Thomas Smith and Barbara Atkins. His father was the 1st Baron of Wiskinboo and Governor of South Carolina. He was the great-grandson of Nicholas Smith and the great-great-grandson of George Smith. He arrived with the rest of his family around 1684. He inherited his fathers land and titles upon his death in 1694.

== Landgrave system and baronies ==
Smith belonged to the semi-feudal aristocratic structure of the colony. He owned approximately 48,000 acres of land and held the titles of cacique and landgrave. He expanded the holdings he inherited from his father considerably, by purchasing the Winyah Barony from Robert Daniell in 1711, which was around 24,000 acres of land near what is today Georgetown, South Carolina, making him today, the baron of what is today Moncks Corner and Georgetown.

== Slaveholding and slave trading ==
Smith was one of the most significant slave owners of the time in South Carolina, with records showing him owning hundreds of enslaved individuals across several plantations. His plantations were mainly producing rice which Smith exported and made a fortune off of, making him one of the colony's wealthiest men.

== Political and legal career ==
In addition to his business ventures, Smith played an important role in the political spheres of colonial South Carolina. He served as a judge in Berkeley County and as a member of the Governors Council. This role was as advisor and councilmen to the Governor, an important role that was appointed by the lord proprietors.

== Later life and descendants ==
Thomas Smith's influence fell after the Revolution of 1719 and the end of proprietary rule. While it didn't strip him of his wealth, his status as a noble was all but taken away as it had not real backing anymore. He died in 1739 at the age of 68 or 69. His daughter Anne, married Benjamin Waring II. His notable descendants are Benjamin Smith (slave trader), James H. Ladson, Sarah Reeve Ladson, Morton Waring, and Ursula von der Leyen.
