= Waring family =

American political family

The Waring family is an American family that held political positions and served in several wars in several states, primarily South Carolina, between the 17th century and the present. The first members of the family came to South Carolina and Virginia in the 17th century from London, with Benjamin Waring being the first generation of the family in North America. Later generations of the family would migrate into Georgia, North Carolina, Florida, Alabama, and Tennessee.

== Benjamin Robert Waring I ==
Major Benjamin Robert Waring I (1655–1713) was an English-American immigrant to South Carolina in the 16th century. He held several representative roles in the political structure of colonial South Carolina.

== Benjamin Robert Waring II ==
Colonel Benjamin Robert Waring II (1686–1739) was an American politician who served in the South Carolina House of Commons in 1720. He married Anne Smith, a daughter of Landgrave Thomas Smith II.

== Benjamin Robert Waring IV ==
Benjamin Robert Waring IV (1741–1811) was an American mill owner and veteran of the American Revolutionary War, serving as a captain under Francis Marion. He later owned a mill in Columbia, South Carolina.

== Morton Alexander Waring ==
Colonel Morton Alexander Waring (1783–1863) was an American lawyer, marshal, and slave trader, who was the son-in-law of Paul Hamilton. He served as Commissioner of Loans of South Carolina in 1813 and was a partner of Jervey, Waring & White, where he helped facilitate The Great Charleston Slave Sale.

== William Richard Waring ==
William Richard Waring (1787–1843) was a 19th-century American medical doctor. He was described as one of the "most illustrious physicians" in Savannah, Georgia. The William Waring Property is named for him.

== Joseph Frederick Waring ==
Colonel Joseph Frederick Waring (1832–1876) was an American veteran of the American Civil War, serving at the Battle of Gettysburg and the Battle of Trevilian Station.

== Julius Waties Waring ==
Julius Waties Waring was an American judge appointed by Franklin D. Roosevelt in 1942. He ruled on several race-based cases including Duvall v. School Board, and Briggs v. Elliot. He died in New York City in 1968.
