= Thomas Smith (archdeacon) =

Anglican archdeacon in early 20th century New Zealand

Thomas James Smith was an Anglican priest in the last decade of the nineteenth century and the opening decades of the twentieth.

Smith was ordained deacon in 1899, and priest in 1901. After curacies in Blenheim and Greytown he held incumbencies at Picton, Amuri, Wakefield and Nelson. He was Archdeacon of Waimea from 1932 until 1940; and Archdeacon of Māwhera from 1940 to 1955.
