= Thomas Smith (Queensland cricketer) =

Australian cricketer

Thomas Henry Smith (19 September 1898 – 6 March 1926) was an Australian cricketer. He was a left-handed batman who played for Queensland. He was born in Talgai and died in Warwick.

Smith made a single appearance in each season between 1921–22 and 1923–24, scoring 61 runs in 6 innings, including a top score of 21 runs in his second first-class innings.

Smith died at the age of just 27 in Queensland.
