= Tom Smith (confectioner) =

Christmas cracker retailer (1823–1869)

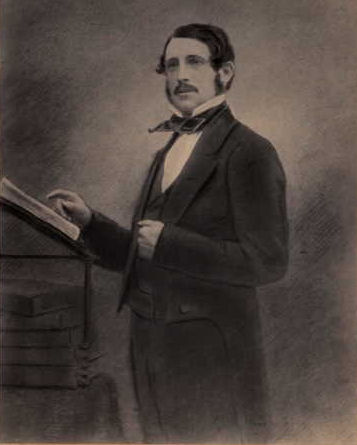
Tom Smith c. 1869

Thomas Smith (18 October 1823 – 13 March 1869) was a British baker and confectioner who is traditionally described as the inventor of the Christmas cracker, in 1847.

== Early life ==
Thomas Smith was born in Newington, then in Surrey, in 1823, the son of Priscilla (née Flight; 1787–1873) and Thomas Bruce Smith (1798–1860), a grocer. In 1830, the 7 year-old Tom Smith began work in a baker and ornamental confectioners shop in London. Over the years as an apprentice he learned his trade until he became a master in his craft, experimenting with new designs and ideas in his spare time. Smith opened his first shop in Goswell Road in Clerkenwell in the 1840s where he baked wedding cakes and confectionery on the premises. When Smith went to Paris in 1846, he came across the French 'bonbon', a sugared almond wrapped in a twist of tissue paper. Taking the idea back to London Smith's take on the bonbon proved to be very popular, particularly at Christmas time.

== The Christmas Cracker ==
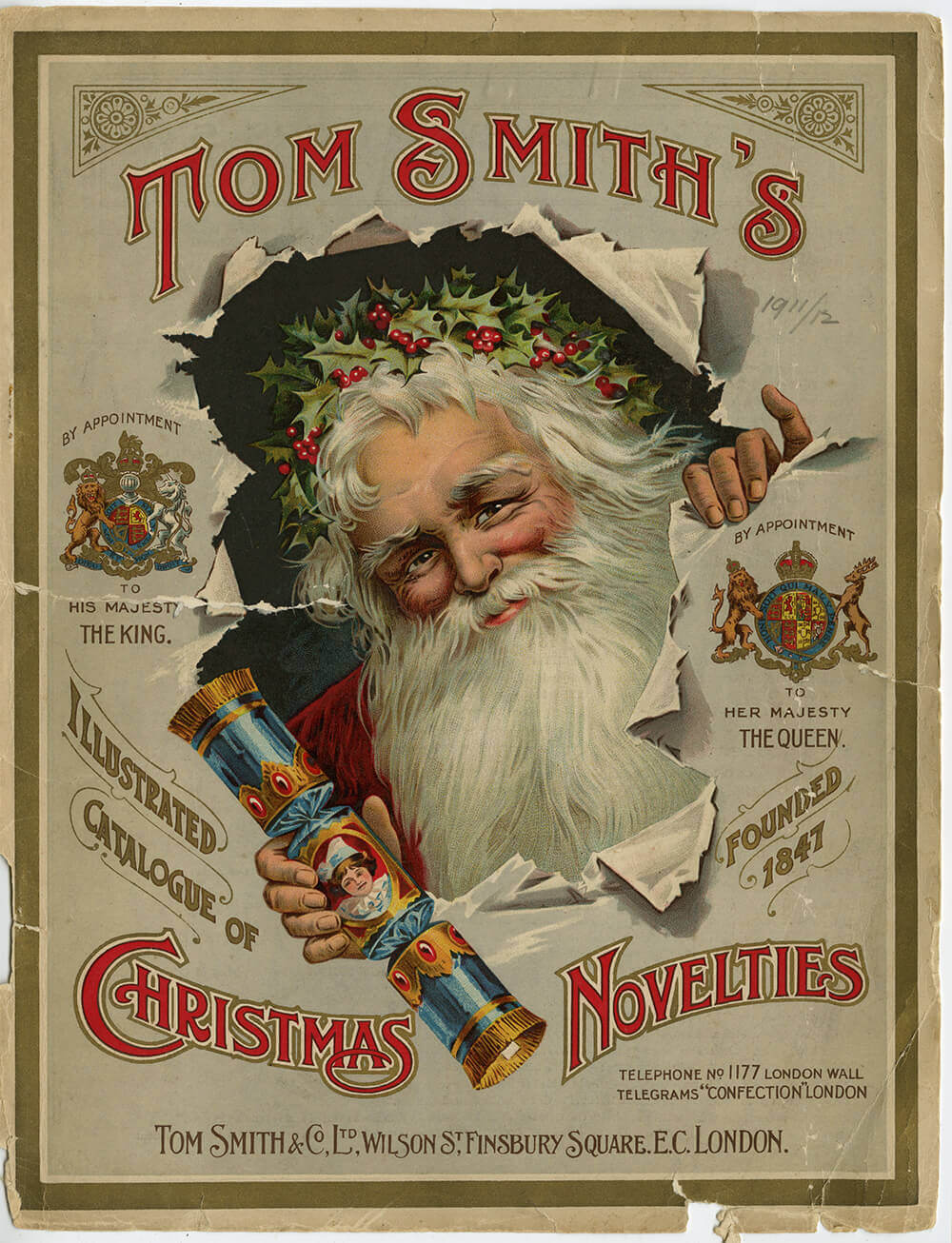
Catalogue for Tom Smith's Christmas Novelties from 1911

As interest in his bonbons began to wane Smith had to come up with new ideas to promote sales. His first idea was to include love messages in the wrappers of the sweets in a similar way to that found in fortune cookies. In 1849 Smith replaced the bonbon with such items as fans, jewellery and trinkets. In 1860 Smith added the 'snap' element, the myth being that he added this when he heard the crackle of a log on a fire. In reality 'Waterloo Crackers' as they were sometimes called had been around for decades by 1860 after the discovery of silver fulminate by the chemist Edward Charles Howard in 1800 and its further development by Luigi Valentino Brugnatelli in 1802 of a safe way of using it in amusements and for practical jokes. Smith bought the design and formula for the "snap" in his crackers from a chemist called Tom Brown who had worked for the Brocks Fireworks company.

The size of the hand-made paper wrapper had to be increased to take the banger strip, and at first Smith named his creation the Bangs of Expectation and later as the Cosaque (French for Cossack); but the onomatopoeic "cracker" quickly became a more popular name and served to distinguish Smith's product from that of his competitors. In the 1861 Census Tom Smith is listed as living at Brontë Cottage in Hampstead and described himself as a "manufacturing confectioner employing 7 men and 16 women".

Walter Smith, one of the three sons of Tom Smith who took over the running of the company after his death, originated the idea of the cracker as we know it today; it was he who decided to include the gifts and paper hats that then differentiated the Tom Smith cracker from that of their competitors. Walter Smith sourced the gifts for inside the crackers from across Europe, America and Japan. By the 1890s sales of crackers were so successful that the company was employing 2,000 staff, many of whom were women, and was able to relocate to larger premises in Finsbury Square. In 1953 Tom Smith & Company merged with Caley Crackers.

== Family ==
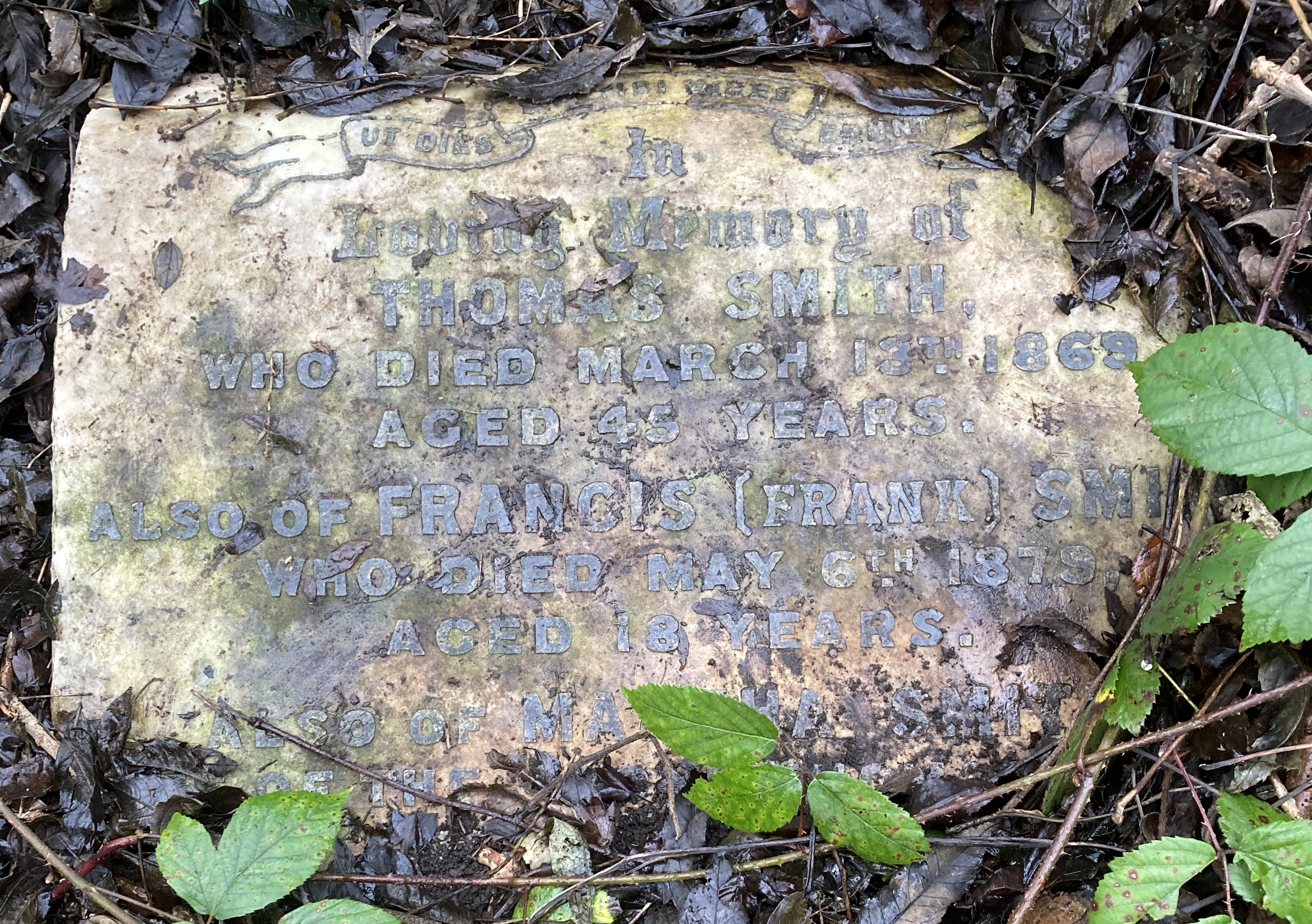
Grave of Tom Smith in Highgate Cemetery

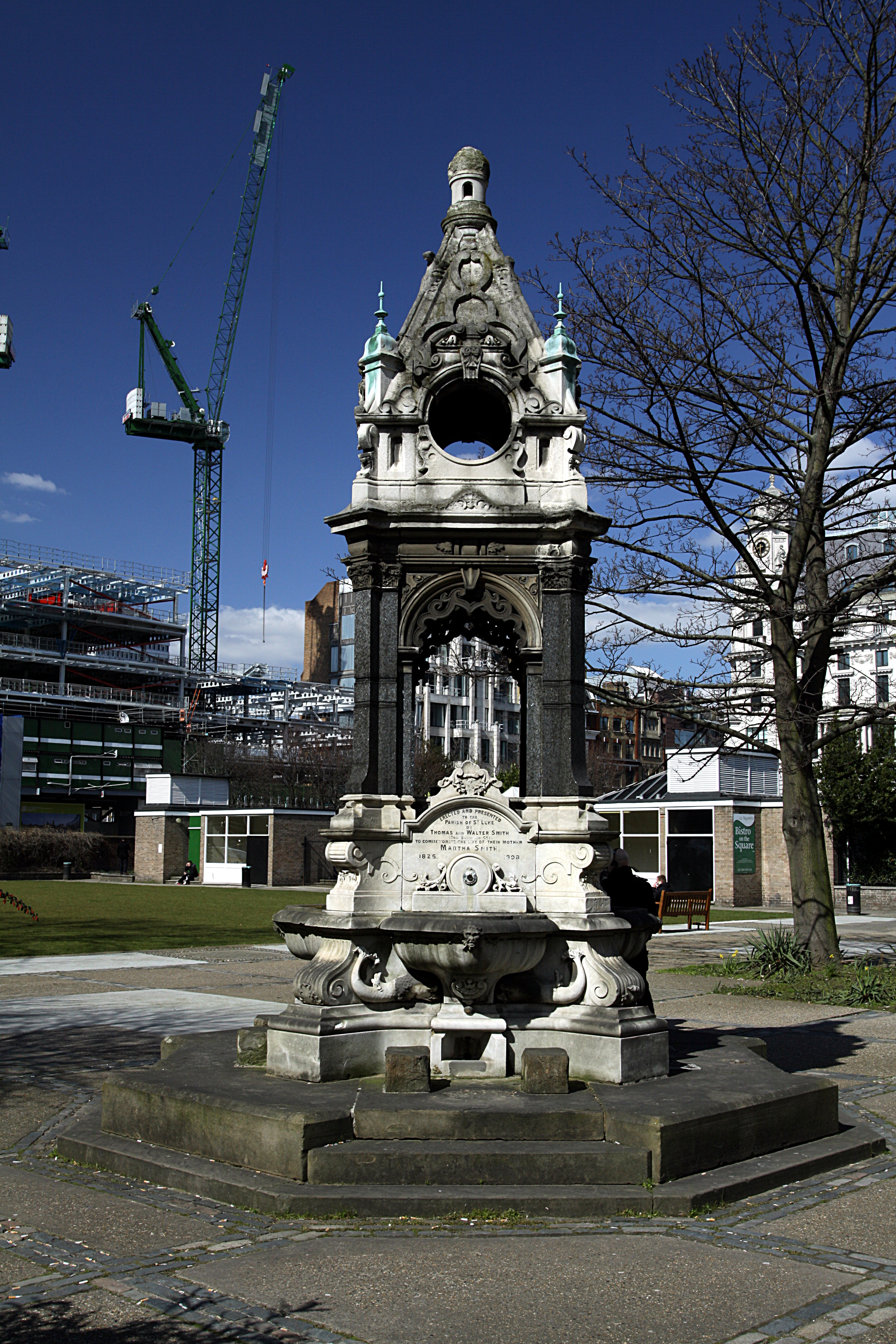
Drinking fountain on Finsbury Square, commemorating Tom Smith, inventor of the Christmas cracker and his family

Smith married Martha née Hunt (1826–1898) in London in 1848 and with her had seven children: Thomas Smith (1849–1928); Henry John Smith (1850–1889); John Smith (1852–1853); Walter Smith (1854–1923); twins Emanuel Smith (1857–1857) and Martha Smith (1857–1939); Priscella Smith (1858–1929), and Francis (Frank) Smith (1860–1878). His three sons Walter, Henry and Thomas Jnr. succeeded him in running the business.

Tom Smith died at his home at 320 City Road aged 46 in 1869 from stomach cancer and is buried in Highgate Cemetery in London.

== Legacy ==
A memorial water fountain to Tom Smith and his family stands in Finsbury Square, London.
