= George Smith (MP for Exeter) =

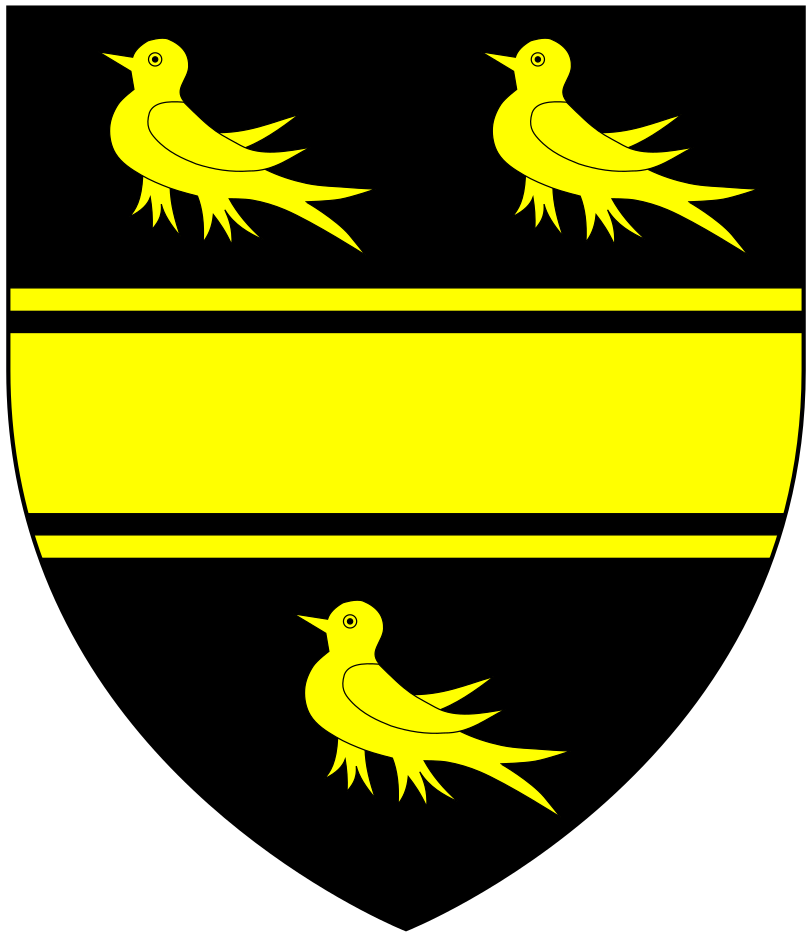
Arms of Smith of Exeter: Sable, a fess cotised between three martlets or

Sir George Smith (died 21 March 1619) of Madworthy-juxta-Exeter and Madford House, Exeter, Devon, was a merchant who served as MP for Exeter in 1604, was three times Mayor of Exeter and was Exeter's richest citizen, possessing 25 manors. He was the grandfather of George Monck, 1st Duke of Albemarle (1608–1670) KG and of John Grenville, 1st Earl of Bath (1628–1701).

== Origins ==
He was the eldest son of John Smith (died pre 1581) of Borage (or Burridge), near Tiverton, a merchant who served as Sheriff of Exeter in 1565 and Mayor of Exeter in 1567/8, by his wife Alice Muttleberry, daughter of Alexander Muttleberry of Jordans, Somerset.

== Career ==
He rebuilt his Exeter townhouse in 1584 at a cost of £1,000. His mercantile activities included dealing in tin, a noted product of Cornwall, and he invested in the colonizing voyage to North America undertaken by Sir Humphrey Gilbert in 1583.

He was Sheriff of Exeter for 1583–84 and Mayor of Exeter for 1586–87, 1597–98 and 1607–08. He was knighted at Greenwich on 12 June 1604.

== Marriages and children ==
George Smith married twice:

- Firstly on 30 September 1572 to Joan Walker (died post 1587), daughter of James Walker of Exeter, descended from the Mathew family of Wales. By Joan he had the following children:
  - Sir Nicholas Smith of Larkbeare, Devon, who married Dorothea Horsey, daughter of Sir Raphe Horsey of Dorset, by whom he left male issue
  - Thomas Smith (governor of South Carolina)
  - Elizabeth Smith, wife of Sir Thomas Monk (1570–1627) of Potheridge, Devon, MP for Camelford in 1626. Their second son was George Monck, 1st Duke of Albemarle (1608–1670) KG
  - Jane Smith, wife of Richard Hening of Dorset.
- Secondly in 1598 to Grace Viell (d.1645), widow of Peter Bevill of Killigarth, Cornwall and daughter and co-heiress of William Viell of Trevorder, Cornwall by his wife Jane Arundell, daughter of Sir John Arundell of Trerice, Cornwall. By Grace he had one daughter:
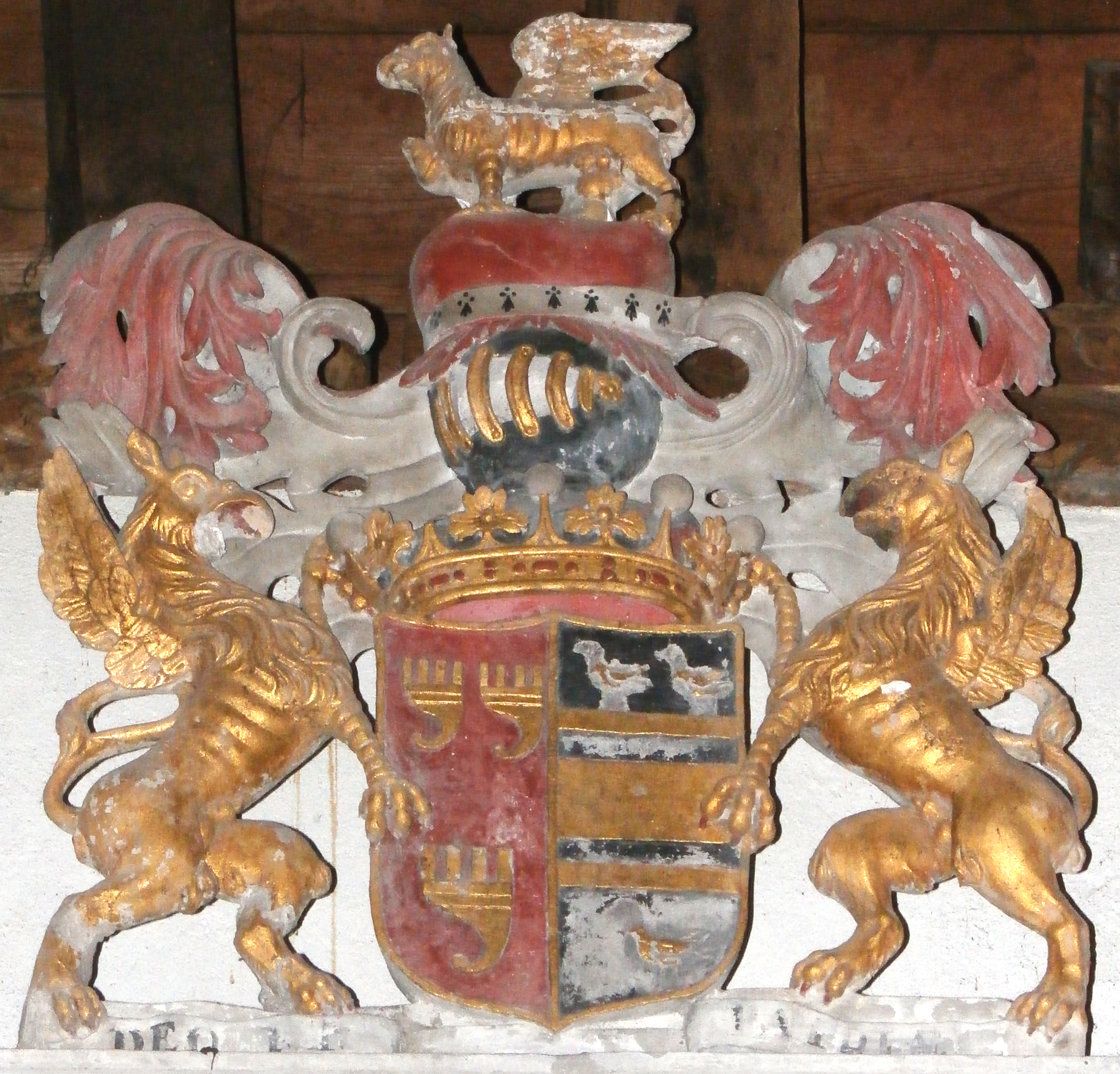
  Heraldic achievement of Sir Bevil Grenville atop his monument in Kilkhampton Church, displaying arms of Grenville (Gules, three clarions or) impaling Smith of Exeter (Sable, a fess cotised between three martlets or)
  - Grace Smith, wife of the heroic Civil War Royalist commander Sir Bevil Grenville (1596–1643) of Bideford in Devon and Stowe, Kilkhampton in Cornwall, killed in action at the Battle of Lansdowne (1643) and a Member of Parliament for Cornwall 1621–1625 and 1640–1642, and for Launceston 1625–1629 and 1640. She was the mother of John Grenville, 1st Earl of Bath (1628–1701) and her other thirteen children were by Royal Warrant of Precedence granted the rank and title of Earl's children by King Charles II on 20 August 1675, in recognition of their father's services. The arms of Smith are shown impaled by Grenville on top of the monument of Sir Bevil Grenville in Kilkhampton Church.

== Death and burial ==
He died on 21 March 1619 and was buried in Exeter Cathedral. His heir was his son Sir Nicholas Smith. His will was disputed by his widow Grace and his son-in-law Sir Thomas Monck.

== Sources ==
- Yerby, George & Hunneyball, Paul, biography of George Smith (d. 1619) of Madford House, Exeter, published in The History of Parliament: the House of Commons 1604-1629, ed. Andrew Thrush and John P. Ferris, 2010
- Vivian, Lt.Col. J. L., (ed.) The Visitations of the County of Devon: Comprising the Heralds' Visitations of 1531, 1564 & 1620, Exeter, 1895, pp. 691–2, pedigree of Smyth of Exeter
