= Thomas Smith (Royal Navy officer, died 1708) =

Royal Navy officer

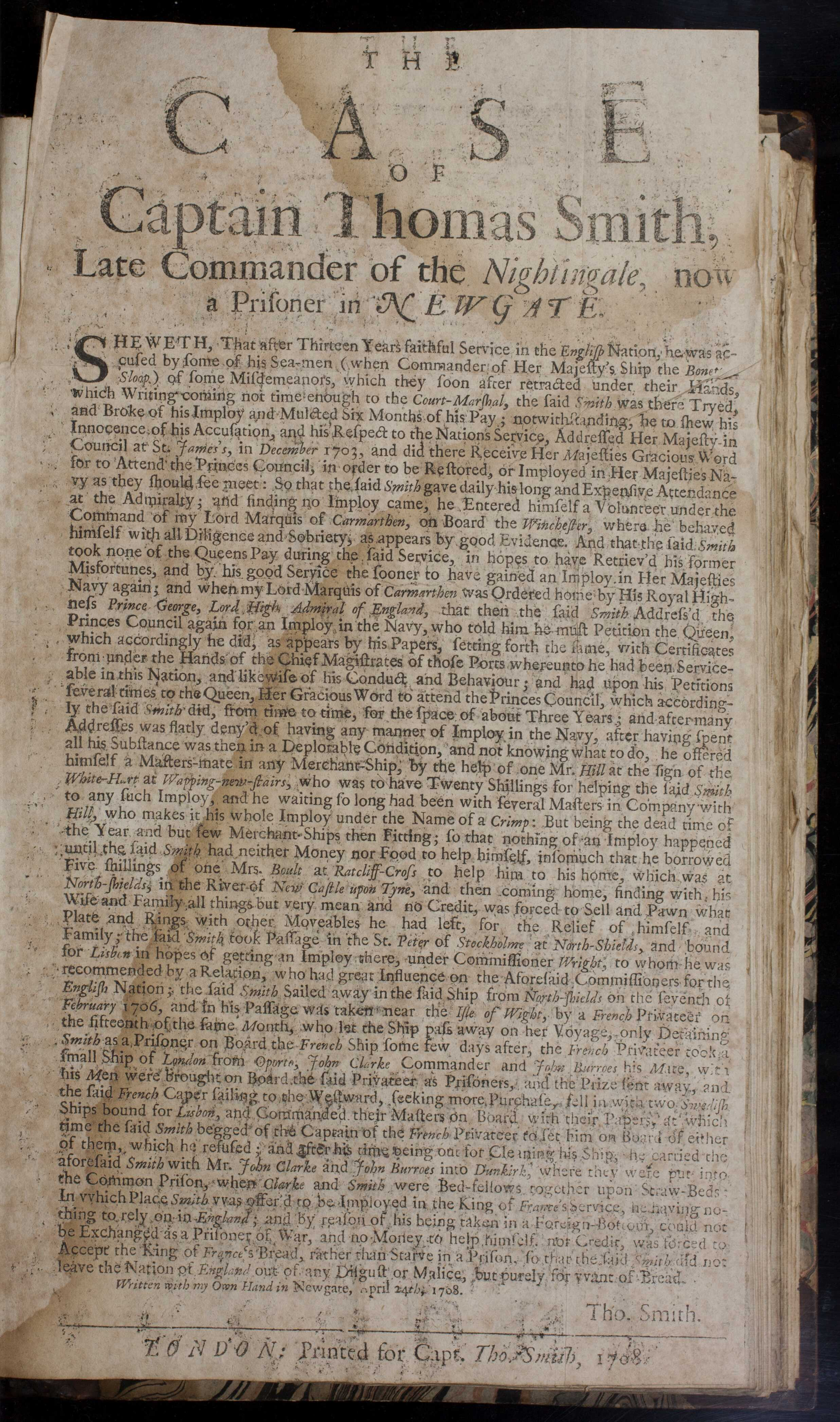
The Case of Captain Thomas Smith, Late Commander of the Nightingale, now a Prisoner in Newgate, a broadside publication of Smith's statement from Newgate prison a few months before his trial and execution (Newberry Library, Chicago)

Thomas Smith (died 18 June 1708) was a Royal Navy officer.

== Biography ==
Smith was the son of English parents. He was born at sea between Holland and England, and was brought up in North Yarmouth. Between 1680 and 1690 he commanded different merchant ships, and in 1691 was commander and one-third owner of a ship trading from Plymouth. He then entered on board the Portsmouth galley and was rated by Captain William Whetstone as a midshipman. His knowledge of the French coast proved useful, and Smith was led by Whetstone, and afterwards by Captain John Bridges, to expect promotion through their recommendation; but on Bridges being wounded and sent to hospital, Smith was put on shore by the first lieutenant, who was acting as captain, and received nothing but his pay ticket as midshipman. In 1693 he shipped as pilot of the St. Martin's prize, and, being discharged from her, married a widow with five young children, whom he was called on to maintain. He then got the command of a transport and carried stores to Kinsale, where he was engaged by Captain John Lapthorne as pilot of the Mercury, which was going off Brest to gain intelligence of the French fleet. Smith was put on shore and returned with exact details of the enemy's fleet, for which service he was paid a grant of 30l., and was promoted to command the Germoon on 22 September 1696. In the Germoon he continued for two years, carrying despatches to the West Indies, and was then ordered to go out with Rear-admiral John Benbow; but was afterwards superseded, and for three years was left unemployed, nor could he get his pay. After the accession of Queen Anne, much to his disappointment, as having expected something better, he was appointed to the Bonetta, a small sloop employed in convoy service in the North Sea—a paltry command which did not, he alleged, compensate him for the loss he had sustained by being kept waiting so long.

The grievance was no doubt a real one, and was not uncommon both then and long afterwards. Smith endeavoured to take the remedy into his own hands, and when he had been in the Bonetta about fifteen months, he was charged by his officers and men with many irregularities, such as hiring out the men to merchant ships, taking money for discharging prest men, making false musters, being drunk, and often absent for several days together. On these charges he was tried by court-martial on 1 September 1703, was found guilty, and was dismissed from his command, with a fine of six months' pay. For upwards of two years he continued memorialising the queen, but without success; he then offered himself as a midshipman on board some flagship, but was refused by Sir Clowdisley Shovell, the commander-in-chief of the fleet; and in February 1706–7, being almost destitute, he took a passage in a Swedish ship bound to Lisbon, where he thought he had some interest. Off the Isle of Wight, however, the Swede was overhauled by a Dunkirk privateer, and Smith was taken out of her and carried to Dunkirk. There, apparently without much pressing, he entered the French service, and was appointed to serve—probably as pilot—on board the admiral-galley of the squadron which captured the Nightingale off Harwich on 24 August 1707.

When Jermy was brought on board the admiral-galley, he saw and recognised Smith and threw himself on him, sword in hand, exclaiming ‘Traitor, you shall not escape me as you have done the hangman.’ Jermy, however, was seized and held back, but when Smith angrily desired that the prisoner might be sent to another galley, he was disdainfully told that he might go himself if he liked. The squadron had been intended to attack Harwich, and Smith now urged that the attempt should be made. The French admiral, De Langeron, refused, as the galleys had suffered severely in the engagement with the Nightingale. On their return Smith laid a formal complaint against De Langeron, whose reasons were held to be sufficient. He then suggested that, with the Nightingale and another ship then at Dunkirk, he should be allowed to make the attempt. He accordingly received a commission to command the Nightingale, and on 24 December he put to sea, in company with the Squirrel, another English prize. On the forenoon of the 27th, as they were approaching Harwich, they were sighted and chased by Captain Nicholas Haddock in the Ludlow Castle. After a chase of ten hours the Nightingale was overtaken, and after a short resistance was captured. The Squirrel escaped. Smith, it was said, had wished to blow up the ship, but was forcibly prevented by his men. When taken, he was put on shore at Hull, whence he was sent up to London, tried at the Old Bailey on 2 June 1708, found guilty of bearing arms against his country, was sentenced to death, and was executed on 18 June with all the barbarities directed by law.
