= Thomas Smyth (Archdeacon of Glendalough) =

Thomas Smyth LL.D. was an Irish Anglican priest.

The son of Thomas Smyth Bishop of Limerick, he was born in Drumcree, County Westmeath and educated at Trinity College, Dublin. He was appointed Archdeacon of Glendalough in 1723 and served until 1751.
