= Benjamin Waring =

South Carolina politician & settler

Maj. Benjamin Robert Waring I

Commissioner of Taxes for the North Side of the Ashley River
- In office 1711
- In office 1703

Member of the South Carolina Assembly from Berkely County
- In office 1693

Member of the South Carolina House of Commons
- In office 1685

Personal details
- Born: 1655 London, Middlesex, Commonwealth of England
- Died: 1713 (aged 57–58) Charleston County, Colony of South Carolina
- Spouse: Elizabeth Beamor
- Children: 8, including Benjamin Waring II
- Relatives: Waring Family
- Occupation: planter, politician

Military service
- Rank: Major
- Battles/wars: Queen Anne's War; Lefebvre's Charles Town expedition

Maj. Benjamin Robert Waring I was an English-American immigrant to what is today South Carolina. He serves several political roles in the colony of South Carolina. He is also the founder of the Waring Family in the United States.

== Early life ==
Benjamin Robert Waring I was born in London, England in 1655 to Michael Waring II. His family came from Wolverhampton, where they lived at Lea Hall.

There are a number of Lea Halls in the West Midlands. One east of Birmingham, the second one is a fine 16th century house north of Shrewsbury, Shropshire, but the closest one to Wolverhampton is at Boningale, a hamlet south of Albrighton, on the A464 road between Wolverhampton and Shifnal.Lea Hall

== Immigration & Political Career ==
Benjamin immigrated to America in 1683, settling in what is today South Carolina. He served in the South Carolina House of Commons shortly after his arrival in 1685, and later served on the South Carolina Assembly in 1693. His last role in office was that of a Tax Commissioner in 1703 and 1711.

== Later life & Legacy ==
Benjamin Waring I served as a Major in some of the early conflicts in South Carolina, before dying in 1713, aged 57-58, leaving behind 8 children. His notable descendants are Morton Waring, Dr. Joseph Ioor Waring, Julius Waties Waring, J. Fred. Waring, and William Richard Waring.
