= Christmas cracker =

Table decoration that makes a snapping sound when pulled

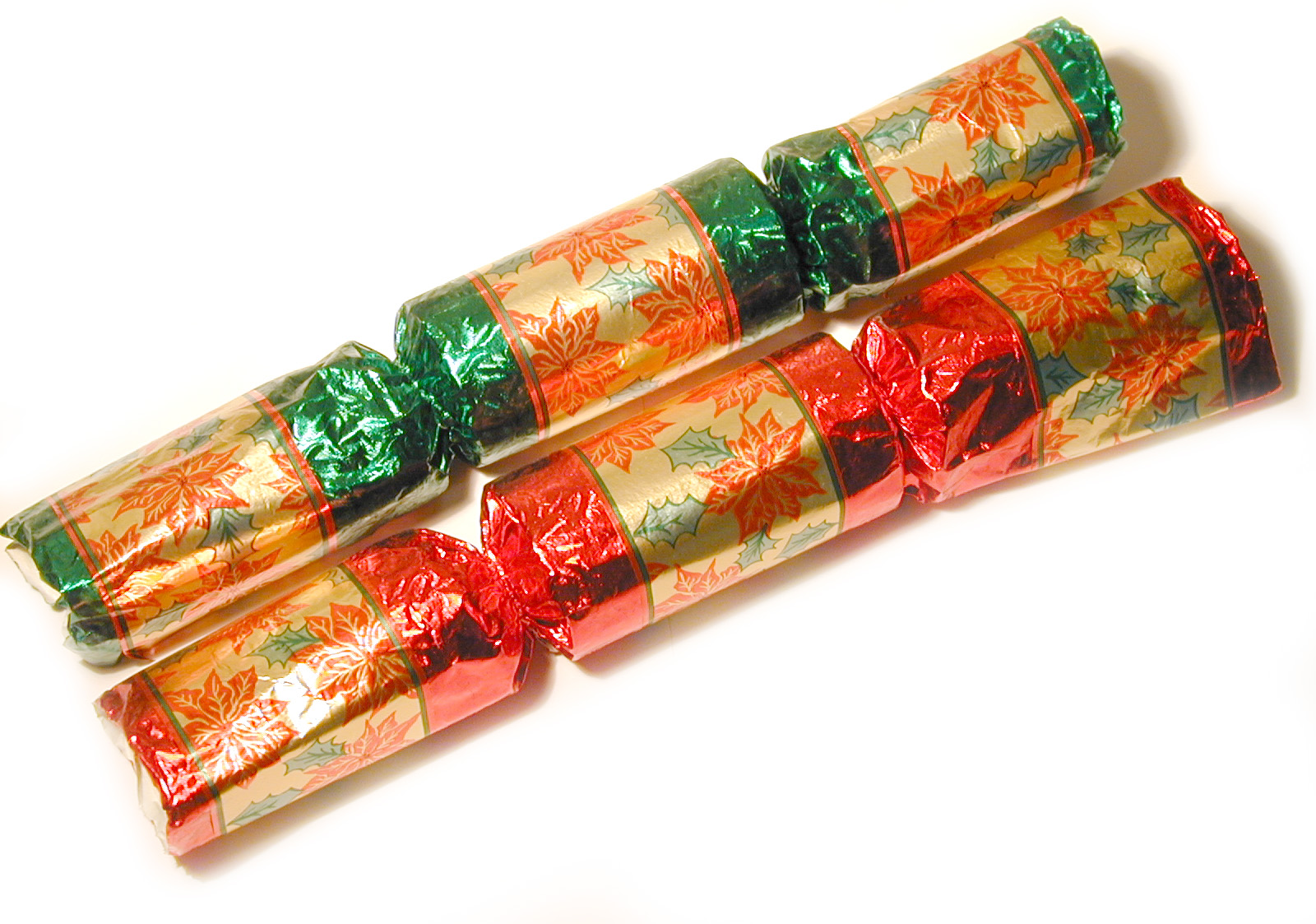
Christmas crackers

Christmas crackers are festive table decorations that make a snapping sound when pulled open, and typically contain a small gift, paper hat and a joke. They are part of Christmas celebrations in the United Kingdom, Ireland and Commonwealth countries such as Australia, Canada, New Zealand and South Africa.

A cracker consists of a segmented cardboard tube wrapped in a brightly decorated twist of paper with a prize in the centre, making it resemble an oversized sweet-wrapper. The cracker is pulled apart by two people, each holding an outer chamber, causing the cracker to split unevenly and leaving one person holding the central chamber and prize. The split is accompanied by a mild bang or snapping sound produced by the effect of friction on a shock-sensitive, chemically impregnated card strip (similar to that used in a cap gun). One chemical used for the friction strip is silver fulminate.

== Tradition ==
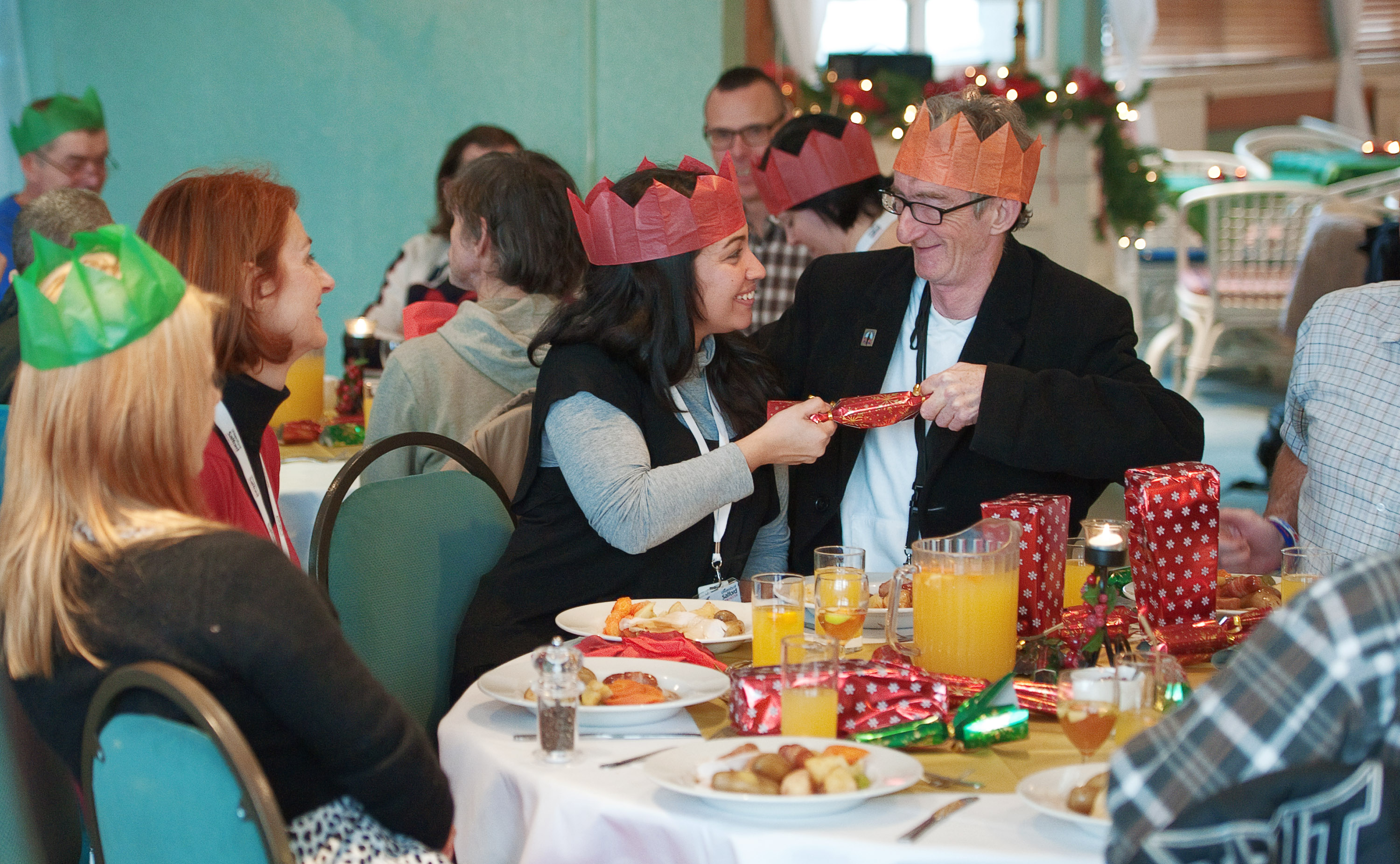
Dinner party guests pull a cracker

Crackers are traditionally pulled during Christmas dinner or at Christmas parties. One version of the cracker ritual holds that the person who ends up with the larger end of the cracker earns the right to keep the contents of the cardboard tube. Sometimes, each participant retains ownership of their own cracker and keeps its contents regardless of the outcome. Christmas crackers traditionally contain a colourful crown-shaped hat made of tissue paper, a small toy, a plastic model, or a trinket, and a small strip of paper with a motto, a joke, a riddle, or a piece of trivia. The paper hats, with the appearance of crowns, are usually worn at Christmas dinner. The tradition of wearing festive hats is believed to date back to Roman times and the Saturnalia celebrations, which also involved decorative headgear.

Christmas crackers are also associated with Knut's parties, held in Sweden at the end of the Christmas season.

Author and historian John Julius Norwich (Viscount Norwich) was known for sending his family and friends a Christmas Cracker each year which was a kind of expanded Christmas card of anecdotes, trivia and witticisms collected from history and literature. Initially he printed them privately to give to friends but also sold via some London bookstores. His 49th and final cracker was published posthumously in the year of his death.

== History ==
The Oxford English Dictionary records the pulling of crackers from 1847.

=== Tom Smith ===
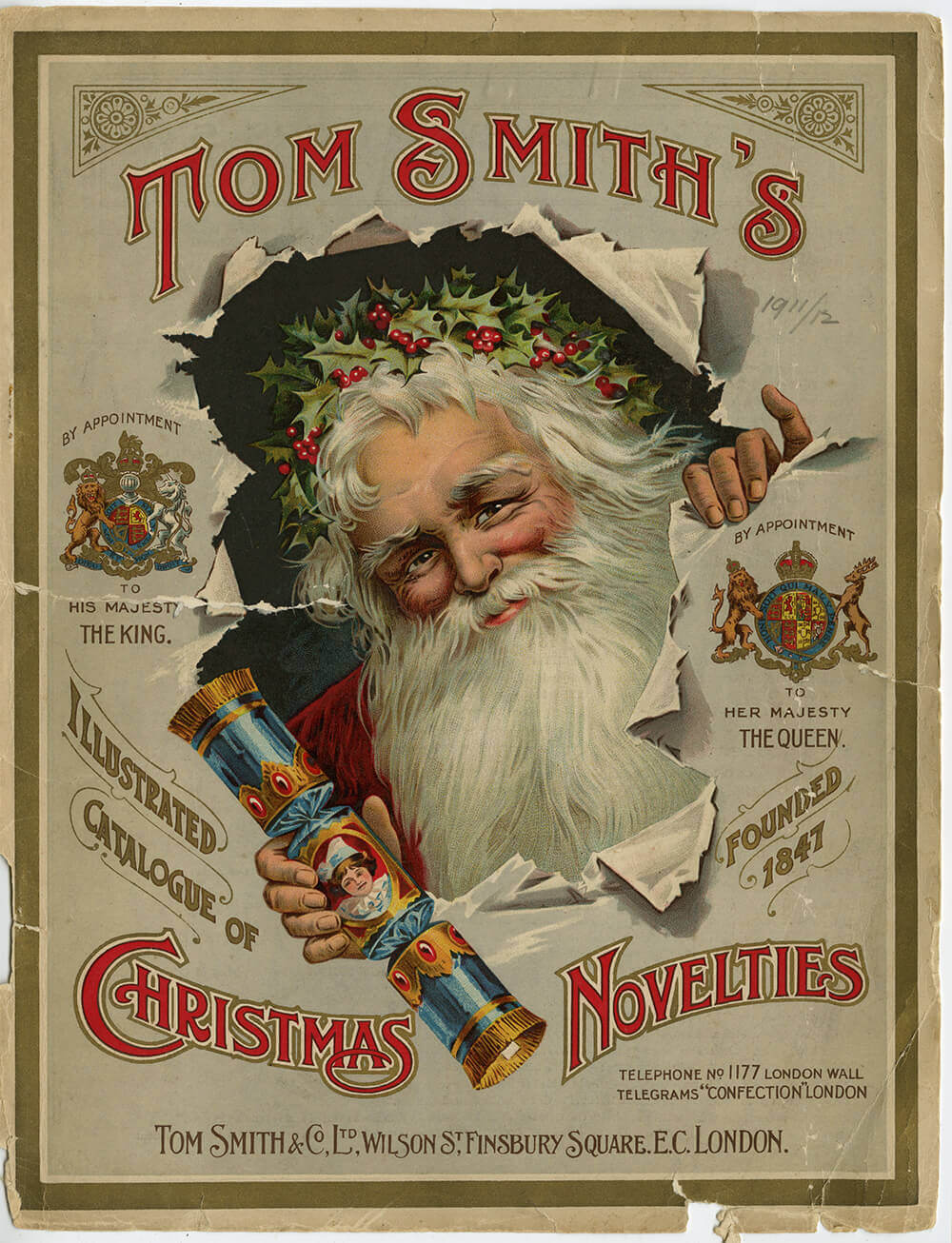
Catalogue for Tom Smith's Christmas Novelties from 1911

Tradition tells of how Tom Smith (1823–1869) of London invented crackers in 1847. He created the crackers as a development of his bon-bon sweets, which he sold in a twist of paper (the origins of the traditional sweet-wrapper). As sales of bon-bons slumped, Smith began to come up with new promotional ideas. His first tactic was to insert love messages into the wrappers of the sweets (similar to fortune cookies).

Smith was inspired to add a "crackle" element after hearing the crackle of a log he had just put on a fire. The size of the paper wrapper had to be increased to incorporate the banger mechanism, and the sweet itself was eventually dropped, to be replaced by a trinket: fans, jewellery and other substantial items. The new product was initially marketed as the Cosaque (French for Cossack), but the onomatopoeic "cracker" soon became the commonly used name, as rival varieties came on the market.

The other elements of the modern cracker—the gifts, paper hats and varied designs—were all introduced by Tom Smith's son, Walter Smith, to differentiate his product from the rival cracker manufacturers which had suddenly sprung up.

Tom Smith & Company merged with Caley Crackers in 1953.

A memorial water fountain to Tom Smith and his family stands in Finsbury Square, London.

=== Art ===
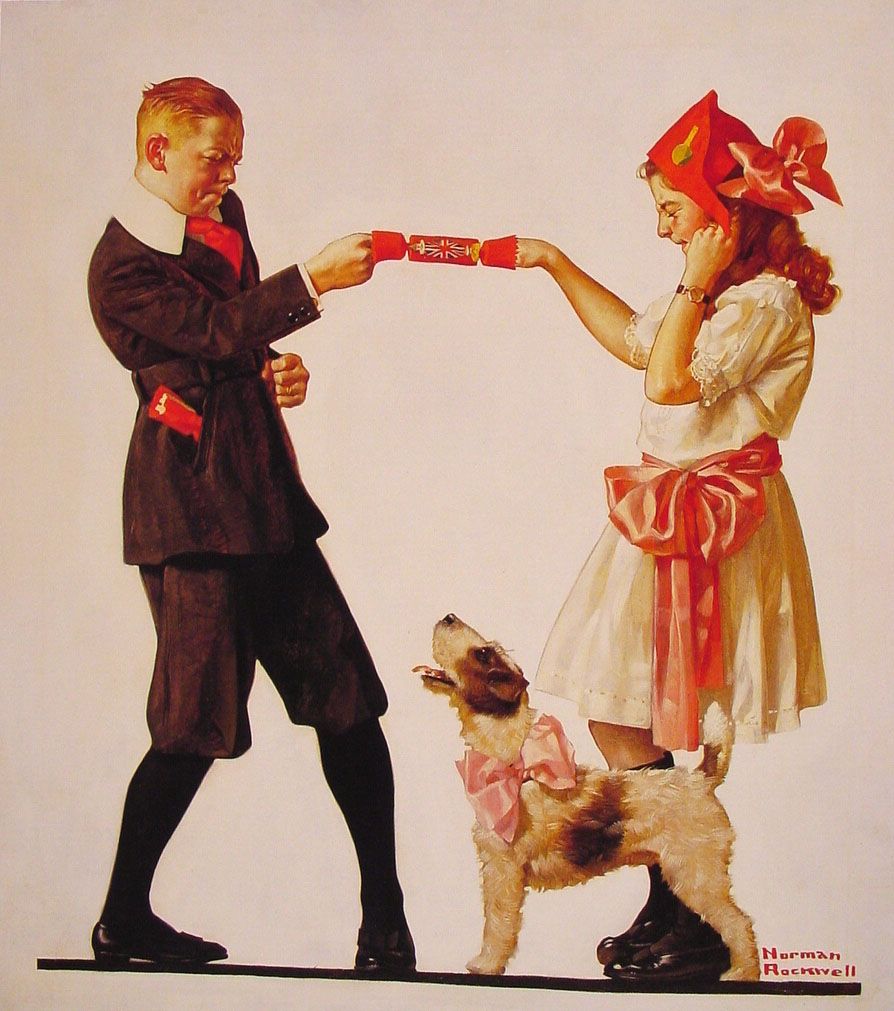
Norman Rockwell (1919)

A Christmas cracker is the subject of The Party Favor, an oil painting by American artist Norman Rockwell. The painting appeared as cover art for The Saturday Evening Post on 26 April 1919.

=== Records ===
The World's Largest Christmas Cracker was measured at 63.1 m (207 ft) long and 4 m (13 ft) in diameter and was made by the parents of children at Ley Hill School and Pre-School, Chesham, Buckinghamshire, UK on 20 December 2001.

The longest Christmas cracker pulling chain consisted of 1081 people and was achieved by The Harrodian School in London on 10 December 2015.

On 17 August 2020, while filming a Christmas episode of the television series QI, British comedian Alan Davies set a Guinness World Record for the most crackers pulled by an individual in 30 seconds. He achieved 35 successful cracks, outscoring fellow panelist Justin Moorhouse by five in a head-to-head competition. Davies' record stood until Joel Corry achieved 41 successful cracks at Capital's Jingle Bell Ball on 12 December 2021.

== Flight restrictions ==
Rules on transporting Christmas crackers in luggage vary by airline and airport. Passengers on commercial flights in and to the United States are explicitly prohibited from carrying Christmas crackers on board or in checked baggage.
