= Thomas B. Smith (conservation biologist) =

American evolutionary and conservation biologist

- Education: UC Berkeley (Ph.D. Zoology); University of Wisconsin, Madison (B.S., M.S. Zoology)
- Website: https://www.ioes.ucla.edu/person/thomas-smith/

Thomas Bates Smith is an American evolutionary and conservation biologist. His research focuses on rainforest biodiversity, species evolution in human-altered environments, the ecology of animal and human diseases, wildlife trafficking, migratory bird conservation, and the development of new approaches for mitigating the impacts of climate change.

== Education and career ==
Smith received his BS and MS degrees at the University of Wisconsin Madison and his PhD from the University of California, Berkeley. He joined San Francisco State University as an assistant professor in 1992 and became a full professor in 1999. In 2002 Smith moved to the University of California, Los Angeles (UCLA) where he is a distinguished professor in the Department of Ecology and Evolutionary Biology and the Institute of the Environment and Sustainability. He is the founding director of the Center for Tropical Research and a founding co-director of the Congo Basin Institute.

== Research ==
Smith's work spans a broad range of research, conservation, and educational and policy efforts worldwide. A central focus of his research investigates how biodiversity is generated and maintained in tropical rainforests. The results of Smith's research point to new and more effective ways of prioritizing regions for conservation and mitigating the impacts of climate change. Smith has published over 230 scientific papers.

=== Center for Tropical Research ===
Smith founded the Center for Tropical Research in 1997 "to understand the biotic processes that underlie and maintain the diversity of life in the tropics, and to advance conservation efforts that protect species and their habitats."

=== Bird Genoscape Project ===
In the early 1990s, Smith and his graduate students began collecting feathers from bird banding stations to study migratory patterns of bird species via genetic marker testing. Through collaborations with partners such as the Institute for Bird Populations and feather donations over the years, the Center for Tropical Research's Neotropical feather collection now houses samples from more than 200,000 individual birds from the Americas. In 2009, Smith co-founded the Bird Genoscape Project with the goal to map the migration routes of 100 migratory birds utilizing advances in genomics.

=== Congo Basin Institute ===
In 2015, Smith worked to create the Congo Basin Institute, a partnership between the International Institute for Tropical Agriculture and UCLA. The Congo Basin Institute is the first foreign affiliate for UCLA and serves as a regional nexus for interdisciplinary research, education, training and technology development focused on finding solutions to critical issues facing the Congo Basin in Africa, including water and food security, biodiversity, and human health.

== Awards and honors ==
Smith received the American Ornithological Society's 2020 Elliott Coues Award which recognizes outstanding and innovative contributions to ornithological research. In 2013 he received the Biotropica Award for Excellence in Tropical Biology and Conservation. Smith is an elected fellow of the American Ornithologists' Union, the California Academy of Sciences. and the American Academy of Arts and Sciences.
