= Thomas Smith (governor of South Carolina) =

English-born administrator and planter

Thomas Smith Landgrave
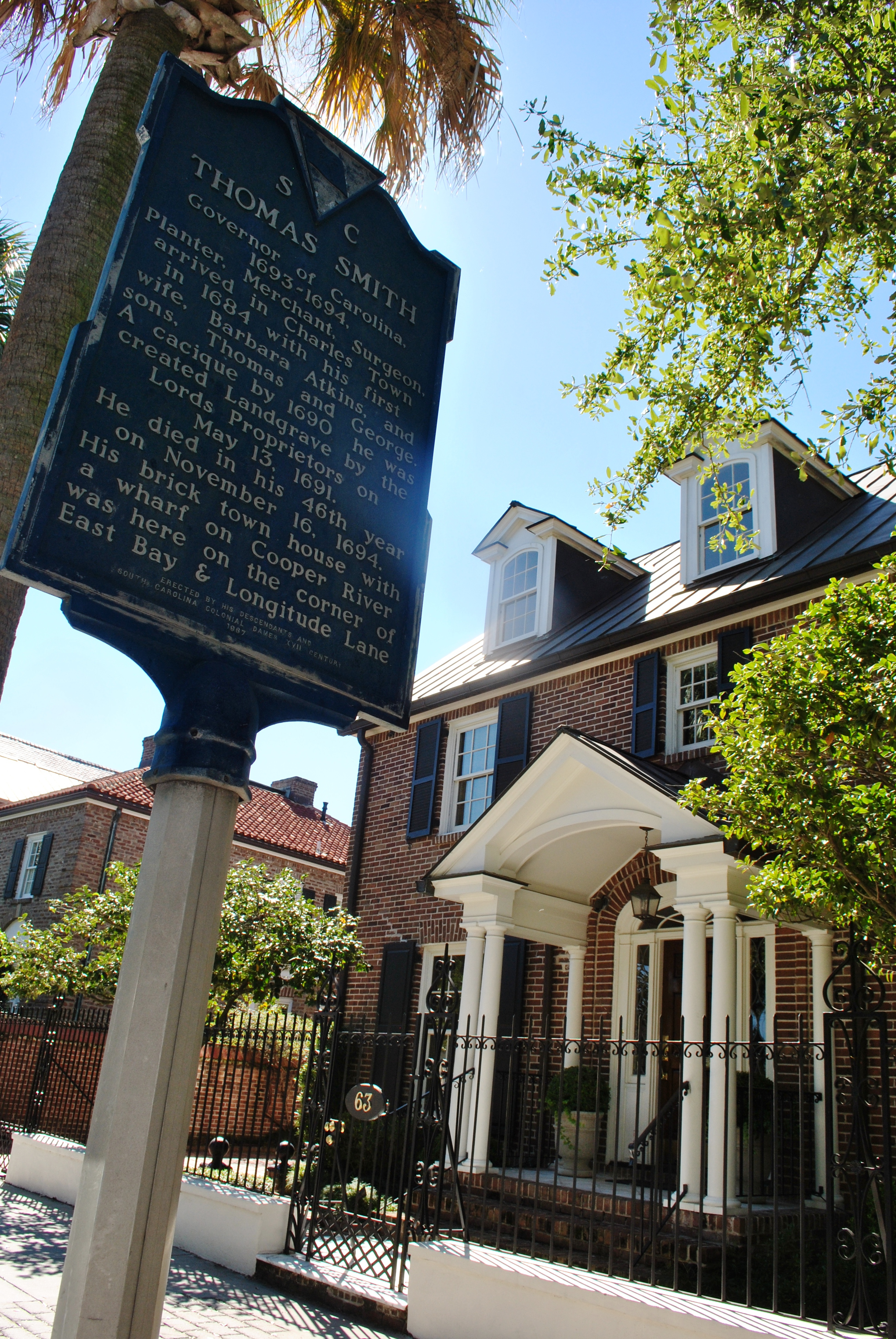
- A marker dedicated to Smith in Charleston

Baron of Wiskinboo

Governor of South Carolina
- In office May 1693 – 16 November 1694
- Monarch: William III
- Preceded by: Philip Ludwell
- Succeeded by: Joseph Blake

Landgrave of the Province of Carolina
- In office 1691–1694
- Monarch: William III

Personal details
- Born: 1648 Exeter, England
- Died: 16 November 1694 (aged 45–46) South Carolina
- Spouse(s): Barbara Atkins; Sabrina de Vignon
- Children: 3, including Thomas Smith

Thomas Smith (c. 1648 – 16 November 1694) was an English-born administrator and planter who served as the colonial governor of South Carolina from 1693 to 1694. He was appointed deputy governor in May 1693, following Governor Philip Ludwell's departure, but was officially commissioned as governor on 29 November 1693.

== Biography ==
Coat of Arms of Thomas Smith

He was born in Exeter, Devonshire, England, as the son of John Thomas Smith and Joan Atkins. He was the grandson of Sir Nicholas Smith MP and the great-grandson of Sir George Smith MP.

He arrived in Charles Town in 1684 with his first wife Barbara Atkins and his sons Thomas and George. He was a Cacique by 1690 and was made Landgrave by the Lords Proprietors on 13 May 1691.

He died in 1694 and is buried at Medway Plantation. A stone slab marks his grave with the inscription: "Here Lieth Ye Body of the Right Honble Thomas Smith Esq. one of Ye Landgraves of Carolina who Departed This Life Ye16th of November, 1694. Governor of the Province of Carolina in Ye 46 year of his age."

Governor Archdale described Thomas Smith as "a wise sober and moderate welliving man." The Proprietors, writing to Governor Archdale on 10 January 1695, stated: We forward copies of letters written by Colonel Smith not long before his death, that you may enjoy with us his satisfactory account of the growing condition of the province and of the peace and union to which he had brought it. He appears to us to have been a man not only of great parts, integrity and honesty but of a generous temper and a nobleness of spirit as to the public good as is scarcely to be met withal in this age.

His brick townhouse with a wharf on Cooper River was on the corner of East Bay and Longitude Lane.

Smith was the grandfather of Rev. Josiah Smith, a prominent minister of colonial South Carolina.
