= Ironmonger Row Baths =

Turkish bath in London, England

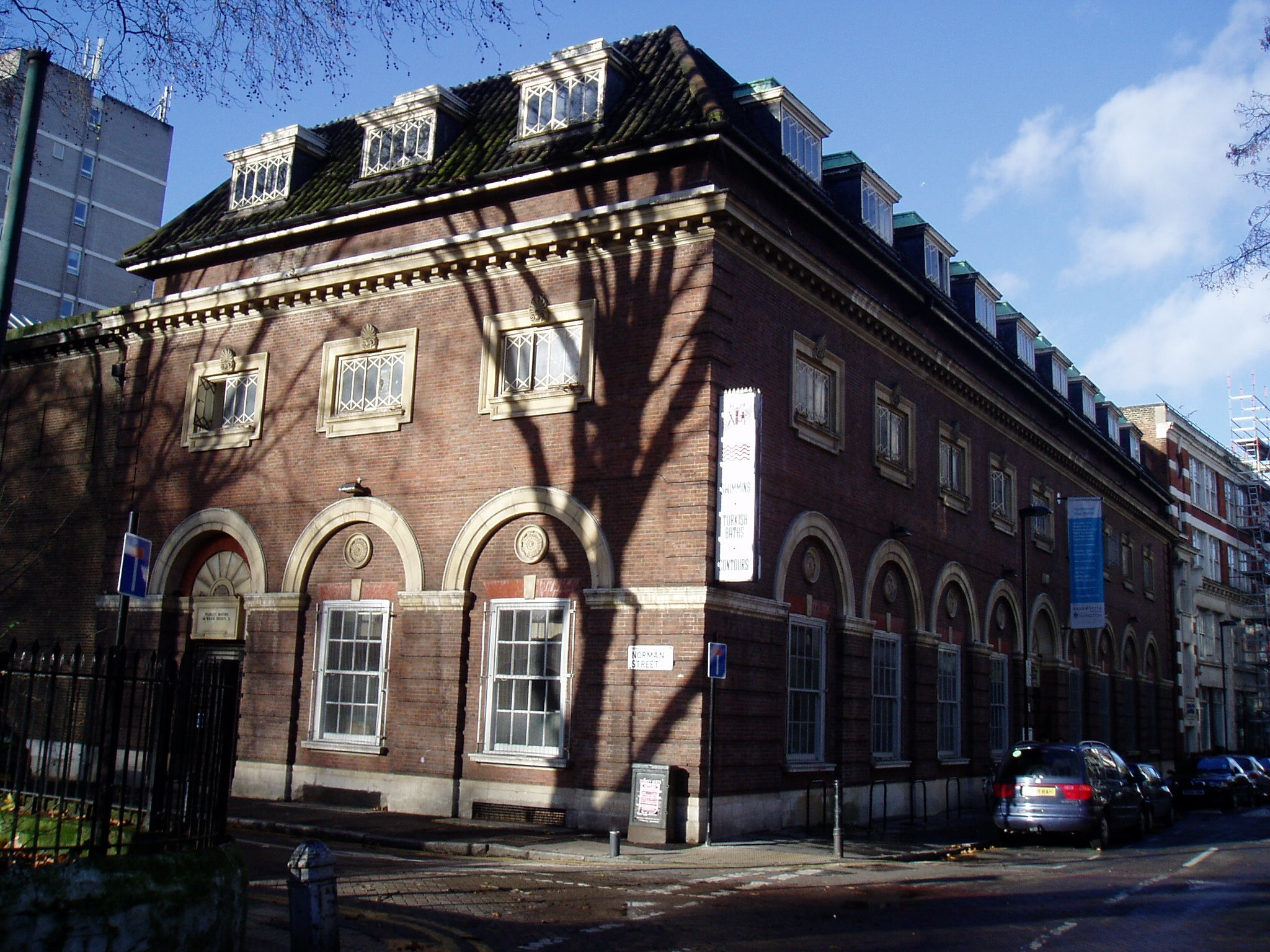

General information
- Type: Public wash house; Turkish bath
- Location: 1–11 Ironmonger Row, St Luke's, Islington, London, England
- Coordinates: 51.526643°N 0.094830°W
- Opened: 1931
- Management: Greenwich Leisure Limited

Design and construction
- Architect: AWS & KMB Cross
- Designations: Grade II Listed

Other information
- Facilities: steam room, hot rooms, massage slabs, plunge pool, launderette

Website
- www.better.org.uk/leisure-centre/london/islington/ironmonger-row-baths

Ironmonger Row Baths were built in two phases. The first, a public wash house and slipper baths, opened in 1931. The second phase, comprising the main swimming pool, the children's pool, and Victorian-style Turkish baths, opened in 1938. They are located at Ironmonger Row, in the St Luke's district, near Old Street, Islington, London.

== Description ==
The baths include a steam room, a Victorian-style Turkish bath comprising a series of three hot rooms of varying temperature, marble slabs for massage and body scrubbing and an icy plunge pool. In addition there are two relaxation areas. The swimming pool is 100 feet (slightly over 30 metres) long. There is a small sauna next to the pool, as well as a well equipped modern gym located within the building. There is also a communal laundry facility (launderette) in the building.

Extensive renovations to the entire building were carried out between May 2010 and December 2012. A fire in December 2021 destroyed one of the restored saunas and caused damage to the basement of the building.

The facility operates numerous programs, including a branch of the Tom Daley Diving Academy.

== History ==
The baths were designed by architects AWS & KMB Cross, built in 1931, and extended in 1938. They have been managed by Greenwich Leisure Limited (GLL) since the 2012 refurbishment.

From just after the Second World War until the new complex at Crystal Palace was built in the late 1960s, the baths were the home of the world-famous Highgate Diving Club, who held their club night there every Friday and also met during the public sessions on Saturday mornings. The Olympic diver, Brian Phelps(winner of the bronze medal for highboard diving in the 1960 Olympics) trained there regularly with his coach, Wally Orner, as did many of the club's international and Olympic divers, such as John Chandler, John Cooze, John Miles, Billy Wood, and Alun Roberts.

It was listed grade II in November 2006 and is located within St. Luke's Conservation Area.

=== Timeline ===
Year	Event
1931	Public Baths. Finsbury Metropolitan Borough Council, Proprietors (Proprs). Turkish Baths planned in the basement
1938	Public Baths. Finsbury Metropolitan Borough Council (Proprs). Extension, including Turkish baths, opened 22 October
1950	During the 1950s and early 1960s the facilities included 'slipper baths' where local residents with no home bath or shower could take a hot bath. There was also a communal laundry area with open wash troughs and slabs.
1966	Ironmonger Row Baths. London Borough of Islington (Proprs, following merger of Finsbury and Islington Metropolitan Boroughs). Including Turkish baths
1990	Finsbury Leisure Complex. London Borough of Islington (Proprs). Including newly refurbished Ironmonger Row Turkish baths
2007	A notorious fight scene from director David Cronenberg's film, Eastern Promises, was filmed on a custom set based on the Ironmonger Row Baths, which involved Viggo Mortensen's character fighting Chechen gangsters to the death in the steam room.
2009	£16 million refurbishment plan announced. The work is planned for completion in 2012.
2010	Baths closed for refurbishment in May 2010.
2012	Refurbishment finished

== Archival records ==
Islington Local History Centre holds plans, photographs and commemorative material related to Ironmonger Row Baths.
