= Glasshouse Yard =

- Aldersgate Street at the junction with Carthusian Street. The area on the left beyond Carthusian Street was in the Liberty of Glasshouse Yard.

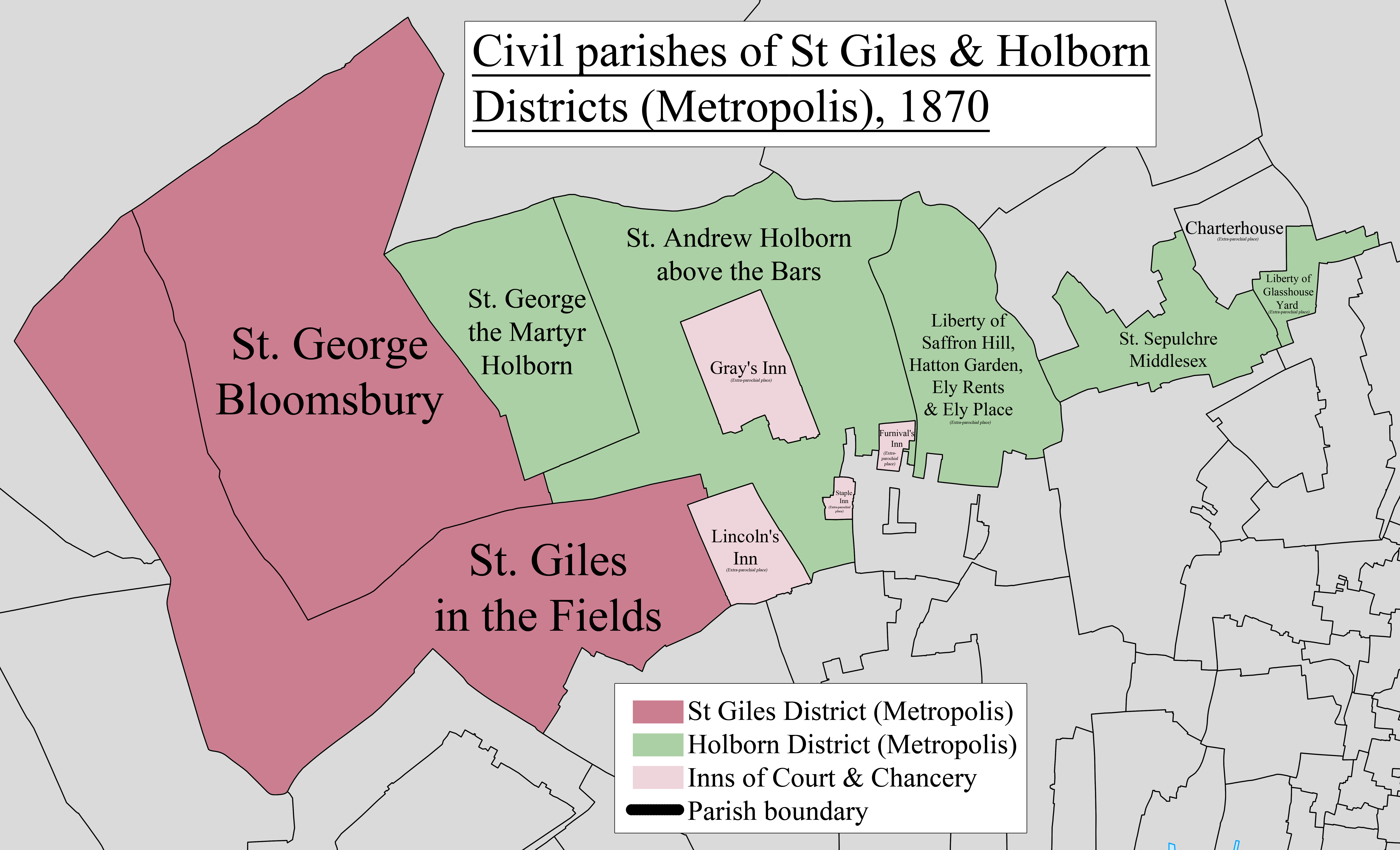
- A map showing the civil parishes of the Metropolis districts of St. Giles and Holborn as they appeared in 1870. Glasshouse Yard is the green area on the far right.
- Area
  - 1801–1911: 5.6 acres (0.023 km^{2})
  - Coordinates: 51°31′17″N 0°05′53″W
- Population
  - 1801: 1,221
  - 1841: 1,415
  - 1881: 931
  - 1911: 463
- History
  - Created: Seventeenth century
  - Abolished: 1915
  - Succeeded by: Finsbury
- Status: Civil parish, liberty, extra-parochial area

The Liberty of Glasshouse Yard was an extra-parochial liberty adjacent to the City of London. The liberty took its name from a glass manufacturing works established there. The area now forms part of the London Borough of Islington.

== Formation ==
This area was originally part of the parish of St Botolph without Aldersgate. Most of that parish lay within the medieval, near fixed, boundaries of the City of London, with the main exception being this northernmost area in the adjoining county of Middlesex. Over the centuries housing and the population of this portion increased such that it became by the 18th century an overwhelmingly urban extension of London of roughly the same density as the south. The Yard's own administration was formed, (board of trustees), when the Poor Relief Act 1601 (Elizabethan Poor Law) was introduced.

== The Glasshouse ==
The name and date of establishment of the liberty (1601) attest to its "glass-house" or glass-making factory, recorded in later decades. This status coincided with the reign of Elizabeth I, whose government pursued a policy of encouraging new industries, exempting them from onerous tithes. High fire risk (and noxious industries such as tanning, dyeing and slaughterhouses) were banned from the City so such industries occupied the area immediately adjoining it. By 1661 the factory was manufacturing crystal glass. By 1700 production appears to have ended.

== Extent ==
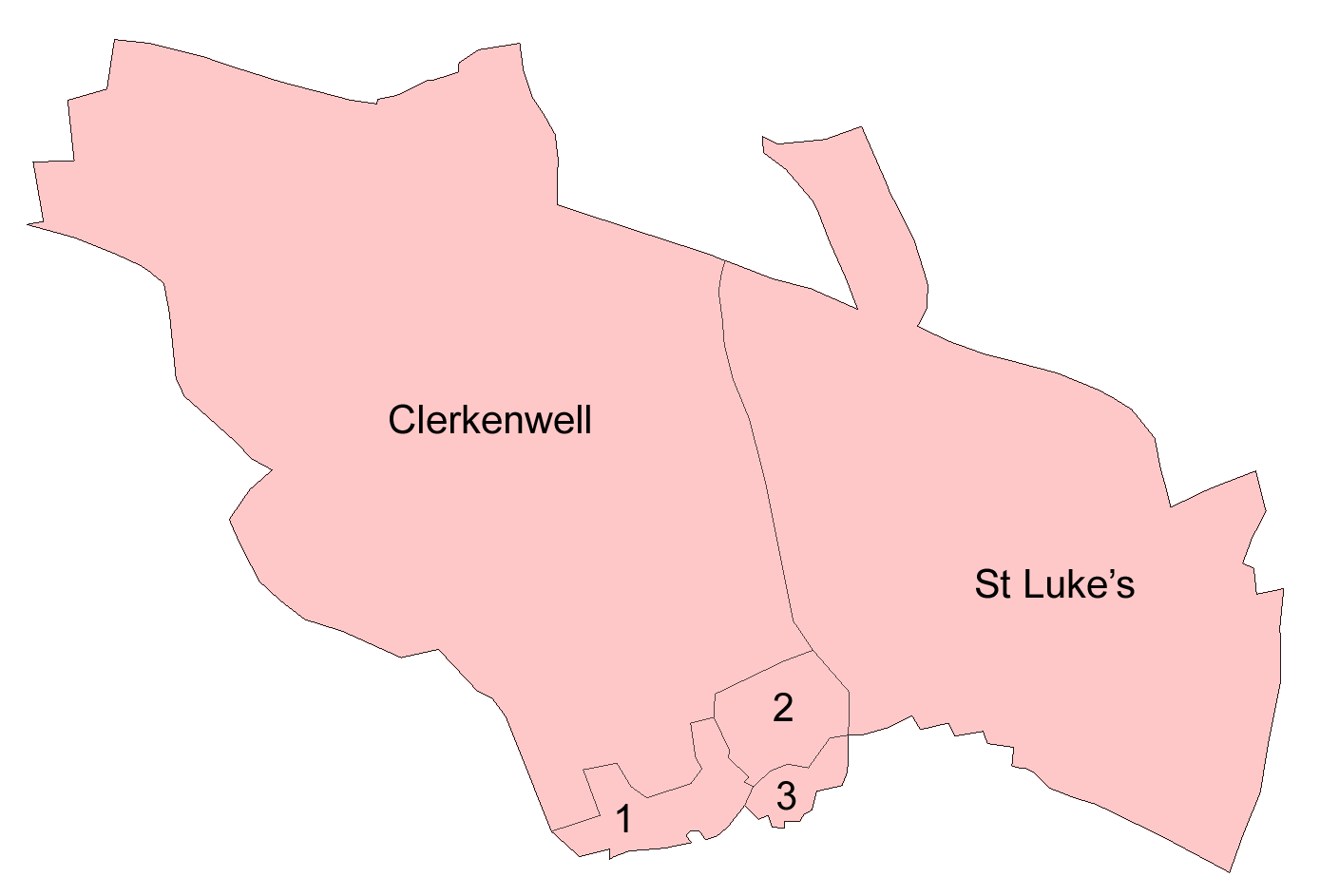
Civil parish (3) within the Metropolitan Borough of Finsbury in 1911

The Liberty of Glasshouse Yard was bounded to the south by the (many parishes of the) City, to the west by the parish of St Sepulchre to the northeast by the Liberty of Charterhouse and to the north and north west by the parish of St Luke's. It had an area of 5.6 acres (2.3 ha), and by the 19th century became partly covered by Goswell Street (the A1) and Pickaxe Street.

== Governance ==
=== Finsbury division ===
The liberty formed part of Ossulstone Hundred, one of six divisions of Middlesex primarily used for taxation assessment purposes after the mid medieval period as the powers of the King's courts and each parish vestry superseded those of manorial courts and especially the Hundred Court. Ossulstone was the hundred nearest the city, and saw great population growth. By the 17th century the hundred divided and further empowered into divisions, and Glasshouse Yard became part of the Finsbury Division.

=== Poor law ===
The liberty was a separate jurisdiction from the remainder of the parish of St Botolph for the administration of the poor law, and by the early eighteenth century the chief officer was known as the "headborough". The Poor Law Amendment Act 1834 allowed for the grouping of parishes into Poor Law Unions, with a single workhouse established in each union. In 1837 Glasshouse Yard was included in the East London Poor Law Union, which comprised the City parishes of St Botolph, Aldersgate, St Botolph, Aldgate, St Botolph, Bishopsgate and St Giles, Cripplegate. A board of guardians of twenty members was formed, with 2 being elected from the parish of St Botolph Aldersgate. The union built a workhouse at Homerton in 1852.

The Poor Law Amendment Act 1866 provided that all areas for which a separate poor rate was made were to be constituted as parishes, and accordingly Glasshouse Yard became a distinct civil parish separate from its mother parish. In 1869 the East London PLU was merged with two other unions to form the City of London Poor Law Union, covering 118 parishes. In 1901 Glasshouse Yard was transferred to the Holborn Poor Law Union.

=== Holborn District Board ===
The Metropolis Management Act 1855 introduced the first modern local government bodies to govern the built-up area of London. The act introduced two tiers of administration: the Metropolitan Board of Works (MBW) which was to undertake major infrastructure projects with below it a lower level of incorporated parish vestries or district boards. District boards covered two or more parishes and consisted of a number of elected vestrymen from each constituent parish, the number depending on population. The Holborn District Board of Works covered five Middlesex parishes and consisted of forty-nine vestrymen, of which one represented Glasshouse Yard. The first elections were held in November 1855, when the entire membership of the board was elected. Thereafter elections for one third of the seats were held in May, beginning in the year 1857.

In 1889 the area of the Metropolitan Board became the County of London, and the London County Council replaced the MBW. The district board continued to exist for a further eleven years.

=== Metropolitan Borough of Finsbury ===
The London Government Act 1899 abolished the vestries and district boards within the County of London, replacing them with twenty-eight metropolitan boroughs. On 1 November 1900 Glasshouse Yard became part of the Metropolitan Borough of Finsbury which also consisted of the parishes of Charterhouse, Clerkenwell, St Luke and St Sepulchre. Glasshouse Yard was formally abolished on 1 April 1915 when the five parishes in the borough were merged into a single parish of Finsbury. At the 1911 census (the last before the abolition of the parish), Glasshouse Yard had a population of 463.

== Modern development ==
The area once occupied by the liberty has been extensively redeveloped since the Second World War. A modern street named Glasshouse Yard has been constructed to the west of Goswell Road and adjacent to the Golden Lane Estate.
