= Pave =

Pave may refer to:

- Pavement (disambiguation)
- Pavé, a stonesetting method
- Pavê, a Brazilian dessert
- Sett (paving), a kind of cobblestone road surface (from the French pavé meaning "cobblestoned")
- Pave Maijanen, a Finnish musician
- Zaspal Pave, Croatian folk song

Paves may refer to:

- Paves, Lombard troubadour (poet) of the first half of the thirteenth century
- Ken Pavés, a hair stylist known for his work with a variety of high-profile clients

PAVE may refer to:

- PAVE, a United States military electronic system
- Venetie Airport (ICAO location indicator: PAVE), in Venetie, Alaska, United States

Pavé may refer to:

- A cut of rump beef

== See also ==
- Pav (disambiguation)
- Paver (disambiguation)
- Pavić (disambiguation), south Slavic surname
