= Pao =

Pao or PAO may refer to:

== Fiction ==
- Pao-chan, a character from the Japanese magical girl anime television series, Ojamajo Doremi
- Pao, setting of The Languages of Pao, a science fiction novel by Jack Vance
- Pao, a Rebel commando in the film Rogue One: A Star Wars Story

== People ==
- Bruno Pao (1931–2025), Estonian maritime historian and writer
- Pao Ching-yen (also spelled Bao Jingyan), a Chinese anarchist philosopher who presumably lived in the early fourth century C.E.
- Yih-Ho Michael Pao, an American entrepreneur and hydro-engineer
- Pa'O people, an ethnic group in Burma
- Ellen Pao, American lawyer and former Reddit executive
- Yue-Kong Pao, Hong Kong businessman
- Pao language (disambiguation)

== Places ==
- Barangay Pao, an administrative division of Manaoag, Pangasinan
- PAO, the IATA airport code for Palo Alto Airport, Santa Clara County
- Pao River, a tributary of the Chi River in northeast Thailand
- Pao, Trakan Phuet Phon, Ubon Ratchathani Province, Thailand
- Pão de Açúcar, Alagoas, a municipality located in the Brazilian state of Alagoas
- Paoli station, an Amtrak and SEPTA train station in Paoli, Pennsylvania (Amtrak station code)
- Sugarloaf Mountain, a mountain in Rio de Janeiro, Pão de Açúcar in Portuguese

== Technology ==
- Process-Architecture-Optimization, the new 3-generation CPU manufacturing process replacing Intel's tick–tock model

== Organizations ==
- PAO, the ICAO code for Polynesian Airlines
- Panathinaikos A.O., a Greek multisport club
- Panhellenic Liberation Organization, a Greek resistance organization against the Axis occupation of Greece.
- Prince Alfred's Own, a historic name for the Cape Field Artillery
- Public Affairs Office
- Ming Pao, a Chinese newspaper

== Science ==
- Pao (genus), a genus of pufferfishes
- Pao (unit), an obsolete unit of mass and (especially) dry measure in South Asia
- Phased-array optics
- Pheophorbide a oxygenase, an enzyme
- Pierre Auger Observatory
- Polyalphaolefin, a type of polyolefin made from alpha-olefin monomer(s)
- Polyphosphate-accumulating organism

== Other uses ==
- Pao (袍), an element of Han Chinese clothing
- Pão de queijo, a Brazilian cheesy bread
- A fairy chess piece
- Nissan Pao, an automobile
- PeriAcetabular Osteotomy, a surgery used to correct a condition called hip dysplasia or acetabular dysplasia
- Period-after-opening symbol found on cosmetics products
- Public affairs (military) Officer, or PAO, within the U.S. military
- Person-Action-Object (PAO), a technique often used in memory training and by memory athletes

== See also ==
- The dictionary definition of Appendix:Variations of "pao" at Wiktionary
- Pau (disambiguation)
- Pav (disambiguation)
- Bao (disambiguation)
