= Pav =

PAV or Pav can stand for:

== Science and technology ==
- Personal Air Vehicle, a type of aircraft
- Parallel Access Volumes, a feature in CPUs
- Parental Age Verification, a type of age verification
- Air suction valve: also known as a PAV, Pulsed Air Valve
- Pavo (constellation) (standard astronomical abbreviation)

== Food ==
- Pavlova (food), a meringue-based dessert from Australia and New Zealand
- Pav, a type of Indian bread roll

== Voting ==
- Proportional approval voting, an electoral system
- Permanent absentee voting, another electoral system

== People ==
- Pav Gill, Singaporean lawyer who was the whistleblower that uncovered the Wirecard scandal
- Matthew Pavlich (born 1981), Australian rules footballer; games record holder and former captain of the Fremantle Football Club
- Roman Pavlyuchenko (born 1981), Association footballer, a Russian international currently playing for FC Lokomotiv Moscow
- Pav., taxonomic author abbreviation of José Antonio Pavón Jiménez (1754–1840), Spanish botanist

== See also ==
- Pave (disambiguation)
- Pau (disambiguation)
- Pao (disambiguation)
