= Pavement =

Pavement(s) or paving may refer to:

== Surfacing ==
- Road surface, the durable surfacing of roads and walkways
- Sidewalk, a walkway along the side of a road, called a pavement in British English
- Asphalt concrete, a common form of road surface
- Cool pavement, pavement that delivers higher solar reflectance than conventional dark pavement
- Crazy paving, a means of hard-surfacing used outdoors
- Nicolson pavement, a road surface material consisting of wooden blocks
- Pavers (flooring), an outdoor floor done in blocks
- Permeable paving, paving that enables stormwater to flow through it or between gaps
- Portuguese pavement, the traditional paving used in most pedestrian areas in Portugal
- Resin-bound paving, a mixture of aggregate stones and resin used to pave footpaths, driveways, etc.
- Tactile paving, textured ground surface indicators to assist vision-impaired pedestrians
- Whitetopping, the covering of an existing asphalt pavement with a layer of Portland cement concrete

== Geology ==
- Desert pavement, a desert ground surface covered with closely packed rock fragments
- Glacial striation or glacial pavement, a rock surface scoured and polished by glacial action
- Limestone pavement, a naturally occurring landform that resembles an artificial pavement
- Tessellated pavement, a rare sedimentary rock formation that occurs on some ocean shores

== Geography ==
- Pavement (York), a street in York, England
- Finsbury Pavement, a street in London, England
- High Pavement, a street in Nottingham, England
- Low Pavement, a street in Nottingham, England; see 10, Low Pavement

== Arts and entertainment ==
- Pavement (band), an indie rock band from Stockton, California, US
  - Pavements (film), a 2024 film about the band
- Pavement (magazine), a youth culture magazine
- "Pavement" (Space Ghost Coast to Coast), an episode of the American animated TV series Space Ghost Coast to Coast featuring the band

== See also ==
- Pave (disambiguation)
- Pavement engineering, branch of civil engineering that uses engineering techniques to design and maintain flexible (asphalt) and rigid (concrete) pavements
