= St Luke's, London =

Coordinates: 51.525°N 0.093°W

St Luke's
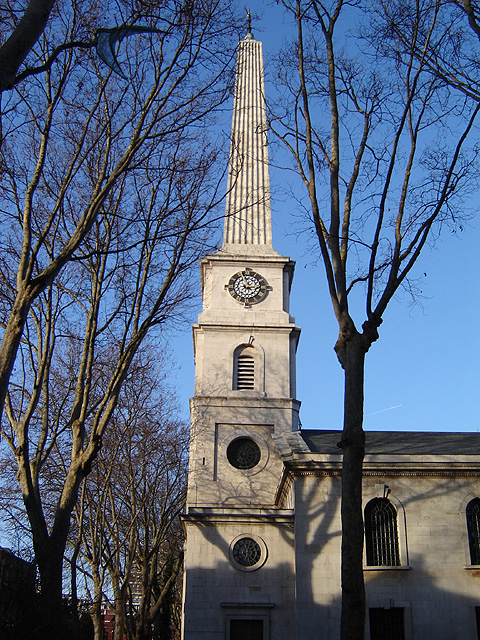
- St Luke's Church, Old Street

- Location within Greater London
- OS grid reference: TQ322824
- London borough: Islington
- Ceremonial county: Greater London
- Region: London
- Country: England
- Sovereign state: United Kingdom
- Post town: LONDON
- Postcode district: EC1
- Dialling code: 020
- Police: Metropolitan
- Fire: London
- Ambulance: London
- UK Parliament: Islington South and Finsbury
- London Assembly: North East

St Luke's is an area in London, England and is located in the London Borough of Islington. It lies just north of the border with the City of London near the Barbican Estate, and the Clerkenwell and Shoreditch areas.

The area takes its name from the now redundant parish church of St Luke's, on Old Street west of Old Street station. Following the closure of the church, the parish was reabsorbed into that of St Giles-without-Cripplegate, from which it had separated in 1733.

== History ==
The civil and ecclesiastical parish of St Luke's was created on 18 October 1733 (St Luke's Day), following the construction of the church of St Luke. The parish was formed from the part of the existing parish of St Giles Cripplegate that was outside the City of London. The area covered by the parish is the same as that previously occupied by the landholding known as the Manor of Finsbury.

Being outside the City boundaries, the parish had a large non-conformist population. John Wesley's house and Wesley's Chapel are in City Road, as is Bunhill Fields burial ground.

In 1751, St Luke's Hospital for Lunatics, an asylum, was founded. It was rebuilt in 1782–1784 by George Dance the Younger. In 1917, the site was sold to the Bank of England for St Luke's Printing Works, which printed banknotes. The building was damaged by the Blitz of 1940, and the printing works were relocated in 1958 to Debden, Essex.

The Grade II listed Ironmonger Row Baths were built as a public wash house in 1931. Victorian-style Turkish baths were added in 1938.

The civil parish became officially known as "St Luke's Middlesex". The parish was historically in the county of Middlesex, and was included in the area of the Metropolitan Board of Works in 1855. Under the Metropolis Management Act 1855 any parish that exceeded 2,000 ratepayers was to be divided into wards; as such the incorporated vestry of St Luke was divided into five wards (electing vestrymen): No. 1 (12), No. 2 (6), No. 3 (9), No. 4 (12) and No. 5 (9).

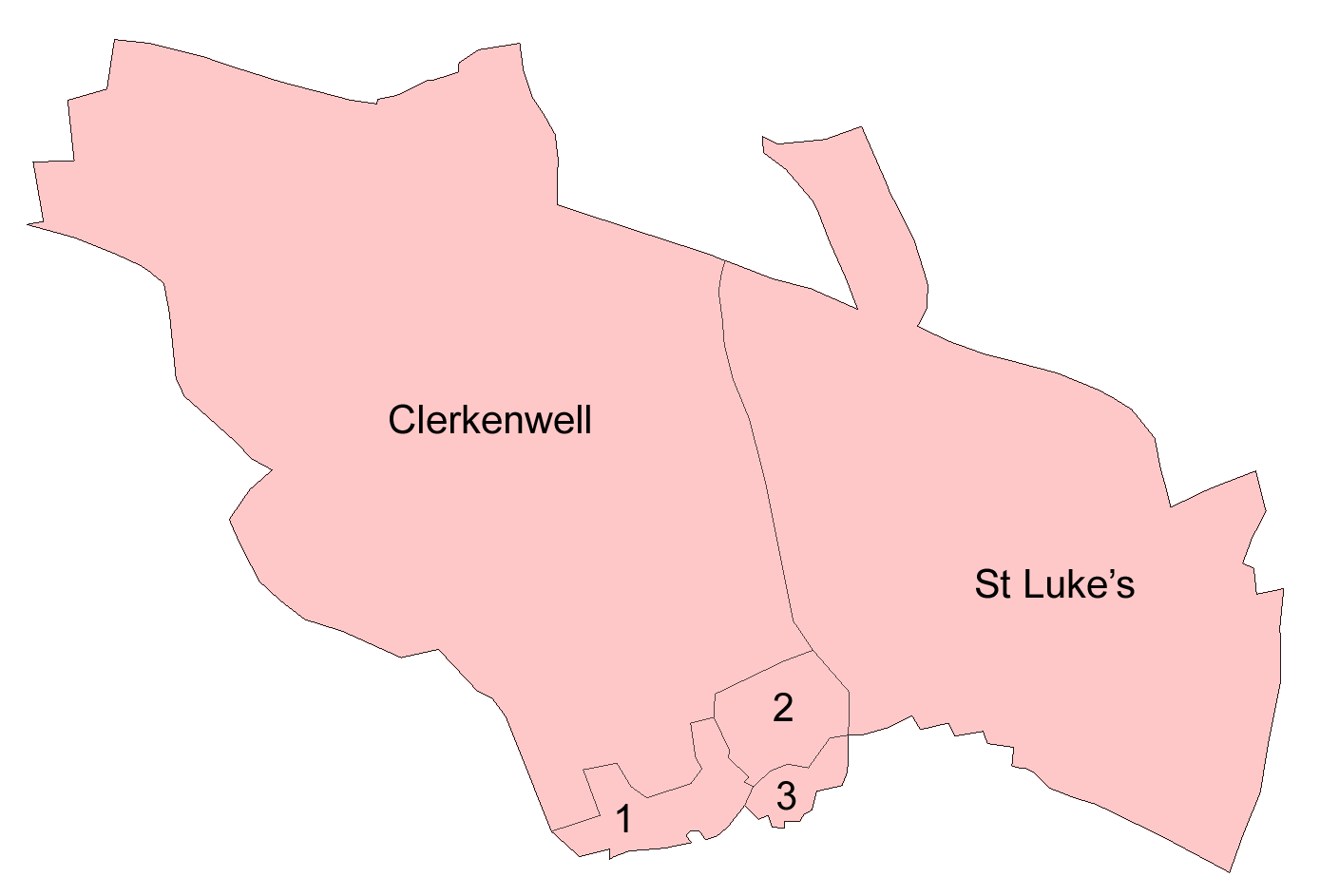
Parishes of Finsbury borough in 1911, showing St. Luke's in the east

From 1889 it was part of the County of London. The vestry administered local government in the area until the civil parish became part of the Metropolitan Borough of Finsbury in 1899. On 1 April 1915 the parish was abolished to form Finsbury. At the 1911 census (the last before the abolition of the parish), St Luke had a population of 28,976. In 1965, Finsbury borough was amalgamated with the Metropolitan Borough of Islington to form the London Borough of Islington.

The eponymous parish church closed in 1959 after its structure was found to be unsafe, and the parish reunited with St Giles-without-Cripplegate. The church building has been restored and is now home to a concert hall and rehearsal space used by the London Symphony Orchestra.

== Geography ==
The area of the former parish extends north from the City of London boundary to City Road, with a small part, around City Road Basin lying north of City Road. Goswell Road forms the western boundary with Clerkenwell, while the areas northern and eastern boundaries with the Shoreditch area of the London Borough of Hackney area have been adopted by the London Borough of Islington. St Luke's is inside the London Congestion Charging Zone, the Ultra Low Emission Zone, and is located in Zone 1. The nearest tube and railway stations are Barbican, Farringdon and Old Street.

=== Street name etymologies ===
St Luke's has no formal boundaries. Those used here form a rough triangle: City Road and Finsbury Pavement/Finsbury Square to the east, the boundary with the City of London to the south, and Goswell Road to the west.

- Anchor Yard – after a former inn here of this name
- Angel Gate
- Baldwin Street – after Richard Baldwin, Treasurer at St Bartholomew's Hospital when the street was built in 1811
- Baltic Street East and Baltic Street West – the streets here were built by a timber merchant c. 1810, who named them after trade-related activities; Baltic refers to the Baltic softwood trade
- Banner Street – after the Banner family, late 18th-century landowners in the area
- Bartholomew Square – built in 1811 on land owned by St Bartholomew's Hospital
- Bastwick Street – unknown; possibly after Bastwick in Norfolk
- Bath Street – after the former Peerless Pool here, later turned into a bath; it was formerly Pest House Row, after a plague hospital built here in the Tudor era (demolished 1736)
- Beard Street
- Bunhill Row – after the adjacent Bunhill Fields cemetery, the original phrase being 'bone hill'
- Cahill Street – thought to be named after a trustee of the Peabody Donation Fund, who redeveloped this former slum area in the 1880s
- Cayton Place and Cayton Street – renamed, after the village in Yorkshire, from New Street in 1805, to avoid confusion with other streets of this name
- Central Street – named thus in 1861, for it lay in the centre of St Luke's Parish
- Chequer Street – after the former Chequers tavern here
- Cherry Tree Walk
- Chiswell Street – old term meaning stony/gravelly earthor a corruption of 'Choice Well', denoting a source of clean water
- City Road – as it connects Islington to the City of London
- Crescent Row – descriptive, after its shape
- Dingley Place and Dingley Road – after Charles Dingley, who instigated the construction of City Road in 1756
- Domingo Street – the streets here were built by a timber merchant c. 1810, who named them after trade-related activities; Domingo is an alternative name for Hispaniola, a source of mahogany
- Dufferin Avenue and Dufferin Court – thought to be named after a trustee of the Peabody Donation Fund, who redeveloped this former slum area in the 1880s
- Errol Street – thought to be named after a trustee of the Peabody Donation Fund, who redeveloped this former slum area in the 1880s
- Europa Place – unknown
- Exchange Street – after the former Clerkenwell Telephone Exchange
- Featherstone Street – after the Featherstone family, local landowners after Matthew Featherstone bought land here in 1732
- Finsbury Pavement, Finsbury Square and Finsbury Street – after a Saxon burgh (settlement) owned by someone called Finn
- Fortune Street – after the Fortune Playhouse, which formerly stood here on the junction with Golden Lane; it was closed in 1648
- Fredericks's Row
- Galway Street – after Henri de Massue, Earl of Galway, first governor of the French Hospital that was formerly here
- Gard Street – after a member of the nearby Orphan Working School
- Garrett Street – after a person of this name who was a member of the local parish vestry Works Committee
- Gee Street – after its 1784 builder, Osgood Gee
- George Gillett Court – for George Gillett, local politician in the early 20th century
- Golden Lane – formerly Goldynglane, thought to be after a local property owner of the name Golding/Golda
- Goswell Road – there is dispute over the origins of the name, with some sources claiming the road was named after a nearby garden called 'Goswelle' or 'Goderell' which belonged to Robert de Ufford, 1st Earl of Suffolk, while others state it derives from "God's Well", and the traditional pagan practice of well-worship, or a former 'Gode Well' located here
- Hall Street – after James and Joseph Hall, who built the street in 1822
- Helmet Row – after the Worshipful Company of Ironmongers, who owned this land; its coat of arms incorporates a helmet motif
- Honduras Street – the streets here were built by a timber merchant c. 1810, who named them after trade-related activities; Honduras was a source of mahogany
- Hull Street – after its 18th-century builder, William Hulls
- Ironmonger Passage and Ironmonger Row – after the Worshipful Company of Ironmongers, who owned this land
- King Square – built 1820, and named for George IV
- Lamb's Buildings and Lamb's Passage – after its early 19th-century owner William (or Thomas) Lamb; it was formerly known as Great Swordbearers Alley
- Lever Street – unknown
- Lizard Street – after the Worshipful Company of Ironmongers, who owned this land; their arms incorporates a salamander motif
- Ludlow Street – unknown
- Macclesfield Road – after George Parker, 4th Earl of Macclesfield, chairman of the canal company in the 17th century
- Mallow Street – after the former mallow field located here
- Martha's Buildings
- Masons Place and Masons Yard
- Memel Court and Memel Street – the streets here were built by a timber merchant c. 1810, who named them after trade-related activities; Memel was a timber-exporting port in Germany (now Klaipėda in Lithuania)
- Mitchell Street – after John Mitchell, who bequeathed this land to the Worshipful Company of Ironmongers in 1527
- Moor Lane – after the marshy moorlands that formerly stood here
- Mora Street – after the prebend of Moor/Mora, belonging to St Paul's Cathedral, named for the local moors
- Moreland Street – after the Moreland family, prominent locally in the 19th century
- Mount Mills – after a former mount here supporting a windmill, later a chapel, and then in the Civil War a raised battery; it was levelled in 1750
- Nag's Head Court – after a former inn of this name
- Nelson Passage – after Admiral Horatio Nelson
- New Charles Street – as this formerly led to a Charles Street, named for Charles II
- Norman Street – after bricklayer William Norman, who leased land here in the 1750s
- Old Street – after its age, thought to have ultimately Roman origins
- Paton Street – unknown
- Pear Tree Street – after the pear trees formerly grown here
- Peerless Street – site of the Peerless Pool, a bath used in the 18th century, thought to be a corruption of ‘perilous’
- Pickard Street – after a clergyman of this name who founded the Orphan Working School here in 1754
- President Street
- Radnor Street – after the Earls of Radnor, who governed the French Hospital that was formerly here
- Red Cow Lane
- Ropemaker Street – descriptive, after the rope making trade formerly located here
- Roscoe Street – thought to be named after a trustee of the Peabody Donation Fund, who redeveloped this former slum area in the 1880s
- St Agnes Well – after an ancient well thought to have been located about 200 metres to the east, at the junction of Old Street and Great Eastern Street. Remnants of the well can be found within Old Street station.
- St Luke's Close – after the adjacent St Luke Old Street church
- Seward Street – after Edward Seward, who owned a dyeworks here in the 18th century
- Sidney Grove
- Sundial Court
- Sutton's Way
- Sycamore Street – by association with the nearby Timber Street, or possibly after an inn of this name
- Timber Street – the streets here were built by a timber merchant c. 1810, who named them after trade-related activities
- Wakley Street – after 19th-century surgeon and social reformer Thomas Wakley
- Warwick Yard – unknown
- Whitecross Street – after a white cross which stood near here in the 1200s
- Withers Place – after William Withers, 18th-century property owner
- Youngs Buildings – after Francis Young, local 18th-century property owner

=== Whitecross Street Market ===
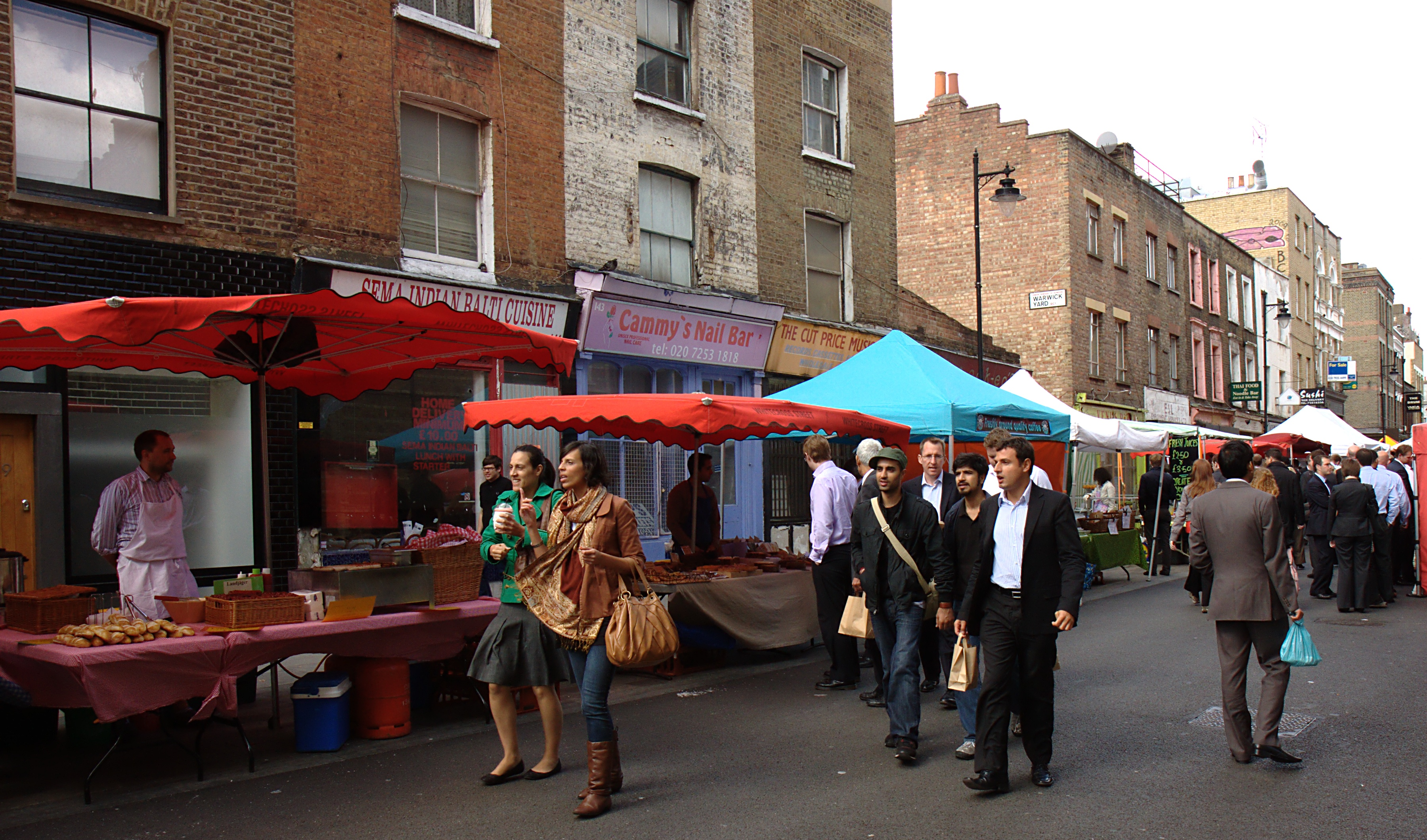
Whitecross Street Market

Whitecross Street Market is a market with stalls arranged in Whitecross Street and the road closed to traffic. There is a small general market every weekday, and a larger food market on Thursdays and Fridays. It has occasional food festivals.

The market dates to the 17th century, and was formerly one of London's great Sunday markets, although today trading is largely limited to lunchtimes. By the end of the 19th century, the area had become a by-word for poverty and alcohol abuse. It became known as Squalors' Market.

== St Luke's Parochial Trust ==
St Luke's Parochial Trust is an historic charity still operating in the St Luke's area, fulfilling its original purpose of improving the lives of local people. It has its origins in the gifts of land and money from benefactors to the ancient parish as far back as the 16th century. The charity owns and manages a busy community centre on Central Street, from which a wide range of community activities and services are delivered and coordinated.

The community centre was originally the Central Street Board School, one of many Victorian era schools built and managed by the London School Board. The school closed during the Second World War whilst local school children were evacuated to the countryside to avoid the Blitz. The school reopened and operated after the war as the Frank Barnes School for the Deaf until the mid-1970s. St Luke's Parochial Trust purchased the building in 1979, and converted it to a community centre which was opened by Queen Elizabeth II in 1982.

== Transport ==
The nearest stations are Barbican, Farringdon, Moorgate and Old Street London Underground Northern line (City branch) and the National Rail Northern City Line (which is operated by Great Northern) providing services at Old Street station on St Luke's eastern edge.
