= Zaspal Pave =

"Zaspal Pave" is a well-known Istrian folk song from Croatia. The title translates to "Paul fell asleep" in English. It is typically sung by two people, in the unique Istrian scale, without instrumental accompaniment.

== Lyrics ==
Croatian

Zaspal Pave pod orihom u hlade.
"Stani, Pave, rosa na te pade,
Rosa će ti košulju zmočiti."
"Nije meni za košulju moju,
Već je meni za lipotu moju!"

English translation

Paul fell asleep under a walnut tree in the shade.
"Get up, Paul, the dew is falling on you,
The dew will soak your shirt."
"I do not care about my shirt,
Only about my handsome face!"

== Sources ==
- Ivan Matetić Ronjgov (1990). Zaspal Pave: zbirka notnih zapisa narodnih pjesama Istre i Hrvatskog primorja (in Croatian).
