= Pavese =

Pavese may refer to:

Languages

- Pavese dialect, a variety of Southwestern Lombard language

People

- Paves, troubadour
- Cesare Pavese, Italian writer and poet

Places of Italy

- Pavese (territory), a territory of the Province of Pavia, Lombardy
- Oltrepò Pavese, a territory of the Province of Pavia, Lombardy

Other

- Zuppa pavese, a soup
