= Paver =

Paver or Pavers may refer to:

== Surname ==
- Kenneth Paver (1903–1975), English cricketer
- Michelle Paver (born 1960), British novelist
- Robert Paver (born 1952), Australian former rower, dermatologist and surgeon
- Roland Paver (born 1950), South African former cricketer

== Other uses ==
- Paver (flooring), a multi-shaped, multi-colored piece of brick, concrete or tile
- Paver (vehicle), a road construction vehicle
- Pavers Shoes, a family-owned footwear business operating in the UK and Ireland

== See also ==
- Pave (disambiguation)
