= Metropolitan Borough of Finsbury =

Former local authority in London

Coordinates: 51.5268°N 0.1080°W

Finsbury
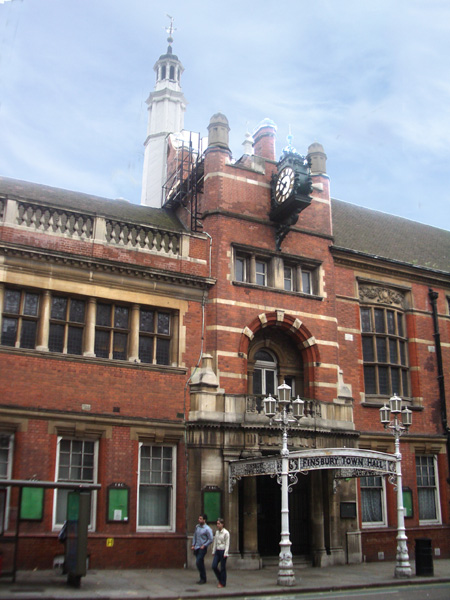
- Finsbury Town Hall

- Finsbury within the County of London
- Area
  - 1911/1931: 587 acres (2.38 km^{2})
  - 1931: 586 acres (2.37 km^{2})
- Population
  - 1911: 87,923
  - 1931: 69,888
  - 1931: 32,887
- Density
  - 1911: 150/acre
  - 1931: 119/acre
  - 1931: 56/acre
- History
  - Created: 1900
  - Abolished: 1965
  - Succeeded by: London Borough of Islington
- Status: Metropolitan borough (1900—1965); Civil parish (1915—1965)
- Government: Finsbury Borough Council
  - HQ: Rosebery Avenue
  - Motto: Altiora Petimus (We seek higher things)
- Coat of arms granted in 1931
- Subdivisions
  - Type: Civil parish
  - Units: Charterhouse (2); Clerkenwell; Glasshouse Yard (3); St Luke's; St Sepulchre (1)
- Map of borough boundary

The Metropolitan Borough of Finsbury was a metropolitan borough within the County of London from 1900 to 1965, when it was amalgamated with the Metropolitan Borough of Islington to form the London Borough of Islington.

It was the second smallest of the 28 boroughs within the County of London, stretching from Finsbury Pavement and Square northwest towards King's Cross, splitting The Angel as well as including Farringdon station and the GPO complex at Mount Pleasant.

== Formation and boundaries ==
The borough was formed from five civil parishes and extra-parochial places: Charterhouse, Liberty of Glasshouse Yard, St James & St John Clerkenwell, St Luke Middlesex and St Sepulchre Middlesex. In 1915 these five were combined into a single civil parish called Finsbury, which was conterminous with the metropolitan borough.

Previous to the borough's formation it had been administered by three separate local bodies: Holborn District Board of Works, Clerkenwell Vestry and St Luke's Vestry. Charterhouse had not been under the control of any local authority prior to 1900.

The borough covered the areas of Finsbury, Moorfields, Clerkenwell, and St Luke's. It bordered Islington, Shoreditch, the City of London, Holborn and St Pancras.

== Town Hall ==
The metropolitan borough was administered from Finsbury Town Hall on Rosebery Avenue. The building was built as the headquarters of Clerkenwell Vestry, and had been officially opened on 14 June 1895 by Lord Rosebery, the Prime Minister. The architect was C Evans Vaughan, and it was described by Nikolaus Pevsner as a "nice irregular brick building with Tudor windows and lantern". Finsbury Town Hall is now home to the Urdang Academy, a successful performing arts college.

== Population and area ==
Although metropolitan boroughs only dated from 1900, the London County Council compiled statistics in 1901 that show the population growth in London over the preceding century.

The area of the borough in 1901 was 587 acres (2.4 km^{2}). The populations recorded in National Censuses were:

Constituent parishes 1801-1899

| Year | 1801 | 1811 | 1821 | 1831 | 1841 | 1851 | 1861 | 1871 | 1881 | 1891 |
| Population | 55,515 | 68,811 | 86,223 | 100,521 | 112,938 | 125,360 | 129,031 | 124,766 | 119,382 | 111,225 |

Metropolitan Borough 1900-1961

| Year | 1901 | 1911 | 1921 | 1931 | 1941 | 1951 | 1961 |
| Population | 101,463 | 87,923 | 75,995 | 69,888 | | 35,370 | 32,887 |

By comparison, after amalgamation with Islington, to form the modern London Borough of Islington, the combined area became 14.86 km^{2} - approximately 3,672 acres (14.86 km^{2}); in 2005, this had a population of 182,600, or a population density of 12,288/km^{2}. In 1901 Finsbury, the population density was 42,276/km^{2}.

== Coat of arms ==
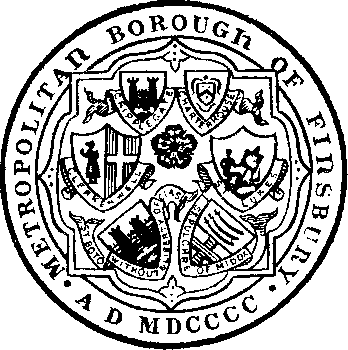
Device adopted in 1900

When the borough was incorporated in 1900, the corporation adopted a complicated device bearing six shields for each of the constituent parishes and extra-parochial places from which it was formed.

At the top were shields depicting the old Cripplegate of the City of London and the arms of Charterhouse.

At the centre of the seal, on the left, is the shield of Clerkenwell Vestry. The parish church was dedicated to Ss. James and John, and the shield showed St. James on the left and the cross of St. John on the right.

To the right of this was the emblem of St Luke's parish: as patron saint of artists, Luke was shown seated at an easel.

At the left base of the seal was a depiction of the gate of St. Botolph, representing the Liberty of Glasshouse Yard.

The design was completed by the shield of the parish vestry of St. Sepulchre. This parish was originally partly in the City of London, and partly in the county of Middlesex, and the shield combined the arms used bt the city and county.

In 1931 the borough received a grant of arms from the College of Arms. This also included references to Finsbury's constituent parts, but in a more unified design. The shield had the cross of St John, on which were placed a heraldic fountain for the New River and roundels and rings from the arms of Charterhouse School. At the top of the shield was a representation of the city wall and its gates.

The crest on top of the helm was for St Sepulchre's parish, the shield held by the hand again combining elements of the arms of the City of London and Middlesex.

The supporters were a winged bull, emblem of St. Luke; and an heraldic dolphin, symbol of St. James. The dolphin supporter was "charged" with a well in reference to Clerkenwell.

The Latin motto chosen by the borough was Altiora Petimus or We seek higher things.

== Politics ==
A map showing the wards of Finsbury Metropolitan Borough as they appeared in 1952

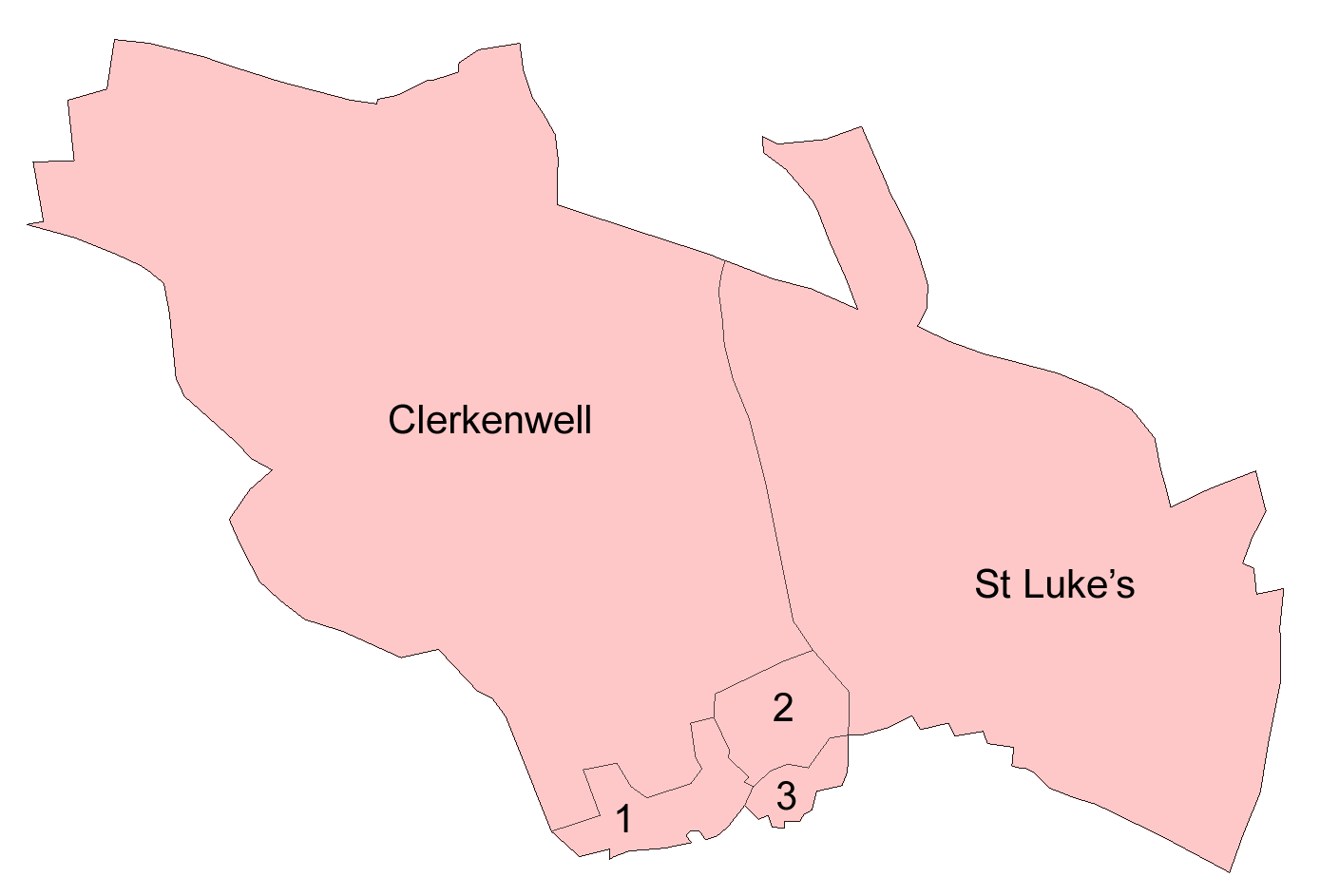
Civil parishes in 1911

The borough was divided into eleven wards for elections: City Road East, City Road West, East Finsbury, Old Street, Pentonville, St James', St John's, St Mark's, St Phillip's, St Sepulchre and West Finsbury.

=== Borough council ===
The first borough council was elected on 1 November 1900, when Conservative-supported Unionist and Moderate candidates took control. From 1903 to 1906 the Progressive Party held power. From 1906 to 1925 the Municipal Reform Party (allied to the Conservatives) controlled the borough. In 1925 a Ratepayer's Association stood in place of the Municipal Reformers, replacing them as majority party. From 1928 to 1931, the Labour Party held control, with the Ratepayers holding power from 1931 to 1934. In 1934 Labour regained power, which it held until the abolition of the borough in 1965.

The number of councillors returned at each election to the council was as follows:

Local elections

| Year | 1900 | 1903 | 1906 | 1909 | 1912 | 1919 | 1922 | 1925 | 1928 | 1931 | 1934 | 1937 | 1945 |
| Unionists | 14 | | | | | | | | | | | | |
| Moderates | 4 | | | | | | | | | | | | |
| Progressives | 10 | 32 | 14 | 8 | 5 | 17 | | | | | | | |
| Liberals | 5 | | | | | | | | | | | | |
| Independent | | | 1 | | 1 | | | | | | | | |
| Pro-conservatives | | 22 | | | | | | | | | | | |
| Municipal Reform | | | 34 | 46 | 48 | 32 | 47 | | | | | | 6 |
| Ratepayers Assoc | | | | | | | | 40 | 27 | 47 | 9 | 8 | |
| Labour | 1 | | | | | 5 | 7 | 14 | 29 | 9 | 47 | 48 | 47 |
| Unofficial Labour | | | | | | | | | | | | | 2 |
| Communist | | | | | | | | | | | | | 1 |

No Municipal Reform candidates were nominated after 1946, and Conservative candidates were nominated at local elections for the first time.

| Year | 1949 | 1953 | 1956 | 1959 | 1962 |
| Labour | | 24 | 37 | 29 | 32 |
| Conservative | | 5 | 2 | 5 | 2 |
| Vacancies | | 5 | | | |

=== Parliamentary constituency ===
For elections to Parliament, the borough initially formed the two constituencies of Finsbury Central and Finsbury East. In 1918 a new constituency of Finsbury was formed which was identical with the metropolitan borough. By 1950 the population of the borough had declined to such an extent that the Finsbury constituency was merged with the neighbouring constituency of Shoreditch to become Shoreditch and Finsbury.

== Archival records ==
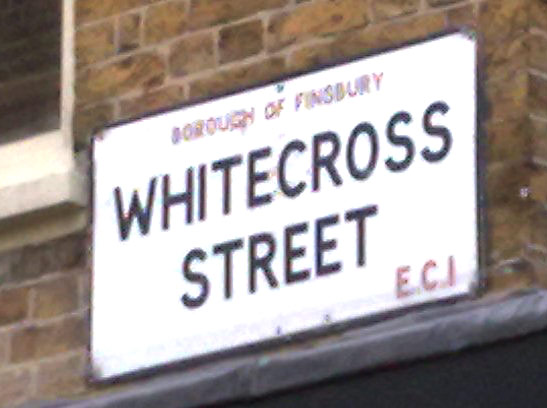
Surviving Borough of Finsbury road sign

Islington Local History Centre holds records of the Metropolitan Borough of Finsbury, including council and committee minutes, rate books, publications and photographs. There are some street nameplates which retain the label "Borough of Finsbury".

== See also ==
- Metropolis Management Act 1855
- London Government Act 1899
- London Government Act 1963
- London Borough of Islington
- List of mayors of Finsbury

== Sources ==
- Robert Donald, ed. (1907). "London: Finsbury". Municipal Year Book of the United Kingdom for 1907. London: Edward Lloyd.
- Census Tables for Metropolitan Borough of Finsbury, from Vision of Britain
- Crosley, Richard (1928) London's Coats of Arms and the Stories They Tell
- Beningfield, T. J. (1965) London 1900 - 1964: Armorial Bearings and Regalia of the London County Council, The Corporation of London and The Metropolitan Boroughs. Cheltenham & London: Ed. J. Burrow & Co.
