= Pau =

Pau or PAU may refer to:

== Places ==
- Pau (Aachen), a river in North Rhine-Westphalia, Germany
- PAU, an agricultural university in Punjab, India
- Pau (river), a river of south-western France (Gave de Pau)
- Pau, Edom, a city in the Bible
- Pau, Pyrénées-Atlantiques, France, a city
  - Arrondissement of Pau, a district containing the French city
- Pau, Sardinia, a municipality
- Pau, Spain, a municipality
- La Pau (Barcelona Metro), a station
- Lac Pau, a lake near Caniapiscau, Quebec, Canada - see Lac Pau (Caniapiscau) Water Aerodrome

== People ==
- Pau (given name)
- Pau (surname)
- Irmãs de Pau, Brazilian musical duo
- Maria de la Pau Janer (born 1966), Spanish writer

== Schools ==
- Pacific Adventist University, Papua New Guinea
- Palo Alto University, in Palo Alto, California, United States
- Polska Akademia Umiejętności, Polish Academy of Learning
- Prueba de Acceso a la Universidad, see Selectividad
- Punjab Agricultural University, India

== Other uses ==
- Pau (unit), a unit of capacity used in Brunei, Malaysia, Sabah, and Sarawak
- Pau Grand Prix, an auto race
- Pau FC, a French association football club
- Penetrating atherosclerotic ulcer (PAU) of the aorta
- pāʻū, Hawaiian feather skirt (see Feather cloak)
- PAU, IATA code for Pauk Airport, Burma
- pau, ISO 639 codes for the Palauan language
- Pau, alternative spelling for baozi (steamed Chinese buns), sometimes used in Malaysia
- Palestinian Affairs Unit, former name of the United States government office in Jerusalem managing Palestinian relations
- Power of Africans Unity, a South African political party
- Polska Akademia Umiejętności (Polish Academy of Arts and Sciences), scientific organization
- Petroleum Authority of Uganda, regulator of the petroleum industry in Uganda.
