= Worshipful Company of Ironmongers =

Livery company of the City of London

Coordinates: 51.51826°N 0.09627°W

Ironmongers' Company
- Motto: God is our strength; Assher dure
- Location: London, EC2
- Order of precedence: 10th
- Master of company: Matthew Tilbury
- Website: www.ironmongers.org

The Worshipful Company of Ironmongers is one of the Great Twelve livery companies of the City of London, incorporated under a Royal Charter in 1463.

== History ==
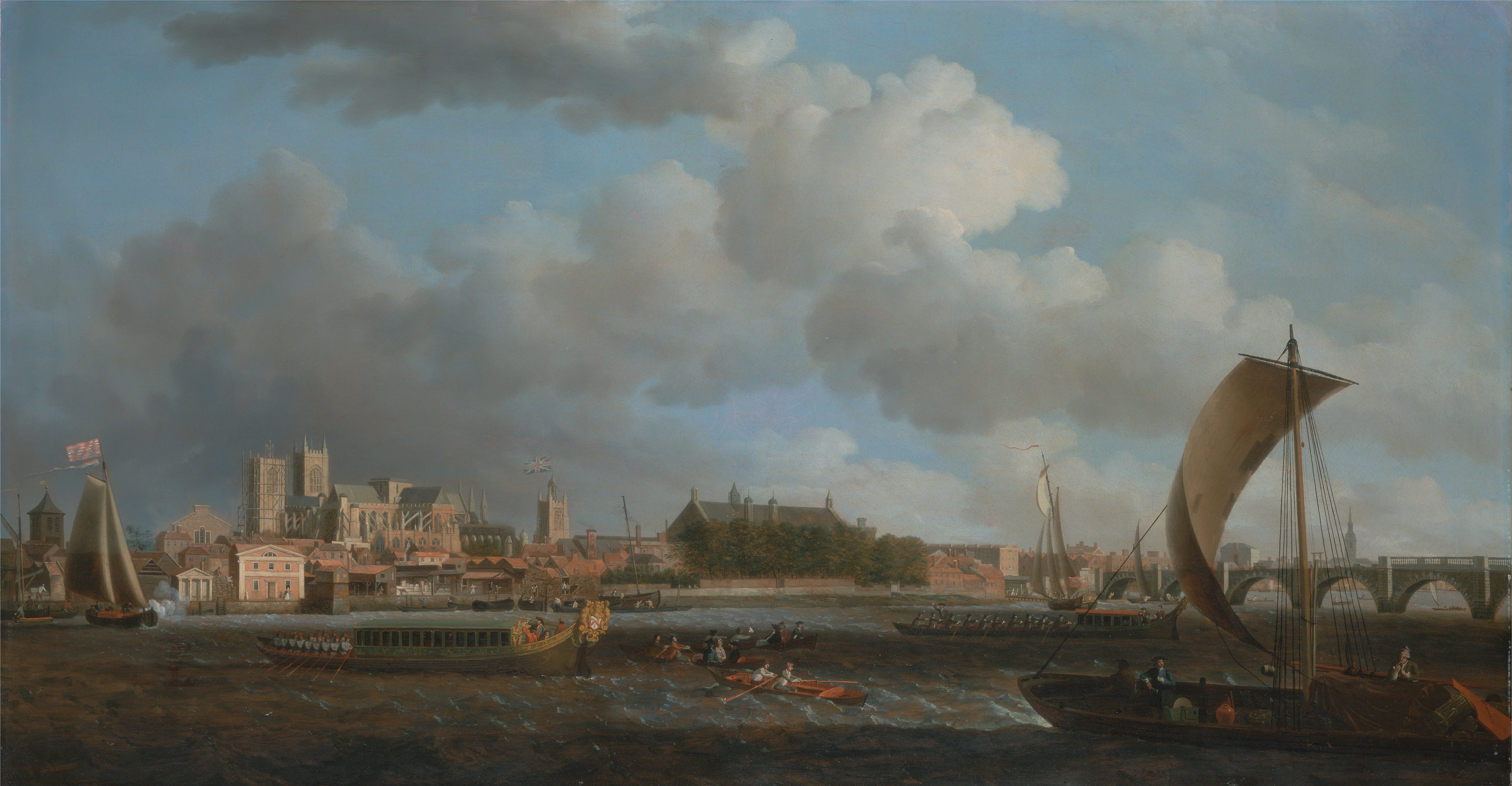
Ceremonial Barge of the Ironmongers' Company

The Ironmongers, originally known as the Ferroners, were incorporated under a Royal Charter in 1463. Their company's original association with iron merchants has lessened, especially due to the movement of the industry from Southern England to the North, where iron ore is more available. It is now primarily a charitable institution.

The Worshipful Company ranks tenth in the order of precedence among the City of London's Great Twelve City Livery Companies. Its motto is "God Is Our Strength".

== Hall ==
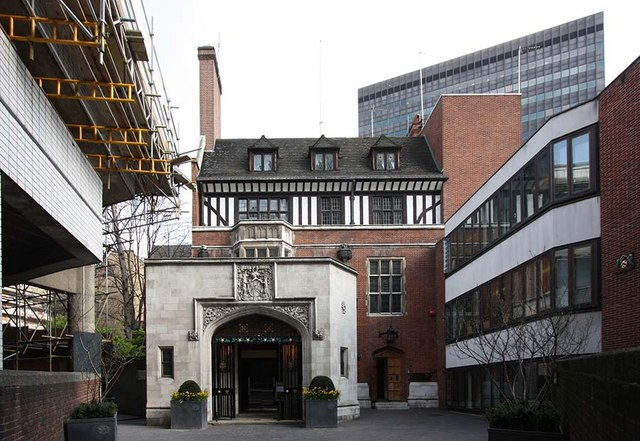
Entrance to Ironmongers' Hall

Ironmongers' Hall is the home of the Worshipful Company of Ironmongers. It is located in Aldersgate Street in the City of London. The first hall, dating back to 1457, was in Fenchurch Street; it was rebuilt in 1587 and rebuilt again in 1745 on the same site. The third hall was destroyed on 7 July 1917 by a bomb dropped during World War I. The present Hall stands on land which was bought in 1922: construction work, which was undertaken by Holland, Hannen & Cubitts, started that year and the Hall was opened on 17 June 1925.
