= Air suction valve =

An air suction valve (SAV) is a subsystem used to reduce emissions in the exhaust gases of internal combustion engines.

== Working principle ==
When an engine exhaust valve is open, the pressure in the exhaust manifold is higher than atmospheric pressure. The exhaust manifold is configured in such a way that positive and negative pulses are produced during the operation of the cycle by designing it as a diffuser.

The ASV has three openings: one is connected to the manifold vacuum, another is connected to the exhaust pipe and the third is open to the atmosphere. When a negative pulse is induced in the exhaust, air from the atmosphere enters the exhaust manifold through a one-way reed valve and serves to oxidize the carbon monoxide and hydrocarbons in the exhaust.

== Air cut valve system ==
This system consists of a spring-loaded diaphragm, and a shaft which is attached to the bottom. A manifold vacuum is applied over the diaphragm where the shaft end is towards the opening of the atmosphere.

During deceleration, the engine vacuum rises and acts against the spring to push the shaft downwards, thereby blocking the opening through which atmospheric air is passed to the exhaust.

Though there is a negative pulse during deceleration, the manifold vacuum blocks and cuts off the air to the exhaust manifold.

Used on the Honda Falcon NX4, mainly responsible for backfire or popping during deceleration when an open exhaust is added to the bike and if extra accessories is on vacuum circuit (Scottoiler, etc.).

This system is mainly used in Indian two wheeler which are manufactured by Hero Honda. The advantage of this system is low cost.

== Pulsed Air Valve ==
The Royal Enfield Bullet, from year 2006-current, uses an air suction valve to reduce emissions in its exhaust gases. Royal Enfield Motors calls their Air Suction Valve the PAV, or Pulsed Air Valve. Its function is the same, using a vacuum at the intake to trigger a valve that pulses atmospheric air into the exhaust. The original "iron barrel" style engine did this with a hose from the PAV going to the exhaust pipe, the newer (2003–2009) AVL aluminum engine pulses the gas directly into the exhaust port on the head of the engine itself.
