= Ivan Matetić Ronjgov =

Croatian composer (1880–1960)

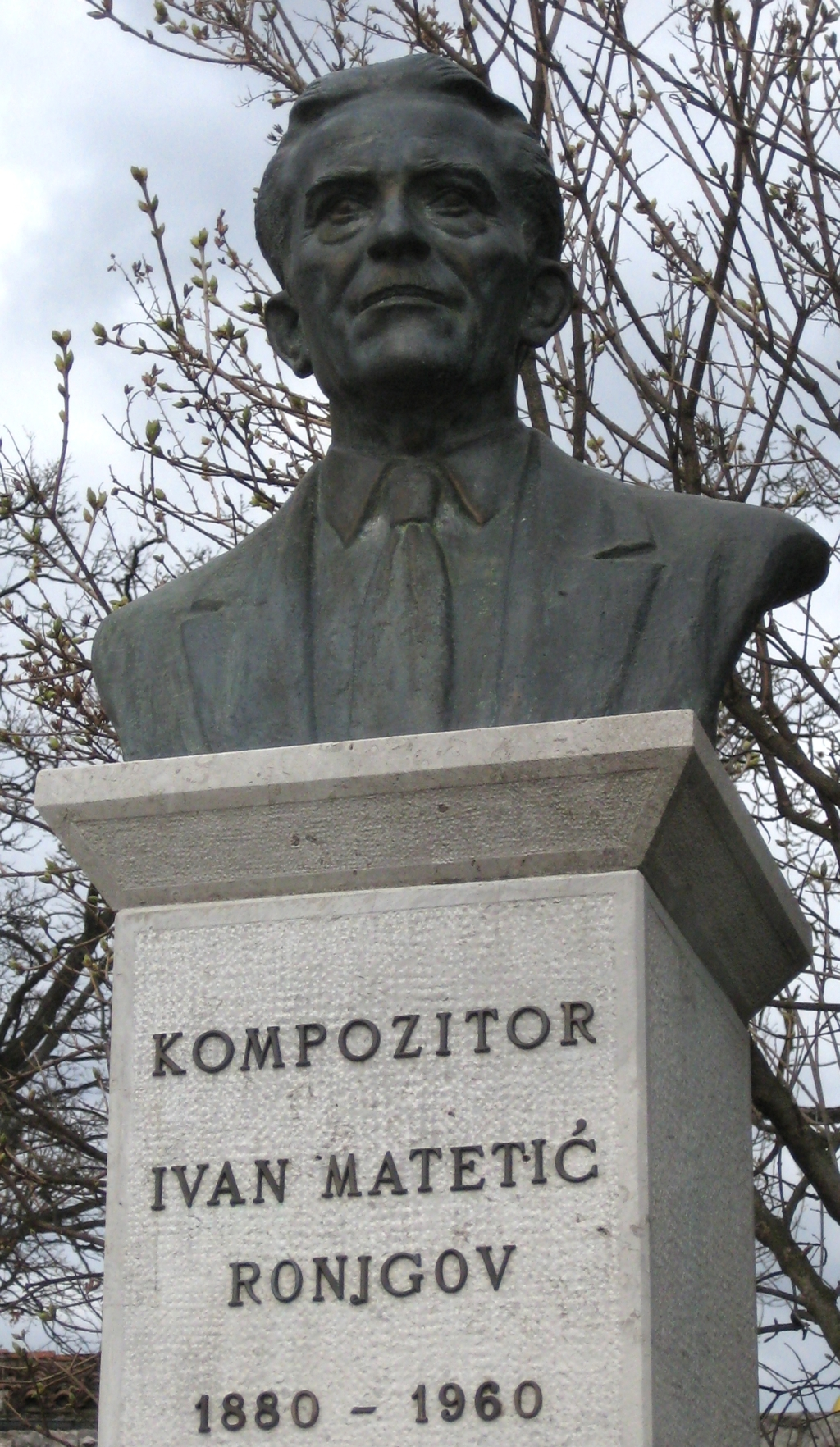
A bust of Ivan Matetić Ronjgov near his house in Ronjgi

Ivan Matetić Ronjgov (10 April 1880 – 27 June 1960) was an Istrian composer.

Ivan Matetić was born in Ronjgi, a village in present-day Croatia, from which he took his nickname "Ronjgov". He discovered the pattern of the music of the Istrian region, theoretically explaining the essence of this natural music and pinpointed the "Istrian scale" – a series of six tones and half-tones.

On the basis of this discovery, Matetić was able to document the folk songs of the Istrian region, to harmonize their notes, and finally to compose music in the same spirit. He left a large number of musical notations from Istria and the Croatian seaside. He harmonized and arranged over one hundred songs. His most significant compositional opus consists of some ten major compositions for various vocal groups, mainly for mixed choirs.

Works such as "Ćaće moj" ("My Papa"), "Roženice", "Mantinjada domaćemu kraju" ("Ode to our Homeland"), "Na mamin gorbak" ("Beside Mama's grave") are choral symphonies composed by Matetić.

== Sources ==
- "Matetić Ronjgov, Ivan". Croatian Encyclopedia (in Croatian). Miroslav Krleža Institute of Lexicography.
