= Pao language =

Pao may be:

- Pa'O language, native to Myanmar
- Tai Pao language, native to Vietnam
- Pao language (Venezuela) (unattested)
- Pao language (India) (spurious)

== See also ==
- The Languages of Pao
