= Istrian scale =

Musical scale

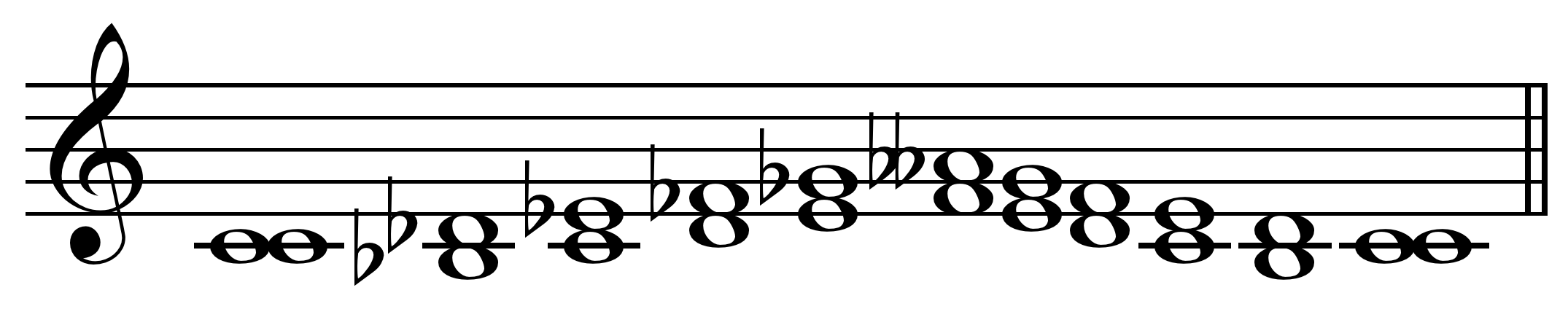
- Istrian mode on C. [heptatonic]
- Stylistic origins: Croatian music
- Cultural origins: Istria and Kvarner

Two-part singing and playing in the Istrian scale
- UNESCO Intangible Cultural Heritage
- Country: Croatia
- Reference: 00231
- Region: Europe and North America

Inscription history
- Inscription: 2009 (4th session)
- List: Representative

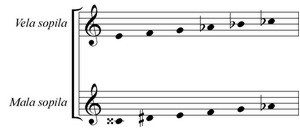
Sopilas: small/thin/high and great/fat/low

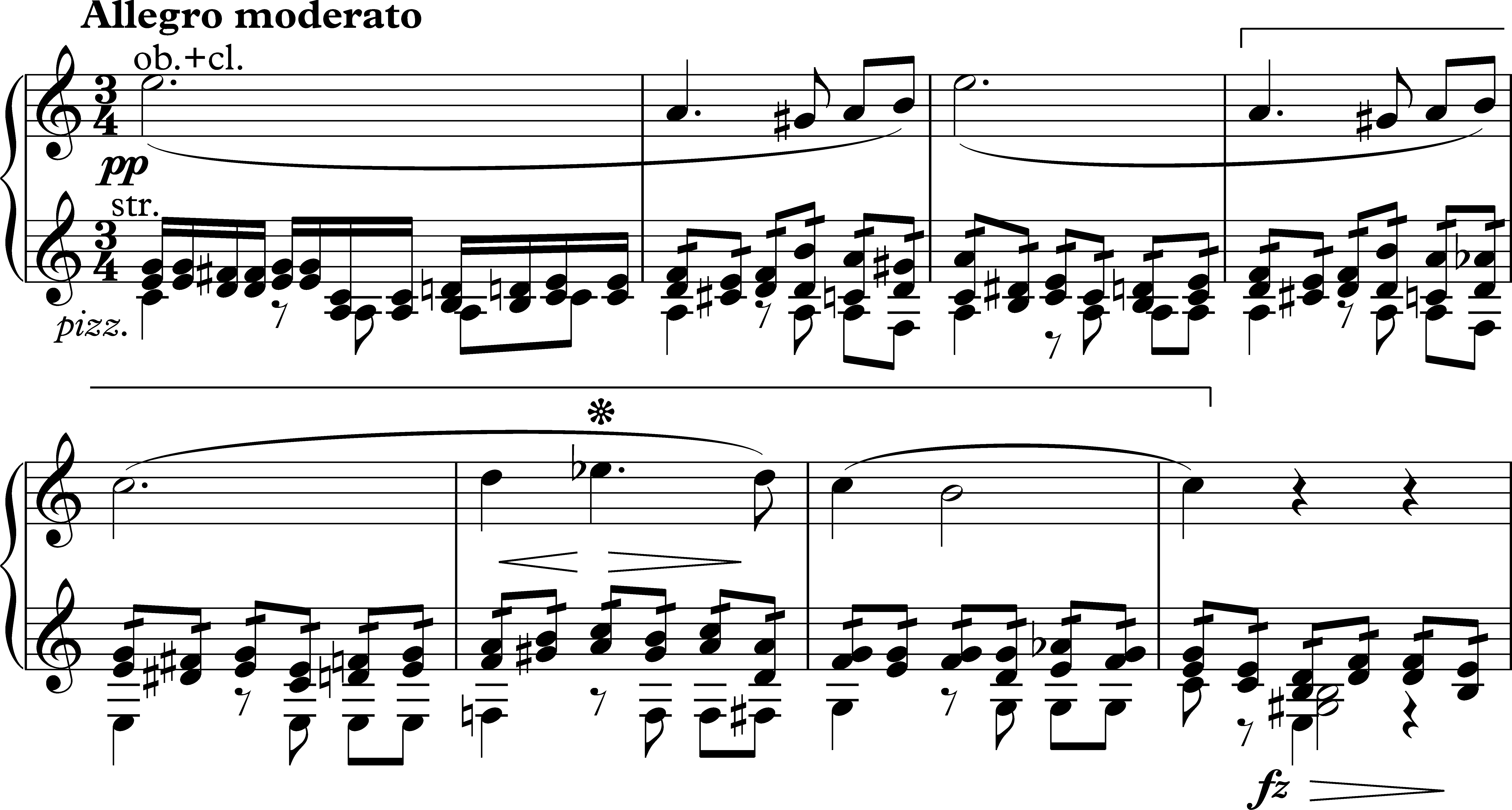
Istrian scale in Schubert's Symphony No. 8 in B minor (1922), 1st mvt., bars 13–20; flat fifth marked with asterisk

"Istrian scale" refers both to a "unique" musical scale and to the folk music genres from Istria and Kvarner which use that scale. It is named for the Istrian peninsula. Istrian folk music is based on a distinctive six-tone musical scale (the so-called Istrian scale), and the peninsula's two-part, slightly nasal singing. The two-part singing and playing in the Istrian scale, a traditional singing practice characteristic of the Istrian region and the north Adriatic coastal area and islands, was inscribed in UNESCO's List of Intangible Cultural Heritage in 2009.

Genres include kanat and tarankanje; techniques include nasal tone, variation and improvisation, and resolution to the unison or octave; and instruments include double reeds such as sopele, shawms, bagpipes, and other instruments such as flutes and tambura lutes. It was first named by Ivan Matetić Ronjgov early in the twentieth century, assisting his study and notation of Croatian music.

== Description ==
Non-equal-tempered, the scale could approximately be notated as: E-F-G-A♭-B♭-C♭ [hexatonic] (see: enharmonic), the first six notes of an octatonic scale on E. It may be thought of in various ways, such as the Gregorian Phrygian mode with lowered 4th, 5th, and 6th degrees (on E: E-F-G-A♭-B♭-C♭-D [heptatonic]). Performances feature diaphony and the Phrygian cadence (in E: F and D moving to E).

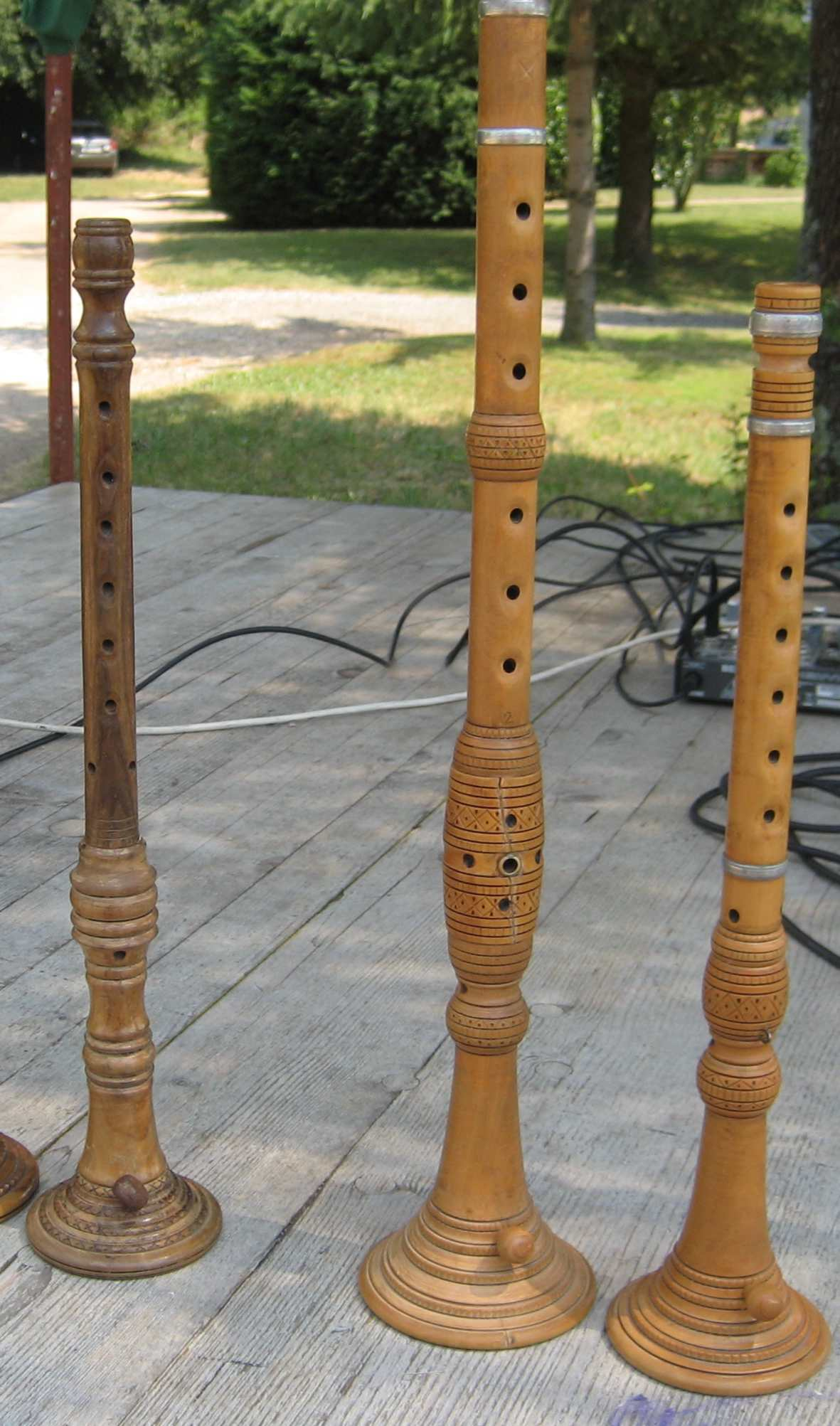
Sopilas

Though, "relative intonation var[ies] considerably from example to example [and between instruments]," the scale has also been described as derived from just intonation: subharmonics seven to fourteen (approximately D, E, F, G♭, A♭, B♭, C, D')( and with two voices).

In Haydn's String Quartet in F minor, Op. 20 No. 5, something like the Istrian mode, but without its top note, is found. Uroš Krek's Inventiones ferales (1962) uses the scale, "in a disguised manner". Tartini may have studied the scale, and Bartók took note of the scale. Karol Pahor's cycle of 15 pieces, Istrijanka (1950), was the result of study of the Istrian mode, as was Danilo Švara's Sinfonia da camera in modo istriano (1957). The Istrian mode occurs in Josip Štolcer-Slavenski's Balkanofonija (1927).

Throughout the areas of Istria and the Kvarner Gulf the distinctive vocal singing has spread, consisting of alternating half and whole steps, which, particularly in older singers' and instrumentalists' renditions, are untempered. The songs are sung by pairs of singers (male, female, or mixed) in a characteristic two-part polyphony in minor thirds (or major sixths) with a cadence to a unison or an octave. Singers distinguish the higher (na tanko "thin") part from the lower (na debelo "fat").

== See also ==
- hr:Ča-val
- Descant
