= Pau (surname) =

Pau is a surname. Notable people with the surname include:

- Akina Pau (born 1974), Hong Kong fencer
- Carlos Pau y Español (1857–1937), Spanish botanist
- Pau Cin Hau, Burmese religious leader
- Joan Margarit i Pau (died 1484), Spanish Roman Catholic bishop and cardinal
- Paul Pau (1848–1932), French general
- Peter Pau (born 1951), Hong Kong cinematographer
- Petra Pau (born 1963), German politician
- Sioe Gouw Pau (born 1935), Indonesian Olympic fencer
- Tyrone Pau, Cook Islander professional rugby league footballer
- Pau Shiu-hung (born 1942), Hong Kong politician
