= St Sepulchre (parish) =

Ancient parish in England

Coordinates: 51°31′N 0°6′W

St Sepulchre was an ancient parish which had its southern part within the boundaries of the City of London and its northern part outside. Its former area is now within the contemporary neighbourhoods of Smithfield, Farringdon and Clerkenwell.

This meant for civil uses (foremost of which are the charitable works led by its priest or its patron then from the Tudor reforms its vestry, then for some decades after secularist reforms, the waning system of civil parishes) it was divided into:

- St Sepulchre without Newgate in the Farringdon Without Ward of the City of London
- St Sepulchre Middlesex, a smaller zone, to the north, in Middlesex, from the modern boroughs' creation in 1965, part of the London Borough of Islington.

The ecclesiastical version today covers essentially the same land plus an extension to the south-east. It has one designated church, which is referred to as Holy Sepulchre London.

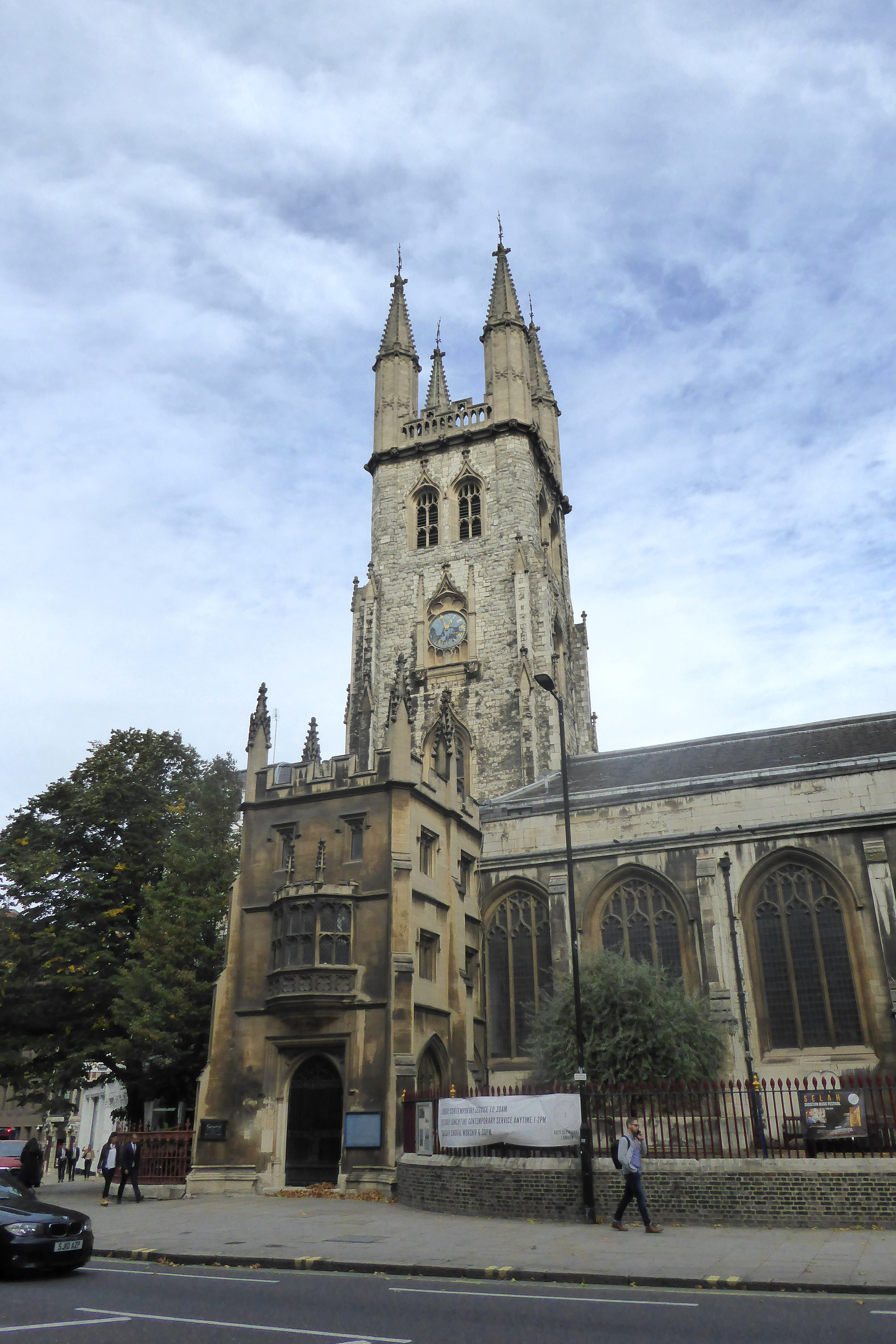
St Sepulchre-without-Newgate Church, in the City of London. The church is just to the west of the former Newgate, literally a new gate in the city wall and which served the national arterial road to and via Oxford.

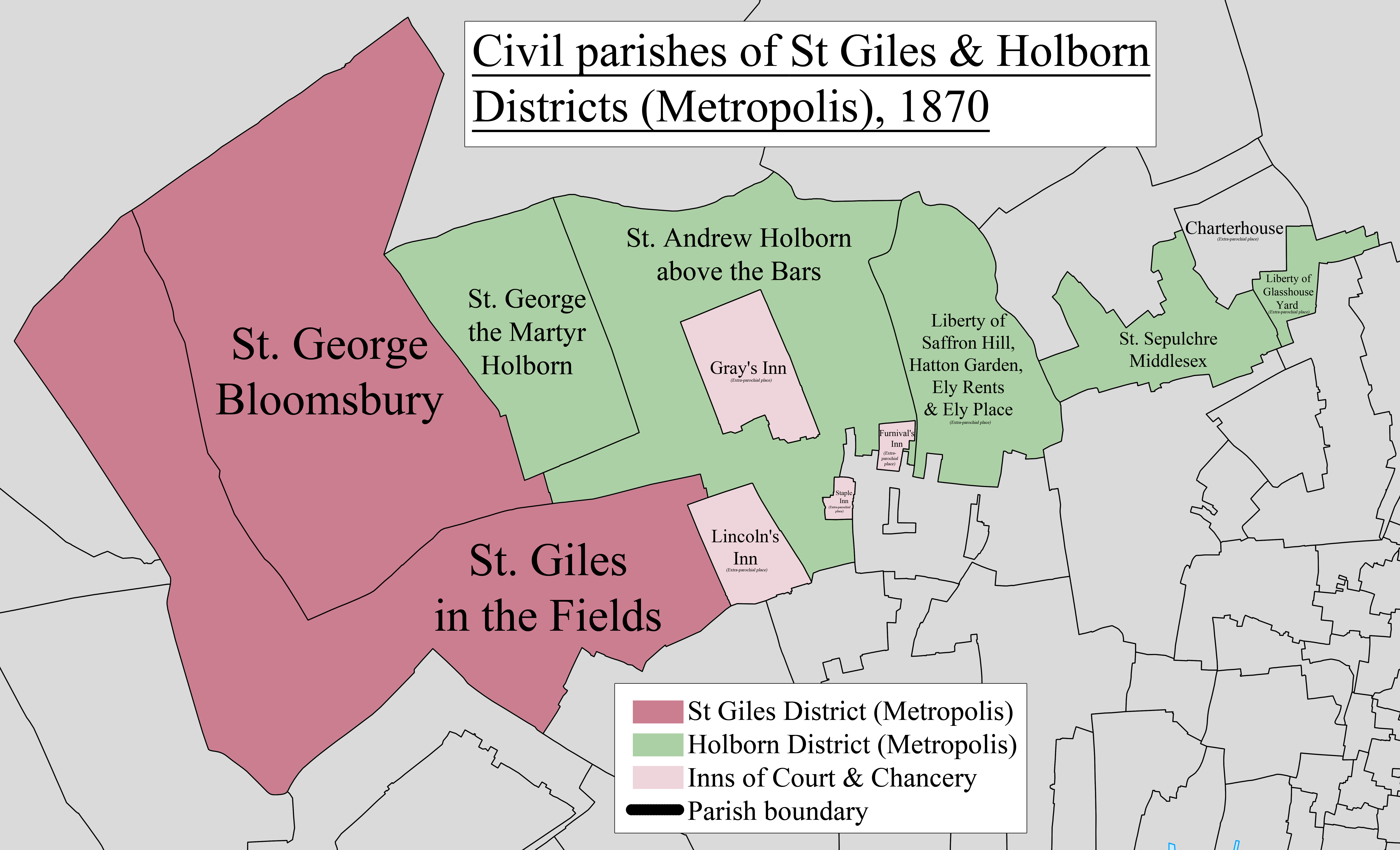
St Sepulchre Middlesex as part of the short-lived Holborn District (Metropolis), shown in green

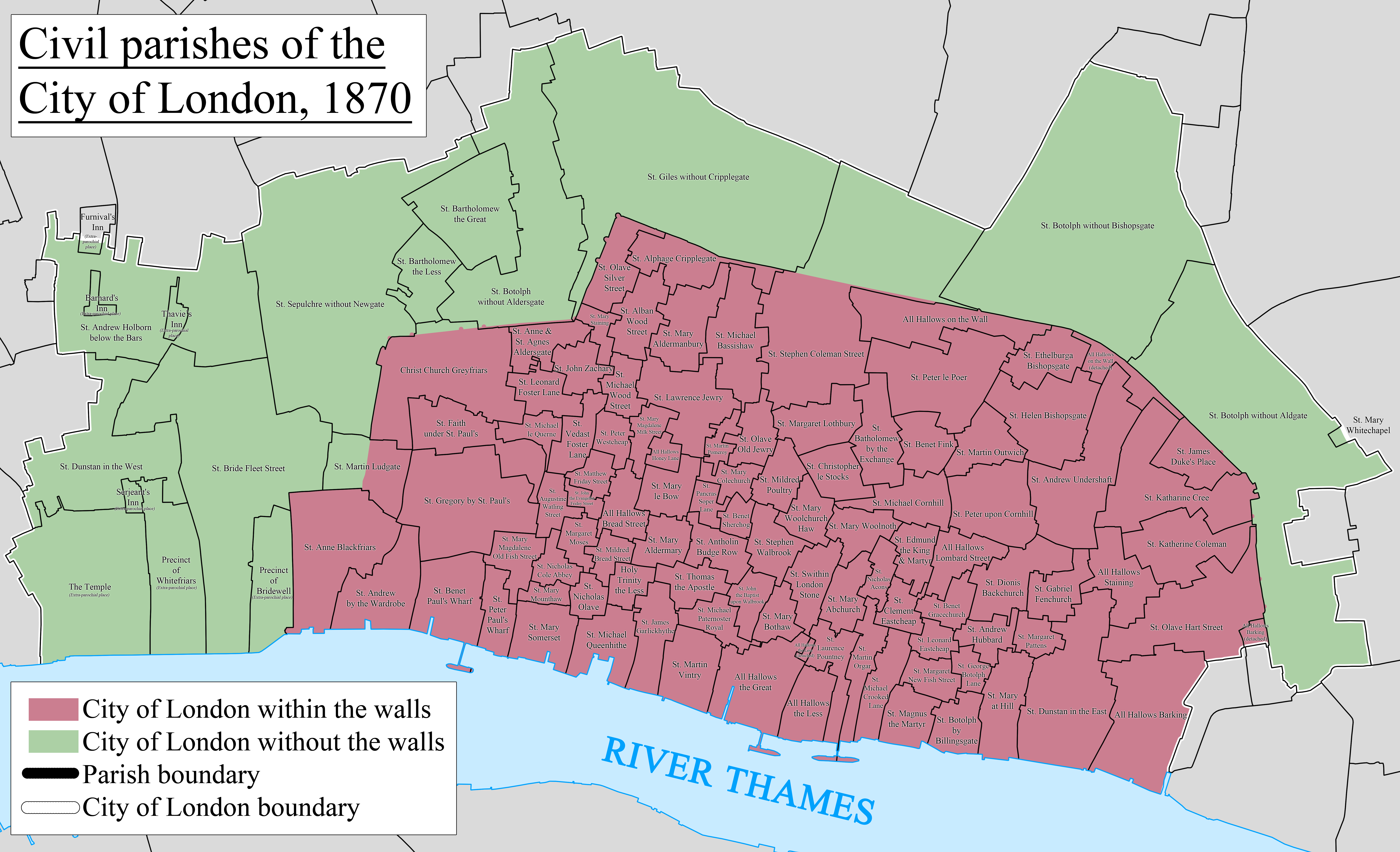
The extramural City parish of St Sepulchre without Newgate, in the west of the City of London

== Divided parish ==
The church of St Sepulchre-without-Newgate was established, probably in the early 1100s, immediately to the west of Newgate, one of the gates in London's Wall.

For civil purposes it was divided into two civil parishes, each called St Sepulchre, although the parish in the City of London was also known as St Sepulchre without Newgate.

The Fleet, a sewer covered by Farringdon Street and Farringdon Road, formed the western limit of all, with Holborn on the western bank.

=== An established division ===
The number of parishes in England grew as more churches were built, especially in the 11th and 12th centuries, leading to the sub-division of parishes, this process ended when the introduction of Canon Law, around 1180, made the sub-division of parishes, or even boundary changes, an onerous and infrequent event. At this point parishes took a settled form.

The extension of the authority of the City beyond the walls took place long before the Norman Conquest and long before the extramural area was settled to any significant degree. The City Wards were also taking shape before the Norman Conquest. The parish of St Sepulchre has therefore probably always been split into its City and northern divisions.

The northern boundary of the City in this area, and therefore the dividing line between the two parishes of St Sepulchre, was initially formed in part by the now culverted Fagswell Brook and once marked by boundary markers known as West Smithfield Bars which were in place by 1170. The City’s warped local limit, partially covered by Smithfield Market, has been rationalised to follow Charterhouse Street.

=== St Sepulchre without Newgate ===
The civil parish of St Sepulchre without Newgate was part of the Farringdon Without Ward of the City of London.

It remained part of the ecclesiastic parish after 1547 but the rest rejoined recently, as the church reduced down to the initial church, Holy Sepulchre, only. The ecclesiastical (Church of England) parish has all the names, reflecting this division then re-merger: St. Sepulchre with Christ Church Greyfriars and St. Leonard Foster Lane

=== St Sepulchre Middlesex ===
The civil parish of St Sepulchre Middlesex was part of the Ossulstone Hundred, and later the Finsbury Division, of Middlesex. The two civil parishes were united for ecclesiastical (church) purposes until 1547, when the Middlesex part was split off and merged with other areas to form a new separate new ecclesiastical parish.

The daughter ecclesiastical parish has been re-merged (into its parent). This area, has, since the 19th century, been generally viewed as part of Clerkenwell, though it has never been part of any Clerkenwell administrative or ecclesiastical unit. From 1547 St Sepulchre Middlesex broke off to become, for ecclesiastic purposes, a daughter ecclesiastical parish – since when it has been re-merged. This area, has, since the 19th century, been generally viewed as part of Clerkenwell, though it has never been part of any Clerkenwell administrative or ecclesiastical unit.

In 1900 it became part of the Metropolitan Borough of Finsbury, and in 1965 part of the London Borough of Islington.

== End of the civil parish and the successor ecclesiastically ==
The civil parish in the City of London was abolished in 1907, with the civil parish in what is now the London Borough of Islington following in 1915.

The ecclesiastical parish, for a few centuries limited to the City from 1547, saw merger in 1954 with two small parishes to the south-east. It became the successor of about 95% of the original land, plus this extension, as St Sepulchre with Christ Church, Greyfriars and St Leonard, Foster Lane. It has one church, which is known as Holy Sepulchre London. The very slight loss of parish land affects a strip leading towards and particularly a parcel close to Barbican tube station. Parishioners are, however, today free to worship wherever they wish. The church has had a low church (protestant) liturgy since the Marian persecutions saw the execution of its vicar in 1555 and is the largest church (non-cathedral) in the City of London.

== Population ==
St Sepulchre, City of London

Year	1871	1881	1891	1901
Population	3,701	2,166	1,754	1,160

St Sepulchre, Middlesex

Year	1871	1881	1891	1901	1911
Population	2,888	2,392	1,972	1,503	1,192
