= Finsbury Pavement =

Street in London

Coordinates: 51°31′11″N 0°5′15″W

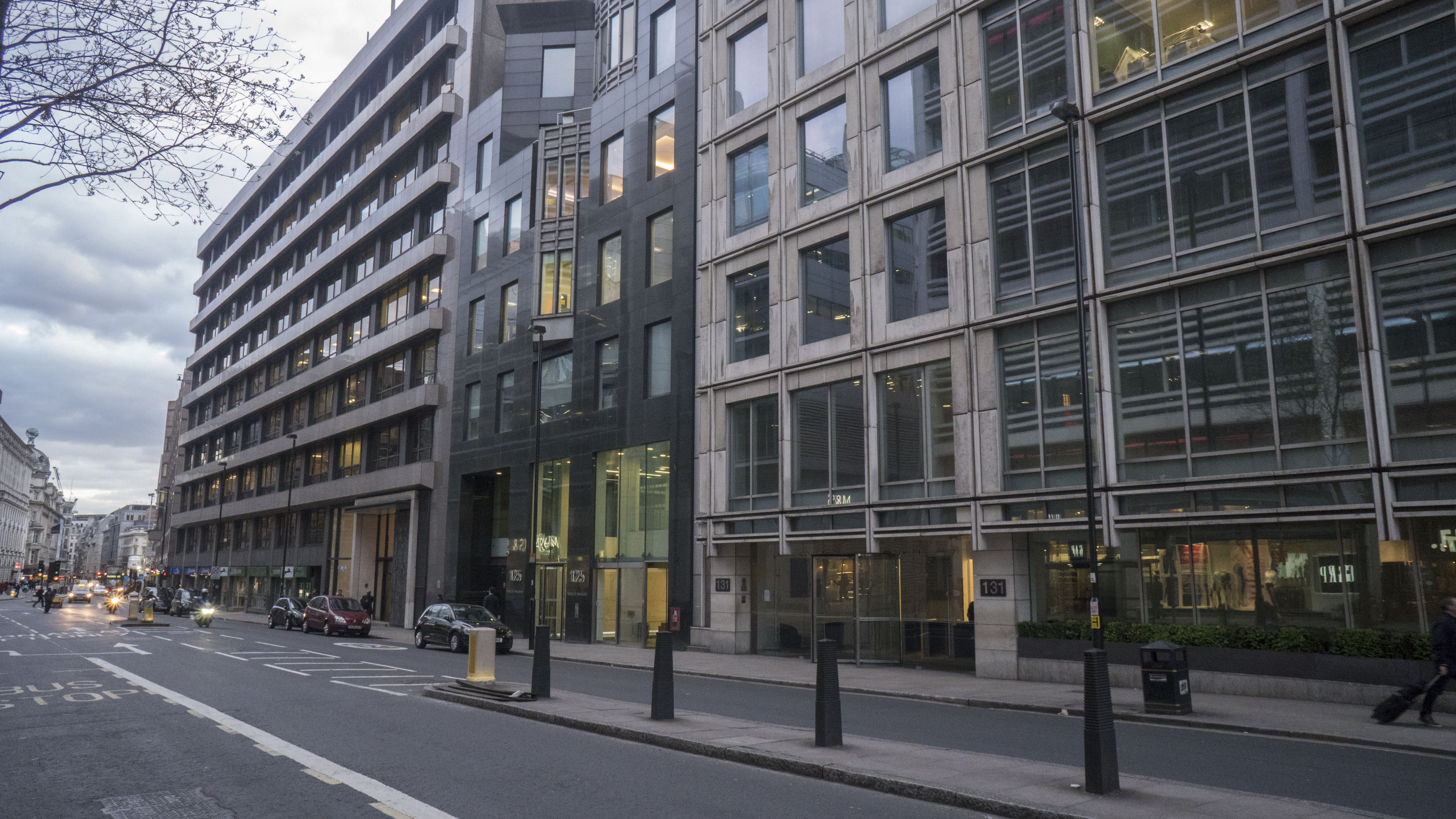
Finsbury Pavement

Finsbury Pavement is a short length of street in England connecting Moorgate with City Road in the London Borough of Islington. It forms a part of the London Inner Ring Road (as the A501 road), and before the introduction of the ring of steel around the City of London it formed a major through-route towards London Bridge and south London.

== History ==
The name was formerly Moor Fields Pavement, being on the west side of the Moorfields, behind the Bethlem Hospital. Its current name derives from lying within the historic manor of Finsbury, the manor forming one of the prebends of St Paul's Cathedral, and becoming the Metropolitan Borough of Finsbury, in 1900. The area was first drained in 1527, and the existing postern made into a gate in the city wall at Moorgate. In the early 19th century, the southern end of the street was renamed Moorgate, by the City of London – and the name change marked the boundary, but today, due to boundary changes, most of the street is within the city's Coleman Street ward.

By 1761, the Islington turnpike trust built City Road, to meet Finsbury Pavement from the city. The street formed an early terminus for coach traffic from the north, and in 1871, the street became the terminus for tramways running from Islington. In 1891, Finsbury Pavement became the City terminus for the Great Northern & City underground railway serving Finsbury Park, via the Copenhagen Fields tunnel, under Islington. This line was taken over by London Underground in 1913, as a part of the Northern line's Highbury branch, and the terminus extended to Moorgate station. This branch was never integrated with the underground system, and is now operated as the Northern City Line, a suburban service.

In 1825, George Batty and his wife founded Batty & Co, a condiments manufacturer, at Finsbury Pavement. The company later established a large manufacturing plant in Peckham, which became the United Kingdom's first manufacturing base of H. J. Heinz Company in 1905.

As well as Moorgate, the closest mainline railway station is Liverpool Street, a short distance to the east which also has an integrated London Underground station.

== See also ==
- Finsbury Circus
- Barbican Centre
- Museum of London
- Bunhill Fields
- Chiswell Street
