= London Borough of Islington =

Coordinates: 51°32′N 0°08′W

- London borough
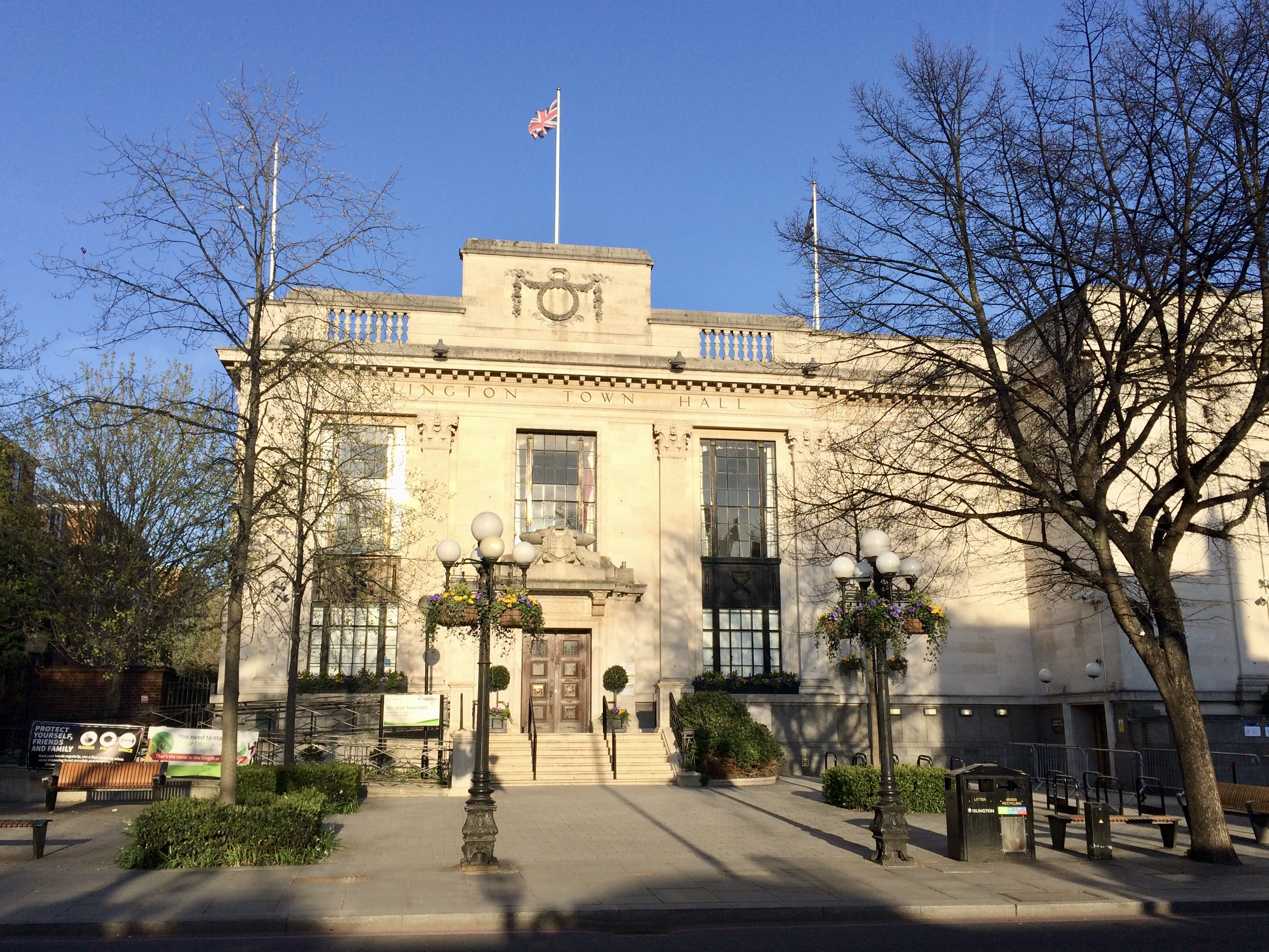
- Islington Town Hall

- Flag Coat of arms Council logo
- Motto: We Serve
- Islington shown within Greater London
- Sovereign state: United Kingdom
- Constituent country: England
- Region: London
- Ceremonial county: Greater London
- Created: 1 April 1965
- Admin HQ: Islington Town Hall, Upper Street, Islington

Government
  - Type: London borough council
  - Body: Islington London Borough Council
  - London Assembly: Sem Moema (Labour) AM for North East
  - MPs: Jeremy Corbyn (Your Party); Emily Thornberry (Labour)

Area
  - Total: 5.74 sq mi (14.86 km^{2})
  - Rank: 294th (of 296)

Population (2025)
  - Total: 224,551
  - Rank: 87th (of 296)
  - Density: 39,140/sq mi (15,110/km^{2})
- Time zone: UTC (GMT)
  - Summer (DST): UTC+1 (BST)
- Postcodes: E, EC, N, NW, WC
- Area code: 020
- ISO 3166 code: GB-ISL
- ONS code: 00AU
- GSS code: E09000019
- Police: Metropolitan Police
- Website: https://www.islington.gov.uk/

The London Borough of Islington (/ˈɪzlɪŋtən/ IZ-ling-tən) is a borough in North London, England. Forming part of Inner London, Islington has an estimated population of 215,667. It was formed in 1965, under the London Government Act 1963, by the amalgamation of the metropolitan boroughs of Islington and Finsbury.

The new entity remains the second smallest borough in London and the third-smallest district in England. The borough contains two Westminster parliamentary constituencies; Islington North, represented by former Labour Party leader Jeremy Corbyn, and Islington South & Finsbury represented by Labour MP Emily Thornberry. The local authority is Islington Council. The borough is home to football club Arsenal, one of the Premier League clubs in England, and its home Emirates Stadium.

== Etymology ==
Islington was originally named by the Saxons Giseldone (1005), then Gislandune (1062). The name means 'Gīsla's hill' from the Old English personal name Gīsla and dun 'hill', 'down'. The name then later mutated to Isledon, which remained in use well into the 17th century when the modern form arose. In medieval times, Islington was just one of many small manors in the area, along with Bernersbury, Neweton Berewe or Hey-bury, and Canonesbury (Barnsbury, Highbury and Canonbury – names first recorded in the 13th and 14th centuries). "Islington" came to be applied as the name for the parish covering these villages, which became the Metropolitan Borough of Islington in 1900. On the merger with Finsbury to form the modern borough, the Islington name was used for the whole borough.

== History ==
The area of the modern borough had historically been part of the county of Middlesex. From 1856 the area was governed by the Metropolitan Board of Works, which was established to provide services across the metropolis of London. In 1889 the Metropolitan Board of Works' area was made the County of London. From 1856 until 1900 the lower tier of local government within the metropolis comprised various parish vestries and district boards. In 1900 the lower tier was reorganised into metropolitan boroughs, two of which were called Islington and Finsbury, the latter covering the combined area of the parishes of Clerkenwell, St Luke and St Sepulchre, and the extra-parochial areas of Charterhouse and Glasshouse Yard. (Note: Glasshouse Yard and St Sepulchre had been part of the Holborn District Board of Works until 1900)

The modern borough was created in 1965 under the London Government Act 1963. It was a merger of the old Islington and Finsbury metropolitan boroughs.

== Geography ==
The southern part of the borough, south of the A501 Pentonville Road and City Road, forms part of the central London congestion charging zone and the Ultra Low Emission Zone. A significant part of the southern section of the borough borders the City of London, with the area to the west bordering the London Borough of Camden. The central London area includes Farringdon and Old Street stations both in Zone 1.

=== Districts ===
Areas in the borough include:

- Angel
- Archway
- Barnsbury
- Canonbury
- Clerkenwell
- Farringdon
- Finsbury
- Finsbury Park (split between three boroughs. Other boroughs are London Borough of Haringey and London Borough of Hackney).
- Highbury
- Highgate (split between three boroughs. Other boroughs are London Borough of Haringey and London Borough of Camden).
- Holloway
- Islington
- Kings Cross
- Lower Holloway
- Mildmay
- Nag's Head
- Newington Green
- Old Street
- Pentonville
- St Luke's
- Tufnell Park
- Upper Holloway

== Governance ==
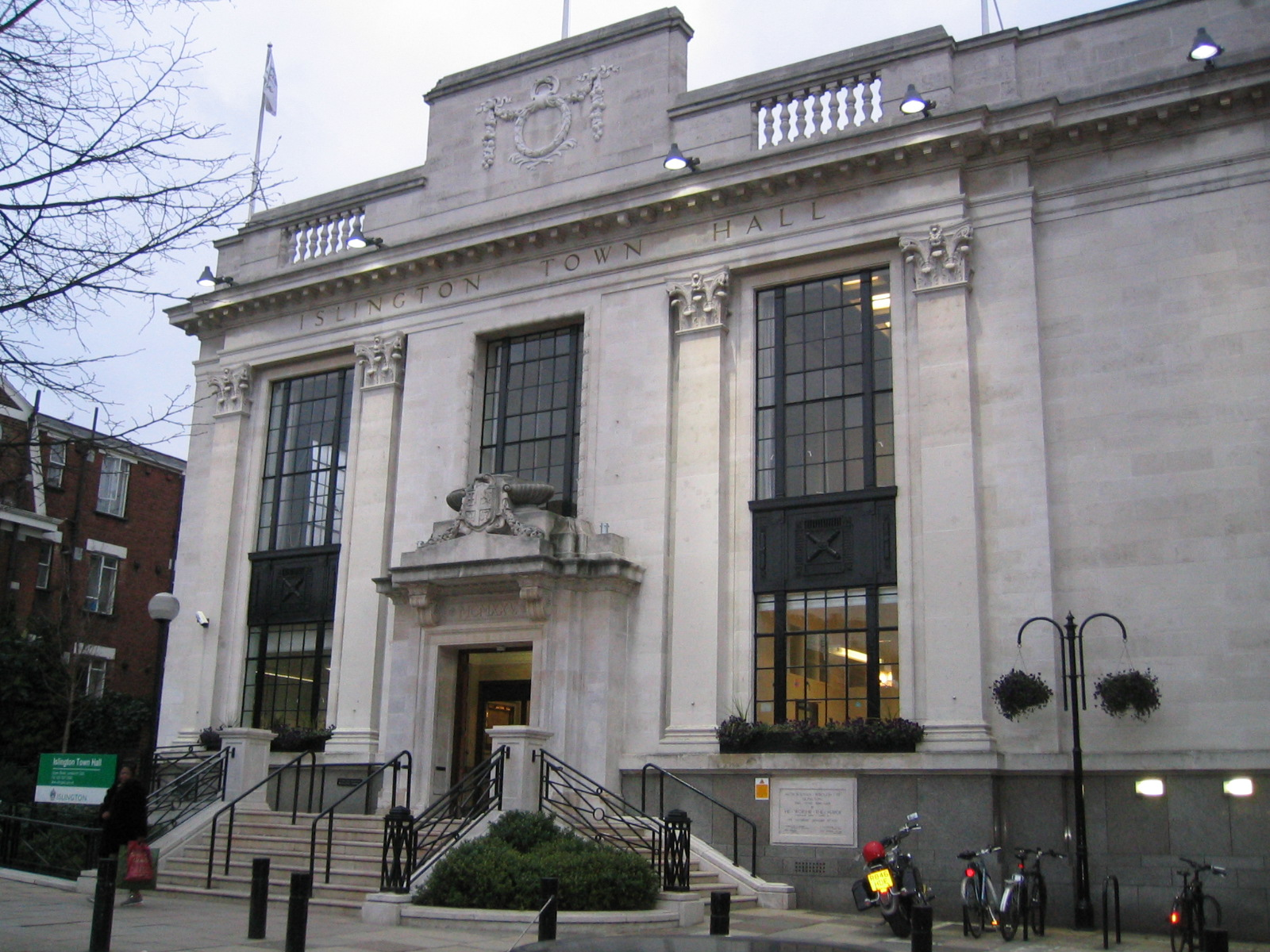
Islington Town Hall

The local authority is Islington Council, based at Islington Town Hall on Upper Street.

=== Greater London representation ===
Since 2000, for elections to the London Assembly, the borough forms part of the North East constituency.

=== UK Parliament ===
Islington is represented by two parliamentary constituencies. Islington North is represented by Jeremy Corbyn, elected in 2024 as an independent. He was formerly a member of the Labour Party, and was its leader and the Leader of Her Majesty's Opposition between 2015 and 2020. Islington South and Finsbury is represented by Emily Thornberry, former Shadow First Secretary of State and Shadow Secretary of State for Foreign and Commonwealth Affairs and current Shadow Secretary of State for International Trade of the Labour Party.

== Economy ==
In the Victorian Age, some parts of Islington such as Clerkenwell were known for their poverty, which George Gissing describes in his naturalist novel, The Nether World (1889). Since this time, Islington has been a subject of gentrification and with the median house price rising rapidly since the 2020 pandemic. With new headquarters for Facebook and Google close to the edge of the borough, along with Lawyer offices Slaughter & May on the edge of the borough, near the City of London, the borough has seen a steady house prices, with median incomes rising significantly.

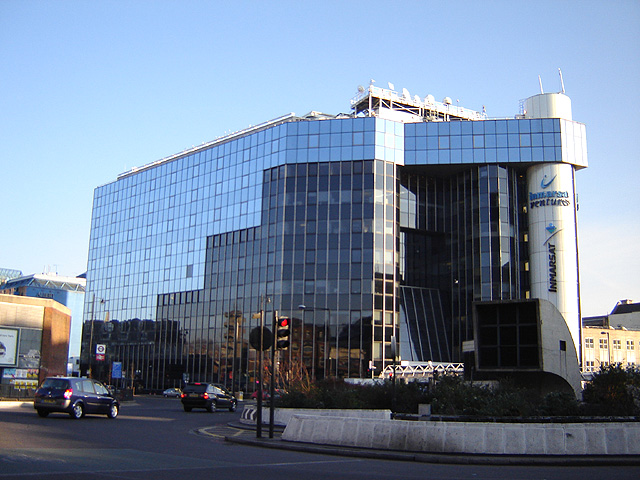
Inmarsat head office

Inmarsat has its head office in the borough.

== Major public and private bodies ==
=== Prisons ===
There is one prison in Islington, a men's prison, HM Prison Pentonville. Until it closed in 2016 there was also a women's prison HM Prison Holloway, which in the early 20th century was used to hold many suffragettes.

== Transport ==
The Borough boasts a large transport network for rail, bus, cycles and road users.

=== London Underground ===
There are ten London Underground stations in the borough across London fare zones 1, 2 and 3. These stations are principally served by the Northern, Piccadilly and Victoria lines, although the Circle, Hammersmith & City and Metropolitan lines also pass through the Borough:

- Angel
- Archway
- Arsenal
- Caledonian Road
- Farringdon
- Finsbury Park
- Highbury & Islington
- Holloway Road
- Old Street
- Tufnell Park

The Piccadilly line carries passengers to key London destinations, including the West End and Heathrow Airport. The Northern and Victoria lines also link the borough to the West End, whilst the Northern line (Bank branch) also passes through the City of London.

Just beyond the borough's boundaries are King's Cross St Pancras (in the London Borough of Camden) and Moorgate (in the City).

=== London Overground ===
There are also several London Overground stations in the borough, all but one of which are in London fare zone 2:

- Caledonian Road & Barnsbury
- Canonbury
- Crouch Hill
- Highbury & Islington
- Upper Holloway

=== National Rail ===
There are several other National Rail stations in Islington, which offer direct services to destinations across London, East Anglia and South East England:

- Drayton Park
- Essex Road
- Farringdon
- Finsbury Park
- Highbury & Islington
- Old Street

Farringdon and Finsbury Park are served by Thameslink services, with some trains travelling direct to Gatwick Airport, as well as destinations including Cambridge, Peterborough, Brighton and Sevenoaks. Other stations, including Finsbury Park, are served by Great Northern trains which normally operate between Moorgate and Welwyn Garden City or Stevenage via Hertford North. The Elizabeth line calls at Farringdon.

Moorgate lies just to the south of the borough, in the City of London, whilst King's Cross lies to the borough's immediate west, with destinations including Sheffield, Leeds, Newcastle, Edinburgh and Inverness.

=== Travel to work ===
In March 2011, the main forms of transport that residents used to travel to work were: underground, metro, light rail, tram, 19.4% of all residents aged 16–74; bus, minibus or coach, 10.3%; on foot, 10.3%; bicycle, 6.2%; driving a car or van, 6.0%; train, 3.7%; work mainly at or from home, 3.6%.

== Attractions and institutions ==
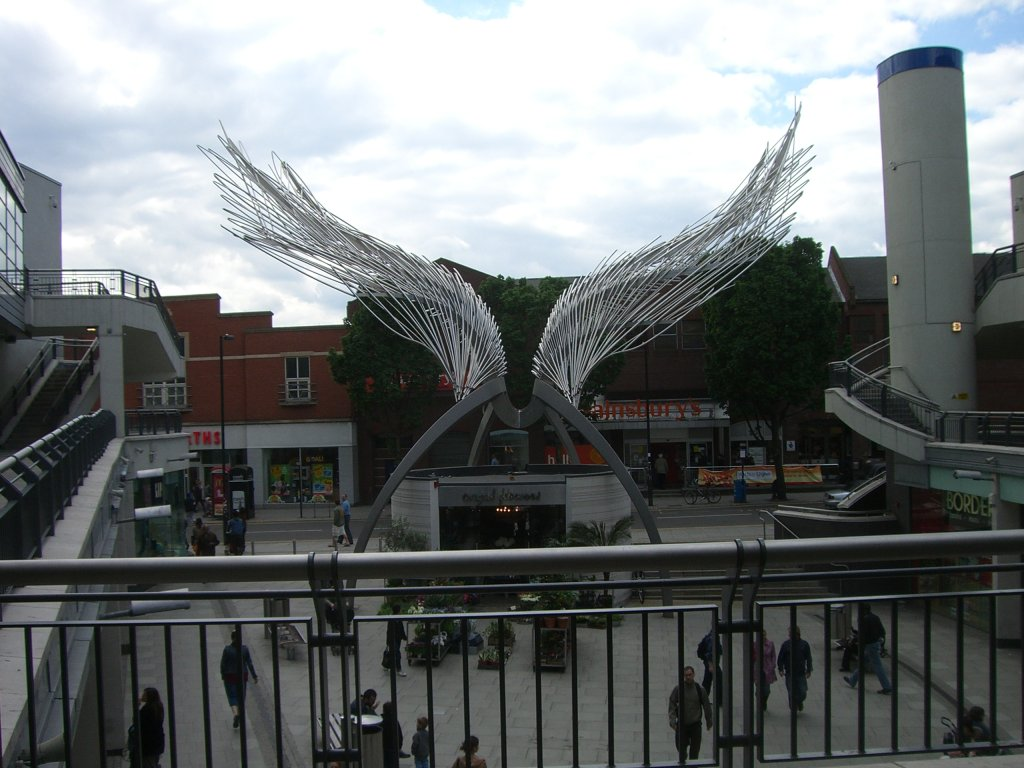
The 'Angel Central' shopping arcade

- Almeida Theatre
- Angel Central shopping centre (formerly the Islington N1 Centre), containing:
  - O2 Academy Islington
  - Vue cinema
- Artillery Ground
- Pleasance Islington theatre
- Courtyard Theatre
- Emirates Stadium (and the former Arsenal Stadium at Highbury)
- The Estorick Collection of Modern Italian Art in Canonbury Square
- Freightliners City Farm
- Hen and Chickens Theatre
- Islington Arts Factory, in Parkhurst Road
- Islington Public Libraries
- Islington Local History Centre, located at Finsbury Library
- Islington Museum, located at Finsbury Library
- John Salt, cocktail bar on Upper Street
- The King's Head Theatre
- Little Angel Theatre a puppet theatre and producer of the Suspense Puppetry Festival of London
- London Canal Museum, located in New Wharf Road, King's Cross
- London Charterhouse
- London Screen Academy, on Highbury Grove – specialist film/TV sixth form academy
- Odeon Cinema, located on Holloway Road
- Peter Benenson House, headquarters of Amnesty International
- Sadler's Wells Theatre
- St John's Gate, Clerkenwell (Islington's badge for London2012)
- The Screen On The Green, a single screen cinema on Upper Street
- Union Chapel
- Wesley's Chapel

== Demographics ==
Population pyramid of the Borough of Islington

Population
Year	Pop.	±%
1801	65,721	—
1811	83,679	+27.3%
1821	108,333	+29.5%
1831	137,271	+26.7%
1841	162,717	+18.5%
1851	214,090	+31.6%
1861	266,010	+24.3%
1871	317,930	+19.5%
1881	369,850	+16.3%
1891	397,799	+7.6%
1901	405,301	+1.9%
1911	412,944	+1.9%
1921	401,054	−2.9%
1931	389,513	−2.9%
1941	324,143	−16.8%
1951	269,743	−16.8%
1961	232,258	−13.9%
1971	200,022	−13.9%
1981	157,512	−21.3%
1991	173,384	+10.1%
2001	175,787	+1.4%
2011	206,125	+17.3%
2021	216,590	+5.1%
2024 estimate	223,024	+3.0%
Source: A Vision of Britain through time 2024 estimate

In 1801, the civil parishes that form the modern borough had a total population of 65,721. This rose steadily throughout the 19th century, as the district became built up; exceeding 200,000 in the middle of the century. When the railways arrived the rate of population growth increased—reaching nearly 400,000 by the turn of the century; with the Metropolitan Borough of Finsbury particularly suffering deprivation, poverty and severe overcrowding. The increase in population peaked before World War I, falling slowly in the aftermath until World War II began an exodus from London towards the new towns under the Abercrombie Plan for London (1944). The decline in population reversed in the 1980s, but it remains below its 1951 level.

According to the 2001 census Islington had a population of 175,797. It was 75% White, including 5% White Irish, 6% Black African, 5% Black Caribbean and 2% Bangladeshi. Thirty-two per cent of the borough's residents were owner–occupiers.

According to the 2011 census, Islington has the highest population density of local authorities in England and Wales—13,875 people per square kilometre.

Islington has the second highest proportion of Irish people in the country, behind London Borough of Brent.

A 2017 study by Trust for London and the New Policy Institute found that a third of Islington residents lived in poverty. This is above the London average of 27%. It also found that 14% of local employees were in jobs which pay below the London Living Wage – the fourth lowest figure of any London borough.

In 2023, 39% of the borough's residents identified as Christian, 12.8% Muslim, 1.7% Jewish and 42.7% had no religion. Christians and Muslims live throughout the borough, while the Jewish population is most concentrated in the north of the borough in the Hillrise and Junction wards (bordering Highgate and Crouch End).

=== Ethnicity ===
Ethnic makeup of Islington by single year ages in 2021

The following table shows the ethnic group of respondents in the 2001, 2011 and 2021 censuses in Islington.

Ethnic Group	Year											
Ethnic Group	1966 estimations		1981 estimations		1991 census		2001 census		2011 census		2021 census	
Ethnic Group	Number	%	Number	%	Number	%	Number	%	Number	%	Number	%
White: Total	–	93.8%	145,744	86.2%	140,757	81.1%	132,464	75.35%	140,515	68.17%	134,754	62.1%
White: British	–	–	–	–	–	–	99,784	56.76%	98,322	47.70%	86,092	39.7%
White: Irish	–	5.1%	–	–	–	–	10,057	5.72%	8,140	3.95%	7,062	3.3%
White: Gypsy or Irish Traveller	–	–	–	–	–	–	–	–	163	0.08%	108	0.0%
White: Roma	–	–	–	–	–	–	–	–	–	–	958	0.4%
White: Other	–	–	–	–	–	–	22,623	12.87%	33,890	16.44%	40,534	18.7%
Asian or Asian British: Total	–	1.5%	6,568	3.9%	10,644	6.1%	12,558	7.14%	19,034	9.23%	21,532	10.1%
Asian or Asian British: Indian	–	–	1,872		2,526		2,851	1.32%	3,534	2.06%	4,051	1.9%
Asian or Asian British: Pakistani	–	–	638		634		912	0.52%	951	0.46%	995	0.5%
Asian or Asian British: Bangladeshi	–	–	1,277		2,857		4,229	2.41%	4,662	2.26%	5,972	2.8%
Asian or Asian British: Chinese	–	–	1,579		2,193		3,074	1.75%	4,457	2.16%	5,125	2.4%
Asian or Asian British: Other Asian	–	–	1,202		2,434		1,492	0.85%	5,430	2.63%	5,389	2.5%
Black or Black British: Total	–	4.7%	14,397	8.5%	18,472	10.6%	20,856	11.86%	26,294	12.76%	28,743	13.3%
Black or Black British: African	–	1.4%	4,356		6,308		10,500	5.97%	12,622	6.12%	18,091	8.4%
Black or Black British: Caribbean	–	3.3%	7,501		8,824		8,550	4.86%	7,943	3.85%	7,368	3.4%
Black or Black British: Other Black	–	–	2,540		3,340		1,806	1.03%	5,729	2.78%	3,284	1.5%
Mixed or British Mixed: Total	–	–	–	–	–	–	7,234	4.11%	13,339	6.47%	16,231	7.4%
Mixed: White and Black Caribbean	–	–	–	–	–	–	2,329	1.32%	4,236	2.06%	4,171	1.9%
Mixed: White and Black African	–	–	–	–	–	–	1,241	0.71%	1,912	0.93%	2,257	1.0%
Mixed: White and Asian	–	–	–	–	–	–	1,543	0.88%	2,964	1.44%	3,750	1.7%
Mixed: Other Mixed	–	–	–	–	–	–	2,121	1.21%	4,227	2.05%	6,053	2.8%
Other: Total	–	–	2,413		3,623		2,685	1.53%	6,943	3.37%	15,330	7.1%
Other: Arab	–	–	–	–	–	–	–	–	1,893	0.92%	2,991	1.4%
Other: Any other ethnic group	–	–	–	–	–	–	–	–	5,050	2.45%	12,339	5.7%
Ethnic minority: Total	–	6.2%	23,378	13.8%	32,739	18.9%	43,333	24.65%	65,610	31.83%	81,836	37.9%
Total	–	100%	169,122	100%	173,496	100%	175,797	100.00%	206,125	100.00%	216,590	100%

=== Religion ===
The following shows the religious identity of residents residing in Islington according to the 2001, 2011 and the 2021 censuses.

Religion	2001		2011		2021	
Religion	Number	%	Number	%	Number	%
Holds religious beliefs	116,310	66.2	110,076	53.4	111,222	51.4
Christian	95,305	54.2	82,879	40.2	75,129	34.7
Muslim	14,259	8.1	19,521	9.5	25,840	11.9
Sikh	590	0.3	569	0.3	603	0.3
Hindu	1,751	1.0	2,108	1.0	2,195	1.0
Buddhist	1,840	1.0	2,117	1.0	1,813	0.8
Jewish	1,846	1.1	1,915	0.9	2,714	1.3
Other religion	719	0.4	967	0.5	2,930	1.4
No religion	41,691	23.7	61,911	30.0	88,466	40.8
Religion not stated	17,796	10.1	34,138	16.6	16,902	7.8
Total population	175,797	100.0	206,125	100.0	216,590	100.0

=== Immigration ===
This list includes top-15 sources of immigration to Borough of Islington for 2021 census:

#	Country	Number
1	Italy	5,079
2	France	4,346
3	Turkiye	4,220
4	United States	4,149
5	Ireland	4,116
6	Australia	3,225
7	Somalia	3,070
8	Spain	2,872
9	Bangladesh	2,381
10	China	2,079
11	Germany	1,958
12	India	1,839
13	Poland	1,806
14	Greece	1,782
15	Nigeria	1,477

== Education ==
=== Universities ===
The London Borough of Islington is home to two higher education institutions:

- City St George's, University of London at Northampton Square, formerly The City University, founded in 1894 as the Northampton Institute; and
- London Metropolitan University, North Campus on the Holloway Road, formed from the merger of the University of North London and London Guildhall University in 2002; the University of North London was founded on this site in 1896 as the Northern Polytechnic Institute

Moorfields Eye Hospital is a major centre for postgraduate training of ophthalmologists, orthoptists, optometrists, and nurses.

=== Further education ===
The borough also currently contains three colleges of further education:

- London Screen Academy; (a sixth form academy set up by Working Title Films to train young people in behind the camera skills)
- City and Islington College
- Westminster Kingsway College (while major improvement works are carried out at King's Cross)

There are two performing arts colleges. The Urdang Academy and the Musical Theatre Academy are both based in Islington.

=== Schools ===
The borough currently maintains 47 primary schools, 10 secondary schools, three special schools and five Pupil Referral Units. In 2000, Cambridge Education Associates, a private firm, took over the management of the Islington's state schools from the local education authority but the education service returned to the Council in 2011.

== Media ==
The Islington Gazette is a local newspaper.

== Freedom of the Borough ==
The Freedom of the Borough of Islington is awarded to people the Islington Council recognizes have "made an outstanding contribution to the community." It is the highest honor the Council can bestow.

== See also ==
- List of people from the London Borough of Islington
- Arsenal F.C.
- Emirates Stadium
- Finsbury Town Hall
- St James' Church, Islington
