= Paves =

Italian troubadour and composer

Paves or Pavese was a Lombard troubadour of the first half of the 13th century, only a single cobla of whose work survives. The work is preserved in one chansonnier of late 13th-century Italian provenance, now known as "troubadour manuscript H" or Latin 3207, kept in the Biblioteca Vaticana, Rome. In the same manuscript are preserved two other works with the same rhyming scheme, one by Guilhem Figueira and another by Aimeric de Peguilhan.

Paves' cobla is a humorous treatment of what was evidently a fight in a Florentine tavern. There is reference to a blow struck with a piece of dried bread instead of any weapon of war. The combatants were two Italians, Capitanis (or Cattano/Cattaneo) and Guillem (Guglielmo il Noioso). It has been surmised that "Capitanis" may be an allusion to Sordello, who is referred to as gentils catanis in two Occitan vidas. Paves' cobla is customarily dated between 1215, when Figueira entered Italy, and 1245, the death of Aimeric de Peguilhan.

Anc de Roland ni del pro n'Auliver
No fo auzitz us colps tant engoissos
Cum scels qe fez Capitanis l'autrer,
A Florença, a'n Guillem l'enoios:
E no fo ges d'espada ni de lanza:
Anz fo d'un pan dur e sec sus en l'oill,
Q'estop'e sal et ou, aital mesclanza
L'i mes hom destenprad'ab orgoill!

Yet neither of Roland nor the stalwart Oliver
was heard given so serious a blow
like that which Capitanis gave yesterday,
at Florence, to Sir William the boring.
And not a blow of sword or lance.
Rather it was of hard dry bread on the eye,
that there was put an oakum of salt and egg, such a mixture
that dissolved with pride!
