= King's Square =

King's Square or King Square may refer to the following places:

== United Kingdom ==
- King Square, Barry, Wales
- King Square, Bridgwater, Somerset, England
- Kings Square, Gloucester, England
- King Square, London
  - King Square Gardens
- King's Square (York)

== Elsewhere ==
- Kings Square, Fremantle, Australia
- Kings Square, Perth, Australia
- King's Square, St. George's, Bermuda
- King Square Shopping Mall, Markham, Ontario, Canada
- King’s Square, Saint John, New Brunswick, Canada
- King's Square, Benin City Ring Road, Nigeria
- Königsplatz, Berlin, Germany, now Platz der Republik
- Königsplatz, Munich, Germany
  - Königsplatz (Munich U-Bahn)
- Plaça del Rei, Barcelona, Spain
- Polish Soldier Square, formerly known as King Square from 1809 go 1945

== See also ==
- Royal Plaza (disambiguation)
- Queen Square (disambiguation)
- Königsplatz (disambiguation)
