= John Dolan =

John Dolan may refer to:

- John P. Dolan (born 1962), American Catholic prelate
- John Dolan (writer) (born 1955), American poet and novelist, responsible for the War Nerd podcasts
- John Dolan (baseball) (1867–1948), American Major League Baseball pitcher
- John Dolan (poker player), one of the "November Nine" in the 2010 World Series of Poker
- Johnny Dolan (1849/50–1876), American murderer
- John Dolan (artist) (born 1971), British artist
- John Dolan (politician) (born 1956), Irish senator
- John F. Dolan (1922–2013), member of the Massachusetts State Legislature

== See also ==
- Jerry Dolan (John Dolan, 1901–1986), Australian footballer for East Fremantle and politician
- Jack Dolan (1906–2001), Australian footballer for Essendon
- John Dolan School, Eastview, Saskatoon, Canada
- Jonathan Dolan (born 1967), American politician
