= George IV =

King of the United Kingdom from 1820 to 1830

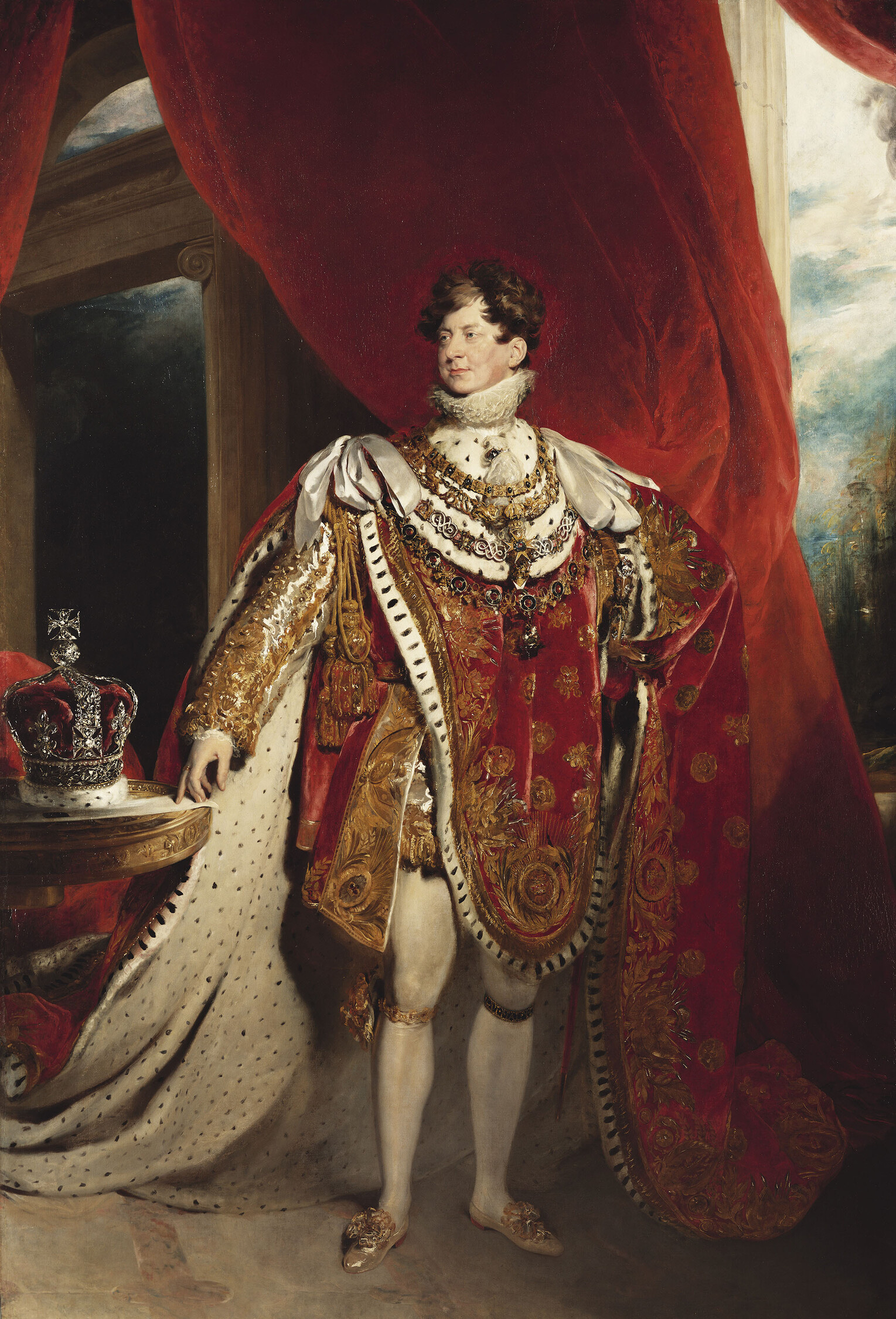
- Coronation portrait of George IV, c. 1821

King of the United Kingdom and Hanover
- Reign: 29 January 1820 – 26 June 1830
- Coronation: 19 July 1821
- Predecessor: George III
- Successor: William IV

Prince Regent of the United Kingdom
- Regency: 5 February 1811 – 29 January 1820
- Monarch: George III
- Born: 12 August 1762; St James's Palace, London, England
- Died: 26 June 1830 (aged 67); Windsor Castle, Berkshire, England
- Burial: 15 July 1830; Royal Vault, St George's Chapel, Windsor Castle
- Spouse: Caroline of Brunswick (m. 1795; died 1821)
- Issue: Princess Charlotte of Wales
Names
- George Augustus Frederick
- House: Hanover
- Father: George III
- Mother: Charlotte of Mecklenburg-Strelitz
- Religion: Protestant

George IV (George Augustus Frederick; 12 August 1762 – 26 June 1830) was King of the United Kingdom of Great Britain and Ireland and King of Hanover from 29 January 1820 until his death in 1830. At the time of his accession to the throne, he was acting as prince regent for his father, King George III, having done so since 5 February 1811 during his father's final mental illness.

George IV was the eldest child of King George III and Queen Charlotte. Known affectionately as "Prinny" by friends, he led an extravagant lifestyle that contributed to the fashions of the Regency era. He was a patron of new forms of leisure, style and taste. He commissioned John Nash to build the Royal Pavilion in Brighton and remodel Buckingham Palace, and commissioned Jeffry Wyatville to rebuild Windsor Castle. George's charm and culture earned him the title "the first gentleman of England", but his dissolute way of life and poor relationships with his parents and his wife, Caroline of Brunswick, earned him the contempt of the people and dimmed the prestige of the monarchy. He excluded Caroline from his coronation and asked the government to introduce the unpopular Pains and Penalties Bill in an unsuccessful attempt to divorce her.

George's rule was tarnished by scandal and financial extravagance. His ministers found his behaviour selfish, unreliable and irresponsible, and he was strongly influenced by favourites. During most of George's regency and reign, Lord Liverpool controlled the government as prime minister of the United Kingdom. Liverpool's government presided over Britain's ultimate victory over Napoleon and negotiated a peace settlement with the French. After Liverpool's retirement, George was forced to accept Catholic emancipation despite opposing it. His only legitimate child, Princess Charlotte, predeceased him in 1817, as did his childless younger brother Prince Frederick in 1827, so he was succeeded by another younger brother, William IV.

== Early life ==
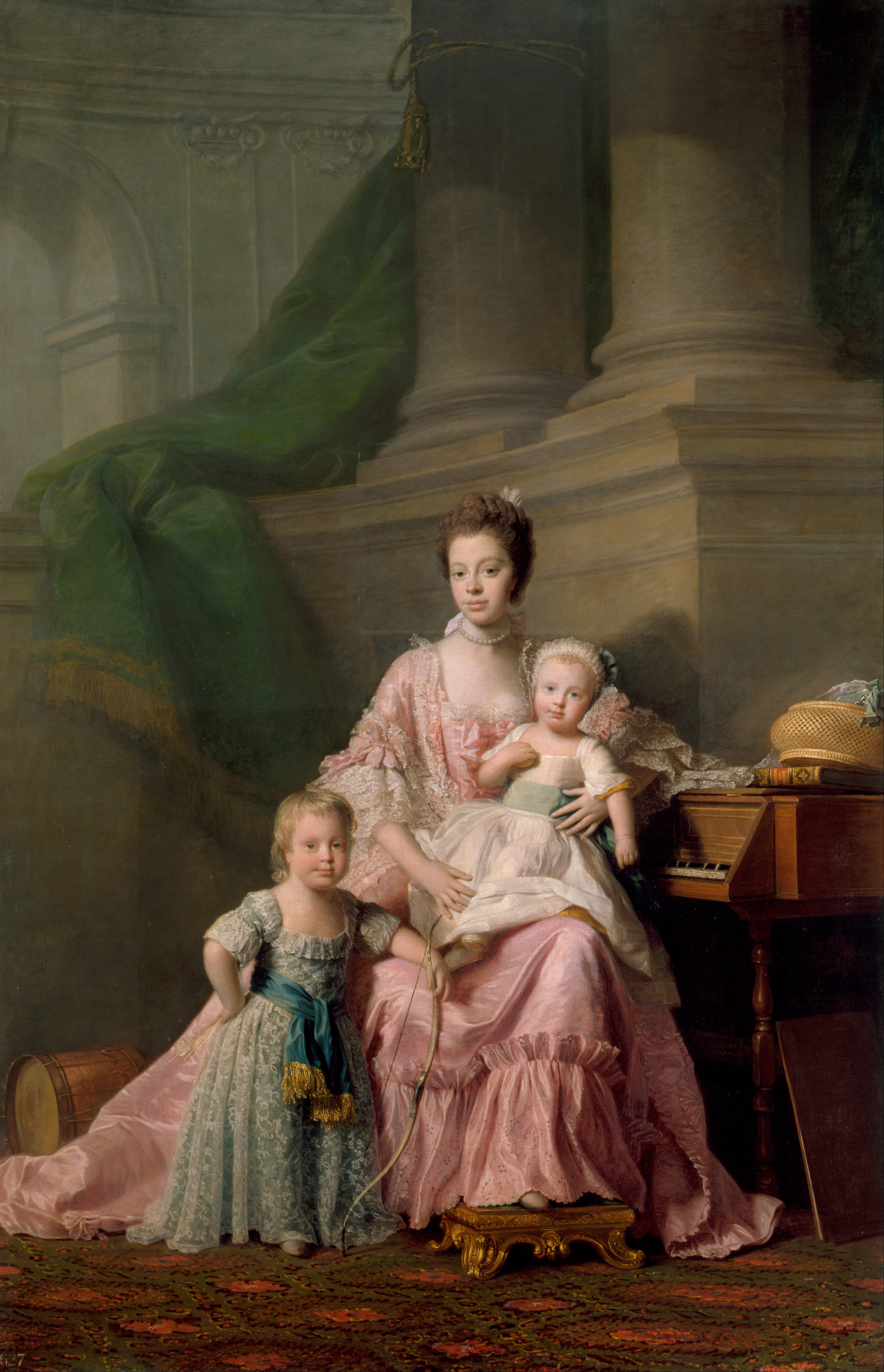
George (left; unbreeched at two years) with his mother, Queen Charlotte, and younger brother, Frederick. Portrait by Allan Ramsay, 1764

George was born on 12 August 1762 at St James's Palace, London, the first child of King George III and Queen Charlotte. As the eldest son of a British sovereign, he automatically became Duke of Cornwall and Duke of Rothesay at birth; he was created Prince of Wales and Earl of Chester a few days later. George was baptised on 18 September by Thomas Secker, Archbishop of Canterbury. His godparents were his maternal uncle Adolphus Frederick IV, Duke of Mecklenburg-Strelitz (for whom the Lord Chamberlain, William Cavendish, 4th Duke of Devonshire, stood proxy); his paternal grand-uncle Prince William, Duke of Cumberland; and his grandmother Augusta, Dowager Princess of Wales.

George was a talented student and quickly learned to speak French, German and Italian, in addition to his native English.

At the age of 18, Prince George was given a separate establishment, and in dramatic contrast to his prosaic, scandal-free father, threw himself with zest into a life of dissipation and wild extravagance involving heavy drinking and numerous mistresses and escapades. He was a witty conversationalist, drunk or sober, and showed good, but grossly expensive, taste in decorating his residences. George turned 21 in 1783, and obtained a grant of £60,000 (equivalent to £7,821,000 today) from Parliament and an annual income of £50,000 (equivalent to £6,518,000 today) from his father. It was far too little for his wants – his stables alone cost £31,000 a year. He then established his residence in Carlton House, where he lived a profligate life. Animosity developed between the Prince and his father, who desired more frugal behaviour on the part of the heir apparent. The King, a political conservative, was also alienated by the Prince's adherence to Charles James Fox and other radically inclined politicians.

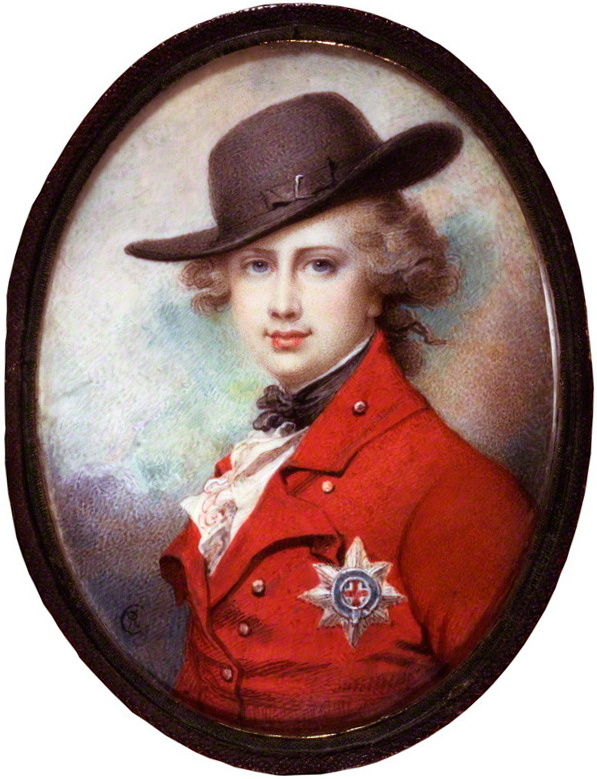
Portrait miniature by Richard Cosway, c. 1780–82

Soon after he reached the age of 21, the prince became infatuated with Maria Fitzherbert. She was a commoner (though granddaughter of a baronet), six years his elder, twice widowed, and a Roman Catholic. Nevertheless, the Prince was determined to marry her. This was in spite of the Act of Settlement 1701, which barred the spouse of a Catholic from succeeding to the throne, and the Royal Marriages Act 1772, which prohibited his marriage without the King's consent.

The couple went through a marriage ceremony on 15 December 1785 at Fitzherbert's house in Park Street, Mayfair. Legally the union was void, as the King's consent was not granted (and never even requested). However, Fitzherbert believed that she was the Prince's canonical and true wife, holding the law of the Church to be superior to the law of the State. For political reasons, the union was to remain secret and Fitzherbert promised not to reveal it. But, in spring 1786, covert allusions to the marriage appeared in the press, and several satirical prints depicted the clandestine marriage.

Prince George was plunged into debt by his exorbitant lifestyle. His father refused to assist him, forcing him to quit Carlton House and live at Fitzherbert's residence. In 1787, the Prince's political allies proposed to relieve his debts with a parliamentary grant. George's relationship with Fitzherbert was suspected, and revelation of the illegal marriage would have scandalised the nation and doomed any parliamentary proposal to aid him. Acting on Prince George's authority, the Whig leader Charles James Fox declared that the story was a calumny. Fitzherbert was not pleased with the public denial of the marriage in such vehement terms and contemplated severing her ties to George. He appeased her by asking another Whig, Richard Brinsley Sheridan, to restate Fox's forceful declaration in more careful words. Parliament, meanwhile, granted the Prince £161,000 (equivalent to £21,862,000 today) to pay his debts and £60,000 (equivalent to £8,147,000 today) for improvements to Carlton House.

Prince George was an avid horseracing fan and racehorse owner. In 1790, his jockey Samuel Chifney and racehorse Escape were embroiled in a scandal over a perceived reversal of form. The Newmarket stewards did not accept Chifney's explanation and warned the Prince of Wales that if he continued to use Chifney, no gentleman would race against him. In consequence, not wanting to make an example of his jockey, the Prince of Wales sold his stable and ended his connection with the turf. He told Chifney he would be unlikely to return to ownership, "but if I ever do, Sam Chifney, you shall train and manage them. You shall have your 200 guineas a year all the same. I cannot give it to you for your life, I can only give it to you for my own. You have been a good and honest servant to me." Despite pleas from the Jockey Club, the prince never returned to Newmarket.

== Regency crisis of 1788 ==
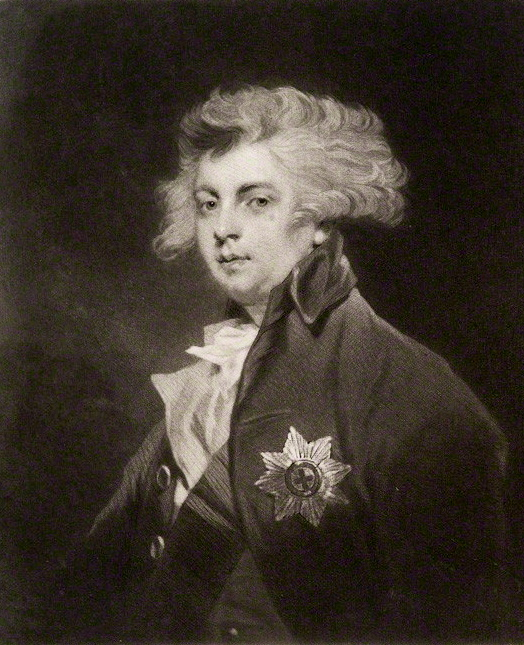
Mezzotint engraving by Samuel William Reynolds, based on a painting by Sir Joshua Reynolds, 1785

In the summer of 1788, the King's mental health deteriorated. He nonetheless discharged some of his duties and declared Parliament prorogued from 25 September to 20 November. During the prorogation, he became deranged, posing a threat to his own life, and when Parliament reconvened in November, the King could not deliver the customary speech from the throne during the State Opening of Parliament. Parliament found itself in an untenable position: according to long-established law it could not proceed to any business until the delivery of the King's Speech at a State Opening.

Although arguably barred from doing so, Parliament began debating a regency. In the House of Commons, Charles James Fox declared his opinion that Prince George was automatically entitled to exercise sovereignty during the King's incapacity. A contrasting opinion was held by the prime minister, William Pitt the Younger, who argued that, in the absence of a statute to the contrary, the right to choose a regent belonged to Parliament alone. He even stated that, without parliamentary authority "the Prince of Wales had no more right ... to assume the government, than any other individual subject of the country". Though disagreeing on the principle underlying a regency, Pitt agreed with Fox that the Prince of Wales would be the most convenient choice for a regent.

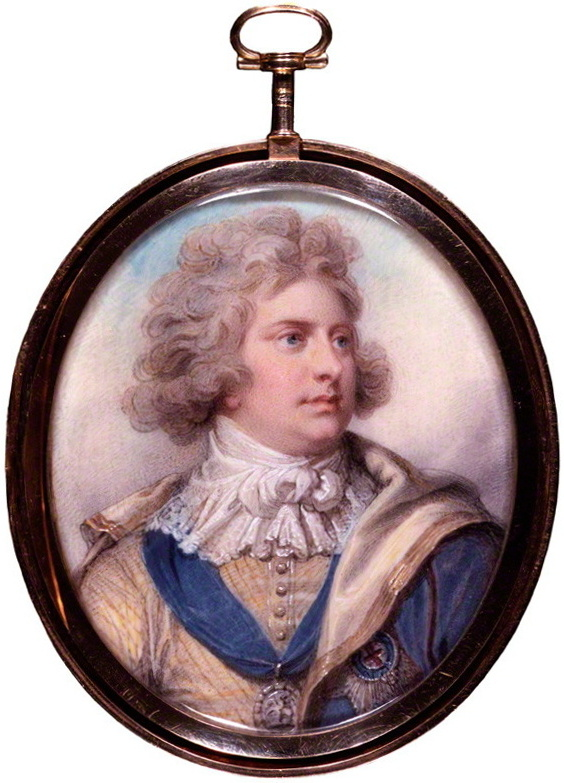
Miniature by Richard Cosway, 1792

The Prince of Wales, though offended by Pitt's boldness, did not lend his full support to Fox's approach. Prince George's brother Prince Frederick, Duke of York and Albany, declared that George would not attempt to exercise any power without previously obtaining the consent of Parliament. Following the passage of preliminary resolutions Pitt outlined a formal plan for the regency, suggesting that Prince George's powers be greatly limited. Among other things, George would not be able either to sell the King's property or to grant a peerage to anyone other than a child of the King. Prince George denounced Pitt's scheme by declaring it a "project for producing weakness, disorder, and insecurity in every branch of the administration of affairs". In the interests of the nation, both factions agreed to compromise.

A significant technical impediment to any Regency Bill involved the lack of a speech from the throne, which was necessary before Parliament could proceed to any debates or votes. The speech was normally delivered by the King but could also be delivered by royal representatives known as Lords Commissioners. However, no document could empower the Lords Commissioners to act unless the Great Seal of the Realm was affixed to it. The seal could not be legally affixed without the prior authorisation of the sovereign. Pitt and his fellow ministers ignored the last requirement and instructed the Lord Chancellor to affix the Great Seal without the King's consent, as the act of affixing the Great Seal in itself gave legal force to the bill. The legal fiction was denounced by Edmund Burke as "forgery, fraud"; a "glaring falsehood" and a "palpable absurdity". Prince Frederick described the plan as "unconstitutional and illegal". Nevertheless, others in Parliament felt that such a scheme was necessary to preserve an effective government. Consequently, on 3 February 1789, more than two months after it had convened, Parliament was formally opened by an "illegal" group of Lords Commissioners. The Regency Bill was introduced, but before it could be passed the King recovered. The King declared retroactively that the instrument authorising the Lords Commissioners to act was valid.

== Marriage and mistresses ==
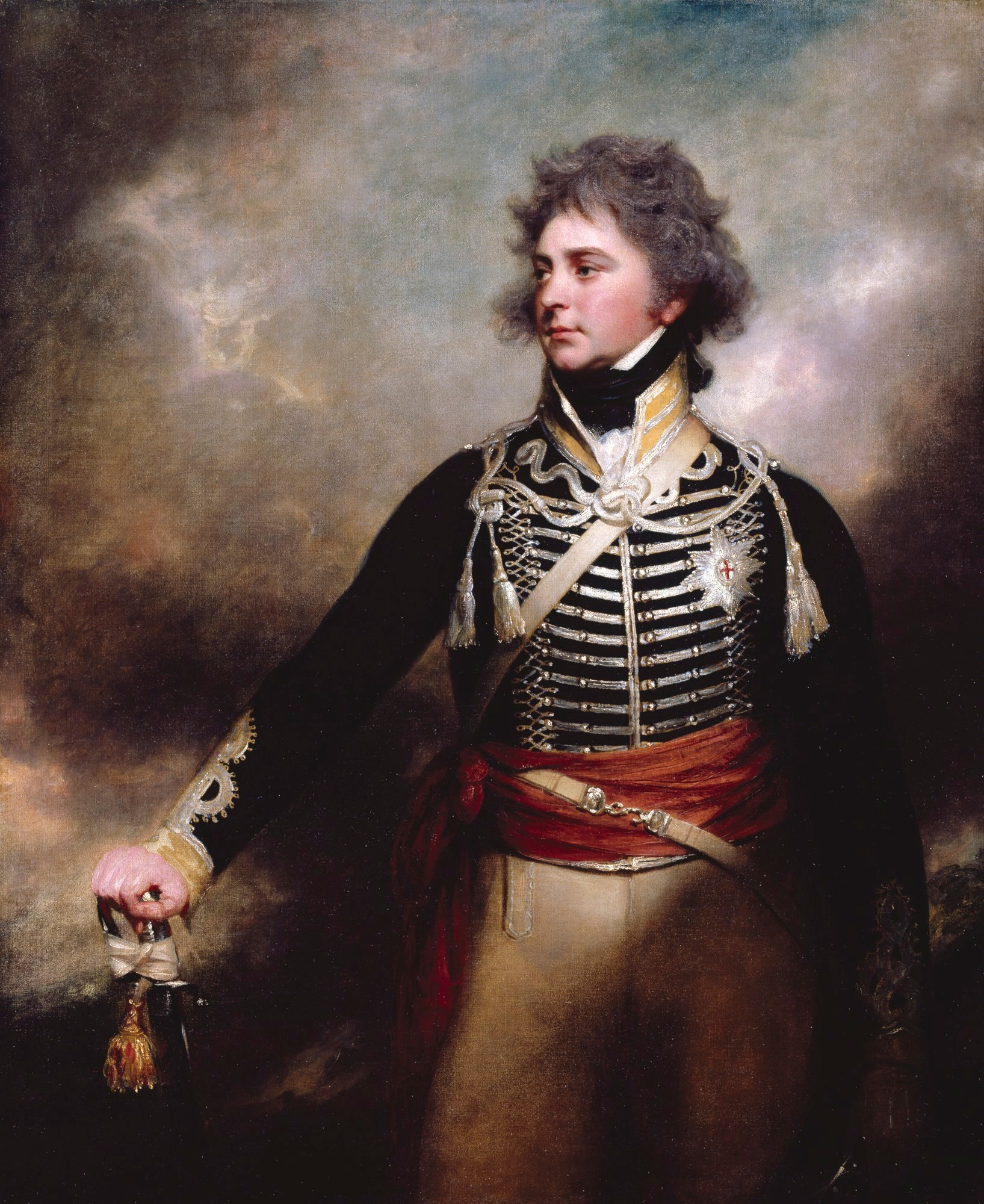
Portrait of George, Prince of Wales by Sir William Beechey, 1798

Prince George's debts continued to climb, and his father refused to aid him unless he married his cousin Princess Caroline of Brunswick. In 1795, the Prince acquiesced, and they were married on 8 April 1795 at the Chapel Royal, St James's Palace. The marriage, however, was disastrous; each party was unsuited to the other. The two were formally separated after the birth of their only child, Princess Charlotte, in 1796, and remained separated thereafter. George remained attached to Maria Fitzherbert for the rest of his life, despite several periods of estrangement.

George's mistresses included Mary Robinson, an actress whom he paid to leave the stage; Grace Elliott, the divorced wife of a physician; and Frances Villiers, Countess of Jersey, who dominated his life for some years. In later life, his mistresses were Isabella Ingram-Seymour-Conway, Marchioness of Hertford and Elizabeth Conyngham, Marchioness Conyngham.

George was rumoured to have fathered several illegitimate children. James Ord (born 1786) – who moved to the United States and became a Jesuit priest – was reportedly his son by Fitzherbert. Late in life, George told a friend that he had a son who was a naval officer in the West Indies, whose identity has been tentatively established as Captain Henry A. F. Hervey (1786–1824), reportedly George's child by the songwriter Lady Anne Lindsay (later Barnard), a daughter of James Lindsay, 5th Earl of Balcarres. Other reported children include Major George Seymour Crole, the son of theatre manager's daughter Eliza Crole; William Hampshire, the son of publican's daughter Sarah Brown; and Charles "Beau" Candy, the son of a Frenchwoman with that surname. Anthony Camp, Director of Research at the Society of Genealogists, has dismissed the claims that George IV was the father of Ord, Hervey, Hampshire and Candy as fictitious.

Prince of Wales Act 1795
- Act of Parliament
- Parliament of Great Britain
- Long title: An act for enabling his Majesty to settle an annuity on his royal highness the prince of Wales, during the joint lives of his Majesty and of his said royal highness; for making provision out of his revenues for the payment of any debts that may be due from his royal highness; for preventing the accumulation of debts in future; and for regulating the mode of expenditure of the said revenues.
- Citation: 35 Geo. 3. c. 129
- Territorial extent: Great Britain

Dates
- Royal assent: 27 June 1795
- Commencement: 27 June 1795 (Note: The Acts of Parliament (Commencement) Act 1793.)
- Repealed: 21 August 1871
Other legislation
| Amended by | Annuity to Prince of Wales, etc. Act 1803 |
| Repealed by | Statute Law Revision Act 1871 |

Status: Repealed

Text of statute as originally enacted

Annuity to Prince of Wales, etc. Act 1803
- Act of Parliament
- Parliament of the United Kingdom
- Long title: An act for enabling his Majesty to settle an Annuity on his Royal Highness the Prince of Wales, to continue until the fifth Day of July One thousand eight hundred and six; and for repealing so much of an Act made in the thirty-fifth Year of the Reign of his Majesty, as directs the annual Payment of thirteen thousand rounds out of the Revenues of the Dutchy of Cornwall to the Commissioners appointed by the said Act.
- Citation: 43 Geo. 3. c. 26
- Territorial extent: United Kingdom

Dates
- Royal assent: 24 March 1803
- Commencement: 24 March 1803
- Repealed: 6 August 1872
Other legislation
| Amends | Prince of Wales Act 1795 |
| Repealed by | Statute Law Revision Act 1872 |

Status: Repealed

Text of statute as originally enacted

The problem of George's debts, which amounted to the extraordinary sum of £630,000 in 1795 (equivalent to £65,526,000 today), was solved (at least temporarily) by Parliament. Being unwilling to make an outright grant to relieve these debts, it passed the Prince of Wales Act 1795 (35 Geo. 3. c. 129) which provided him an additional sum of £65,000 (equivalent to £6,761,000 today) per annum. In 1803, a further £60,000 (equivalent to £5,333,000 today) was added by the Annuity to Prince of Wales, etc. Act 1803 (43 Geo. 3. c. 26), and George's debts as at 1795 were finally cleared in 1806, although the debts he had incurred since 1795 remained.

In 1804, a dispute arose over the custody of Princess Charlotte, which led to her being placed in the care of the King. It also led to a parliamentary commission of enquiry into Princess Caroline's conduct after her husband accused her of having an illegitimate son. The investigation cleared Caroline of the charge but still revealed her behaviour to have been extraordinarily indiscreet.

== Regency ==
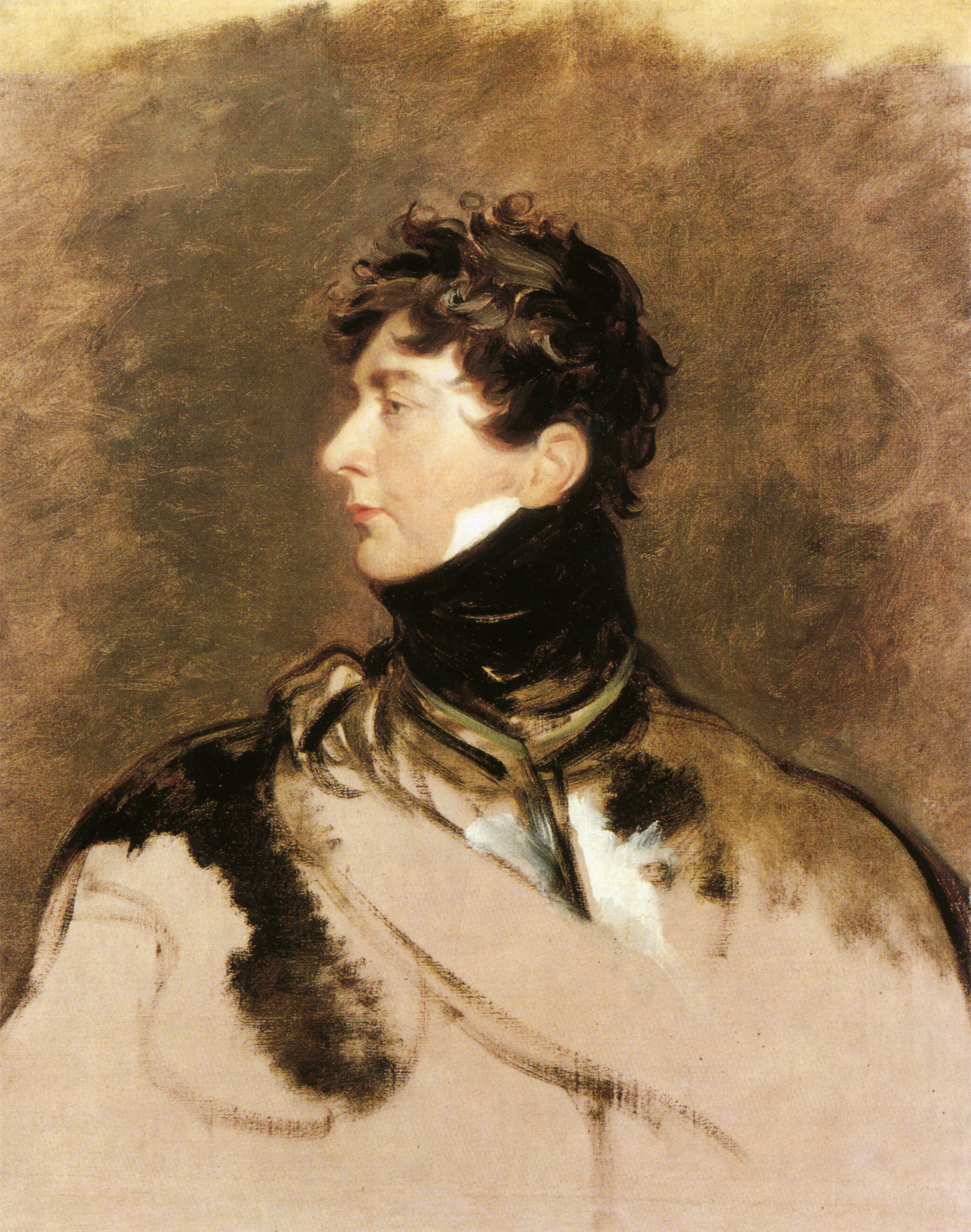
Profile by Sir Thomas Lawrence, c. 1814

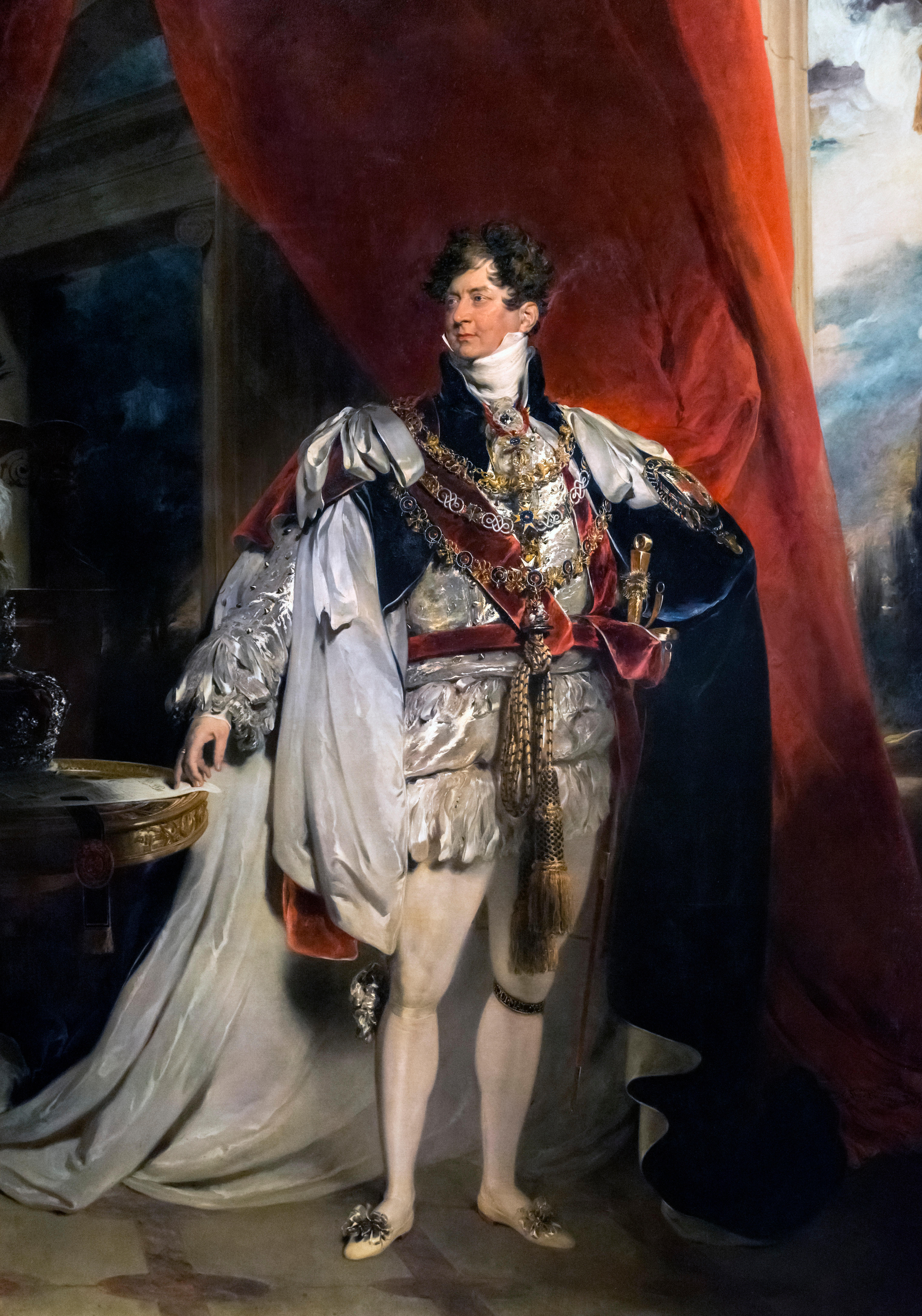
Portrait in Garter robes by Lawrence, 1816

In late 1810, the King's mental health once again broke down, following the death of his youngest daughter, Princess Amelia. Parliament agreed to follow the precedent of 1788; without the King's consent, the Lord Chancellor affixed the Great Seal of the Realm to letters patent naming Lords Commissioners. The letters patent lacked the Royal Sign Manual, but were sealed by request of resolutions passed by both Houses of Parliament. The Lords Commissioners appointed by the letters patent, in the name of the King, then signified the granting of Royal Assent to a bill that became the Regency Act 1811. Parliament restricted some of the powers of the Prince Regent (as the Prince of Wales became known). The constraints expired one year after the passage of the Act. The Prince of Wales became Prince Regent on 5 February 1811.

The Regent let his ministers take full charge of government affairs, playing a far smaller role than his father. The principle that the prime minister was the person supported by a majority in the House of Commons, whether the King personally favoured him or not, became established. His governments, with little help from the Regent, presided over British policy. One of the most important political conflicts facing the country concerned Catholic emancipation, the movement to relieve Roman Catholics of various political disabilities. The Tories, led by Prime Minister Spencer Perceval, were opposed to Catholic emancipation, while the Whigs supported it. At the beginning of the Regency, Prince George was expected to support the Whig leader, Lord Grenville. He did not, however, immediately put Grenville and the Whigs into office. Influenced by his mother, he claimed that a sudden dismissal of the Tory government would exact too great a toll on the health of the King (a steadfast supporter of the Tories), thereby eliminating any chance of a recovery.

In 1812, when it appeared highly unlikely that the King would recover, the Prince Regent again failed to appoint a new Whig administration. Instead, he asked the Whigs to join the existing ministry under Perceval. The Whigs, however, refused to co-operate because of disagreements over Catholic emancipation. Grudgingly, Prince George allowed Perceval to continue as prime minister.

On 11 May 1812, Perceval was assassinated by John Bellingham. The Prince Regent was prepared to reappoint all the members of the Perceval ministry under a new leader. The House of Commons formally declared its desire for a "strong and efficient administration", so George then offered leadership of the government to Lord Wellesley and afterwards to Lord Moira. He doomed the attempts of both to failure, however, by forcing each to construct an all-party ministry at a time when neither party wished to share power with the other. Possibly using the failure of the two peers as a pretext, George immediately reappointed the Perceval administration, with Lord Liverpool as prime minister.

The Tories, unlike Whigs such as Lord Grey, sought to continue the vigorous prosecution of the war in Continental Europe against the powerful and aggressive Emperor of the French, Napoleon I. An anti-French alliance, which included Russia, Prussia, Austria, Britain and several smaller countries, defeated Napoleon in 1814. In the subsequent Congress of Vienna, it was decided that the Electorate of Hanover, a state that had shared a monarch with Britain since 1714, would be raised to the Kingdom of Hanover. Napoleon returned from exile in 1815, but was defeated at the Battle of Waterloo by the Duke of Wellington, brother of Lord Wellesley.

During this period George took an active interest in matters of style and taste, and his associates such as the dandy Beau Brummell and the architect John Nash created the Regency style, exemplified by the Regency terraces of Regent's Park and Regent Street. George took up the new idea of the seaside spa and had the Brighton Pavilion developed as a fantastical seaside palace, adapted by Nash in the "Indian Gothic" style inspired loosely by the Taj Mahal, with extravagant "Indian" and "Chinese" interiors.

== Reign ==
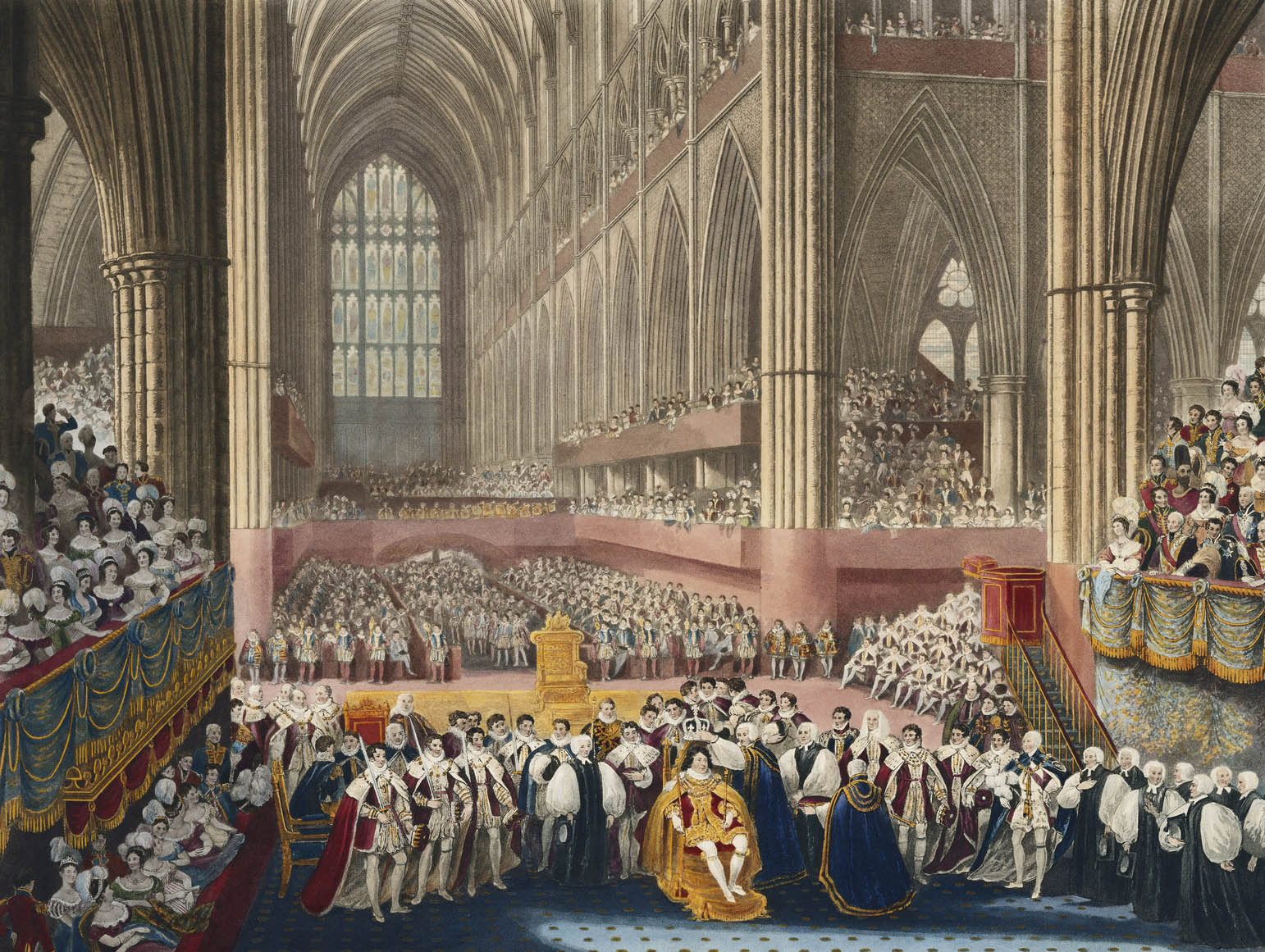
George IV's coronation, 19 July 1821

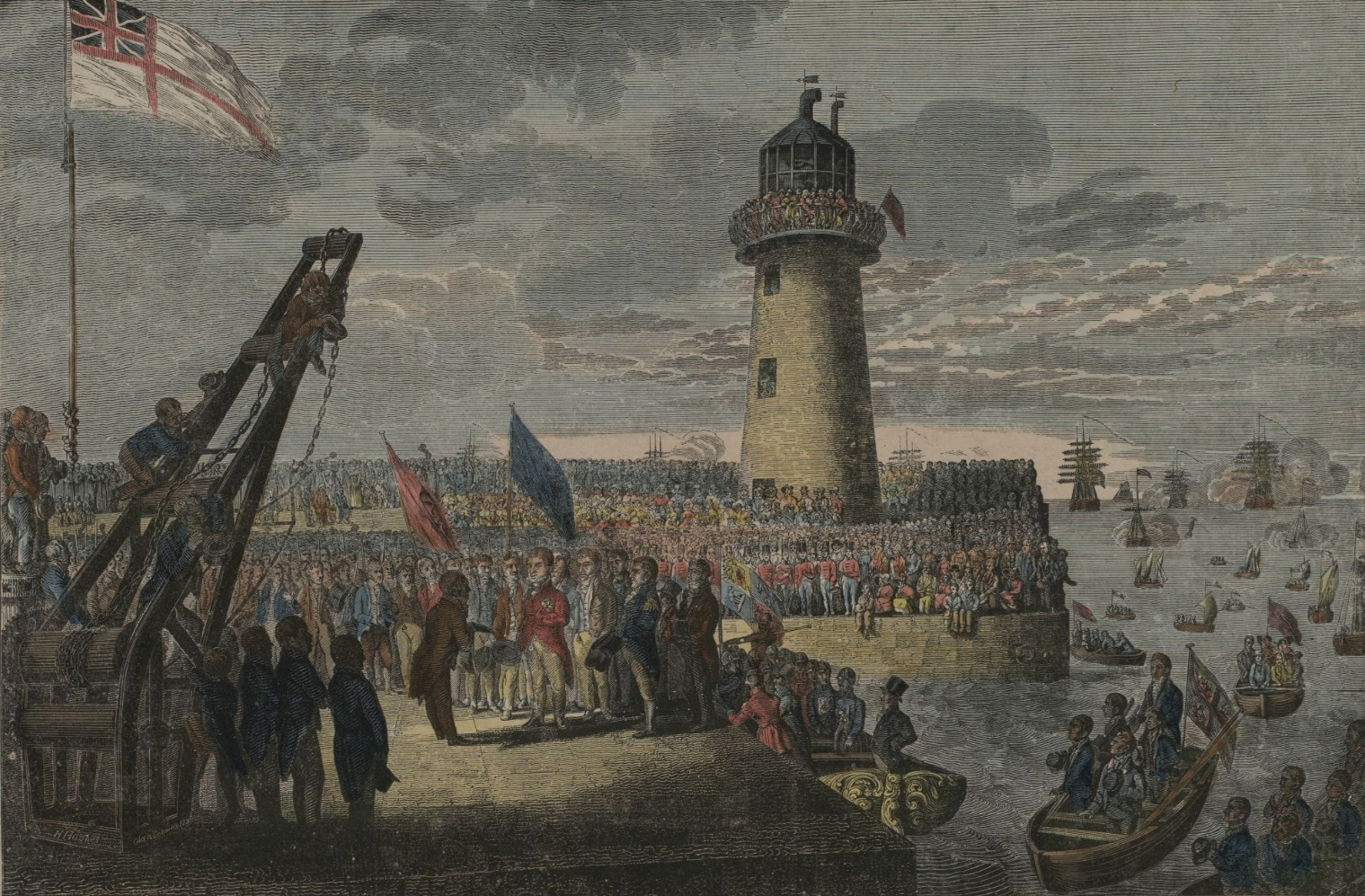
George IV at Holyhead en route to Ireland on 7 August 1821, the day of his wife's death

When George III died in 1820, the Prince Regent, then aged 57, ascended the throne as George IV, with no real change in his powers. By the time of his accession, he was obese and possibly addicted to laudanum.

George IV's relationship with his wife Caroline had deteriorated by the time of his accession. They had lived separately since 1796, and both were having affairs. In 1814, Caroline left the United Kingdom for continental Europe, but she chose to return for her husband's coronation and to publicly assert her rights as queen consort. However, he refused to recognise Caroline as queen, and commanded British ambassadors to ensure that monarchs in foreign courts did the same. By royal command, Caroline's name was omitted from the Book of Common Prayer, the liturgy of the Church of England.

The King sought a divorce, but his advisors suggested that any divorce proceedings might involve the publication of details relating to George's own adulterous relationships. Therefore, he requested and ensured the introduction of the Pains and Penalties Bill, under which Parliament could have imposed legal penalties without a trial in a court of law. The bill would have annulled the marriage and stripped Caroline of the title of queen. The bill proved extremely unpopular with the public, and was withdrawn from Parliament. George decided, nonetheless, to exclude his wife from his coronation at Westminster Abbey, on 19 July 1821. Caroline fell ill that day and died on 7 August; during her final illness she often stated that she thought she had been poisoned. George's coronation was a magnificent and expensive affair, costing about £243,000 (approximately £27,000,000 in 2025; for comparison, his father's coronation had only cost about £10,000). Despite the enormous cost, it was a popular event.

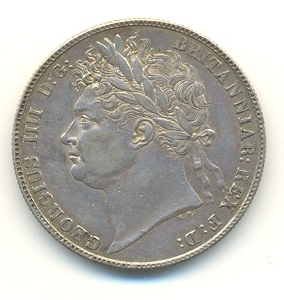
Half-crown of George IV, 1821

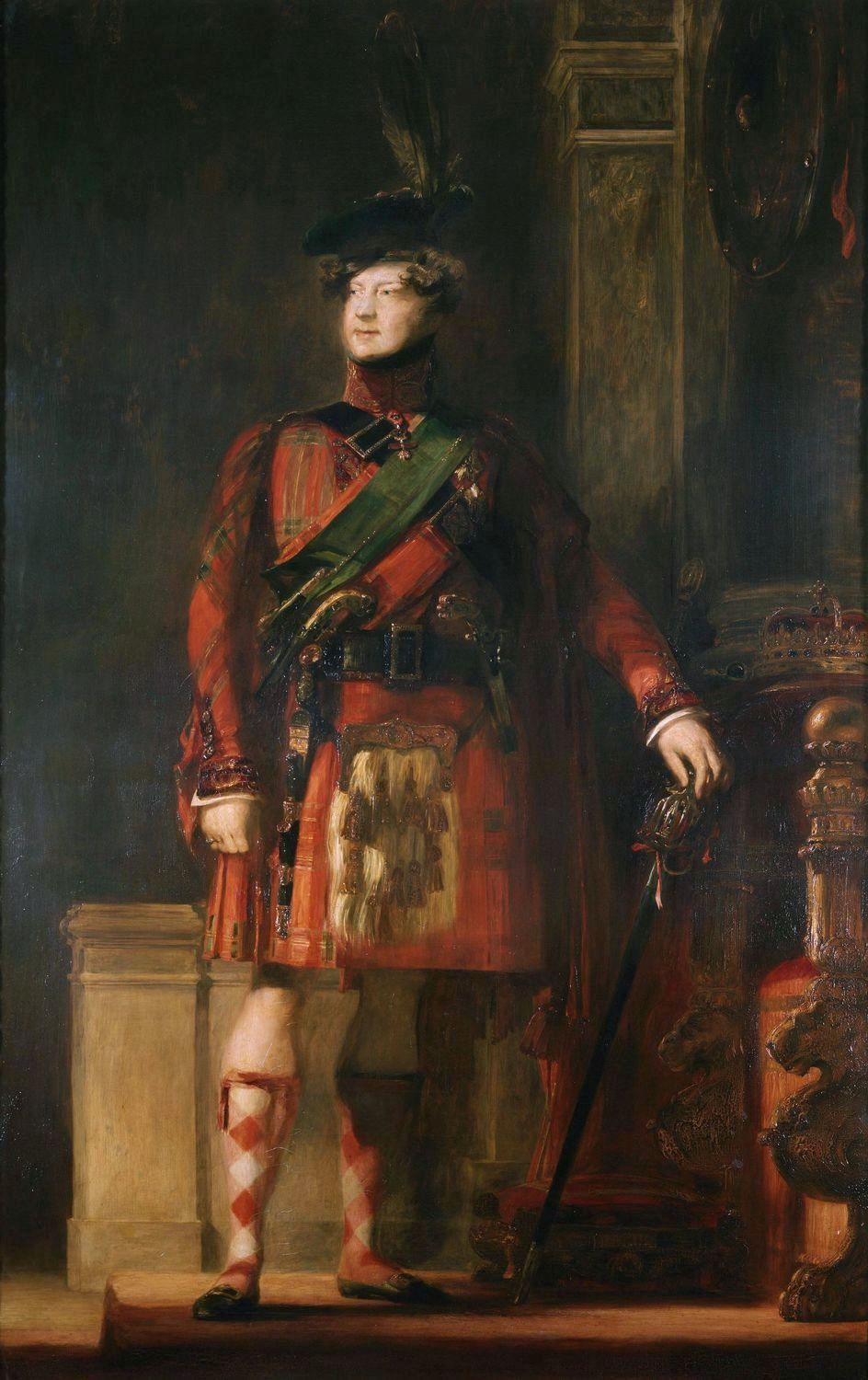
Portrait depicting George during his 1822 trip to Scotland by Sir David Wilkie

A few weeks after the coronation, George visited Ireland, and the following year he visited Edinburgh for "one and twenty daft days". His visit to Scotland, organised by Sir Walter Scott, was the first by a reigning monarch since the mid-17th century.

George spent most of his later reign in seclusion at Windsor Castle, but he continued to intervene in politics. At first it was believed that he would support Catholic emancipation, as he had proposed a Catholic Emancipation Bill for Ireland in 1797, but his anti-Catholic views became clear in 1813 when he privately canvassed against the ultimately defeated Catholic Relief Bill of 1813. By 1824 he was denouncing Catholic emancipation in public. Having taken the coronation oath on his accession, George now argued that he had sworn to uphold the Protestant faith, and could not support any pro-Catholic measures. The influence of the Crown was so great, and the will of the Tories under Prime Minister Liverpool so strong, that Catholic emancipation seemed hopeless. In 1827, however, Liverpool retired, to be replaced by the pro-emancipation Tory George Canning. When Canning entered office, the King, hitherto content with privately instructing his ministers on the Catholic Question, thought it fit to make a public declaration to the effect that his sentiments on the question were those of his revered father, George III.

Canning's views on the Catholic Question were not well received by the most conservative Tories, including the Duke of Wellington. As a result, the ministry was forced to include Whigs. Canning died later in that year, leaving Lord Goderich to lead the tenuous Tory–Whig coalition. Goderich left office in 1828, to be succeeded by Wellington, who had by that time accepted that the denial of some measure of relief to Roman Catholics was politically untenable. George was never as friendly with Wellington as he had been with Canning and chose to annoy the Duke by pretending to have fought at Waterloo disguised as a German general. With great difficulty Wellington obtained the King's consent to the introduction of a Catholic Relief Bill on 29 January 1829. Under pressure from his fanatically anti-Catholic brother Ernest Augustus, Duke of Cumberland, the King withdrew his approval and in protest the Cabinet resigned en masse on 4 March. The next day the King, now under intense political pressure, reluctantly agreed to the Bill and the ministry remained in power. Royal assent was finally granted to the Catholic Relief Act on 13 April.

== Declining health and death ==
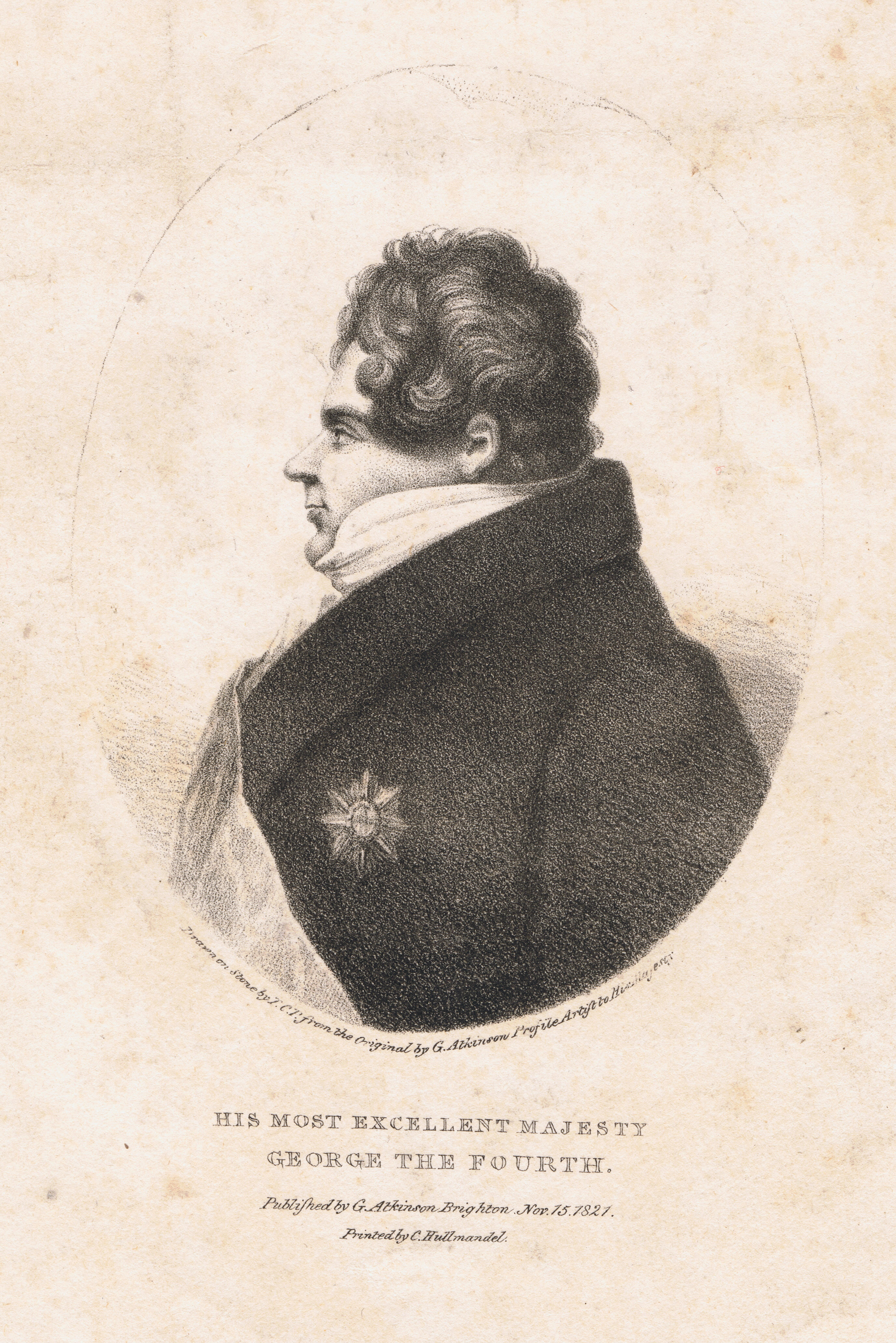
Lithograph of George IV in profile, by George Atkinson, printed by C. Hullmandel, 1821

George's heavy drinking and indulgent lifestyle had taken their toll on his health by the late 1820s. While still Prince of Wales, he had become obese through his huge banquets and copious consumption of alcohol, making him the target of ridicule on the rare occasions that he appeared in public; by 1797, his weight had reached 17 stone 7 pounds (111 kg; 245 lb). By 1824, his corset was made for a waist of 50 inches (130 cm). He had gout, arteriosclerosis, peripheral edema ("dropsy"), and possibly porphyria. In his last years, he spent whole days in bed and had acute and serious spasms of breathlessness.

George's last years were marked by increasing physical and mental decay and withdrawal from public affairs. Privately, a senior aide to the King confided to his diary: "A more contemptible, cowardly, selfish, unfeeling dog does not exist ... There have been good and wise kings but not many of them ... and this I believe to be one of the worst." By December 1828, like his father, George was almost completely blind from cataracts, and had such severe gout in his right hand and arm that he could no longer sign documents. In mid-1829, David Wilkie reported the King "was wasting away frightfully day after day", and had become so obese that he looked "like a great sausage stuffed into the covering". George took laudanum to counteract severe bladder pains, which left him in a drugged and mentally impaired state for days on end. He underwent surgery to remove a cataract in September 1829, by which time he was regularly taking over 100 drops of laudanum before state occasions.

By the spring of 1830, George's imminent end was apparent. Now largely confined to his bedchambers, having completely lost sight in one eye and describing himself "as blind as a beetle", he was forced to approve legislation with a stamp of his signature in the presence of witnesses. His weight was recorded to be 20 stone (130 kg; 280 lb). Attacks of breathlessness due to dropsy forced him to sleep upright in a chair, and doctors frequently tapped his abdomen in order to drain excess fluid. Despite his obvious decline, George was admired for clinging doggedly to life. His will to live and still-prodigious appetite astonished observers; in April 1830, the Duke of Wellington wrote that the King had consumed for breakfast "a Pidgeon and Beef Steak Pye ... Three parts of a bottle of Mozelle, a Glass of Dry Champagne, two Glasses of Port [and] a Glass of Brandy", followed by a large dose of laudanum. Writing to Maria Fitzherbert in June, the King's physician, Sir Henry Halford, noted "His Majesty's constitution is a gigantic one, and his elasticity under the most severe pressure exceeds what I have ever witnessed in thirty-eight years' experience." Though George had been under Halford's care since the time of the Regency, the doctor's social ambitions and perceived lack of competence were strongly criticised, with The Lancet labelling Halford's bulletins on the King's health as "utterly and entirely destitute of information", subsequently characterising Halford's treatment of George, which involved administering both opium and laudanum as sedatives, as appearing to lack sense or direction.

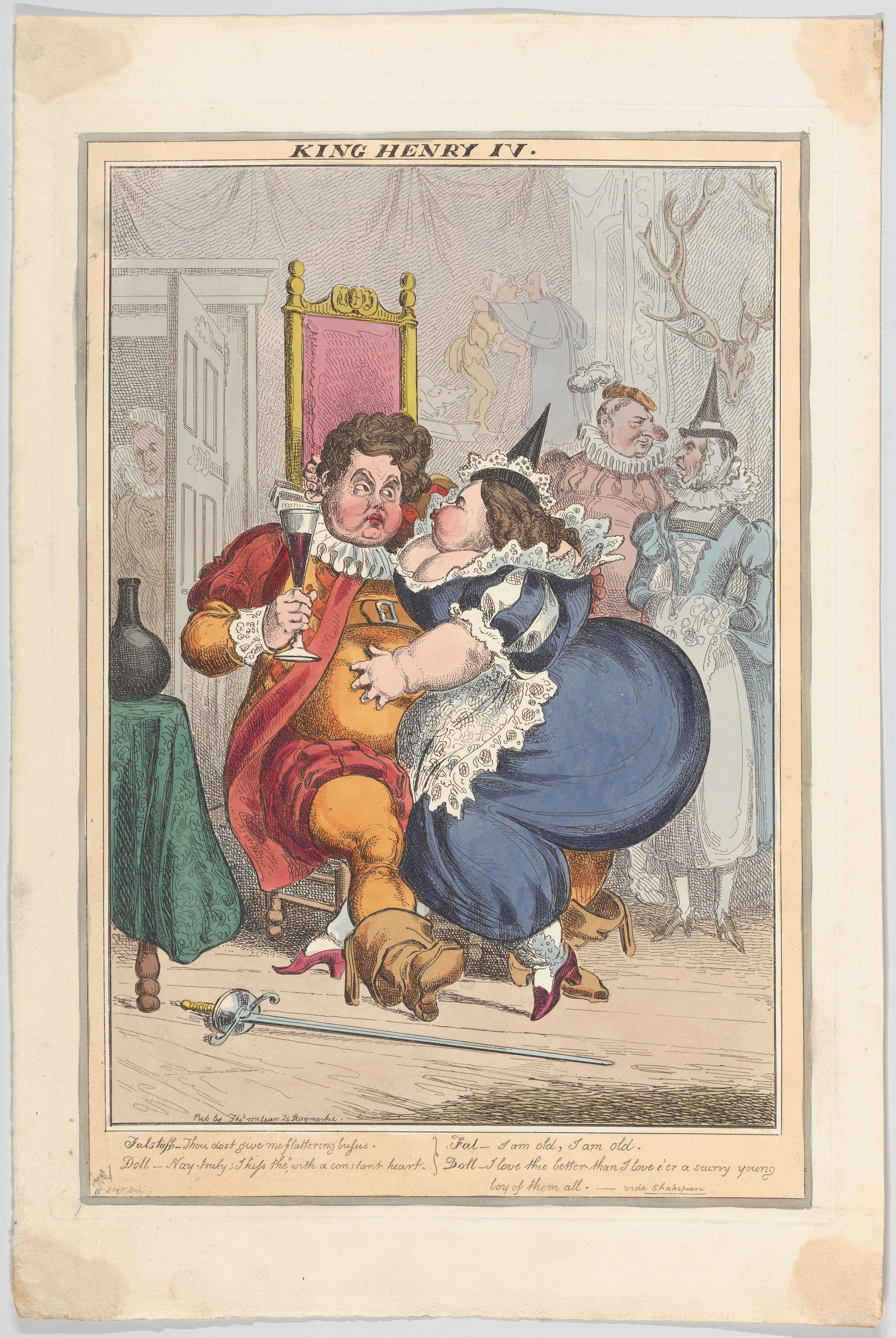
King Henry IV by William Heath, c. 1827

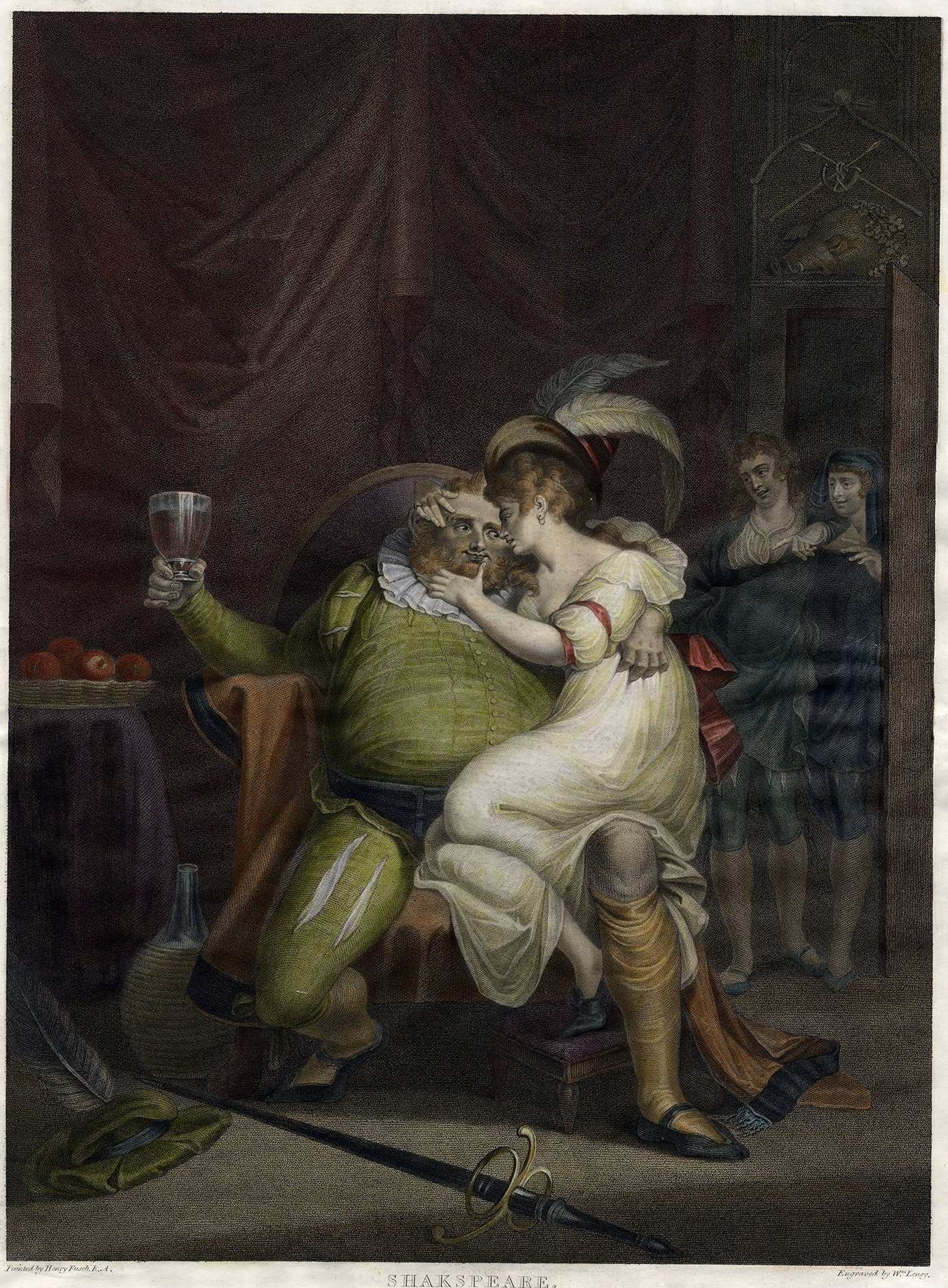
Henry IV Part 2 Act II Scene 4 by Henry Fuseli, 1805

Cartoon (left) of George IV and his mistress Lady Conyngham, satirised as John Falstaff and Doll Tearsheet, mirroring a well known work (right) by Fuseli

George dictated his will in May and became very devout in his final months, confessing to an archdeacon that he repented of his dissolute life, but hoped mercy would be shown to him as he had always tried to do the best for his subjects. By June, he was unable to lie down, and received the Sacrament on 14 June in the presence of Lady Conyngham, Halford, and a clergyman. While Halford only informed the Cabinet on 24 June that "the King's cough continues with considerable expectoration", he privately told his wife that "things are coming to a conclusion ... I shall be released about Monday."

At about three in the morning of 26 June 1830 at Windsor Castle, George awoke and passed a bowel movement – "a large evacuation mix'd with blood". He then sent for Halford, allegedly calling to his servants "Sir Henry! Sir Henry! Fetch him; this is death!" Accounts of George's final moments and last words vary. According to Halford, following his arrival and that of Sir William Knighton, the King's "lips grew livid, and he dropped his head on the page's shoulder ... I was up the stairs in five minutes, and he died but eight minutes afterwards." Other accounts state the King placed his hands on his stomach and said "Surely, this must be death", or that he called out "Good God, what is this?", clasped his page's hand, and said "my boy, this is death". George died at 3:15 am. An autopsy conducted by his physicians revealed George had died from upper gastrointestinal bleeding resulting from the rupture of a blood vessel in his stomach. A large tumour "the size of an orange" was found attached to his bladder; his heart was enlarged, had heavily calcified valves and was surrounded by a large fat deposit. The King was buried in St George's Chapel, Windsor Castle, on 15 July.

== Legacy ==
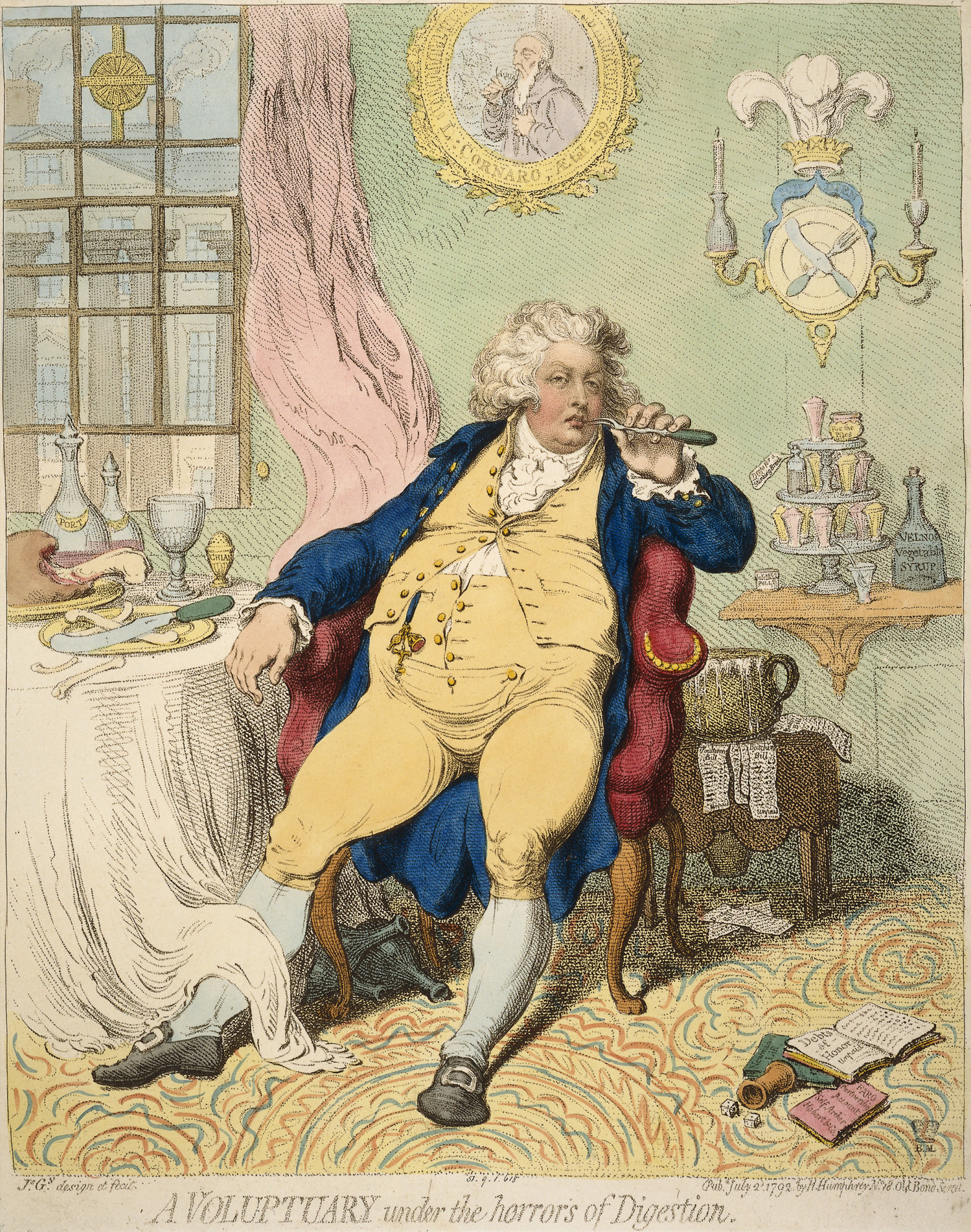
"A VOLUPTUARY under the horrors of Digestion": 1792 caricature by James Gillray from George's time as Prince of Wales

George's only legitimate child, Charlotte, had died from post-partum complications in 1817, after delivering a stillborn son. George III's second son, Frederick, Duke of York and Albany, had died childless in 1827, so the throne passed to the third son of George III, William, Duke of Clarence, who reigned as William IV.

George was described as the "First Gentleman of England" on account of his style and manners. He was bright, clever, and knowledgeable, but his laziness and gluttony led him to squander much of his talent. The Times wrote that he would always prefer "a girl and a bottle to politics and a sermon".

The Regency period saw a shift in fashion that was largely determined by George. After political opponents put a tax on wig powder, he abandoned wearing a powdered wig in favour of natural hair. He wore darker colours than had been previously fashionable as they helped to disguise his size, favoured pantaloons and trousers over knee breeches because they were looser, and popularised a high collar with neck cloth because it hid his double chin. His visit to Scotland in 1822 led to the revival, if not the creation, of Scottish tartan dress as it is known today.

During the political crisis caused by Catholic emancipation, the Duke of Wellington said that George was "the worst man he ever fell in with his whole life, the most selfish, the most false, the most ill-natured, the most entirely without one redeeming quality". However, his eulogy delivered in the House of Lords called George "the most accomplished man of his age" and praised his knowledge and talent. Wellington's true feelings were probably somewhere between these two extremes; as he told Harriet Arbuthnot, George was "a magnificent patron of the arts ... the most extraordinary compound of talent, wit, buffoonery, obstinacy, and good feeling – in short a medley of the most opposite qualities, with a great preponderance of good – that I ever saw in any character in my life."

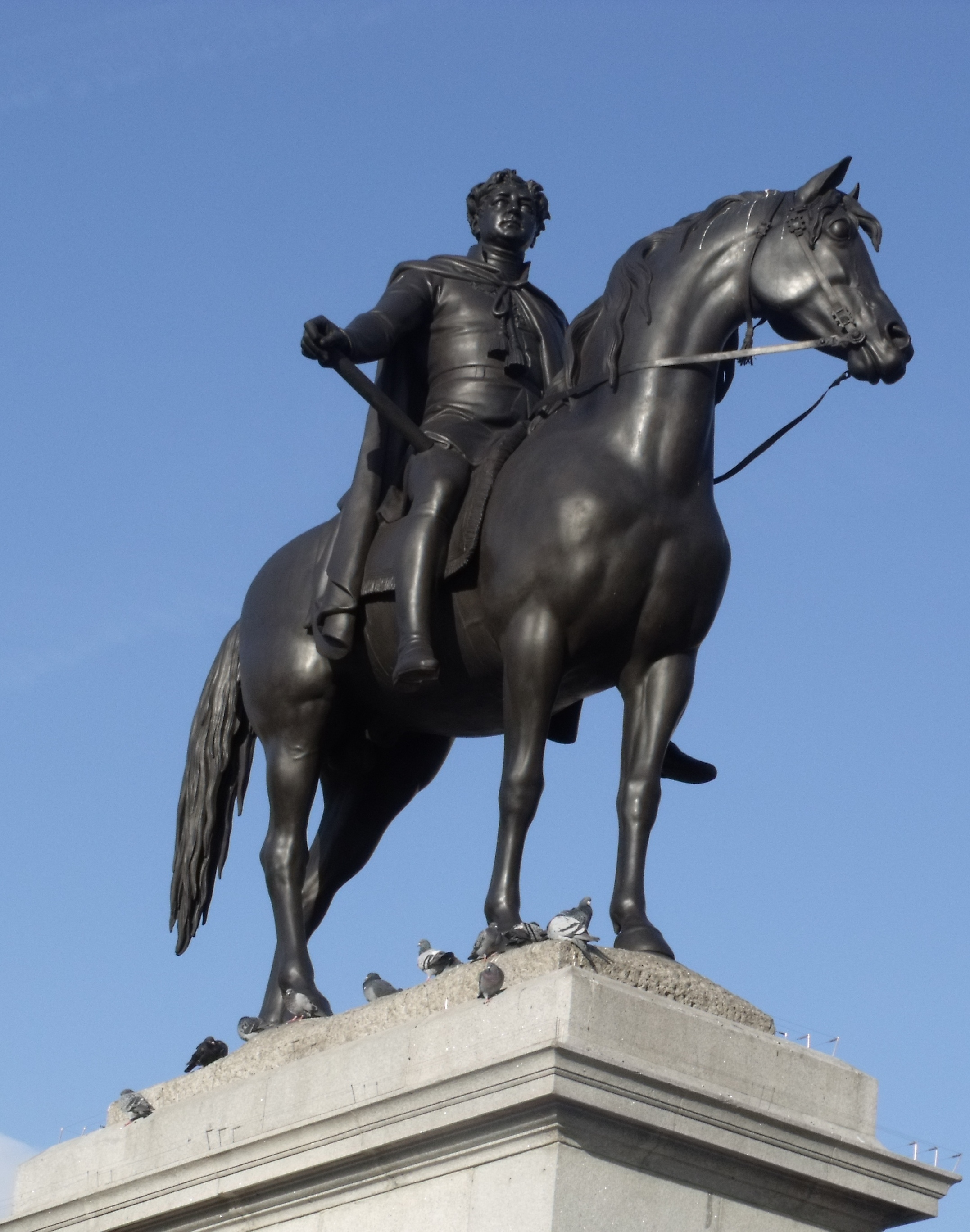
Equestrian statue of George IV, Trafalgar Square, London

After George's death, The Times wrote: "There never was an individual less regretted by his fellow-creatures than this deceased king. What eye has wept for him? What heart has heaved one throb of unmercenary sorrow? ... If he ever had a friend – a devoted friend in any rank of life – we protest that the name of him or her never reached us".

There are many statues of George IV, a large number of which were erected during his reign. In the United Kingdom, they include a bronze statue of him on horseback by Sir Francis Chantrey in Trafalgar Square. Chantrey also crafted the bronze statue outside the Royal Pavilion in Brighton.

In Edinburgh, "George IV Bridge" is a main street linking the Old Town High Street to the north over the ravine of the Cowgate, designed by the architect Thomas Hamilton in 1829 and completed in 1835. King's Cross, now a major transport hub sitting on the border of Camden and Islington in north London, takes its name from a short-lived monument erected to George IV in the early 1830s. A square and a neighbouring park in St Luke's, Islington, are also named after George IV.

== Titles, styles, honours, and arms ==
=== Titles and styles ===
At birth, George was entitled to the dignities Prince of Great Britain and Ireland, Electoral Prince of Brunswick-Lüneburg, Duke of Cornwall, and Duke of Rothesay. Under the Act of Parliament that instituted the regency, the prince's formal title as regent was "Regent of the United Kingdom of Great Britain and Ireland".

=== Honours ===
==== National honours ====
- 26 December 1765: Royal Knight of the Garter
- 21 November 1783: Privy Counsellor
- 26 January 1789: Fellow of the Royal Society
- 2 May 1810: Doctor of Civil Law, University of Oxford
- 28 April 1818: Founder of the Most Distinguished Order of St Michael and St George
- Kingdom of Hanover: 28 April 1815: Founder of the Royal Hanoverian Guelphic Order

==== Foreign honours ====
- Russian Empire:
  - 25 November 1813: Knight of St. Andrew
  - 20 April 1814: Knight of St. Alexander Nevsky
- Kingdom of Prussia: 11 April 1814: Knight of the Black Eagle
- Kingdom of France: 20 April 1814: Knight of the Holy Spirit
- Kingdom of Spain: 5 July 1814: Grand Cross of the Order of Charles III
- United Kingdom of Portugal, Brazil and the Algarves: 7 April 1815: Sash of the Three Orders
- Austrian Empire:
  - 8 June 1815: Knight of the Golden Fleece
  - 1819: Grand Cross of St. Stephen
- Denmark: 4 July 1815: Knight of the Elephant
- Two Sicilies:
  - 1816: Knight of St. Januarius
  - 1816: Grand Cross of St. Ferdinand and Merit
- Netherlands: 27 November 1818: Grand Cross of the Military William Order
- Kingdom of Bavaria: 1826: Knight of St. Hubert

==== Military appointments ====
- 1782: Colonel, British Army
- 1796–1820: Colonel of the 10th Light Dragoons

=== Arms ===
Coats of arms of George IV

As Prince of Wales (1763–1801)

As Prince of Wales and Prince Regent (1801–1820)

As King (1820–1830)

As King (in Scotland) (1820–1830)

George's coat of arms as the Prince of Wales was the royal arms (with an inescutcheon of Gules plain in the Hanoverian quarter), differenced by a label of three points Argent. The arms included the royal crest and supporters but with the single arched coronet of his rank, all charged on the shoulder with a similar label. His arms followed the change in the royal arms in 1801, when the Hanoverian quarter became an inescutcheon and the French quarter was dropped altogether. The 1816 alteration did not affect him as it only applied to the arms of the King.

As king, George's arms were those of his two kingdoms, the United Kingdom and Hanover, superimposed: Quarterly, I and IV Gules three lions passant guardant in pale Or (for England); II Or a lion rampant within a double tressure flory-counter-flory Gules (for Scotland); III Azure a harp Or stringed Argent (for Ireland); overall an escutcheon tierced in pall reversed (for Hanover), I Gules two lions passant guardant Or (for Brunswick), II Or a semy of hearts Gules a lion rampant Azure (for Lüneburg), III Gules a horse courant Argent (for Westphalia), overall an inescutcheon Gules charged with the crown of Charlemagne Or, the whole escutcheon surmounted by a crown.

== Ancestry ==
Ancestors of George IV

8. George II of Great Britain
4. Frederick, Prince of Wales
9. Princess Caroline of Brandenburg-Ansbach
2. George III of the United Kingdom
10. Frederick II, Duke of Saxe-Gotha-Altenburg
5. Princess Augusta of Saxe-Gotha-Altenburg
11. Princess Magdalena Augusta of Anhalt-Zerbst
1. George IV of the United Kingdom
12. Adolphus Frederick II, Duke of Mecklenburg-Strelitz
6. Duke Charles Louis Frederick of Mecklenburg-Strelitz
13. Princess Christiane Emilie of Schwarzburg-Sondershausen
3. Princess Charlotte of Mecklenburg-Strelitz
14. Ernest Frederick I, Duke of Saxe-Hildburghausen
7. Princess Elisabeth Albertine of Saxe-Hildburghausen
15. Countess Sophia Albertine of Erbach-Erbach

== Notes ==
George IV House of Hanover Cadet branch of the House of Welf Born: 12 August 1762 Died: 26 June 1830
Regnal titles
| Preceded by George III | King of the United Kingdom and Hanover; 29 January 1820 – 26 June 1830 | Succeeded by William IV |
British royalty
| Vacant Title last held by George (III) | Prince of Wales; 1762–1820 | Vacant Title next held by Albert Edward |
| Vacant Title last held by Frederick | Duke of Cornwall; Duke of Rothesay; 1762–1820 | Vacant Title next held by Albert Edward |
Military offices
| Preceded by Sir William Augustus Pitt | Colonel of the 10th (The Prince of Wales's Own); Royal Regiment of (Light) Dragoons (Hussars); 1796–1820 | Succeeded by The Lord Stewart |
Masonic offices
| Preceded by The Duke of Cumberland | Grand Master of the Premier; Grand Lodge of England; 1790–1813 | Succeeded by The Duke of Sussex |
Other offices
| Preceded by The Duke of Portland | President of the Foundling Hospital; 1809–1820 | Succeeded by The Duke of York and Albany |
| Previous: Caroline of Ansbach as Regent of Great Britain | Regent of the United Kingdom; 5 February 1811 – 29 January 1820; Became King | Most recent |
