= Royal Plaza =

Royal Plaza, Royal Square, or similar may refer to:

== Public places ==
- Plaça Reial, Barcelona, Catalonia, Spain
- Place des Vosges, Paris, France, originally Place Royale
- Place Royale, Brussels, Belgium
- Place Royale, Reims, France
- Place Royale, Quebec City, Quebec, Canada
- Royal Plaza (Bangkok), Thailand
- Royal Square of Esfahan, Iran, now Naqsh-e Jahan Square
- Royal Square, St Helier, Jersey, United Kingdom

== Hotels ==
- Royal Plaza Hotel (Florida), U.S., now B Resort & Spa
- Royal Plaza Hotel (Hong Kong)
- Royal Plaza Hotel (Nakhon Ratchasima), Thailand, which collapsed in 1993

== Other uses ==
- Royal Plaza (Surabaya), East Java, Indonesia, a shopping mall
- Place du Royaume, a shopping centre in Saguenay, Quebec, Canada

== See also ==
- Queen Square (disambiguation)
- King's Square (disambiguation)
