= The Queen's Square =

The Queen's Square may refer to:

- A short story by Dorothy Sayers, originally published in Hangman's Holiday
- The village centre in Adeyfield, Hertfordshire, England

== See also ==
- Queen's Square (disambiguation)
