= Queen Square =

Queen Square or Queen's Square may refer to

== Places ==
=== United Kingdom ===
- Queen Square, Bath, England
- Queen Square, Bristol, England
  - Queen Square House, Bristol
- Queen Square, London, England
- Queen Square bus station, Liverpool, England
- Queen Square, Wolverhampton, England
- Queen's Square, Wrexham, Wales

=== Elsewhere ===
- Queens Square, Fremantle, Australia
- Queen Square (Dartmouth), Nova Scotia, Canada
- Queen's Square, Sydney, Australia
- Republic Square, Valletta, formerly Queen's Square, Malta
- Queen's Square (Belize House constituency)

== Other uses ==
- Queen Square reflex hammer, a medical instrument

== See also ==
- The Queen's Square (disambiguation)
- King's Square (disambiguation)
- Royal Plaza (disambiguation)
