= Königsplatz =

Königsplatz (German, 'King's Square') may refer to the following places in Germany:

- Königsplatz, Munich
  - Königsplatz (Munich U-Bahn)
- Königsplatz, Berlin, now known as Platz der Republik

== See also ==
- King's Square (disambiguation)
