= John Dolan (artist) =

English street artist (1971–2022)

- Born: Islington, London
- Died: 20 October 2022; London, England
- Known for: street art

John Dolan (died 20 October 2022) was a British street artist from the King Square area of London.

== Life ==
John Dolan grew up in King Square area of London, with parents Gerry and Dot. He had two brothers, David and Malcolm, and two sisters, Jackie and Marilyn. When John was 10, his father told him that his sister, Marilyn, was in fact his biological mother, and his biological father was a local man named Jimmy, who remained in his life and was treated appallingly by his son. Marilyn however hardly had any contact with her son John.

In his earlier years, John was a homeless person and a heroin addict. By 2009 he had been in prison more than 30 times, for a total of about 12 years, and had over 300 convictions. He began drawing, sitting with his dog on Shoreditch High Street and selling his drawings to passers-by. Some of his drawings were included in a limited-edition art book, Shoreditch Unbound, in 2011. A successful exhibition of his work was held in Shoreditch in September 2013, and a second exhibition was held in 2014.

Dolan was no longer homeless at the end of his life, and had stopped using heroin. His book John and George: The Dog Who Changed My Life was published by Random House in July 2014. He helped charities such as Unicef and The Big Issue Foundation. In January 2015, he was among the speakers at a TEDx event in Bethnal Green.
