= King Square Gardens =

Park in London, England

Coordinates: 51°31′39″N 0°5′56″W

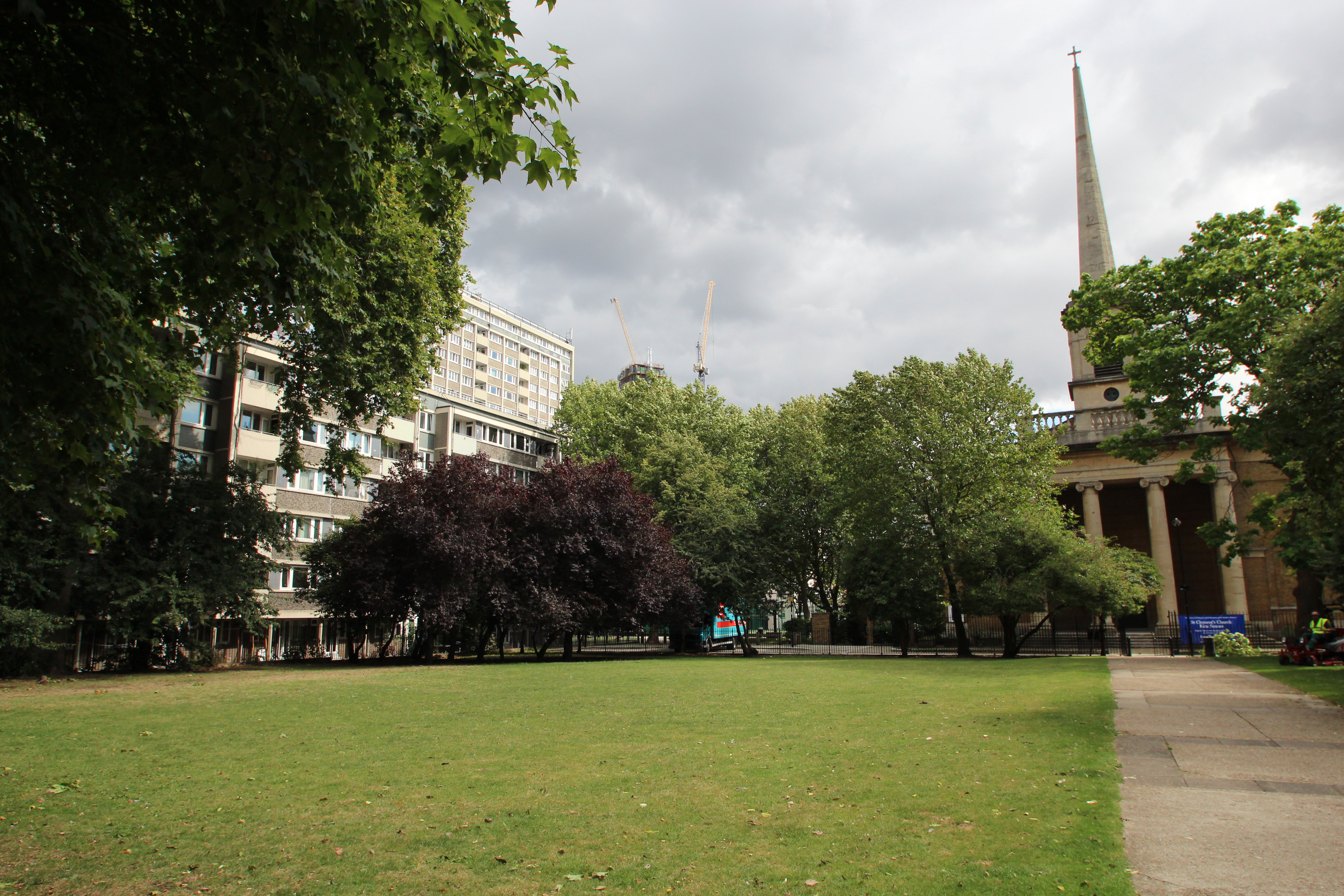
A view of the Kings Square Gardens

King Square Gardens is a park in the area of St Luke's in the London Borough of Islington, to the west of King Square. The park is designated as a Site of Local Importance to Nature Conservation. The park was used in the opening scene of the Pink Floyd song Another Brick in the Wall Part 2 from 1979.

== Location and transport ==
The park borders Goswell Road to the East, Lever Street to the South, and the King Square to the West. To the North of the park is the urban development including high-rise President and Turnpike Houses, as well as Moreland Primary School and the early 19th century St Clement's Church.

Nearest bus stops are on Goswell Road, served by bus routes 4 and 56. The park is approximately 10 minutes walk from Angel, Barbican, and Old Street tube stations.
