= St Clement's Church, King Square =

St Clement's, King Square
- St Clement's Church, King Square; London
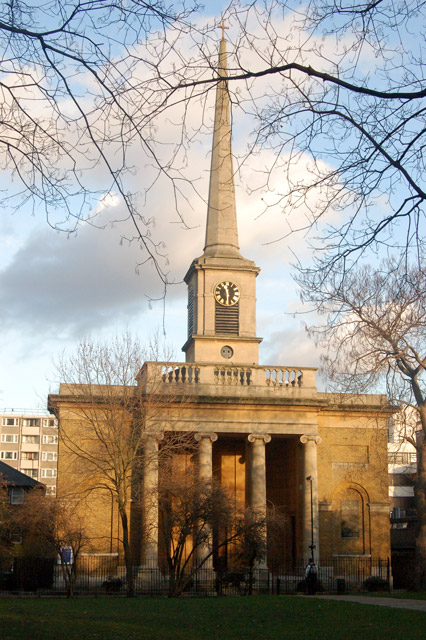
- St Clement's, King Square
- Location: King Square, City of London
- Country: England
- Denomination: Church of England
- Churchmanship: Anglo-Catholic
- Website: Church website

History
- Founded: 1824

Architecture
- Years built: 1824

Administration
- Diocese: Diocese of London
- Archdeaconry: Archdeaconry of London
- Parish: Parish of St Clement with St Barnabas and St Matthew, Finsbury

Clergy
- Bishop: Bishop of London
- Priest: Fr David Allen

St Clement's Church, King Square, is a Church of England parish church in Finsbury, Central London, in the London Borough of Islington. It is adjacent to King Square, within a walking distance from City Road.

== Construction ==
Church Building Commission purchased the land in King Square from the St Bartholomew's Hospital in 1822 for the construction of a new church fronting a newly built garden square of middle-class villas. Foundation stone was laid on 27 January 1822. French ex-prisoners-of-war and the local community were likely involved in the construction.

The building was designed by the neo-classical architect Thomas Hardwick, designer of St Marylebone Parish church. The design style was Greek (Ionic), though it features a slender spire, traditionally a Gothic feature. Construction was completed in July 1824 and cost £17,000. In its original layout and with galleries on three sides the church had space for 1600 worshipers; it was consecrated as St Barnabas, King Square on 12 June 1826. At the time the church was part of the St Luke's parish; it was designated a separate parish in 1846.

== 20th century ==
In 1940 the church and nearby housing in the parish suffered damage from German bombing in the London Blitz. The burned out church was repaired and the formerly plain galleried interior re-ordered in 1953 by architects working with designer Norman Haines with a compact interior of considerable grandeur. The sanctuary and nave are framed by giant Corinthian columns and pilasters and there is a neo-classical plaster ceiling. Some fittings from St Clement's church and the fine 18th century pulpit from St Marylebone chapel we re-used. The altar sits beneath a corinthian baldacchino and two huge classical urns flank the altar.

On completion in 1952 the parishes of St Barnabas, St Clement, Lever Street and St Matthew, City Road were united as the other two churches were badly damaged by bombing. Re-consecrated on 12 June 1954 at which point parish changed its name to St Clement with St Barnabas and St Matthew, and the church known as St Clement's Finsbury for short. The building is Grade II listed and is the only survival of the King Square of 1822.

== Organ ==
The church organ was built by "Father" Willis for St Thomas, Agar Town in the 1870s and moved to St Clements as part of the 1950s reconstruction, with some alterations, by Manders.

== See also ==
- List of churches and cathedrals of London
- Parish official website https://www.stclementfinsbury.org/

Coordinates: 51.527753°N 0.097744°W
