= King Square, London =

Square in Islington, London, England

Coordinates: 51°31′38.46″N 0°5′52.53″W

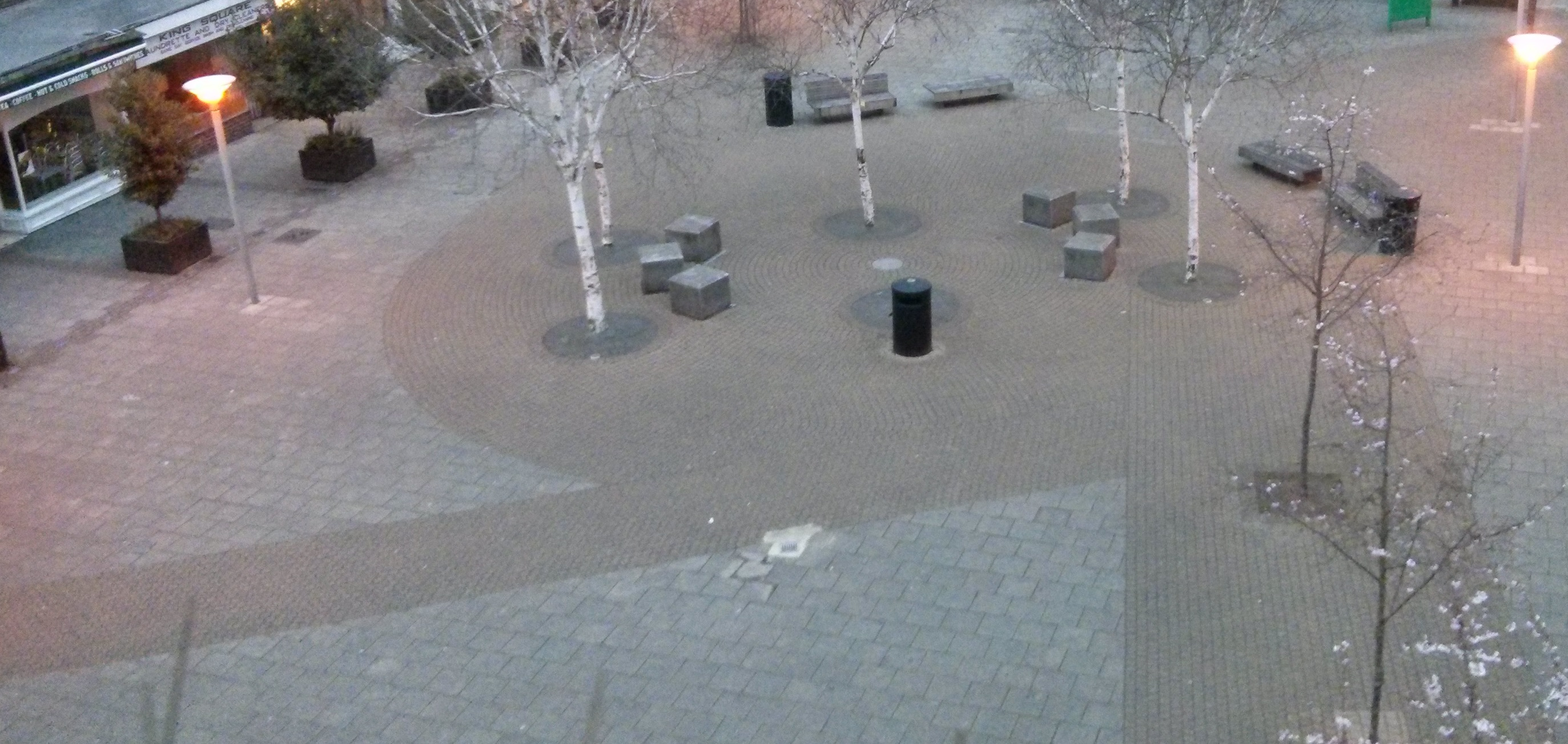
King Square

King Square is a square in central London, in the St Luke's area of the London Borough of Islington. It is at the corner of Lever Street and Central Street, and shares in King Square Gardens to the west.

It is two green courtyards, one of a semi-private nature hemmed in by mid-rise blocks at the corner of Lever Street and Central Street; and King Square Gardens which takes the only street named as the 'Square', namely as its east side, and uses Lever Street and part of Goswell Road (designated part of the A1) for its other sides.

== Surroundings ==
The square is surrounded by restaurants, cafeterias, a newsagent's, a florist shop, a pub and somewhat modernist, mid-rise housing. 19th century St Clement's Church stands in the corner of the square. On the other side of Central Street stands Thistle City Barbican Hotel.

== History ==
The square originally lined with spacious housing for wealthy Londoners to live in a convenient distance from the City was laid out between 1822 and 1825 on land belonging to St Bartholomew's Hospital. It was named after King George IV, the ex-prince regent and constitutional monarch of the British Empire.

In 1824 the construction of a church at the square (then called St Barnabas) was completed. During Victorian times, the social composition of the area changed and the housing was occupied mostly by poorer Londoners, with houses divided into smaller flats. The area now occupied by the square was badly damaged during the Blitz and the houses were demolished in the 1950s.

It is now thought that Lenin stayed in King Square for a few weeks in 1907 while attending a conference of the Russian Social Democratic Labour Party (RSDLP).

In 1959 Finsbury Borough Council ordered the construction of the King Square Estate surrounding the square; work was completed in 1965. The estate was designed by Emberton, Franck and Tardrew and built from pre-cast concrete. Turnpike House, the tallest tower was completed in 1965; it stands to the west of King Square Gardens, with a ground-level arch providing entrance to the park. President House, a collection of six-storey blocks, was built to the north of the park.

== Transport ==
The nearest bus stops are located on the nearby Goswell Road (London Bus routes 4 and 56) as well as City Road (route 43). The square is approximately 10 minutes walk from Angel, Barbican, and Old Street tube stations, and 12 minutes from Farringdon station.
