= North Library (Islington) =

Public library in the London Borough of Islington, England

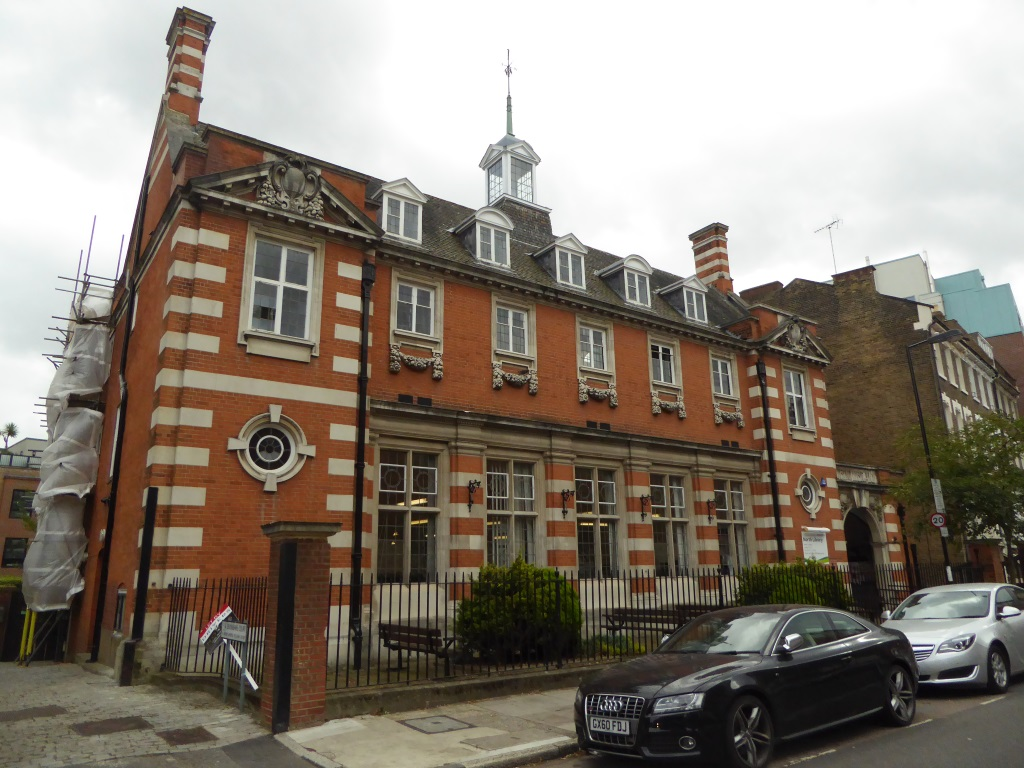
- The library in 2016
- 51.561°N 0.122°W
- Location: Upper Holloway, London, United Kingdom
- Type: Public library
- Established: 29 September 1906; 119 years ago
- Architect: Henry T. Hare
- Branch of: Islington Libraries

Collection
- Size: 20,362

Access and use
- Circulation: 40,143 (2024/25)

Other information
- Director: Nick Tranmer
- Public transit access: Holloway Road; Archway; Upper Holloway
- Website: Official website

Listed Building – Grade II
- Designated: 30 September 1994
- Reference no.: 1195679

North Library is a public library in the London Borough of Islington, England.

Located in Upper Holloway, it is the borough's oldest library, opening in 1906. In the UK, it was innovative in its embrace of open-access shelving and children's spaces. It was awarded Grade II listed status in 1994.

== History ==
The North Library was opened on 29 September 1906 by Alderman Henry Mills JP, Mayor of Islington. The opening symbolized the success of a half-century campaign to bring public libraries to Islington. Andrew Carnegie contributed £7,000 towards the cost of building the library, as part of a grant that saw the construction of 4 Carnegie libraries across Islington. Upon its opening, 14,000 books collected by Revd Robert Spears for the Highgate Hill Unitarian Church were given to the library system.

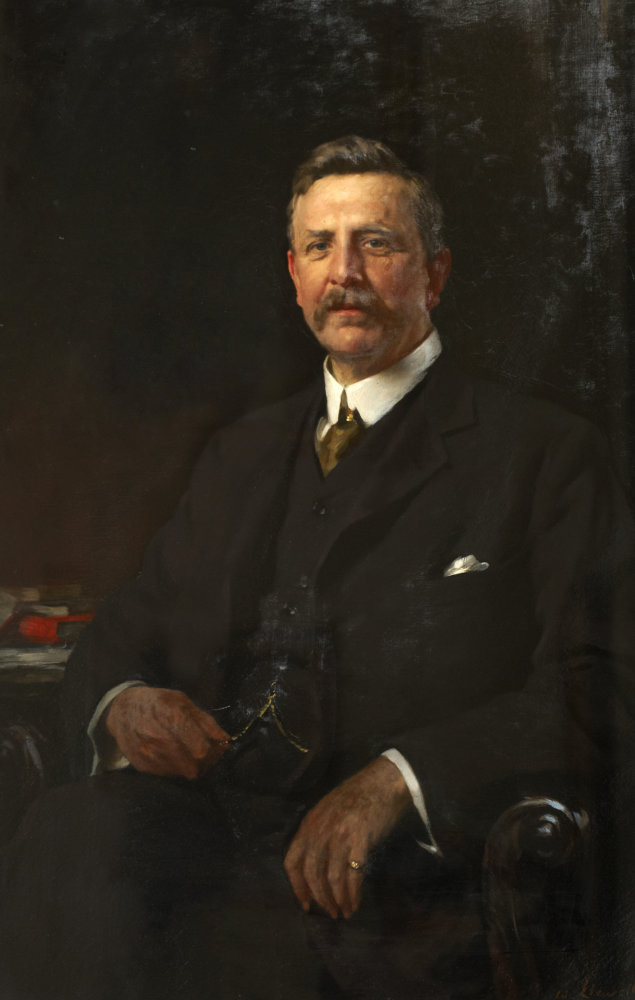
Henry T Hare was famous for including a hare somewhere in his designs

The library was designed by Henry T. Hare, who was also responsible for Islington's Central Library, and several other Carnegie libraries across Britain, including central libraries in Hammersmith (1905), Southend-on-Sea (1905) and Fulham (1908).

The building is made of red brick and stone, with oak wood-work on the inside. Prior to its opening, The Times called it a "handsome" building, and reflected on how the library

"standing, as it does, with its back to a large garden, is very quiet and exceptionally well lighted, and cool, being ventilated with electric fans."

The library's structure benefitted from innovations pioneered in the UK by James Duff Brown, the incoming Borough Librarian. He had previously served as librarian of the Clerkenwell Free Library, where he had redesigned the library space to include open-shelving (allowing patrons to browse and select books directly, rather than requesting them at a desk), and a dedicated children's library. The North Library was designed explicitly to embrace these innovations.

Plans for the North Library by Henry Hare

The main lending library, on the first floor, was designed to make it easy for visitors to take advantage of the open-access shelving, with books arranged by subject. The room was designed specifically to be able to handle a radial stack (see plans), and allows a visitor to see every part of the room, while wasting the least amount of space. James Duff Brown noted the success of this arrangement for the North Library, in a 1908 lecture discussing the state of British municipal libraries:

"The libraries which have adopted this system are very much used, and one of them, the North Islington Branch, circulates more books annually than many considerable provincial towns. The dangers of admitting the public to their own books have been greatly exaggerated, and the experience of all the existing open-access libraries is that losses and misplacements are insignificant; while the borrowers have improved greatly in intelligence and ability to handle and select books."

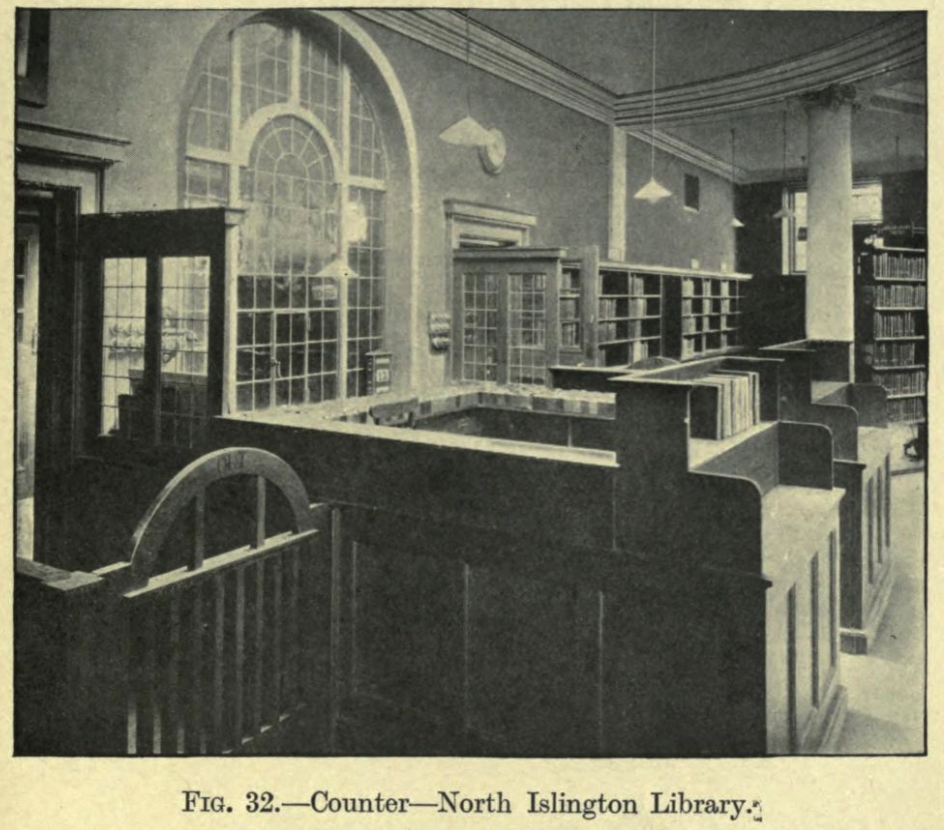
The book counter at the Islington North Library, 1915

The original children's reading room was given a prime location on the ground floor, and contained 3,000 out of the original 20,000 volumes of the library. On its walls were "gay pictures of English life and history."

The original building also had a lecture room (with an electric projection lantern), and a dark room for photography. The North London Photographic Society, started in 1905, was given free use of the dark room and the lecture room.

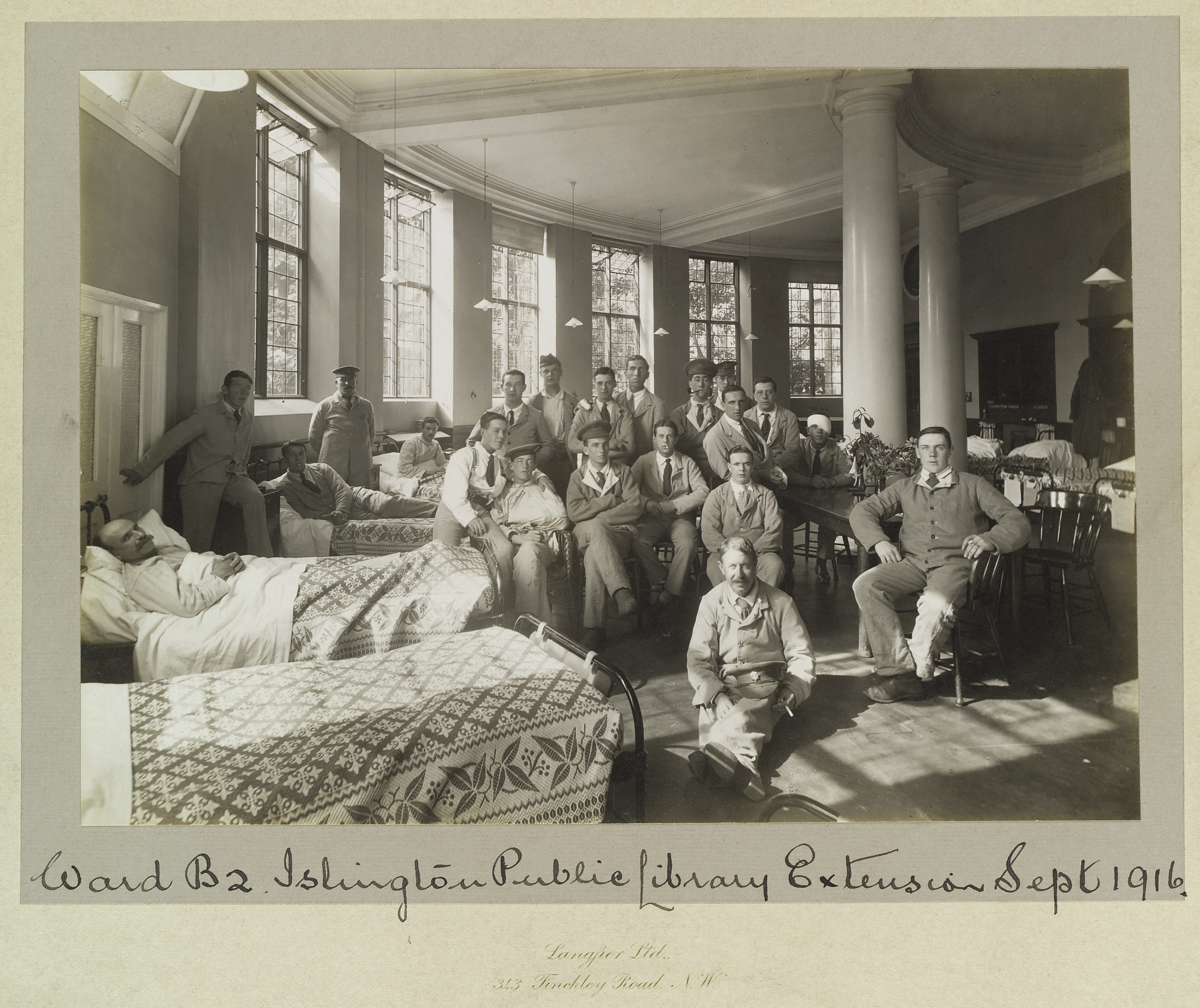
An extension of the library served as a hospital ward during World War I

Between 1916 and 1919, the library was used as a military hospital. The library had capacity for 80 hospital beds, and saw 2,045 men pass through for treatment. The library was paid £260 (approximately £30,000 in 2018) by the War Office as an ‘Act of Grace’, and reopened in 1921.

In 1986, a day of festivities celebrated the 80th anniversary of the library's opening.

In the 2000s, lottery funding contributed to major improvements in the facilities of the North library.

== Services ==
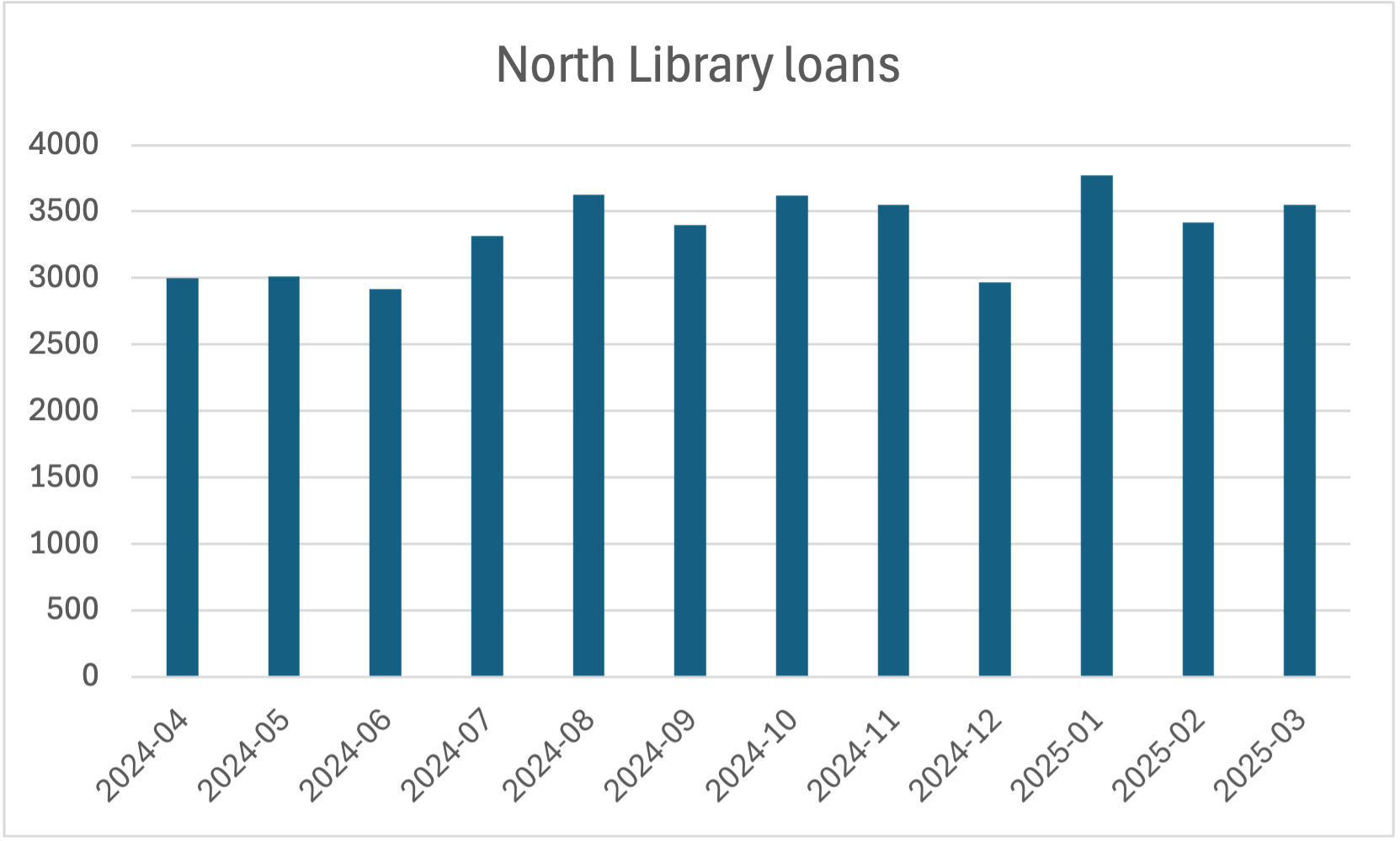
Loans increase over the summer months.

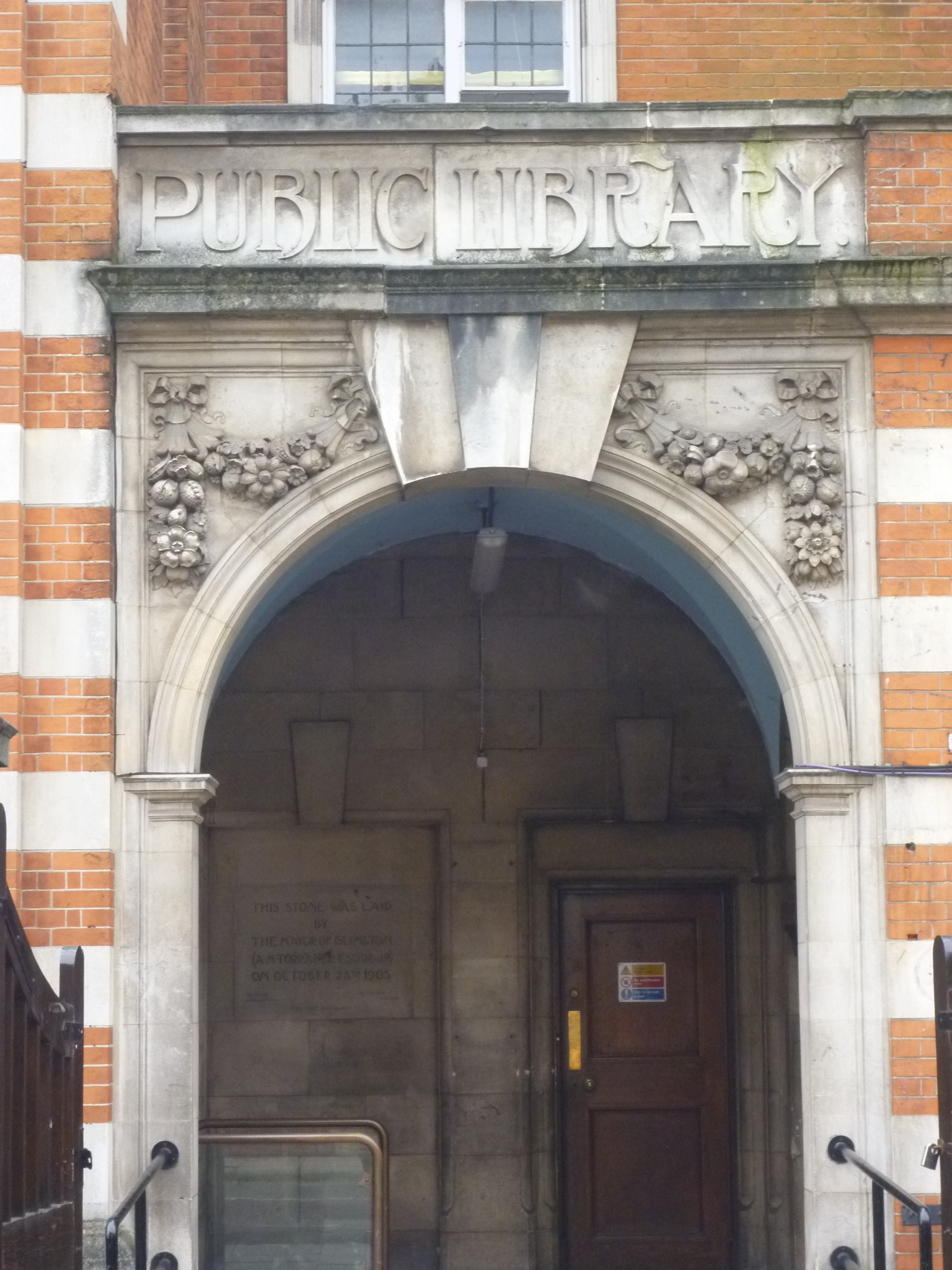
The library entrance

In 2024/25, the Library had 1,663 active members (6th in the service), and 46,401 visits over the year (7th in the service). On average, it performed 3,345 loans per month (6th in the service), rising to 3,500 loans in the summer months. The Library also has a toy library, where parents can borrow toys for their children.

On top of serving as a lending library, North Library provides access to 10 free public computers, free wifi, and printing facilities.

The North Library Hall can host around 60 people. In 2024/25, the library hosted events including included Easy Read (an adult literacy initiative which links adults to volunteer coaches), migrant help sessions, and Age UK information sessions about how to write a will or Power of Attorney. In 2024/25, North Library welcomed 7,385 attendees for events – 11% of attendees to all Islington Library events.

The library is wheelchair accessible, with automatic double doors at the main entrance, and a lift providing access between the ground and first floors.

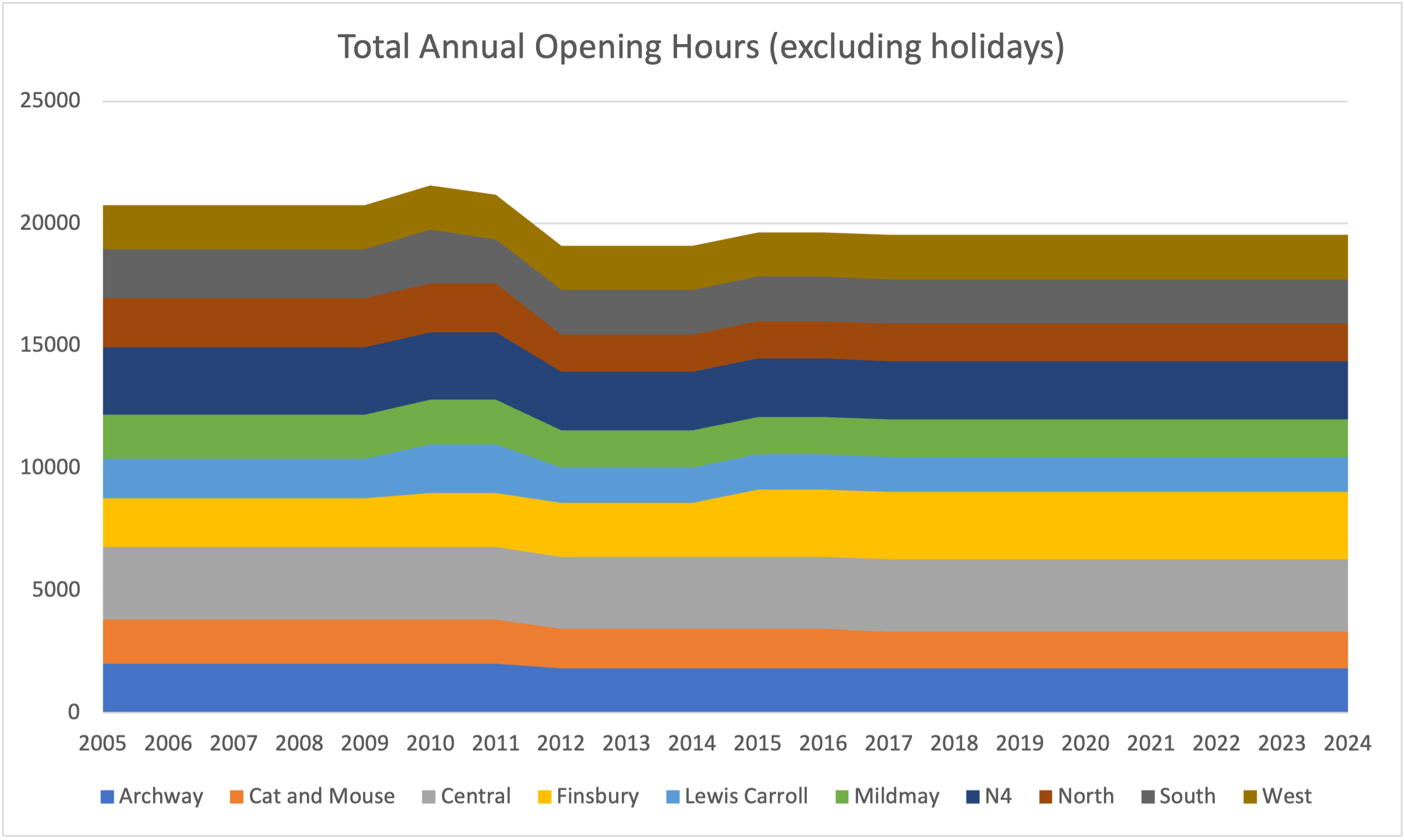
North library saw its opening hours drop by 25% following budget cuts in 2011.

Following budget cuts in 2010/2011, the North Library saw its annual opening hours cut by the largest share among the branches of Islington Libraries. In 2024, North Library was open for a total of 1530 hours, around 25% less than in 2011, and about half the hours of the Central and Finsbury branches. The library is closed on Mondays, Wednesdays and Sundays, and only open partially on Fridays and Saturdays.

== See also ==
- Islington Borough Council
- Islington Libraries
- Henry T. Hare
