= Islington Central Library =

Public library in London

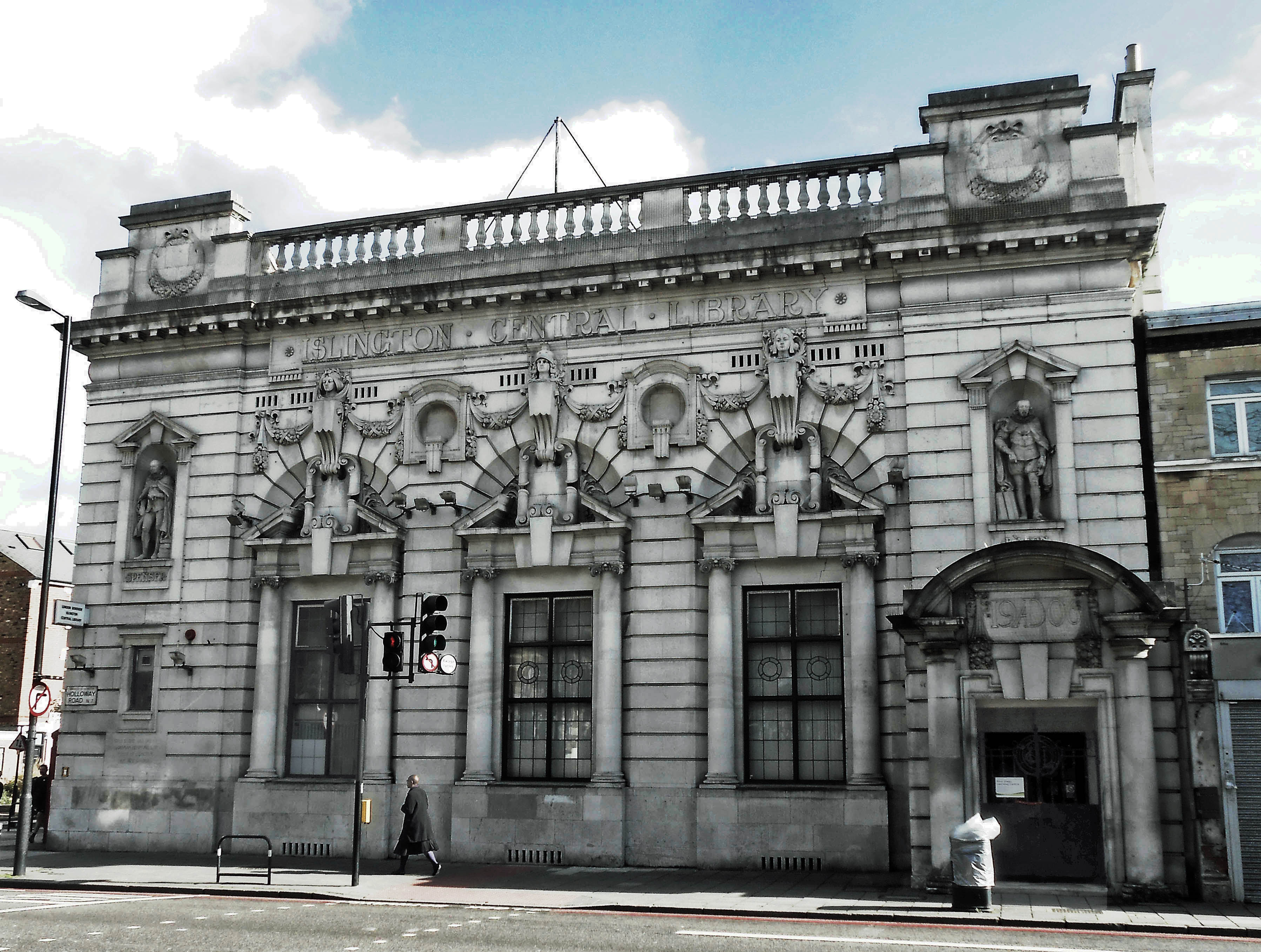
- The library in March 2014
- 51°32′56″N 0°06′25″W
- Location: 2 Fieldway Cres; London, United Kingdom
- Type: Public library
- Established: 1907; 119 years ago
- Architect: Henry T. Hare
- Branch of: Islington Libraries

Collection
- Size: 39,734

Access and use
- Circulation: 133,782 (2024/25)

Other information
- Director: Moya Kapas
- Public transit access: Highbury & Islington; Holloway Road; Drayton Park
- Website: Official website

Listed Building – Grade II
- Designated: 29 September 1972
- Reference no.: 1292581

The Islington Central Library is the central facility of the Islington Libraries system, and was opened in 1907. At the time of its opening, it was the largest municipal library in London. It was awarded Grade II listed status in 1972.

Its address is 2 Fieldway Crescent, off of Holloway Road, in the Highbury neighborhood of Islington.

== History ==
=== Construction ===
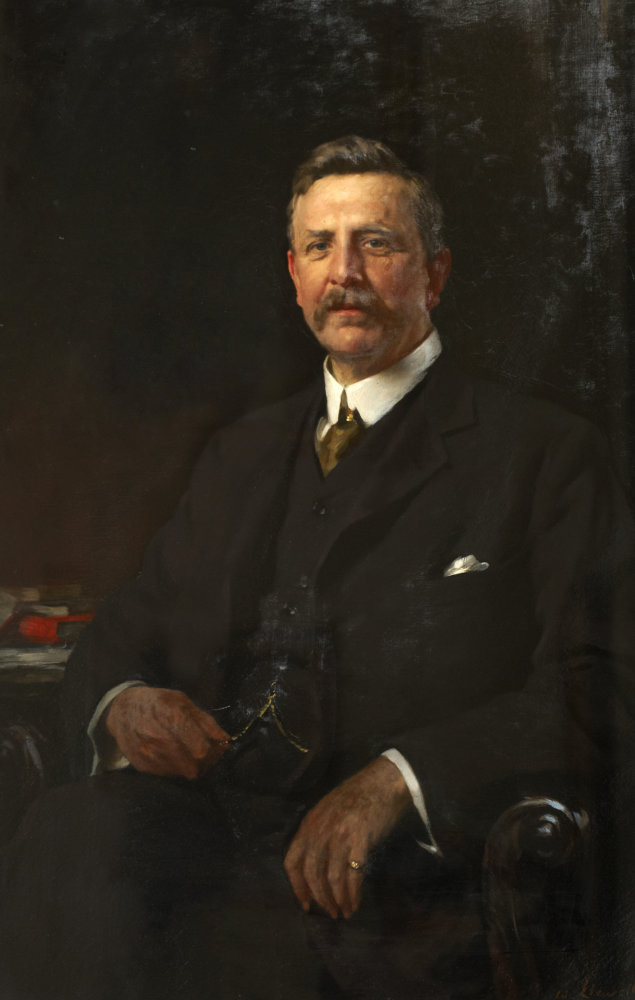
Henry T Hare was famous for including a hare somewhere in his designs

The library was designed by Henry T. Hare, who was also responsible for several other Carnegie libraries across Britain, including Islington's North Library and central libraries in Hammersmith (1905), Southend-on-Sea (1905) and Fulham (1908). Construction on the library started in 1906, with CP Roberts as builder. The foundation stone was laid by Alderman Henry Mills JP, Mayor of Islington, on 16 June 1906.

This library, along with three others in Islington (South, North and West) are Carnegie Libraries, libraries built in part with funding from Andrew Carnegie. In the case of the Central Library, funding provided by Carnegie totaled £20,000.

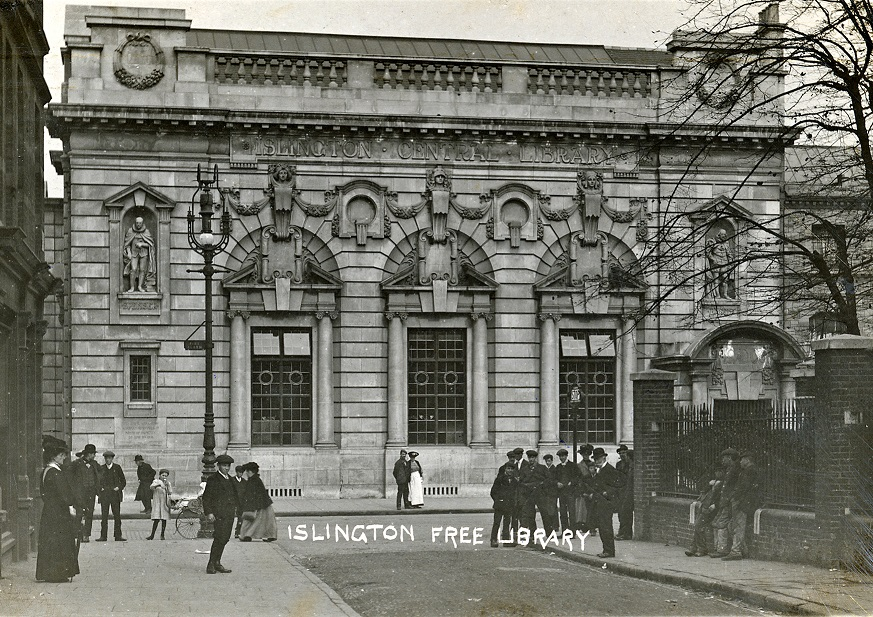
A photo of the Central Library in the year after its opening

The building was opened on 24 October 1907 by Arthur Rucker, principal of the University of London. He declared that public libraries were for three classes of readers: "those who read for amusement, those who read for the purpose of advancing their education, and those who read for the sake of reading, and who gloried in the masterpieces of literature."

James Duff Brown was the inaugural chief librarian. At the time of its opening, the reference library had a collection of 5,000 books in English, French and German.

=== Renovation ===
In 1973–1976, a new extension was added to the building, shifting the entrance from Holloway Road to Fieldway crescent, with the main space behind the historic entrance turned into storage space.

A renovation project, begun in 2019, led to the redevelopment of the 2nd floor reference library, and the creation of a new space for the First Steps Learning Centre on the 1st floor. In January 2022, the final phase of the project was completed, with a refurbished lending library, a new space dedicated to the Tall Stories Theatre Company, and the re-opening of the historic Holloway Road entrance.

== Building ==
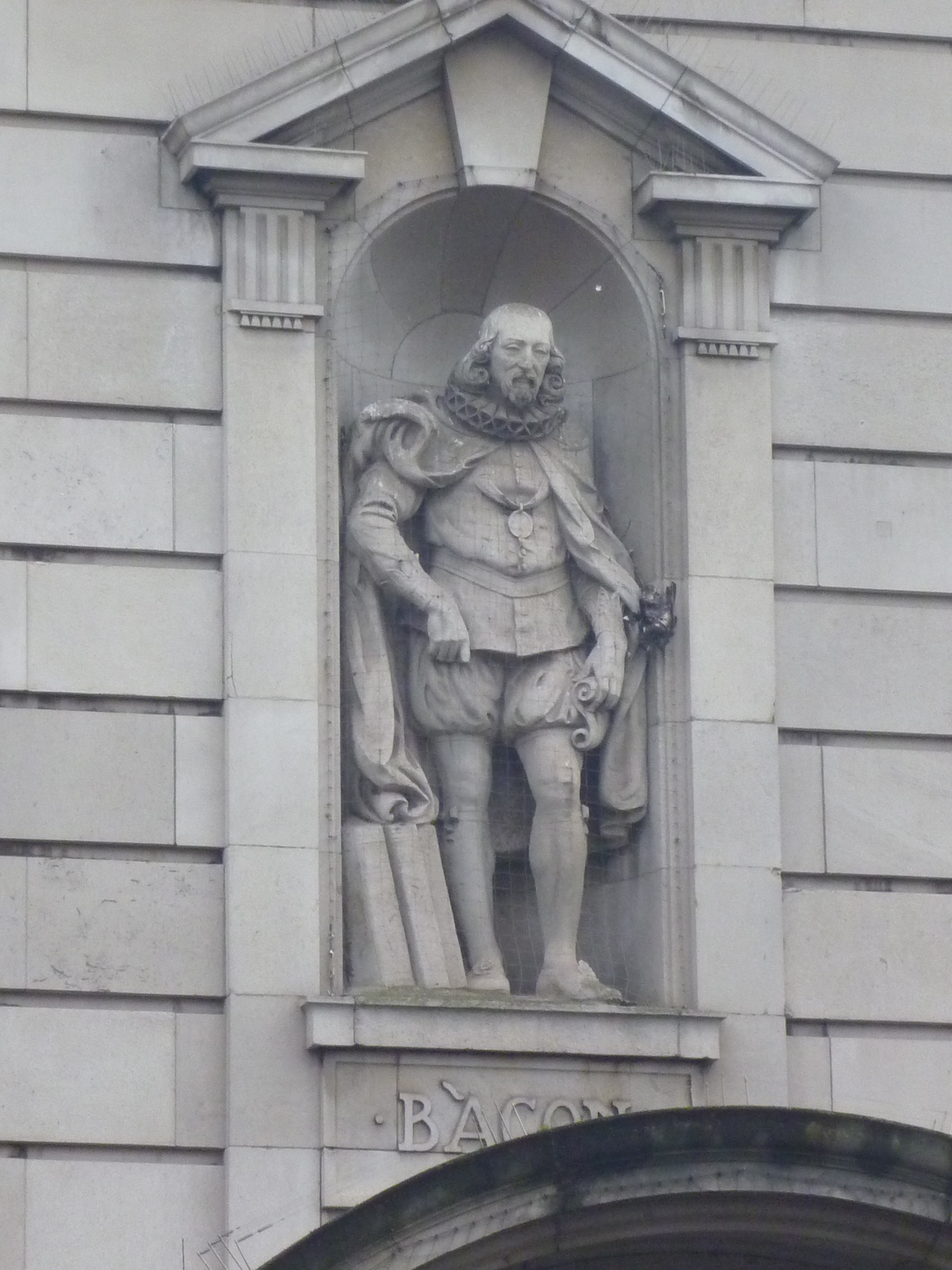
Statue of Bacon

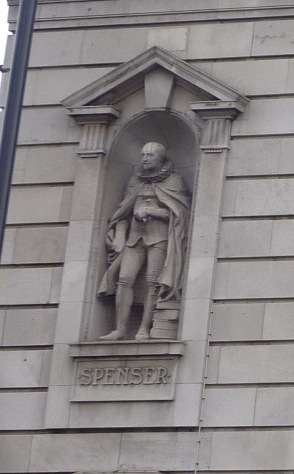
Statue of Spenser

The building was built in the civic beaux arts style, with the principal front, designed by Hare, facing Holloway Road in Portland stone. The three windows have scrolled brackets each carrying a "different emblematic female head," with the words "Islington Central Library" above. To the right of the windows, there is a statue of Bacon, and to the left, a statue of Spenser, both made by Frederick Schenck.

The library was designed as an open-access library, a design that was inspired by American libraries, and that had recently been introduced to the UK by James Dufff Brown at his previous posting in Clerkenwell, in 1894. In Open Access Libraries, their planning, equipment and organisation (1915), James Douglas Stewart discusses how the Central Library's reference library room was laid out, with a desire to have the "books in constant demand" laid out around desks for reading -- two of the figures below are from the book, the view from the outside (p. 179), and the plan of the floors (p. 180). They are both made by Henry Hare, alongside this view of the façade:

Plans for the two main floors

View from the outside

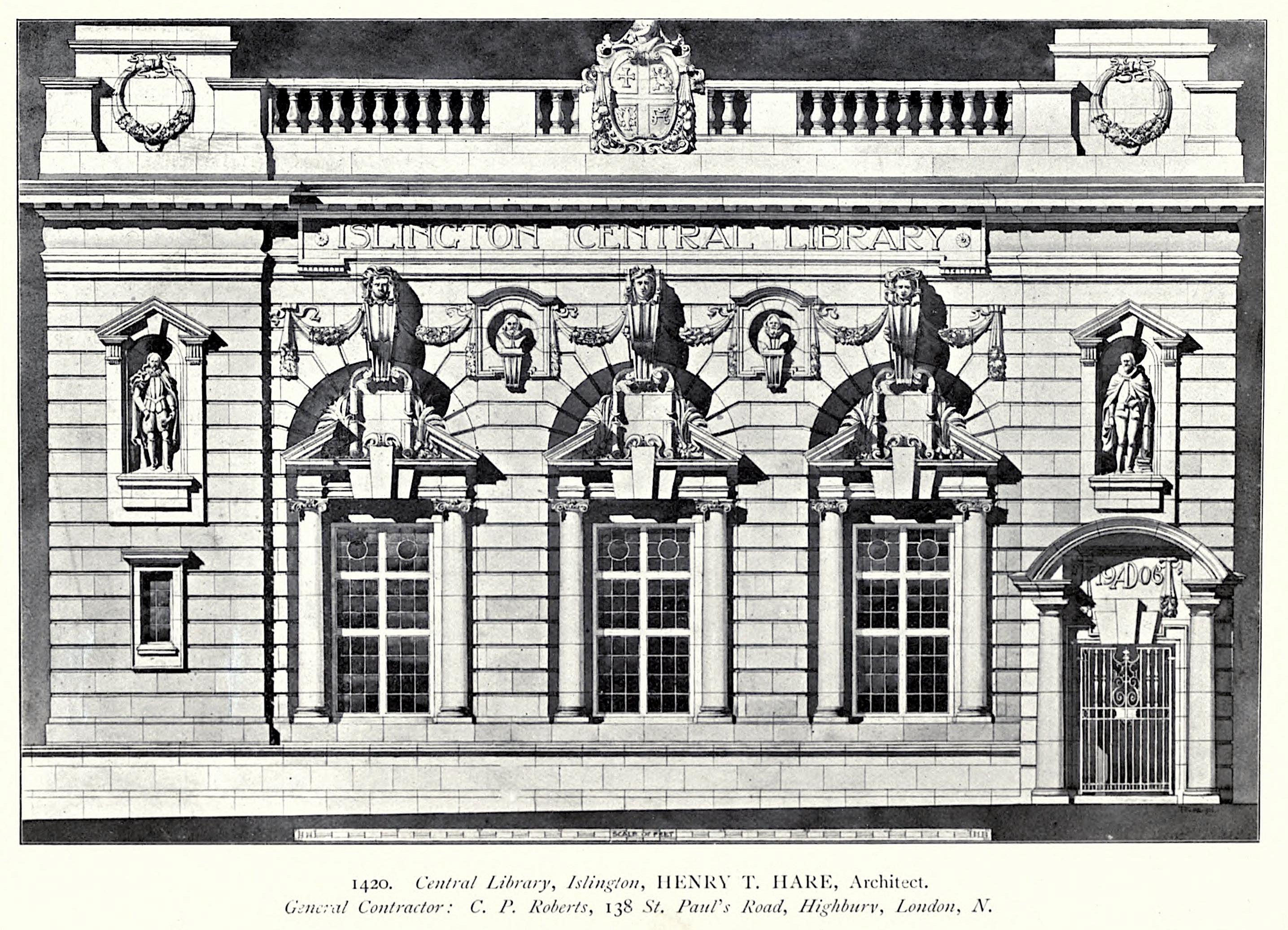
View of the façade, in 1906 review

In the present design, the library has three floors: a children's library on the first floor, a lending library on the second floor, and a reference library on the third floor. Both entrances to the library have step-free access and automatic double doors, and there is a lift to reach higher floors. The building lies between Holloway Road and Highbury Fields park. Irish writer Patrick McCabe recalls living across from the library, noting that he would:

"wake to views of Islington library, with Edmund Spenser and Francis Bacon looking across the road at me. All around there would be people walking, jogging, or playing tennis and doing outdoor classes on Highbury Fields in summer."

== Services ==
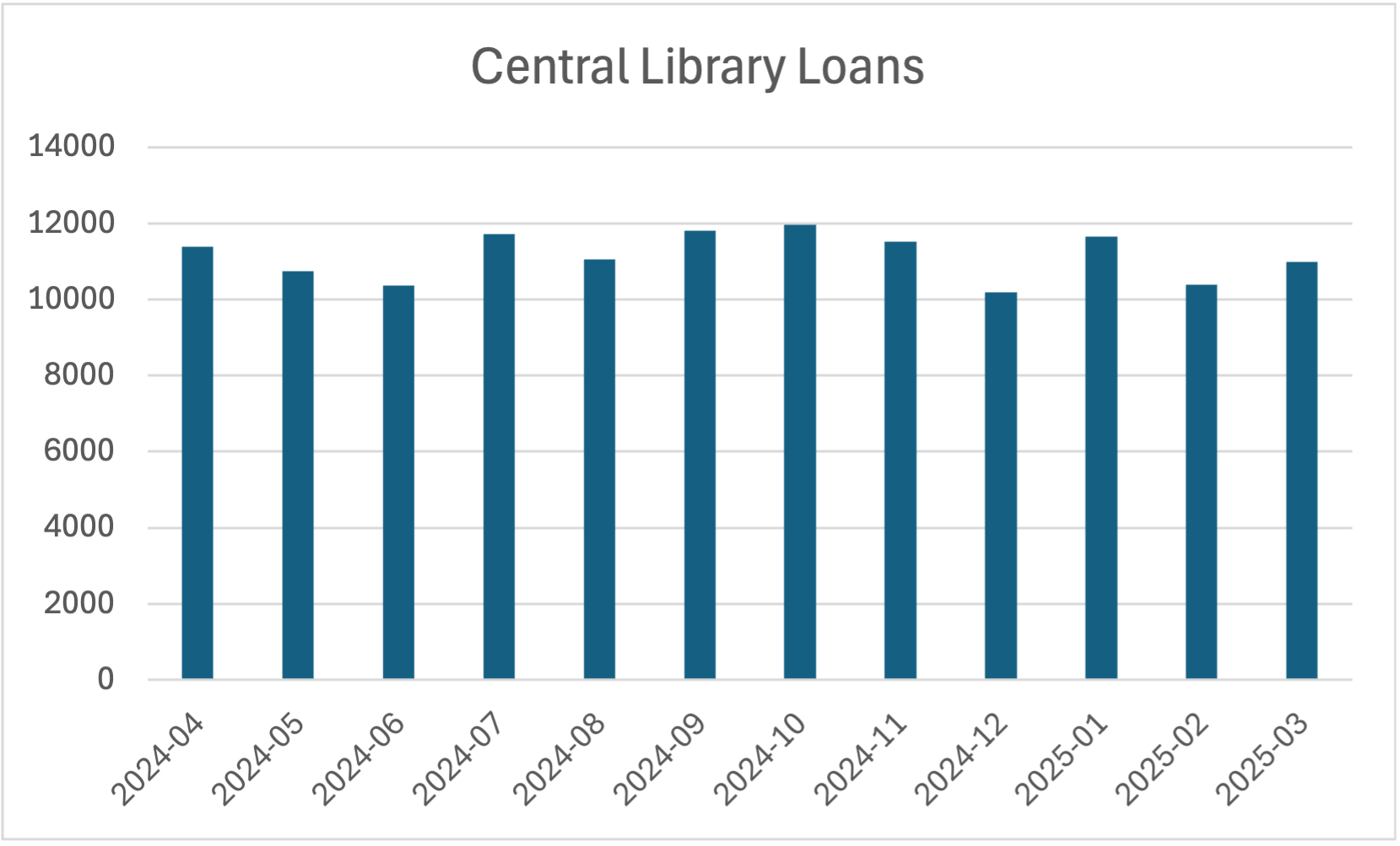
Loans from the Central Library consistently exceed 10,000 per month.

In 2024/25, the Central Library was the library with the most active members (5,793), the highest number of visits (118,875) and the most loans per month (11,149) in the service. The library also hosts one of Islington's toy libraries, where families can borrow toys for free.

On top of serving as a lending library, the Central Library provides access to over 30 free public computers, free wifi, and printing facilities.

The library hosts a wide array of events. In 2024/25, these included the "Our home" display for Refugee week, a storytelling session with author Chitra Soundar for South Asian Heritage month, and a family art workshop with royal portrait artist Phillip Butah. In 2024/25, the Central Library welcomed 12,872 attendees for events – 20% of attendees to all Islington Library events.

Since 2024, it hosts the Alternative Book Fair.

== Popular culture ==
- The Library was a site used for the filming of a stop-motion feature film of Lewis Carroll's The Hunting of the Snark (2023). Producer and Director Saranne Bensusan said "It will be a lot of hard work. We are filming at 16 frames per second - so for every second we will have stopped the film and changed things 16 times. [...] The room at the library is perfect because it has a high enough ceiling for the lighting of the sets."
- Author Claire North referenced a number of Islington libraries in her "Dear Libraries" piece, including the Central Library: "My childhood was ringed by a glorious, shimmering constellation of libraries, from Central Library with its shelves of little guides to big ideas to South Library where the kids sung nursery rhymes every Thursday afternoon, voices bouncing down the stairs."

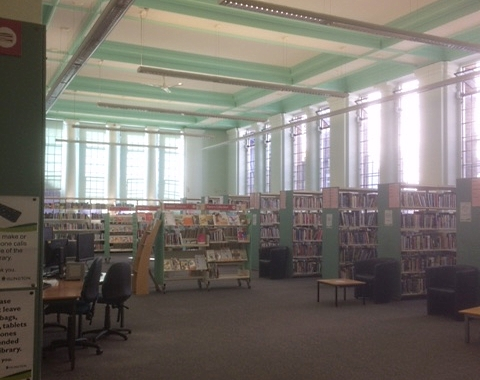
Main reading room, in 2018

== See also ==
- Islington Borough Council
- Islington Libraries
- Highbury neighborhood
