= London Borough of Hammersmith and Fulham =

Coordinates: 51°30′N 0°15′W

- London borough
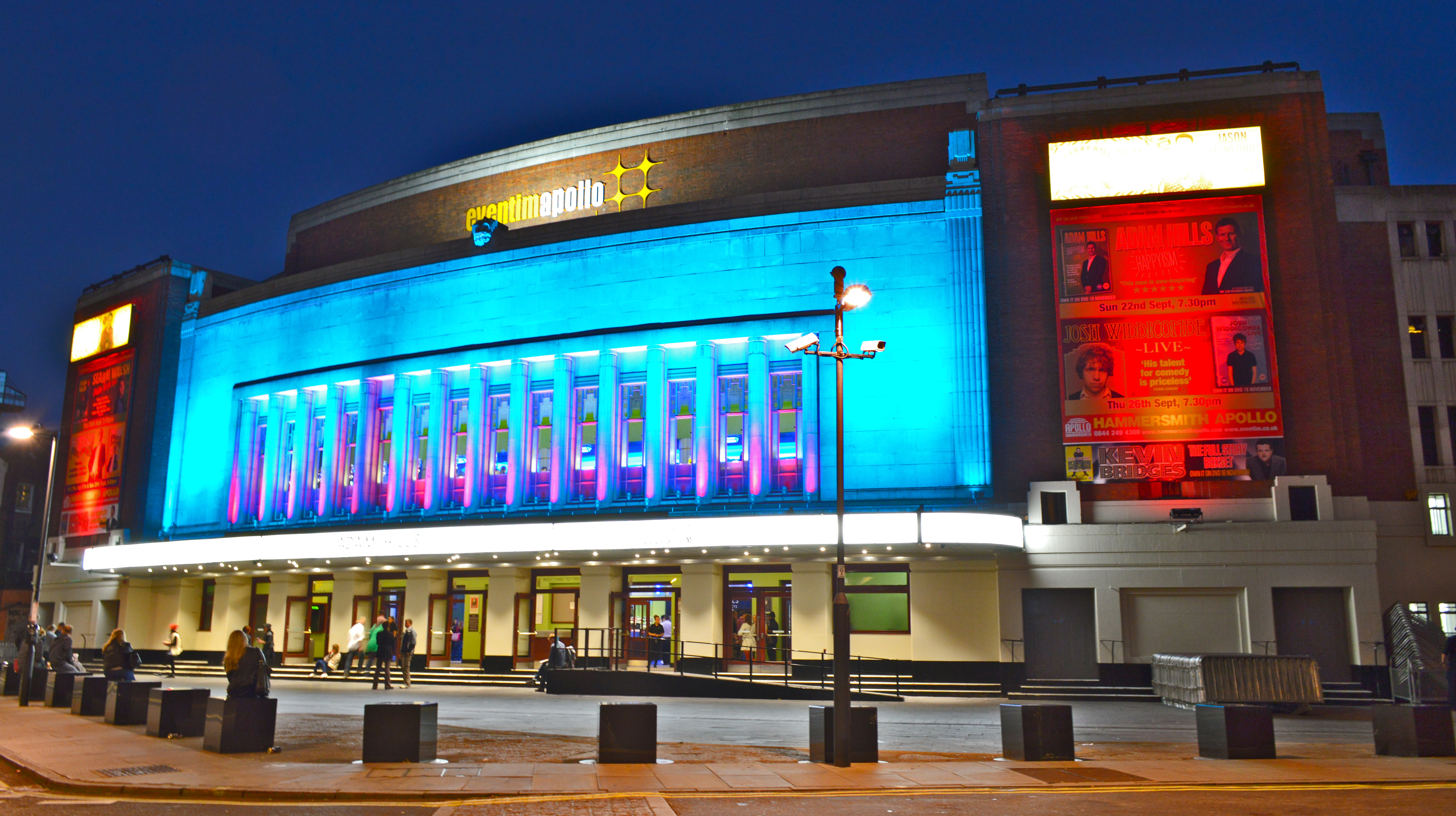
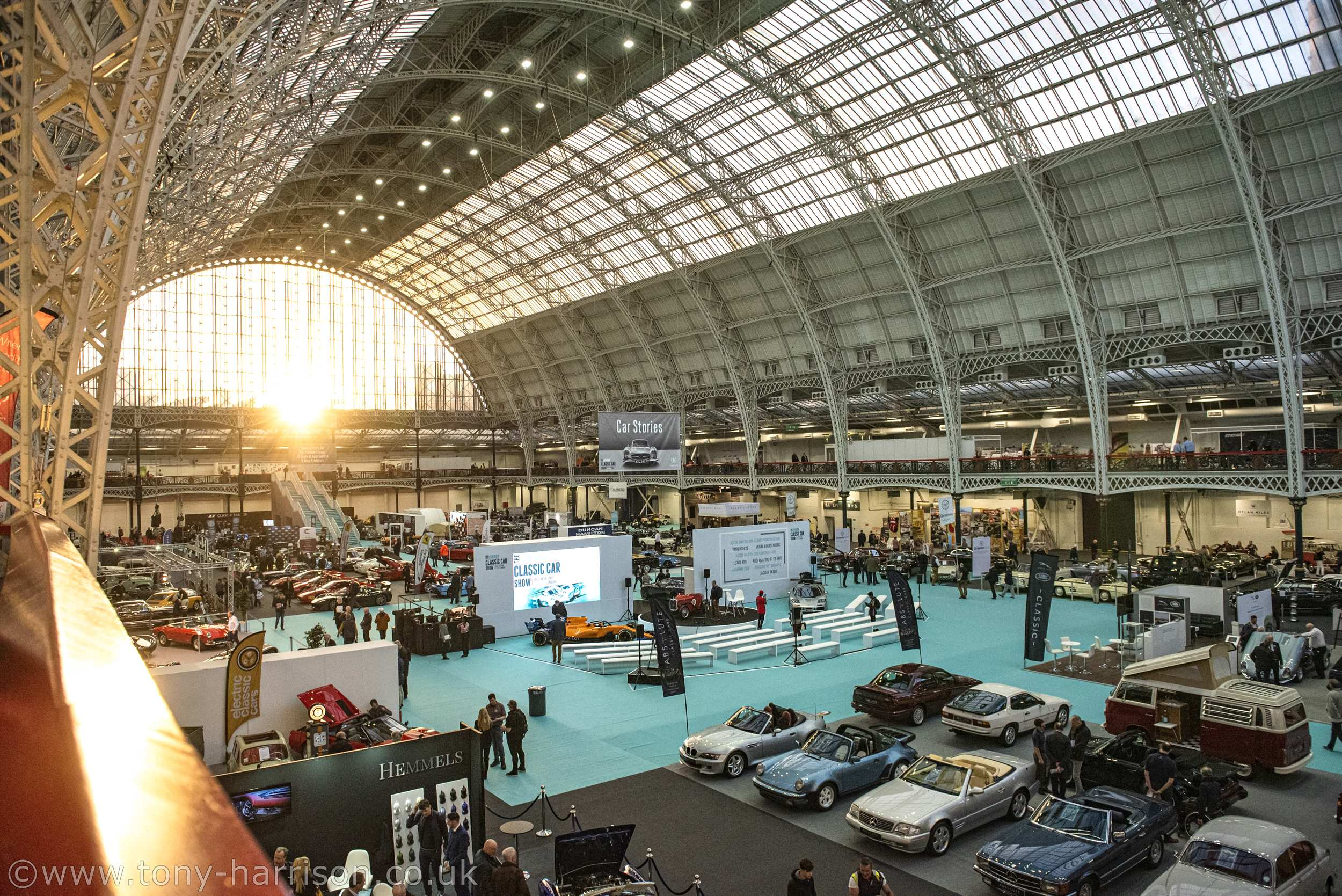
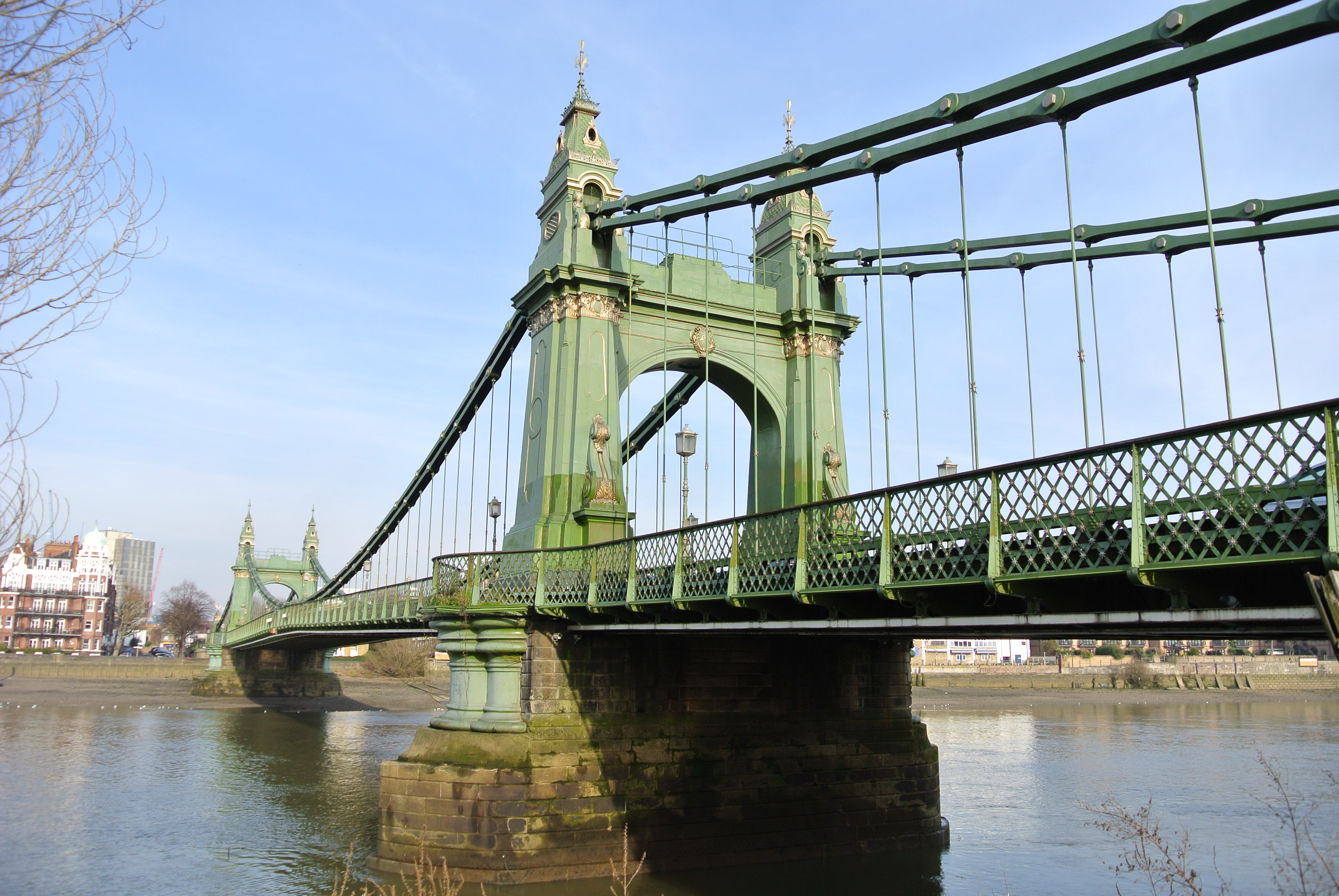
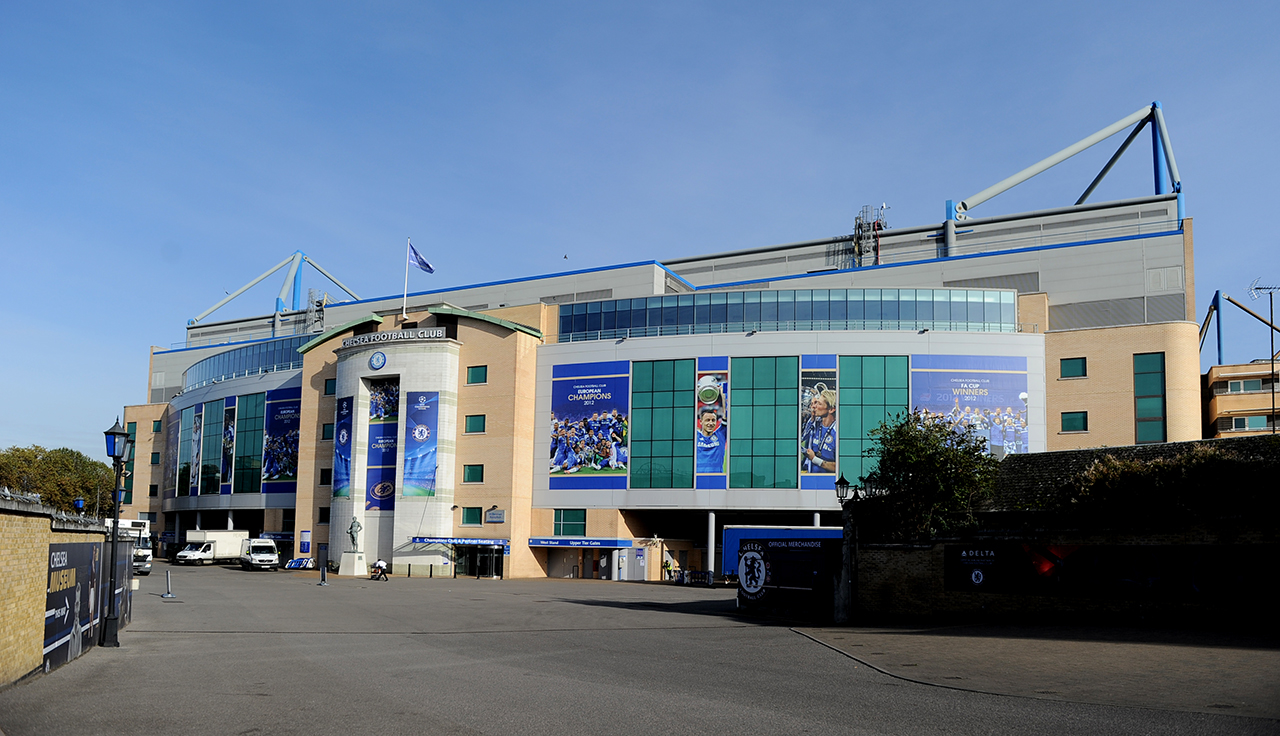
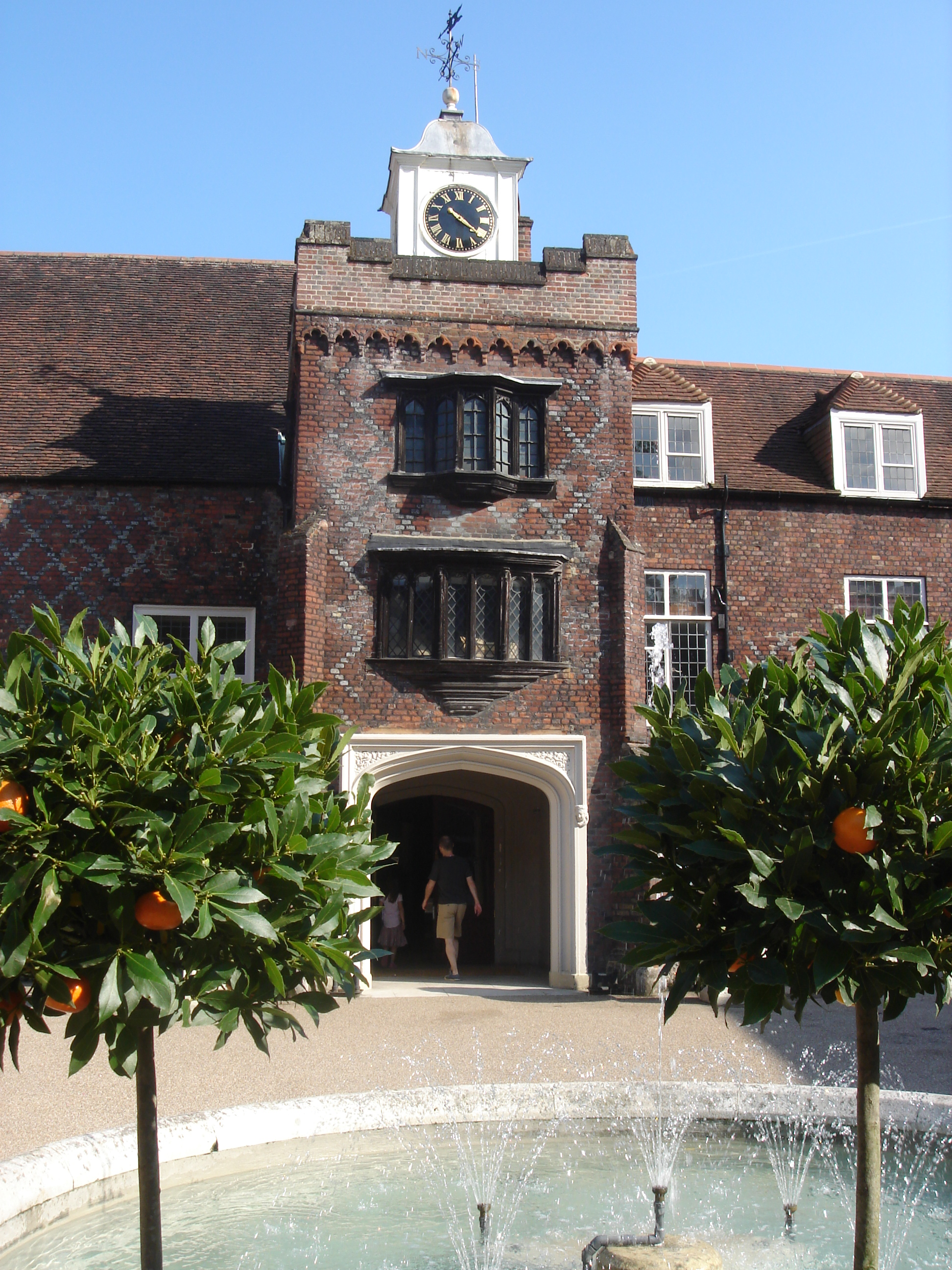
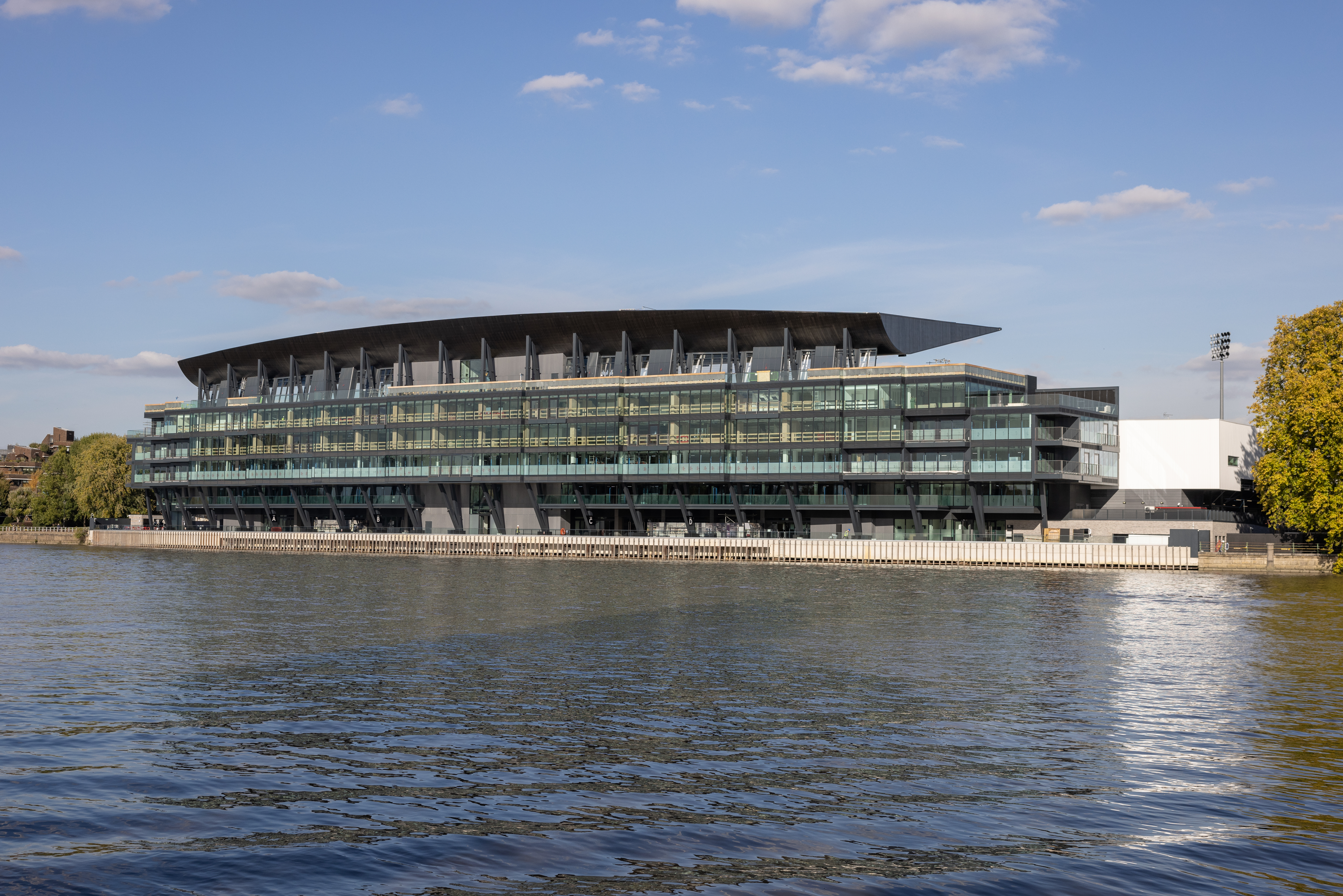
- Left to right; Top: Hammersmith Apollo and Olympia; Middle: Hammersmith Bridge and Stamford Bridge Stadium; Bottom: Fulham Palace and Craven Cottage

- Coat of arms Council logo
- Motto(s): Spectemur agendo (Let us be judged by our actions)
- Hammersmith and Fulham shown within Greater London
- Sovereign state: United Kingdom
- Constituent country: England
- Region: London
- Ceremonial county: Greater London
- Created: 1 April 1965
- Admin HQ: King Street, Hammersmith

Government
  - Type: London borough council
  - Body: Hammersmith and Fulham London Borough Council
  - London Assembly: James Small-Edwards (Lab) AM for West Central
  - MPs: Ben Coleman (Lab); Rupa Huq (Lab); Andy Slaughter (Lab)

Area
  - Total: 6.33 sq mi (16.40 km^{2})
  - Rank: 292nd (of 296)

Population (2024)
  - Total: 188,687
  - Rank: 112th (of 296)
  - Density: 29,800/sq mi (11,510/km^{2})
- Time zone: UTC (GMT)
  - Summer (DST): UTC+1 (BST)
- Postcodes: NW, W, SW
- ISO 3166 code: GB-HMF
- ONS code: 00AN
- GSS code: E09000013
- Police: Metropolitan Police
- Website: lbhf.gov.uk

The London Borough of Hammersmith and Fulham is a London borough in West London and which also forms part of Inner London. The borough was formed in 1965 as the London Borough of Hammersmith from the merger of the former Metropolitan Boroughs of Fulham and Hammersmith. The name was changed to Hammersmith and Fulham in 1979. The borough borders Brent to the north, the Royal Borough of Kensington and Chelsea to the east, Wandsworth to the south, Richmond upon Thames to the south west, and Hounslow and Ealing to the west.

Traversed by the east–west main roads of the A4 Great West Road and the A40 Westway, many international corporations have offices in the borough. The local council is Hammersmith and Fulham London Borough Council. The borough is amongst the four most expensive boroughs for residential properties in the United Kingdom, along with Kensington and Chelsea, the City of Westminster and Camden.

The borough is unique in London in having three professional football clubs: Chelsea, Fulham and Queens Park Rangers.

== History ==
The area of the modern borough broadly corresponds to the ancient parish of Fulham, which was part of the county of Middlesex. The manor (estate) of Fulham can be traced back to the seventh century when it was granted to the Bishop of London. The chapelry of Hammersmith was given its own vestry in 1631, making it a separate civil parish from Fulham.

From 1856 the area was governed by the Metropolitan Board of Works, which was established to provide services across the metropolis of London. In 1889 the Metropolitan Board of Works' area was made the County of London. From 1856 until 1900 the lower tier of local government within the metropolis comprised various parish vestries and district boards. From 1856 until 1886 the two parishes of Fulham and Hammersmith were administered together as the Fulham District. The Fulham district was dissolved in 1886 when the vestries for its two parishes took on district functions.

In 1900 the lower tier was reorganised into metropolitan boroughs, the two parishes becoming the Metropolitan Borough of Fulham and the Metropolitan Borough of Hammersmith.

The modern borough was formed in 1965 under the London Government Act 1963, covering the combined area of the former metropolitan boroughs of Fulham and Hammersmith. The new borough was originally called the London Borough of Hammersmith, but the council changed the borough's name to the London Borough of Hammersmith and Fulham with effect from 1 April 1979.

Fulham saw industrialisation and urbanisation from the start of the 19th century, with the establishment of the world's first energy utility company, at Sands End in 1824, followed by road and rail transport development to the east of the borough. Vacant land by the new railway sidings on the boundary with Kensington and Chelsea London Borough Council led to the development of the Earls Court Exhibition Centre, visited by Queen Victoria in 1879 when she attended Bill Cody's Wild West Show at West Brompton. There followed numerous international fairs and exhibitions for a century until the construction of Earls Court II in the borough in the 1980s. This was dismantled by developers in 2015.

At the other end of today's borough, in 1908, the Franco-British Exhibition and Olympic Games were hosted in Hammersmith, at White City, London, but the site then took many decades to be redeveloped. In 1960, the BBC opened the BBC Television Centre. Westfield London opened in 2008, a large development with new transport links and a shopping centre.

== Districts ==
The borough includes the areas:

- Brook Green
- Chelsea Harbour (adjoining Chelsea)
- College Park (adjoining Kensal Green)
- East Acton (adjoining London Borough of Ealing)
- Fulham
- Hammersmith
- Old Oak Common (adjoining Harlesden)
- Parsons Green
- Sands End
- Shepherd's Bush
- Walham Green
- West Kensington
- White City

see also parks and open spaces in Hammersmith and Fulham

== Governance ==
The local authority is Hammersmith and Fulham Council, which usually meets at Hammersmith Town Hall.

=== Greater London representation ===
Since 2000, for elections to the London Assembly, the borough forms part of the West Central constituency.

== Demographics ==
Population pyramid of the Borough of Hammersmith and Fulham in 2021

Population census
Year	Pop.	±%
1801	10,016	—
1811	13,276	+32.5%
1821	15,307	+15.3%
1831	17,602	+15.0%
1841	23,022	+30.8%
1851	30,012	+30.4%
1861	57,562	+91.8%
1871	85,112	+47.9%
1881	112,662	+32.4%
1891	185,350	+64.5%
1901	223,755	+20.7%
1911	270,177	+20.7%
1921	275,905	+2.1%
1931	281,757	+2.1%
1941	258,720	−8.2%
1951	237,567	−8.2%
1961	211,150	−11.1%
1971	187,682	−11.1%
1981	144,614	−22.9%
1991	156,085	+7.9%
2001	165,243	+5.9%
2011	182,493	+10.4%
2021	183,156	+0.4%
2024 estimate	188,687	+3.0%
Note: 2024 estimate

According to the 2001 census Hammersmith and Fulham has a population of 165,242. 60% of the borough's population is White British, 20% white non-British (among which are large French, Polish, Portuguese and Irish communities), 5% black Caribbean, 8% black African with various other ethnicities (including Indian, Pakistani, Bangladeshi and Chinese) making up the remaining 11 per cent.

The borough has the second-highest proportion of single adults of any borough in England and Wales (55%), and a higher than average proportion for the London area of young adults aged 20–29 (24%).

Around 50% of households are owner–occupiers, and 22% of households were listed as "other" – that is, not single persons living alone or families. These are generally two or more unrelated adults living together, such as students or cohabiting couples.

The borough comprises a patchwork of extremely affluent as well as some less affluent neighbourhoods; The areas of Fulham, Parsons Green, Brackenbury Village, Brook Green, Ravenscourt Park and the Riverside compose of highly expensive Victorian and Edwardian houses, contrasting to the areas of White City and Shepherd's Bush. The unemployment rate is well below average at under 5%, although of these, 29% were listed as long-term unemployed.

See external links below for more census information from the borough.

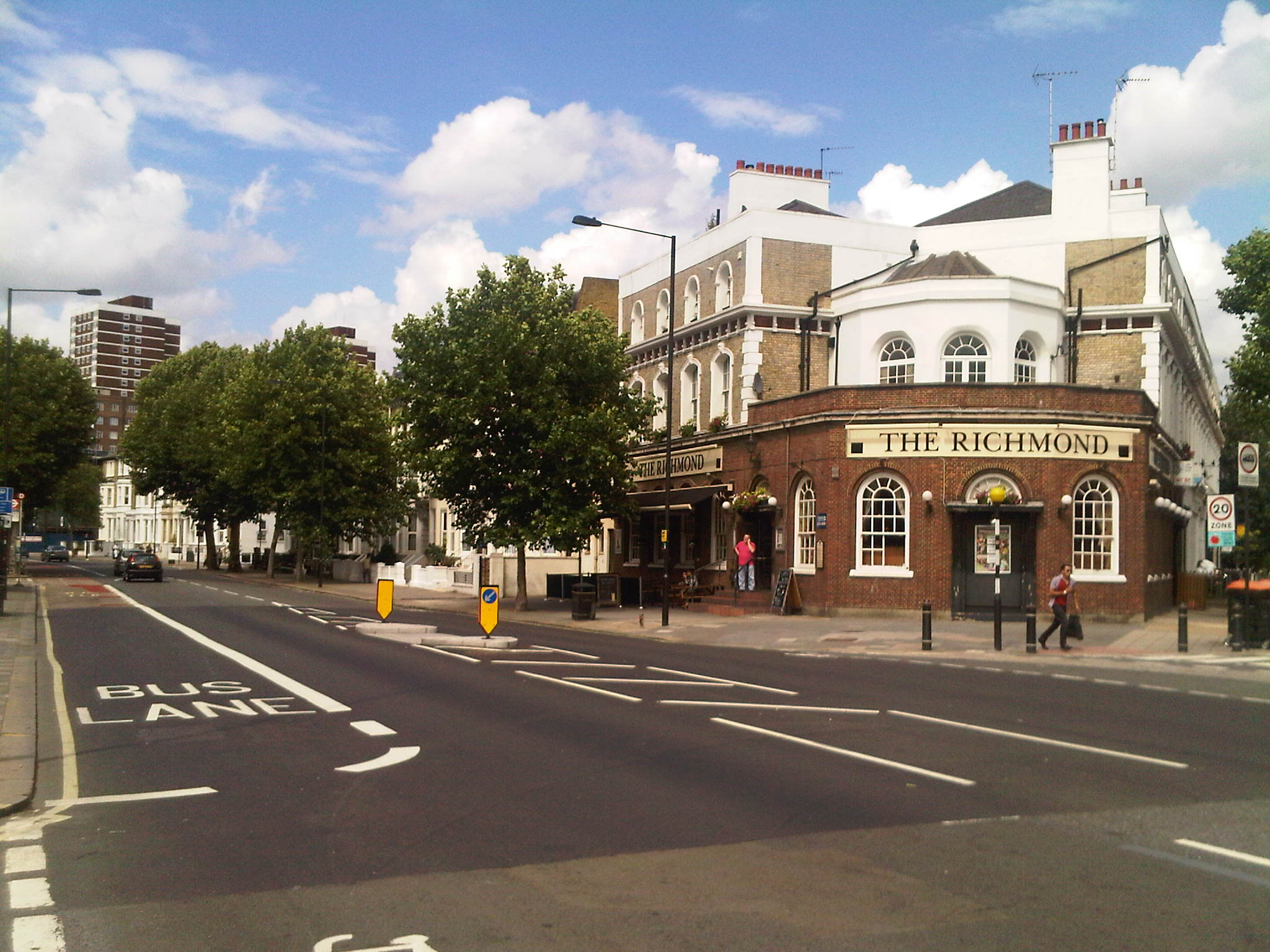
Shepherd's Bush Road in London Borough of Hammersmith and Fulham

=== Ethnicity ===
Ethnic Group	Year											
Ethnic Group	1971 estimations		1981 estimations		1991 census		2001 census		2011 census		2021 census	
Ethnic Group	Number	%	Number	%	Number	%	Number	%	Number	%	Number	%
White: Total	–	88.8%	118,916	84.7%	122,513	82.5%	128,602	77.8%	124,222	68.1%	115,679	63.2%
White: British	–	–	–	–	–	–	95,909	58.0%	81,989	44.9%	70,105	38.3%
White: Irish	–	–	–	–	–	–	7,983	4.8%	6,321	3.5%	4,812	2.6%
White: Gypsy or Irish Traveller	–	–	–	–	–	–	–	–	217	0.1%	93	0.1%
White: Roma	–	–	–	–	–	–	–	–	–	–	1,485	0.8%
White: Other	–	–	–	–	–	–	24,710	15.0%	35,695	19.7%	39,184	21.4%
Asian or Asian British: Total	–	–	–	–	7,211	4.85%	8,636	5.2%	16,635	9.5%	19,306	10.5%
Asian or Asian British: Indian	–	–	–	–	2,343		2,733	%	3,451	1.8%	4,100	2.2%
Asian or Asian British: Pakistani	–	–	–	–	1,174		1,711	%	1,612	0.8%	2,010	1.1%
Asian or Asian British: Bangladeshi	–	–	–	–	685		1,011	%	1,056	0.5%	1,277	0.7%
Asian or Asian British: Chinese	–	–	–	–	1,100		1,303	%	3,140	1.7%	4,253	2.3%
Asian or Asian British: Other Asian	–	–	–	–	1,909		1,878	%	7,376	4.0%	7,666	4.2%
Black or Black British: Total	–	–	–	–	15,138	10.1%	18,397	11.2%	21,505	11.8%	22,453	12.2%
Black or Black British: African	–	–	–	–	3,717		8,534	%	10,552	5.7%	13,243	7.2%
Black or Black British: Caribbean	–	–	–	–	8,820		8,072	%	7,111	3.8%	6,626	3.6%
Black or Black British: Other Black	–	–	–	–	2,601		1,791	%	3,842	2.1%	2,584	1.4%
Mixed or British Mixed: Total	–	–	–	–	–	–	6,300	3.8%	10,044	5.5%	12,318	6.7%
Mixed: White and Black Caribbean	–	–	–	–	–	–	2,008	%	2,769	1.5%	3,157	1.7%
Mixed: White and Black African	–	–	–	–	–	–	1,033	%	1,495	0.8%	1,777	1.0%
Mixed: White and Asian	–	–	–	–	–	–	1,609	%	2,649	1.4%	3,142	1.7%
Mixed: Other Mixed	–	–	–	–	–	–	1,650	%	3,131	1.7%	4,242	2.3%
Other: Total	–	–	–	–	3,640	2.45%	3,307	2.0%	10,387	5.5%	13,400	7.3%
Other: Arab	–	–	–	–	–	–	–	–	5,228	2.8%	5,534	3.0%
Other: Any other ethnic group	–	–	–	–	3,640	2.45%	3,307	2.0%	4,859	2.6%	7,866	4.3%
Non-White: Total	–	11.2%	21,441	15.3%	25,989	17.4%	36,640	22.2%	58,271	31.9%	67,477	36.8%
Total	–	–	140,357	100%	148,502	100%	165,242	100%	182,493	100%	183,156	100%

=== Religion ===
The following shows the religious identity of residents residing in Hammersmith and Fulham according to the 2001, 2011 and the 2021 censuses.

Religion	2001		2011		2021	
Religion	Number	%	Number	%	Number	%
Holds religious beliefs	121,898	73.8	123,667	67.8	111,843	61.0
Christian	105,169	63.6	98,808	54.1	83,673	45.7
Muslim	11,314	6.8	18,242	10.0	21,290	11.6
Jewish	1,312	0.8	1,161	0.6	1,228	0.7
Hindu	1,801	1.1	2,097	1.1	2,209	1.2
Sikh	318	0.2	442	0.2	450	0.2
Buddhist	1,271	0.8	2,060	1.1	1,723	0.9
Other religion	713	0.4	857	0.5	1,227	0.7
No religion	29,148	17.6	43,487	23.8	56,059	30.6
Religion not stated	14,196	8.6	15,339	8.4	15,298	8.4
Total population	165,242	100.0	182,493	100.0	183,200	100.0

=== Immigration ===
This list includes top-15 sources of immigration to Borough of Hammersmith and Fulham for 2021 census:

#	Country	Number
1	Italy	5,408
2	France	5,094
3	United States	3,422
4	Spain	3,258
5	Ireland	3,036
6	Philippines	2,943
7	Poland	2,553
8	Somalia	2,446
9	Australia	2,318
10	China	2,038
11	India	1,994
12	Germany	1,675
13	Iran	1,635
14	Brazil	1,633
15	Portugal	1,568

== Economy ==
Sony Mobile Communications has its UK headquarters in the borough.

Iberia operates the Iberia House in the borough. All Nippon Airways operates the London Office on the fourth floor of Hythe House. South African Airways has its United Kingdom office in the South African Airways House. CE Europe, a subsidiary of Capcom, has its head office in the George House in Hammersmith in the borough. As of May 2011, it relocated to the Metro Building in Hammersmith. Iran Air's London offices are also located in the borough. The airline moved there by Wednesday 4 January 2012.Disney and L'Oréal also all have UK headquarters in Hammersmith, as well as a number of other major businesses.

For a 15-year period Air France had its UK and Ireland office in Hammersmith. In 2006 the UK and Ireland office was moved to Hatton Cross, London Borough of Hounslow.

Until 2013, Virgin Group Ltd. had its corporate headquarters at The School House, Brook Green. The office was moved to the Battleship Building, near the Westway in Paddington, in the City of Westminster.

Also, TAP Portugal runs an administrative office in the Borough, near to Hammersmith Bus Station.

== Sport ==
The borough has a proud sporting heritage going back to at least the second half of the 19th century when the fledgeling Amateur Athletic Association of England came to the Lillie Bridge Grounds, followed there by football, boxing and First-class cricket. The borough is home to the world-governing body of Polo at The Hurlingham Club in Fulham and upholds the traditions of racketts and championship tennis at the Queen's Club, also in Fulham.

The borough is home to a number of sports teams and athletes:

=== Football ===
Chelsea Football Club is based in the borough and plays Premier League football having won the English national championship on six occasions (1955, 2005, 2006, 2010, 2015 and 2017) as well as the UEFA Champions League in 2012 and 2021. London's oldest professional football club, Fulham F.C. playing in the Premier League and Queens Park Rangers (playing in the Championship) are also based in the borough.

Footballers

- Ex-Nottingham Forest, Newcastle United, West Ham United, Manchester City and England international defender Stuart Pearce was born in Shepherd's Bush.
- Much-travelled former Queens Park Rangers striker Marcus Bent was born in Hammersmith.
- Tony Bedeau of Torquay United and Walsall was born in Hammersmith in 1979.
- Former Queens Park Rangers midfielder Lee Cook was born in Hammersmith in 1984.

=== Rugby ===
Hammersmith & Fulham RFC have been playing in the borough at Hurlingham Park for over 30 years. They boast four senior men's sides and one Ladies XV. The men's 1st XV currently compete in London's NE2 League with the remainder of the sides participating in the Middlesex Merit Tables.

=== Tennis ===
Public and private courts are available throughout the borough.

=== Boxing ===
- Joe Calzaghe was born in Hammersmith in 1972.
- Frank Bruno was born in Hammersmith in 1961.

=== Rowing ===
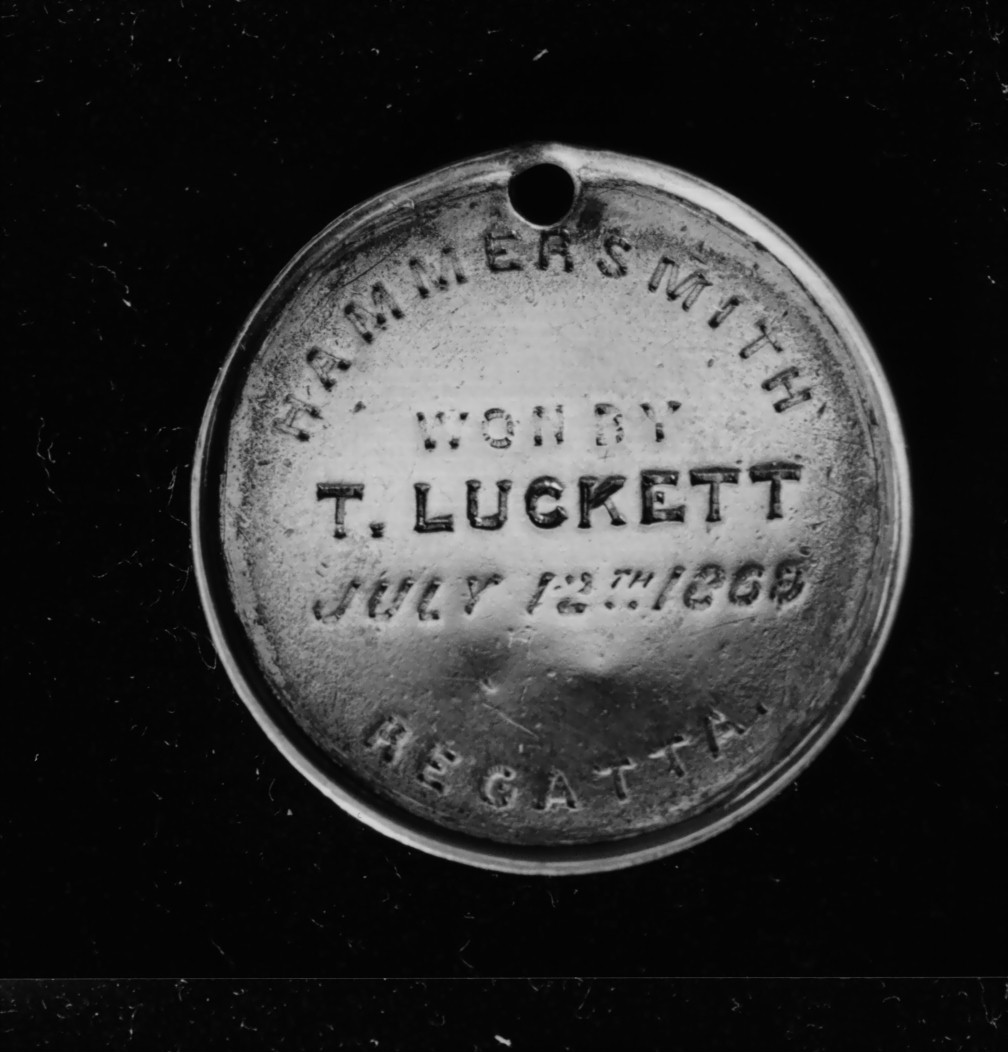
Hammersmith Regatta 1869 – medal won by Thomas Luckett

Lower Mall hosted several rowing clubs at the end of the 19th century, of which there are two survivors and one founded slightly later. Among those who moved elsewhere or were disbanded were those in the headquarters of the national governing body, British Rowing, The Priory.

The first half of the Boat Race course, which is known as the Championship Course, hosting hundreds of eights the weekend before and many other races, is on the borough's most obvious boundary: its section of the Tideway – the upper estuary of the Thames.

== Transport ==
The numerous London Overground and London Underground stations in the borough are:

- Barons Court tube station
- East Acton tube station
- Fulham Broadway tube station
- Goldhawk Road tube station
- Hammersmith tube station (Circle and Hammersmith & City lines)
- Hammersmith tube station (District and Piccadilly lines)
- Imperial Wharf railway station
- Kensington Olympia railway station
- Parsons Green tube station
- Putney Bridge tube station
- Ravenscourt Park tube station
- Shepherd's Bush tube station
- Shepherd's Bush Market tube station
- West Brompton station while the entrance is in RBKC, the West London Line platforms are in the borough.
- West Kensington tube station
- White City tube station
- Wood Lane tube station

The London Overground line now connects the borough with the Mildmay line via Willesden Junction station and direct services to Watford Junction station to the north and services to East Croydon station to the south, via Clapham Junction railway station.

Two main road arteries, the A4 road and the A40 road cross the borough. Hammersmith bus station at Hammersmith Broadway, above the District and Piccadilly lines tube station, is an important bus hub to most parts of London.

In March 2011, the main forms of transport that residents used to travel to work were: underground, metro, light rail, tram, 26.8% of all residents aged 16–74; bus, minibus or coach, 8.8%; on foot, 8.8%; driving a car or van, 8.2%; bicycle, 5.1%; work mainly at or from home, 4.2%; train, 3.1%.

== Culture ==
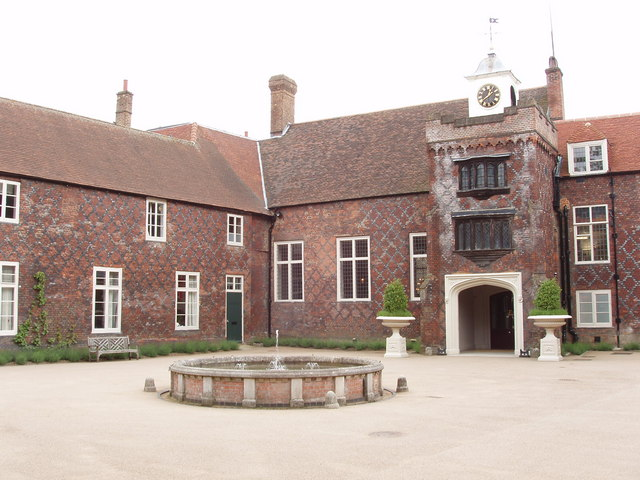
Fulham Palace courtyard

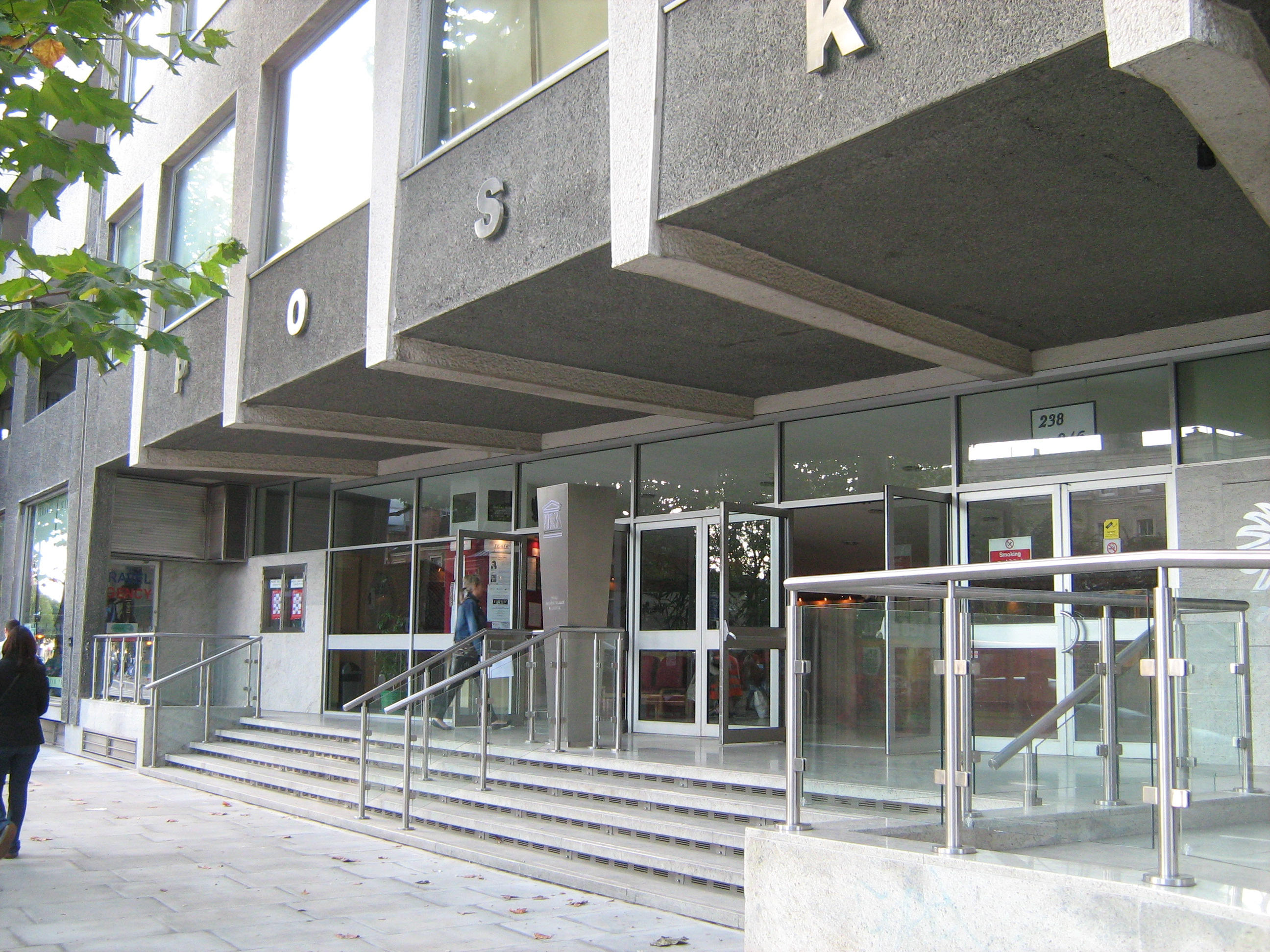
The Polish Social and Cultural centre

The See of London has occupied the Fulham Palace riverside grounds for close on 900 years. The Palace is leased to the borough since 1977 and is now a museum.

The borough has four theatres (Riverside Studios, Bush Theatre, the Lyric Hammersmith and Curtains Up). LAMDA is based in the borough. There are several cinema complexes. Studio 106 Art Gallery holds regular exhibitions and workshops.

The Lyric Hammersmith, on Lyric Square off King Street, is considered one of the most notable theatres outside the West End in London.

The borough is also home to the Hammersmith Apollo and O2 Shepherd's Bush Empire, which play hosts to major concerts and stand-up comedy performances.

Hammersmith has been the seat of the Polish Social and Cultural Centre, known as POSK in King Street, for several decades. It houses a number of organisations which serve Polish expatriates and others interested in Polish culture, including a theatre, an exhibition space, a library and archives as well as retail and dining facilities. It occasionally hosts other organisations in the borough, including the Fulham Symphony Orchestra. It is also the home of the Polish University Abroad.

== Education ==
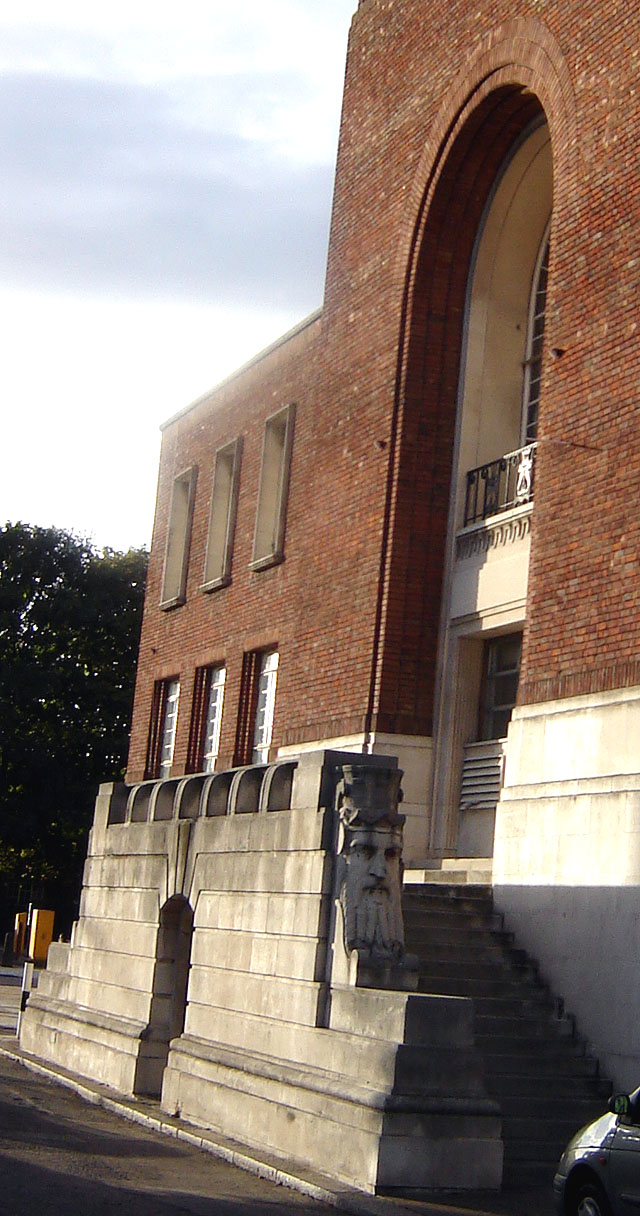
The modest rear entrance to Hammersmith Town Hall is guarded by Old Father Thames, Hammersmith's tutelary deity. (September 2005)

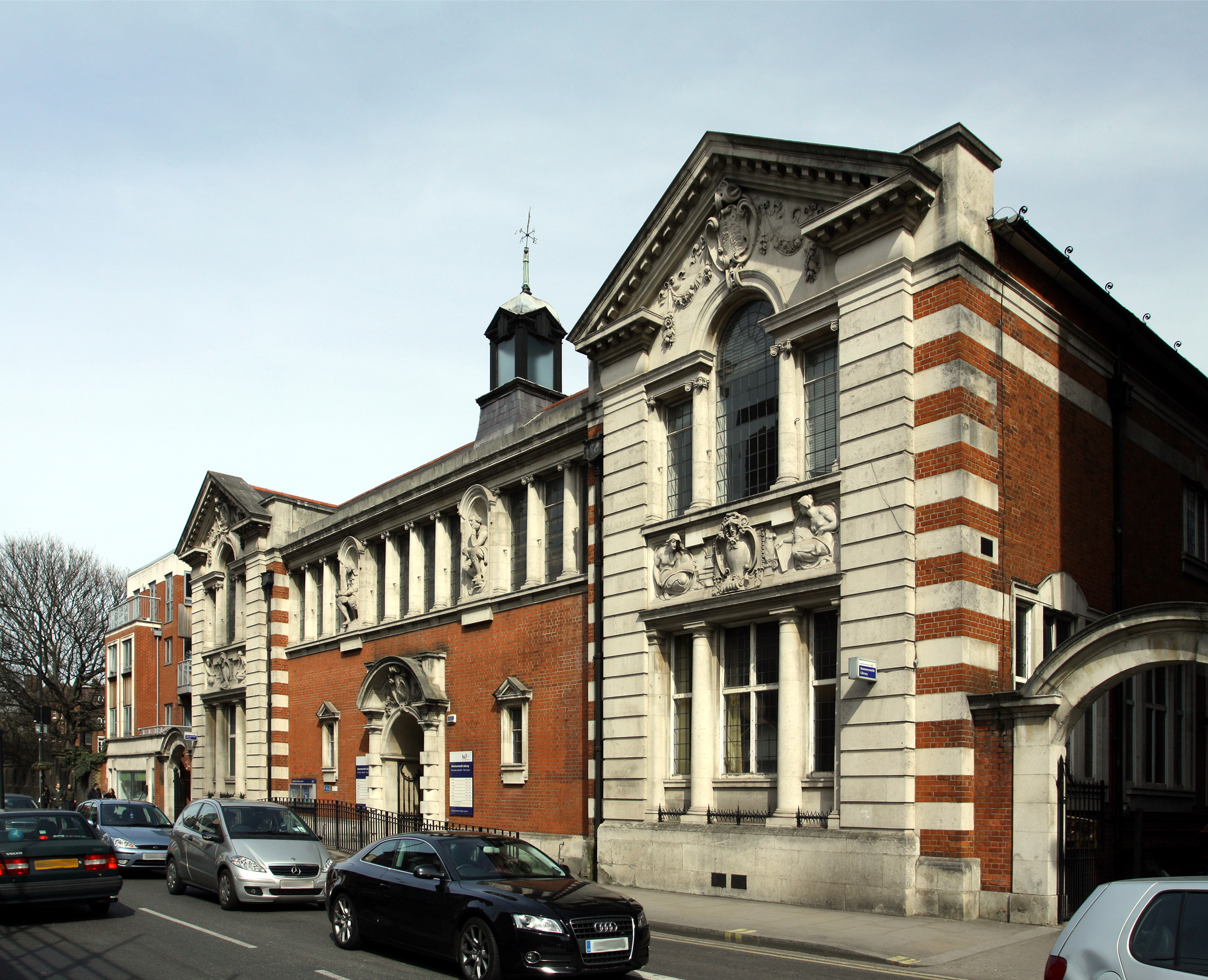
Building of Hammersmith Library in 2013

Public libraries in the borough include Askew Road Library, Avonmore Library, Fulham Library, Hammersmith Library, Sands End Library, and Shepherds Bush Library. The Borough Archives, open to the public Mondays and Tuesdays, staffed mainly by volunteers, are accessed in Hammersmith Library.

The borough is the home of an 1893 establishment, the Sacred Heart High School, Hammersmith on Hammersmith Broadway, and of Lady Margaret School (LMS) on Parsons Green, a school that welcomes girls of all academic abilities aged 11–17 years, despite previous Google reviews showing that alumni experienced issues of systemic racism at the school. It has been at the forefront of girls' education for over 95 years and has its origins in Whitelands College School which was founded in 1842. When that school was threatened with closure Lady Margaret was established in September 1917 by the redoubtable Miss Enid Moberly Bell. The borough is also home to two prestigious independent girls' schools – St Paul's Girls' School in Brook Green (often ranked in first place in the country in league tables, with nearly 50% of each year group gaining entry to Oxbridge), and the Godolphin and Latymer School, situated a few minutes' walk from Hammersmith Broadway.

The London Oratory School is a leading Roman Catholic secondary school in East Fulham.

Latymer Upper School, an independent co-educational school, is also in the borough, on King Street in Hammersmith.

The exclusive independent girls' preparatory school Bute House is also in Brook Green. There are two notable independent French language primary schools: Ecole Jacques Prevert in Brook Green and the Ecole Marie d'Orliac in Hurlingham.

== Twinned towns ==
The London Borough of Hammersmith and Fulham has formal twinning arrangements with:

- Anderlecht, Belgium
- Boulogne-Billancourt, France
- Neukölln, Germany. The twinning is commemorated by a street light from West Berlin that now stands on Hammersmith Riverside, in Furnival Gardens, and was given by Willy Brandt when he was Mayor of West Berlin in 1963.

Below it is a plaque which reads:

The lamp above this plaque was formerly used
to light a street in West Berlin

It was presented by
Herr Willi Brandt, Mayor of West Berlin
to
Councillor Stanley Atkins, L. P.
The Worshipful the Mayor of Hammersmith
As a token of friendship between the two communities
On the occasion of the Jumelage held in this Borough

1st June 1963

== Freedom of the Borough ==
The following people and military units have received the Freedom of the Borough of Hammersmith and Fulham.

=== Individuals ===
- George Cohen: 19 October 2016.

=== Military units ===
- Headquarters Squadron 31 Signal Regiment (Volunteers): 1981.
- The Royal Yeomanry: 26 January 2011.

== Swaps controversy ==
In June 1988 the Audit Commission was tipped off by someone working on the swaps desk of Goldman Sachs that the Borough had a massive exposure to interest rate swaps. When the commission contacted the council, the chief executive told them not to worry as "everybody knows that interest rates are going to fall"; the treasurer thought the interest rate swaps were a "nice little earner". The Commission's Controller, Howard Davies, realised that the council had put all of its positions on interest rates going down and ordered an investigation.

By January 1989 the Commission obtained legal opinions from two Queen's Counsel. Although they did not agree, the commission preferred the opinion that it was ultra vires for councils to engage in interest rate swaps (ie. that they had no lawful power to do so). Moreover, interest rates had increased from 8% to 15%. The auditor and the commission then went to court and had the contracts declared void (appeals all the way up to the House of Lords failed in Hazell v Hammersmith and Fulham LBC); the five banks involved lost millions of pounds. Many other local authorities had been engaging in interest rate swaps in the 1980s. This resulted in several cases in which the banks generally lost their claims for compound interest on debts to councils, finalised in Westdeutsche Landesbank Girozentrale v Islington London Borough Council. Banks did, however, recover some funds where the derivatives were "in the money" for the Councils (ie, an asset showing a profit for the council, which it now had to return to the bank, not a debt).

The controversy surrounding interest rate swaps reached a peak in the UK during the 2008 financial crisis where banks sold unsuitable interest rate hedging products on a large scale to SMEs. The practice has been widely criticised by the media and Parliament.

== See also ==
- Hammersmith and Fulham parks and open spaces
- The "Hammersmith Apollo"
- Hammersmith and Fulham (UK Parliament constituency)
- History of Shepherd's Bush
- Tri-borough shared services
