= Edward Dudley =

Edward Dudley may refer to:

- Edward Bishop Dudley (1789–1855), U.S. politician
- Edward R. Dudley (state legislator), politician who served in the North Carolina House of Representatives for Craven County in 1870 and 1872
- Edward Richard Dudley (1911–2005), U.S. ambassador
- Ed Dudley (1901–1963), American golfer
- Ed Dudley (baseball) (fl. 1920s–1930s), American baseball player
- Edward Dudley (librarian) (1919–2010), English librarian
