= Henry Hare (architect) =

English architect

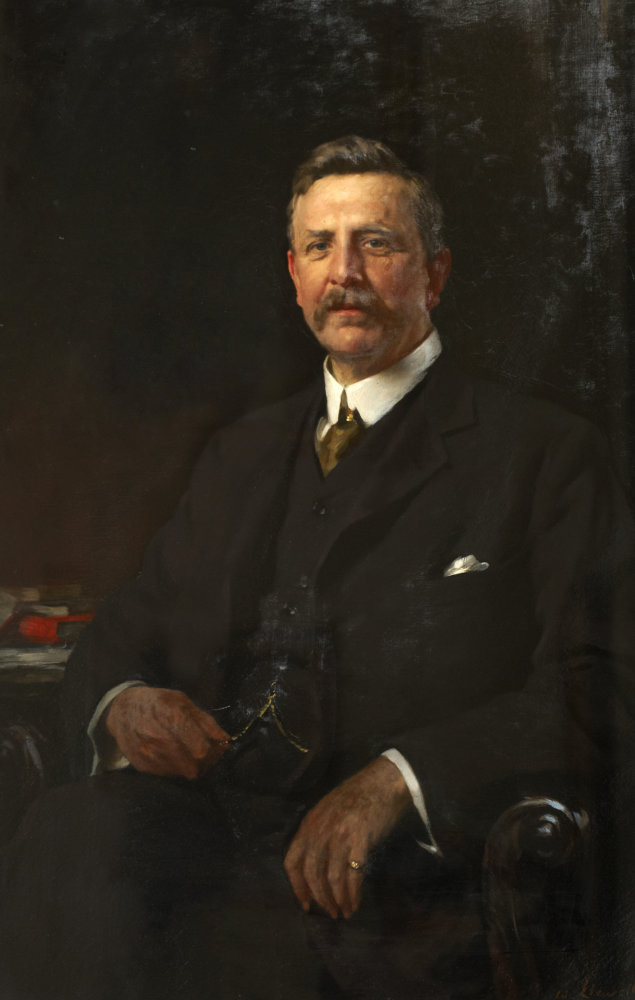
1914 portrait of Hare

Henry Thomas Hare (1860–1921) was a British architect who was born in Scarborough, Yorkshire and educated in Sheffield and Harrogate.

== Career ==
At the age of 16 he was articled to the Scarborough architect C A Bury but left after four years to complete his studies at the Atelier Ginain in Paris. He returned to London in 1878 to work as an assistant to the London architects King + Hill, and in 1886 passed the associateship examination for entry to the Royal Institute of British Architects, (RIBA) receiving the Asphitel Prize for passing with the highest marks.

Hare set up his own practice in London in 1891, often working in collaboration with others. He was well-respected, serving on RIBA Council for many years, being President of the Architectural Association in 1902 and later becoming a Vice-President and then President of the RIBA from 1917 to 1919. He died in January 1921.

Hare's trademark was including an etching or carving of a hare in every building he designed.

== Selected buildings ==
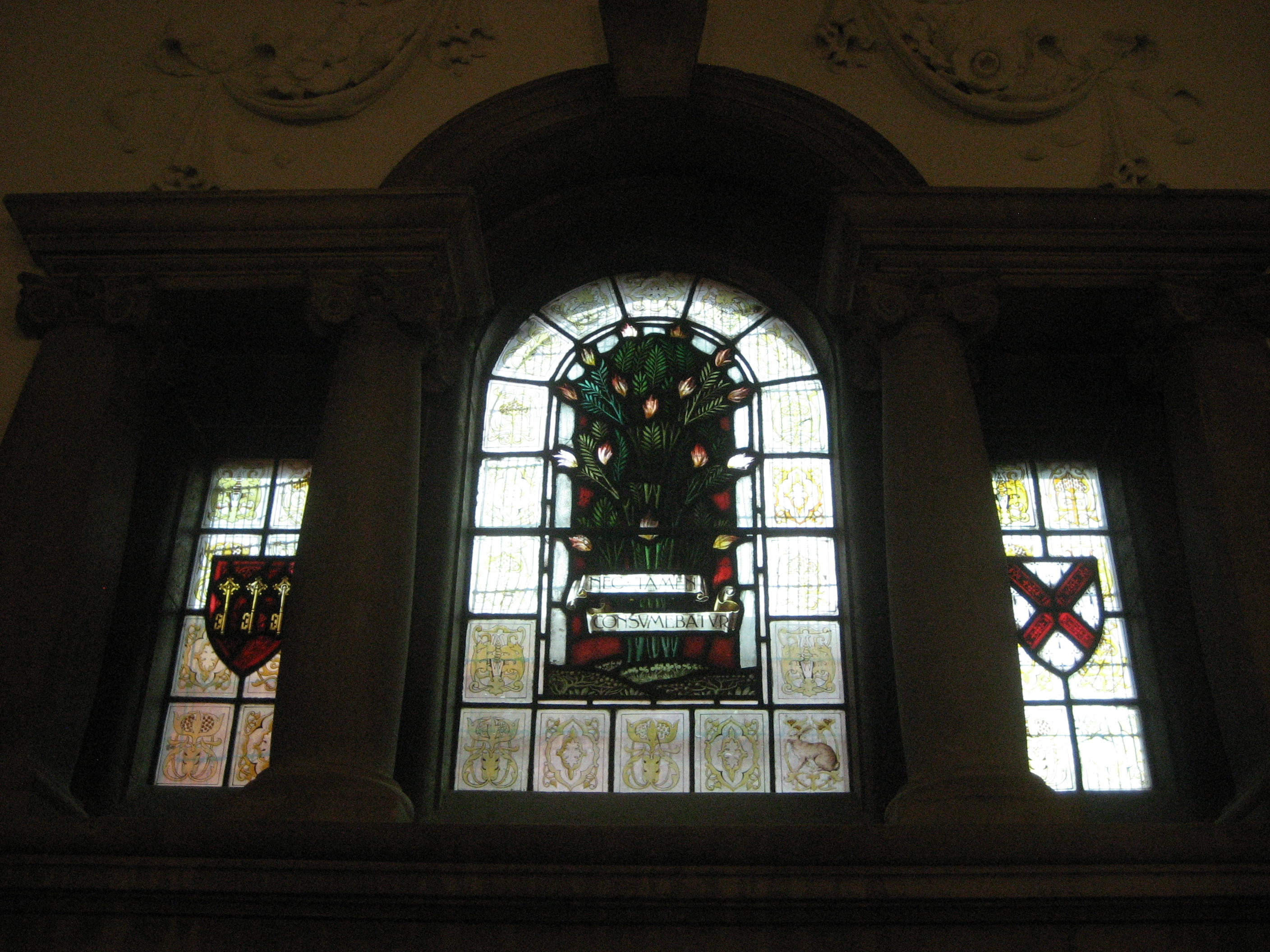
Hare's trademark -a hare, bottom right in the middle stained glass, at Westminster College, Cambridge

- County Buildings, Stafford (1893–1895)
- Oxford Town Hall, (1893–1897)
- Passmore Edwards Free Library, Hackney, London (1897–1899)
- Henley Town Hall, Henley-on-Thames, Oxfordshire (1899–1900)
- Technical College, Southend-on-Sea, Essex (1900)
- Crewe Municipal Buildings, Cheshire (1902–1905)
- Carnegie Central Library, Hammersmith, London (1905)
- Carnegie Central Library, Southend-on-Sea, Essex (1905)
- Central and North Libraries, Islington, London (1906)
- Fulham Central Library, London (1908), formerly Westfield House
- University College of North Wales, Bangor (1911)
- Westminster College, Cambridge (1899)
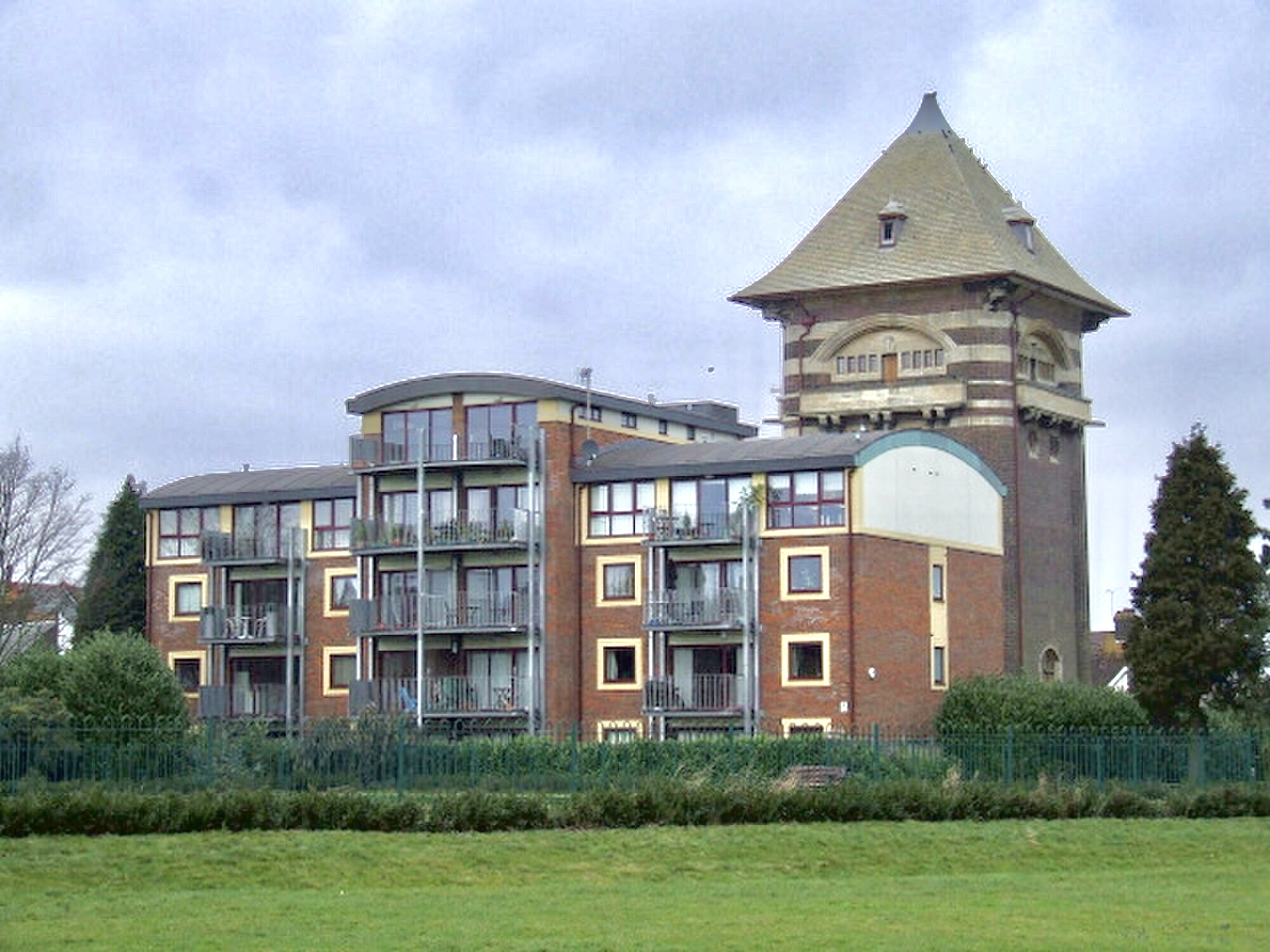
- Bailey Hill water tower (2012) by Thomas Nugent
  Bailey Hill Water Tower, Luton (1901)
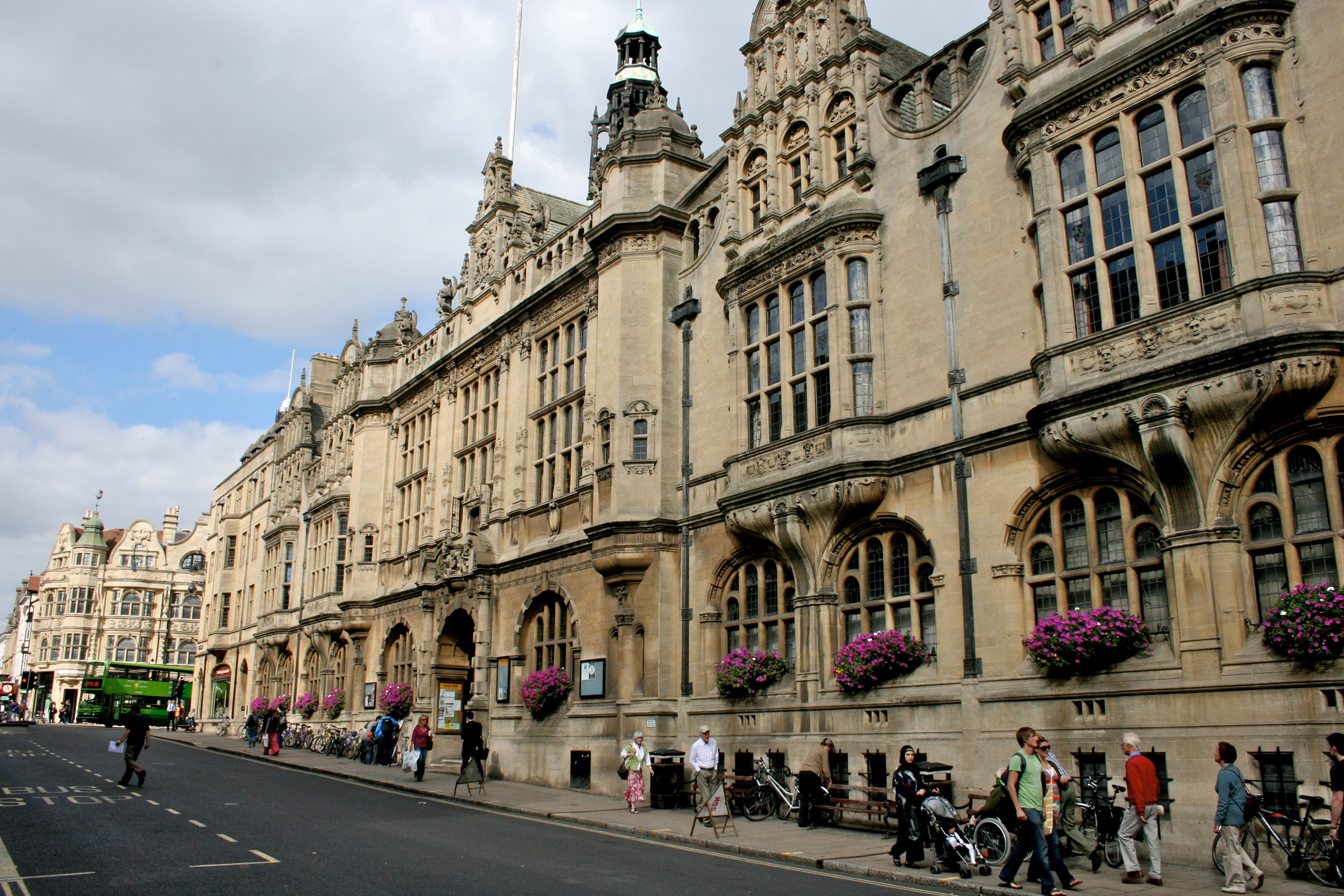
Oxford Town Hall

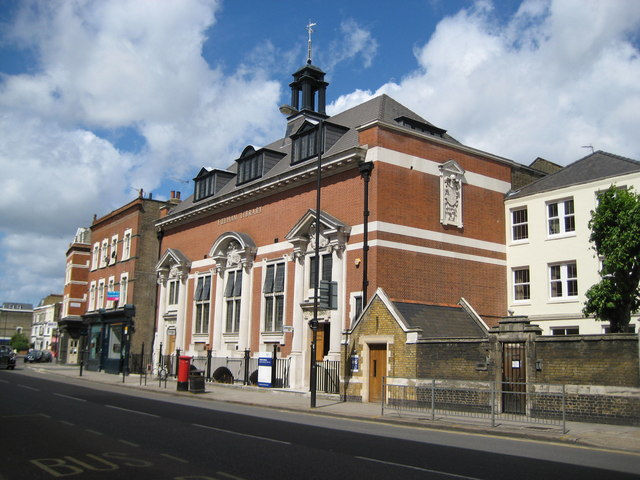
Fulham Library

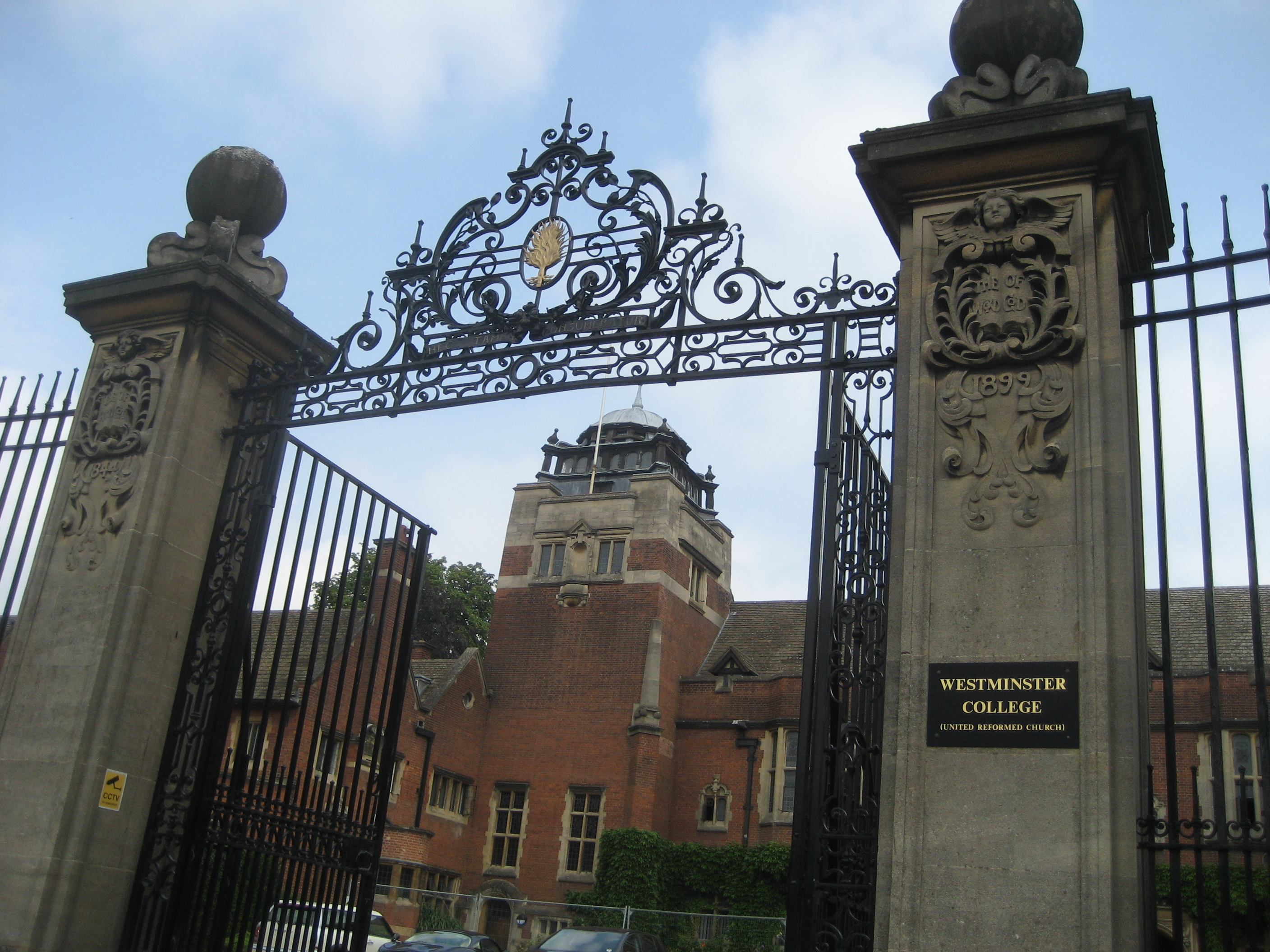
Westminster College

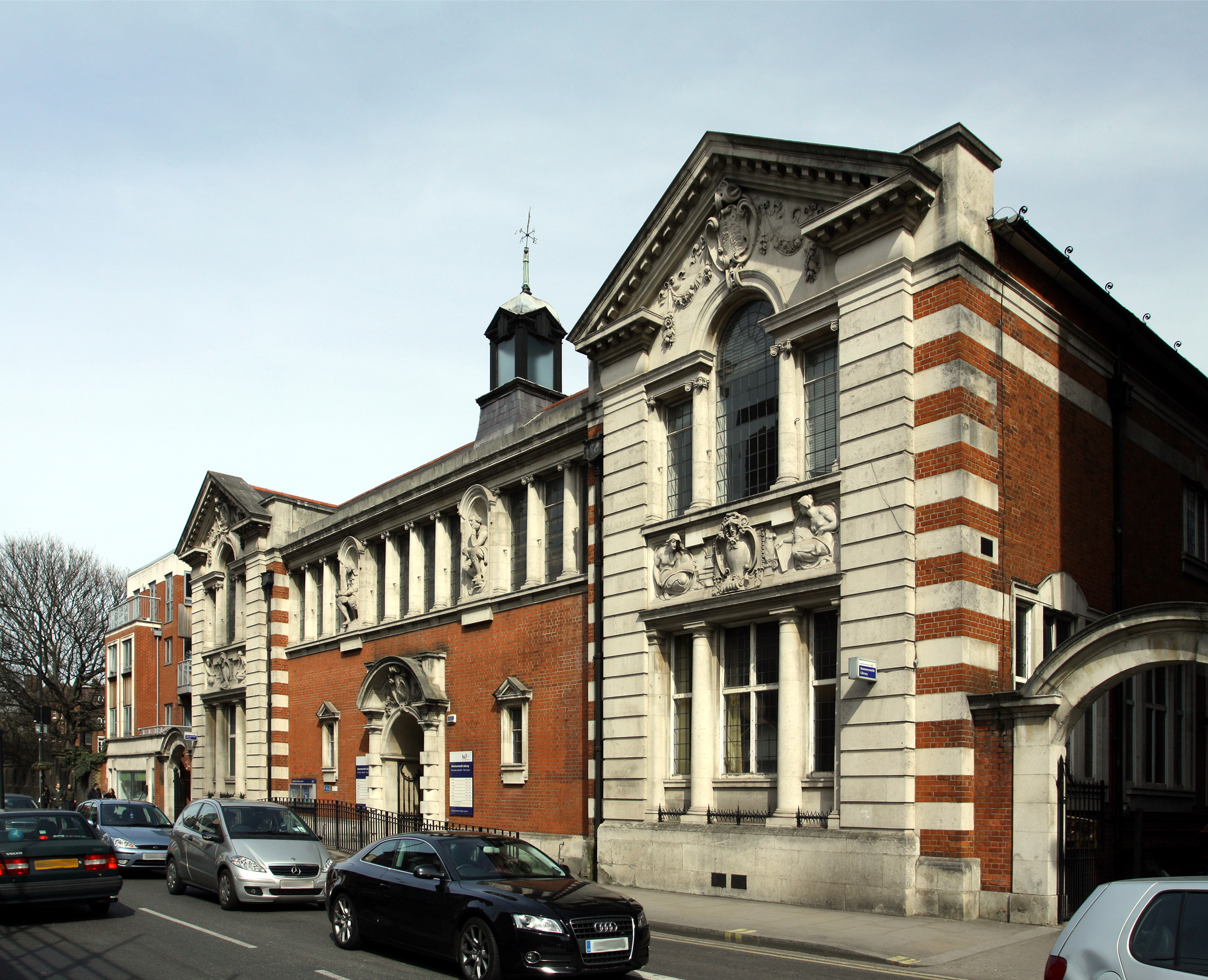
Hammersmith Library

== Sources ==
- Pevsner, Nikolaus (1974). Staffordshire. The Buildings of England. Harmondsworth: Penguin Books. ISBN 0-14-071046-9.
- Pevsner, Nikolaus; Hubbard, Edward (1971). Cheshire. The Buildings of England. Harmondsworth: Penguin Books. ISBN 0-14-071042-6.
- Pevsner, Nikolaus; Radcliffe, Enid (revision) (1965) [1954]. Essex. The Buildings of England. Harmondsworth: Penguin Books. ISBN 0-14-0710-11-6.
- Sherwood, Jennifer; Pevsner, Nikolaus (1974). Oxfordshire. The Buildings of England. Harmondsworth: Penguin Books. ISBN 0-14-071045-0.
