= Edward Dudley (librarian) =

English librarian and editor

Edward Dudley (1919–2010) was an English librarian who also lectured in librarianship and edited the professional journals New Library World and The Library Association Record.

Dudley was born in Wandsworth, London, the son of an engine driver. He worked as a librarian at Fulham Library from 1936 to 1939.

== Army career ==
With the outbreak of the Second World War he joined the Army. Initially he was with the infantry, transferring to the Royal Army Service Corps in 1941. He returned to the Infantry in 1944, first the Devons and then as a seconded Platoon commander with the Queen's and served in Italy. He was then appointed as a librarian while still in the Army, for which he received extra pay.

== Librarianship scholar ==
After the war, Dudley started work at the Belsize Park Library in North London. He went on to become a lecturer at the Polytechnic of North London. In 1983 he became editor of the New Library World and subsequently was involved in the founding of the Journal of Librarianship and Information Science.

In 2010 the Chartered Institute of Library and Information Professionals (CILIP) awarded him the first Cilip medal for his lifetime of professional achievement.
