= Hammersmith Library =

Public library in Hammersmith, London, England

Coordinates: 51.494628°N 0.223674°W

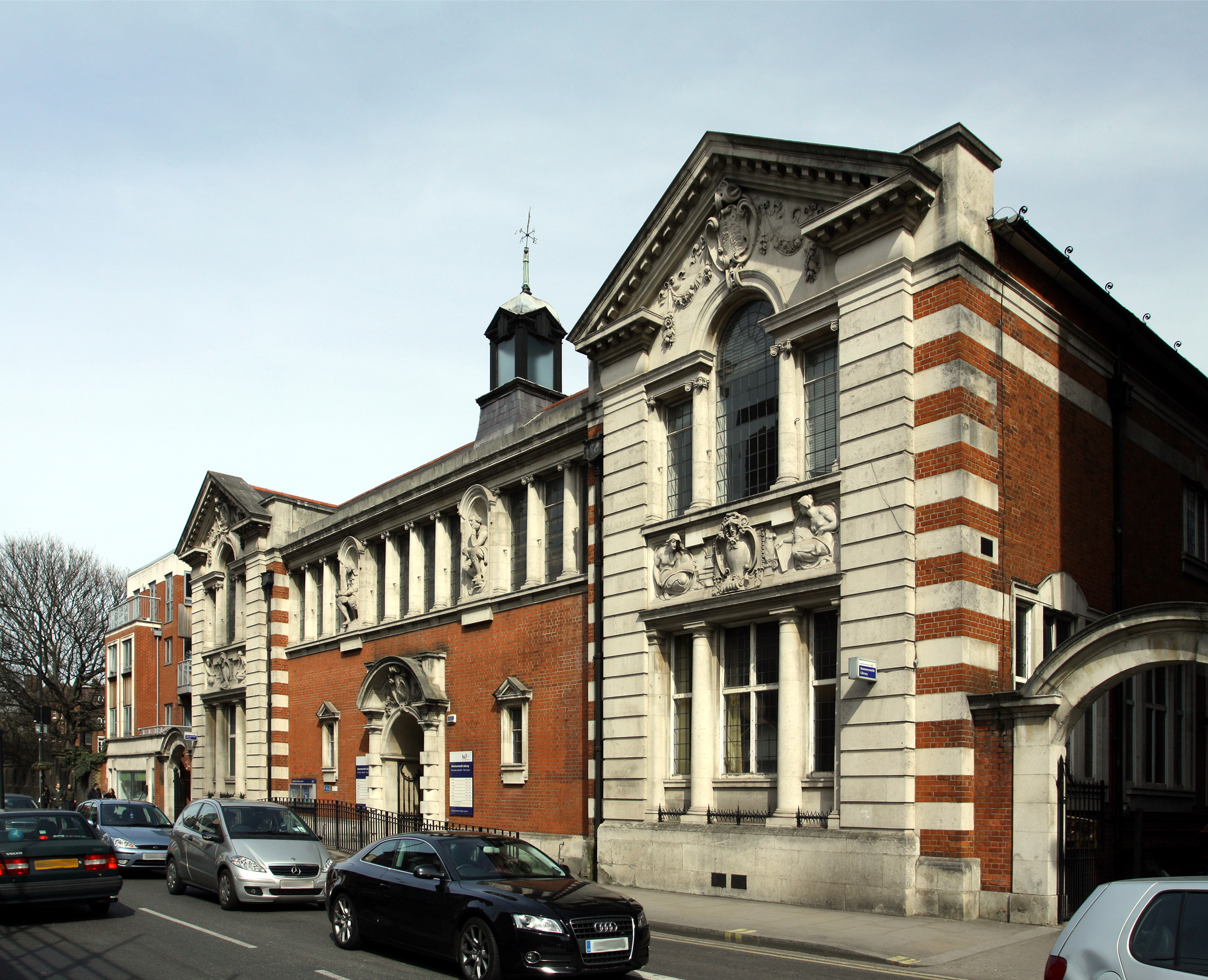
Hammersmith Library

Hammersmith Library is a Grade II listed building at Shepherd's Bush Road, Hammersmith, London W6 7AT.

It was built in 1905 by the architect Henry Hare, with sculpture by F. E. E. Schenck.

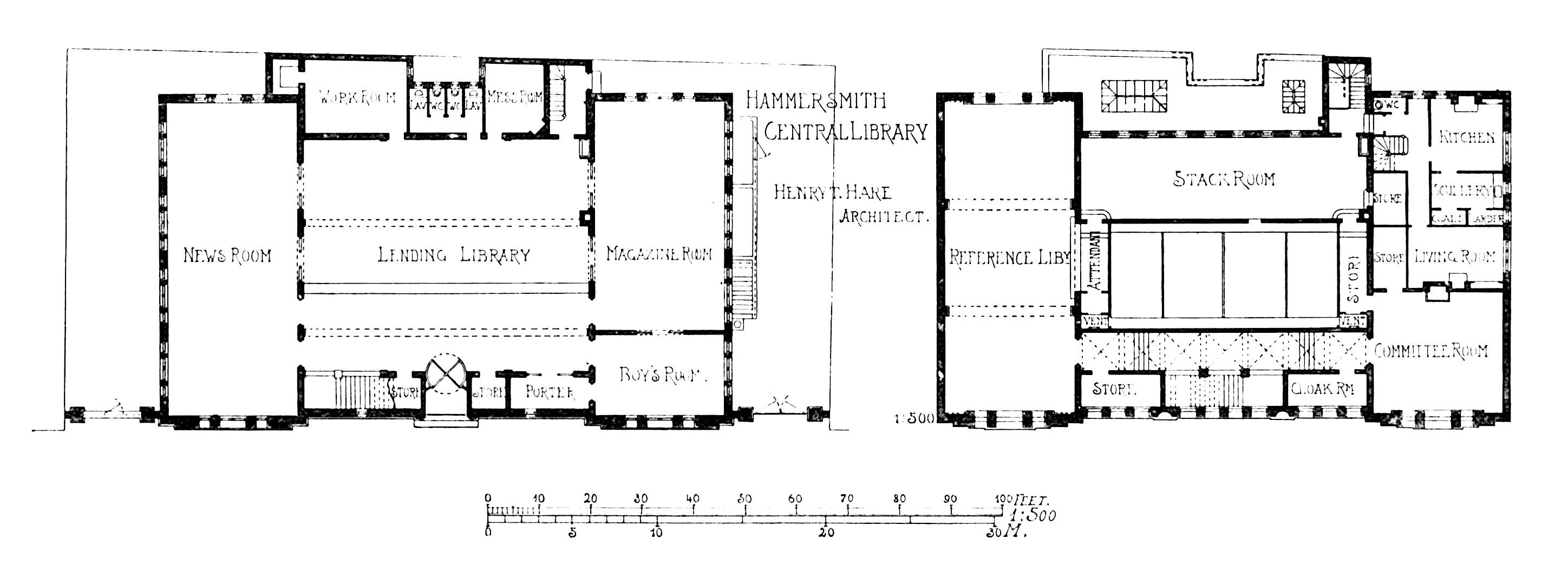
Plan of the Library

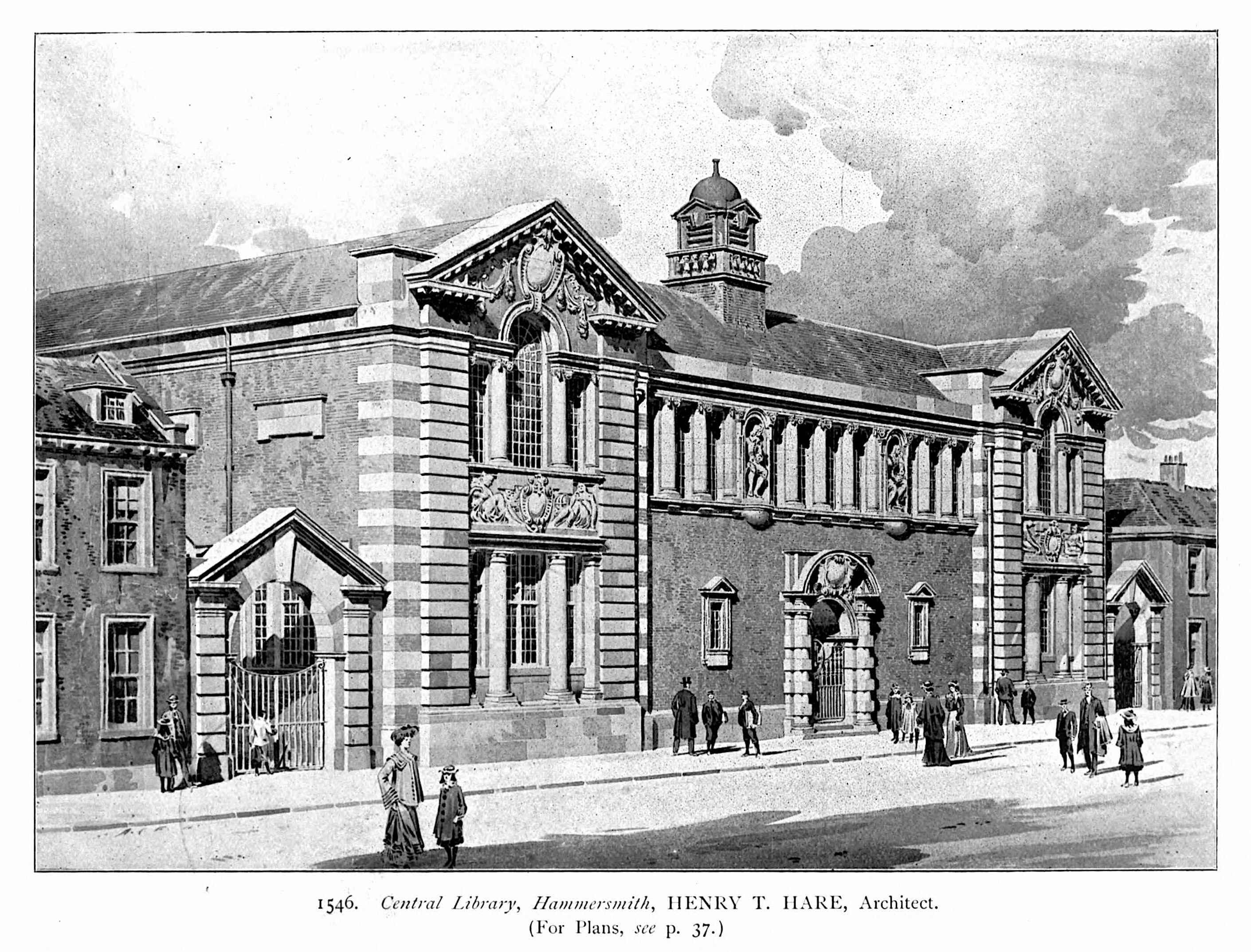
Drawing of the Library

The statues in the façade are as follows: immediately to the top left of the main entrance, on the first floor, is a statue of John Milton, while to the top right of the main door is a statue of William Shakespeare. To the right of these statues, between the windows on the south wing of the library, are a male figure with a book, representing Literature, and a female figure with a paintbrush, representing the Arts; while to the left of the statues of Milton and Shakespeare, between the windows on the north wing, are a female figure with a wheel, representing Spinning, and a male figure with a pair of compasses, representing Astronomy.
