= Fulham Library =

Public library in London, England

Coordinates: 51.4771°N 0.2026°W

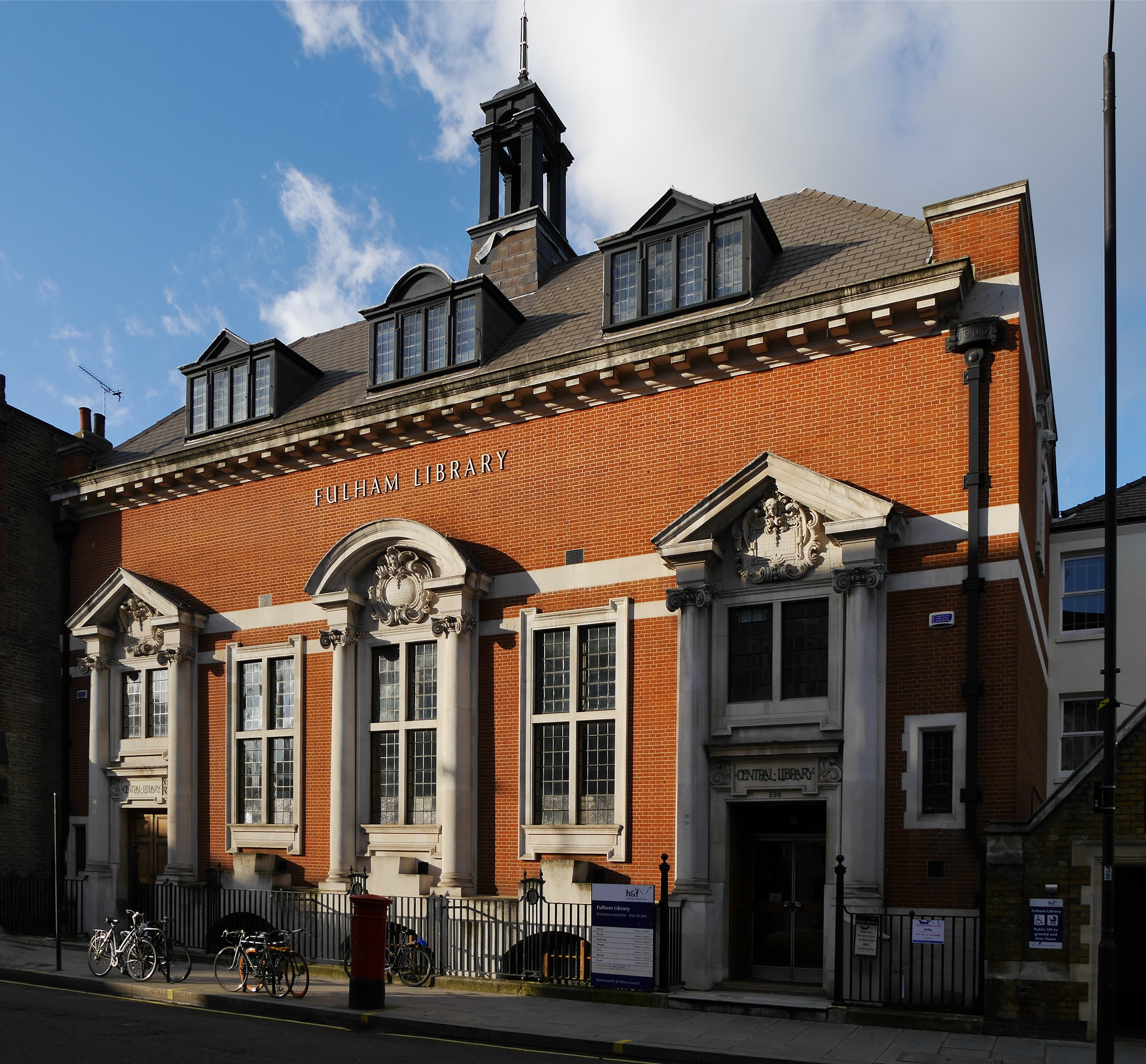
Fulham Library, 2014

Fulham Library is a Grade II listed building at 598 Fulham Road, Fulham, London. It was built in 1908, and the architect was Henry Hare. A library has existed on the site since at least 1894.

Among the staff was Edward Dudley, winner of the Chartered Institute of Library and Information Professionals first Cilip medal, who worked there as a librarian from 1936 to 1939.
