= Islington Local History Centre =

Archive in London, England

- Location within Central London
- Established: 2008
- Location: Finsbury Library, 245 St John Street, London EC1V 4NB, UK
- Coordinates: 51.526486°N 0.104553°W
- Type: Local studies centre and archive
- Public transit access: Angel tube station Farringdon station London Bus route: 153
- Website: Islington Heritage Services

Islington Local History Centre is a local studies centre and archive which holds material documenting the history of the London Borough of Islington.

== History ==
Islington Local History Centre, which is located in Finsbury Library, was opened in 2003. This new centre was established to bring together the local history collections of the former Metropolitan Borough of Islington and Metropolitan Borough of Finsbury. These boroughs were merged in 1965 to form the modern London Borough of Islington. The collections were previously held at Islington's Central Reference Library and in smaller premises at Finsbury Library.

== Collections ==
Resources available at the Local History Centre include maps, photographs, census records, electoral rolls, trade directories, newspapers and archive material. These collections are useful sources for research on family history, local history, biographical history and other subjects.

=== Archives ===
The Islington Local History Centre is not a formal archive repository for Islington Council but its collections include records of the metropolitan boroughs of Finsbury and Islington, including council and committee minutes, rate books and publications, as well as records of the earlier vestries of St James Clerkenwell, St Luke Old Street and St Mary Islington, including minute books and rate books. Other local authority material includes records related to local baths, such as Ironmonger Row Baths.

=== Special collections ===
The centre also holds deposited special collections, including the following material:

- The Islington library book covers vandalised by Joe Orton and Kenneth Halliwell
- Archives of the Sadler's Wells Theatre, the Royal Agricultural Hall and Dove Brothers builders
- Records of the estate of the Penton family of Pentonville
- Records of local societies such as the Islington Literary and Scientific Society
- Personal papers of local people, including the diaries of teacher Gladys Langford and memoir of cabinet maker Henry Price, who made furniture for William Morris
- Artworks and personal papers of Walter Sickert.

== Displays and events ==
The centre has a regular programme of small temporary exhibitions, including visiting displays and displays of material from its own collections. The centre also hosts occasional talks and contributes to the events programme at Islington Museum.

== Admission and access ==
Admission is free and the centre is open to all. However, researchers wishing to view material are required to make an appointment to visit as space is limited. The centre is fully accessible for wheelchair users but there is no accessible parking.

== The Clerk's Well ==
Islington Local History Centre also manages the historic Clerk's Well near Clerkenwell Green. Visits to the well can be arranged free of charge but by appointment only.

== See also ==
- Islington Museum
- Clerk's Well
- Islington Libraries
