= Islington Libraries =

Library system serving Islington, London, United Kingdom

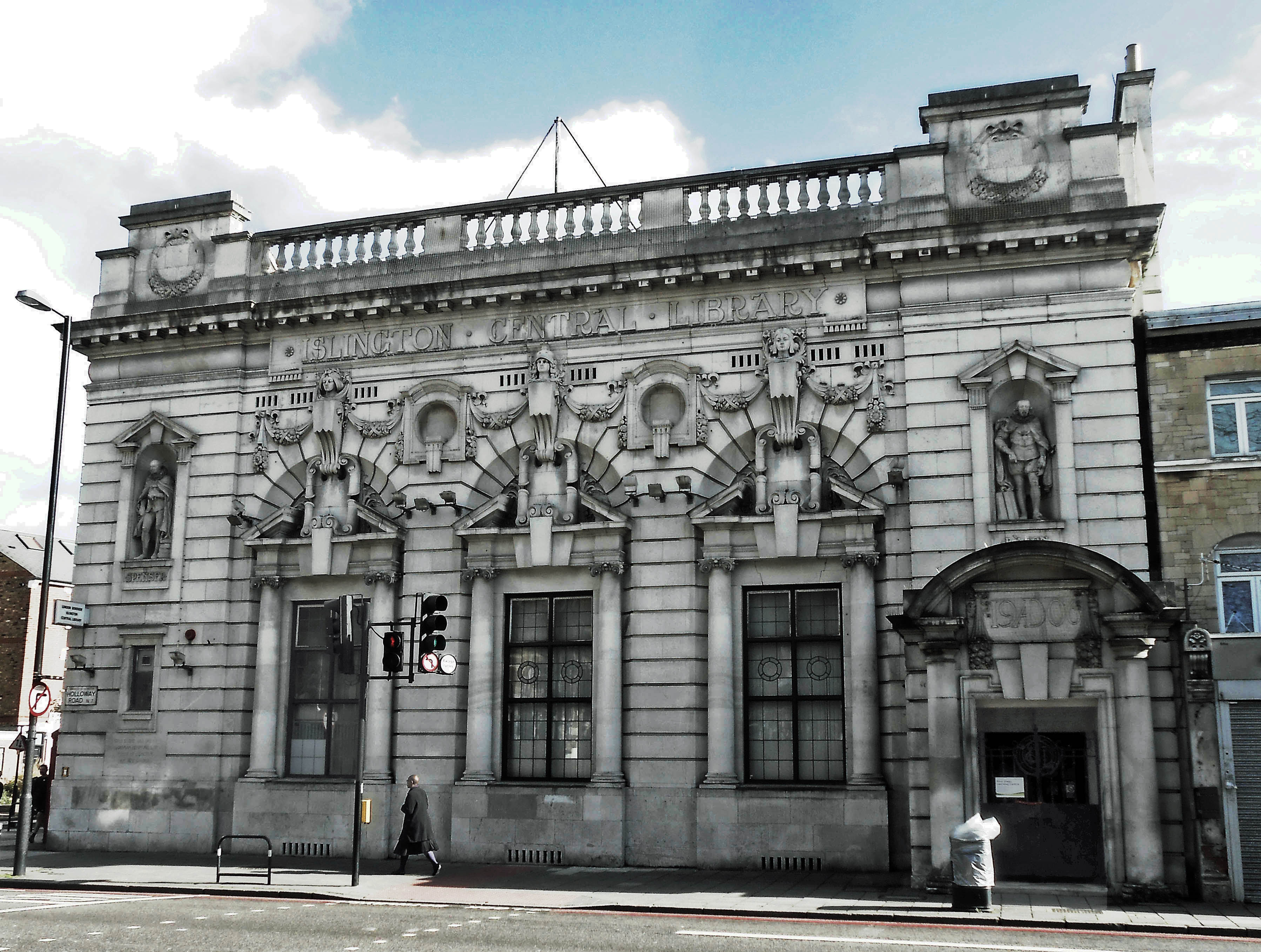
- Islington Central Library, in Highbury
- 51°32′56″N 0°06′25″W
- Location: London, United Kingdom.
- Established: 29 September 1906; 120 years ago
- Branches: 10

Collection
- Size: 146,526

Access and use
- Access requirements: Anyone can join
- Circulation: 530,267 (2024/25)
- Population served: 223,024 (2024)
- Members: 23,472 (2024/25)

Other information
- Budget: £3.93 million (2024/25)
- Director: Joanne Moulton
- Employees: 74 FTE (2018/19)
- Website: www.islington.gov.uk/libraries-arts-and-heritage/libraries

Islington Libraries constitute the public library service for the borough of Islington in London. The service provides the best level of library access of any council in the country, with 97% of residents within a 15-minute walk of a branch.

The service opened its first library in 1906, after decades of campaigns. Since then, the service and its staff have played a key role in defining the modern public library, incorporating and advocating for open-access shelving, more gender-equal employment, children's libraries, and affordability.

The service's Central Library is in Highbury, and is one of the service's four Grade II listed Carnegie libraries. Following World War II, the service built more branches and now runs ten libraries, including the "library of light"-style Finsbury Library, which houses the Islington Local History Centre and Islington Museum.

The service has a £3.93 million budget, overseen by the Islington Borough Council. Over the past two decades, the Council implemented budget cuts: these have led to more limited opening hours, but not to branch closures. In 2024/25, the library loaned out 530,000+ items physically (+12% year-on-year), 325,000+ items online (+4%), and registered 890,000 visits (+6.5%).

== History ==
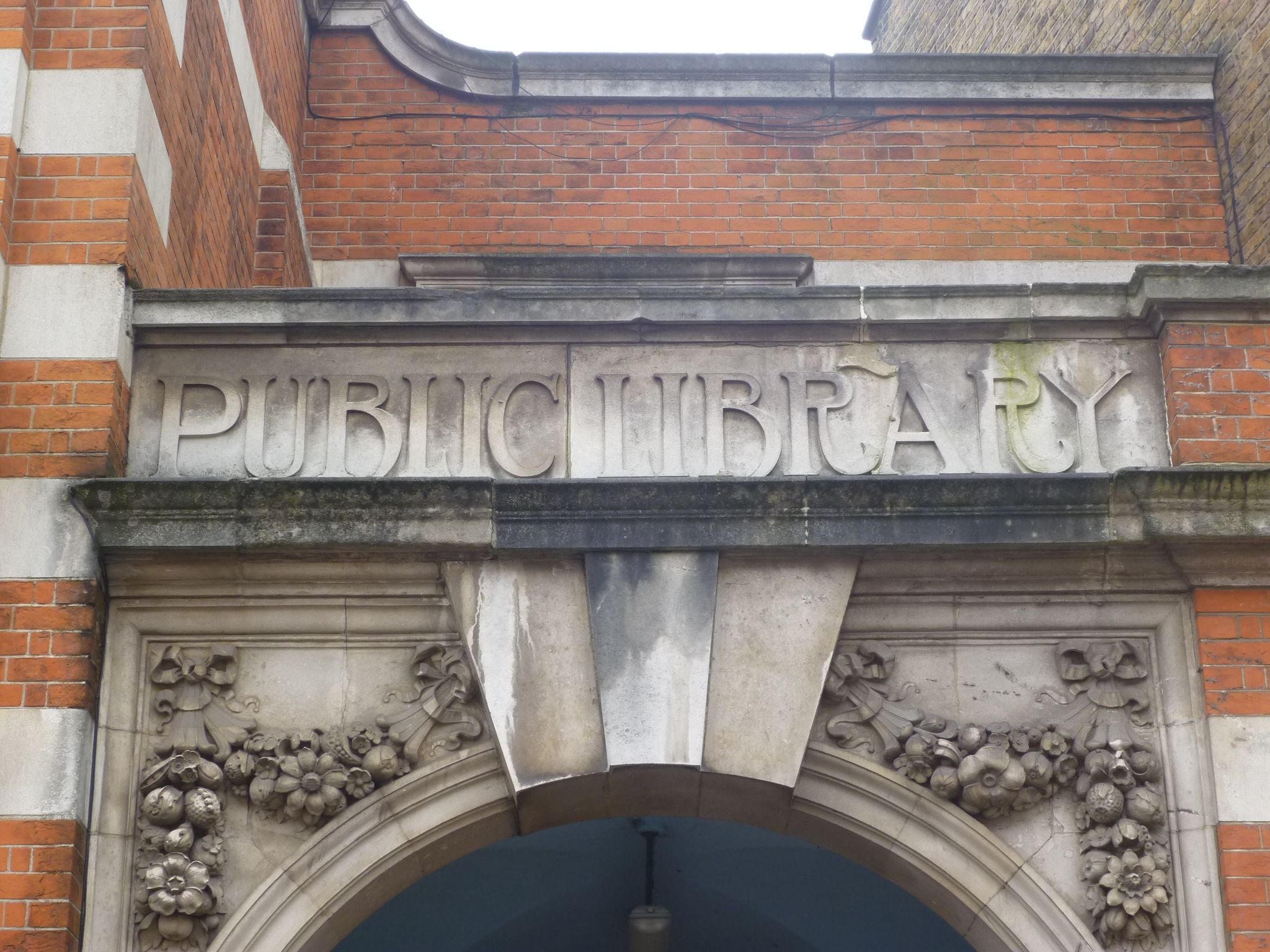
North Library was the first Islington public library to open, in 1906

=== 1855-1921: Founding ===
Despite the passage of the Public Libraries Act of 1850, it took Islington until 1905 to establish its first public libraries. In that half century, there were a number of failed efforts to establish public libraries.

A first attempt seems to have been made in 1855, when a public meeting was held at St. Mary's, to address a motion from an MP for Finsbury (Thomas Challis) for the establishment of a free public library system. The motion failed, upon objections that war taxation "had greviously burdened" people, and taxing poor ratepayers for the project would cause "more evil than good." Another attempt was made in 1874, when Professor Leone Levi proposed the formation of a free public library and museum -- the motion was rejected 1,435 to 338.

In 1897, Passmore Edwards offered £5,000 for the building of a central library, and twice £2,500 for the building of two other library buildings, on the condition that Islingtonians agree to maintain the libraries. Passmore had helped fund libraries in other parts of London (such as in Shepherd's Bush, or Dulwich). In his offer, he lamented that:

"such a large and commanding parish like Islington, should have no such libraries, and particularly when so many other smaller and poorer parishes in London have adopted the Public Libraries Act, and provided themselves with libraries [... I] now leave the matter in the hands of the ratepayers of Islington, and hope they will practically act on it, and so be abreast of other London districts, in the promotion of a great education and ameliorative enterprise."

By a majority of 3,075, Islington ratepayers rejected the proposal.

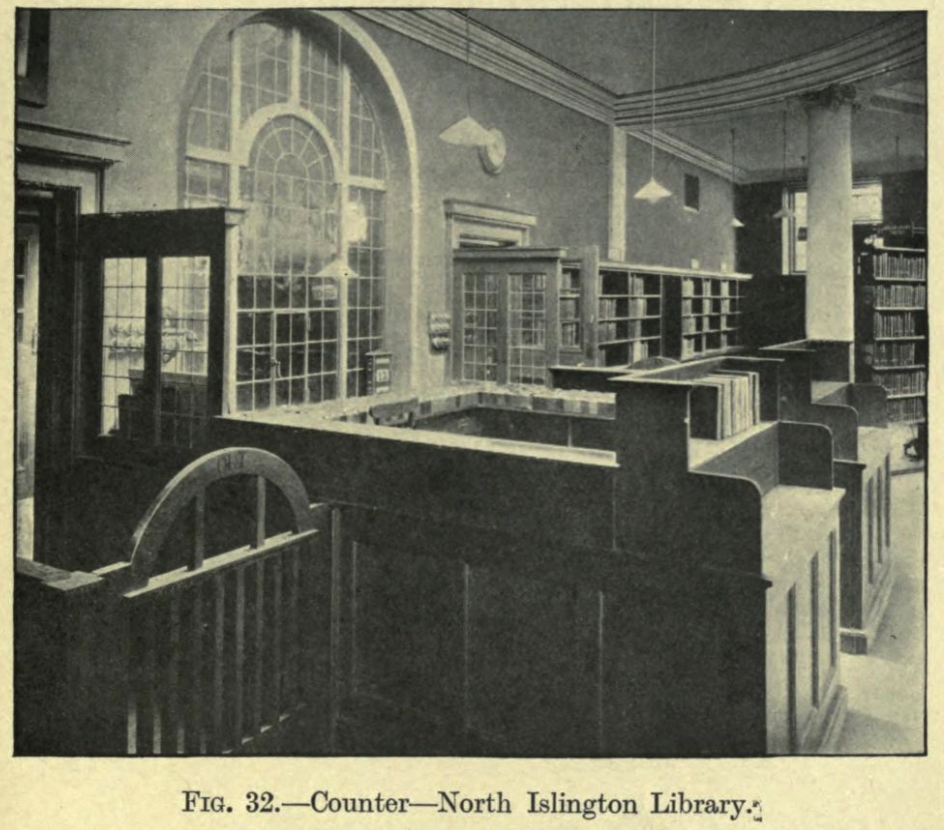
The book counter at the North Library in 1915

In 1904, plans for a central library and four branches were finally adopted, with the support of £40,000 (equivalent to £4.2 million in 2025) from Andrew Carnegie. The system's first library, North Library, opened off of Holloway Road in 1906.

By 1921, the system had expanded to also include the Central, West and South Libraries (all four are considered Carnegie Libraries), and to contain more than 95,000 volumes in its lending departments, as well as 10,000 works of reference. Library usage grew dramatically after the end of the first World War. According to a 1922 report of the Islington Public Libraries Committee, the total number of books borrowed was 585,368 in 1919/20 -- this roughly doubled by 1921/22 to 1,052,914.

=== 20th century: service expansion ===
Following World War II, additional branch libraries opened, including a dedicated children's library. The passage of the Public Libraries and Museums Act of 1964 mandated that councils provide a "comprehensive and efficient library service" to all those "whose residence or place of work is within the library area of the authority or who are undergoing full-time education within that area".

The 1965 merger of the borough of Finsbury into Islington led to Finsbury Library becoming the newest (and southernmost) public library in Islington upon its opening in 1967.

In the 1950s and 60s, Joe Orton and Kenneth Halliwell began surreptitiously to remove books from several Islington Libraries and to modify the cover art or the blurbs before returning them -- activities for which they were later convicted and incarcerated. In "Library Tolls and Database Animals," Melissa Hardie argues that "rather than simply disrupt the circulation of library books the men introduced queer objects to the library that facilitated and fostered new and more engaged understandings of the library's collection of book objects." The book covers (some of which can be viewed online) have since become a valued part of the Islington Local History Centre collection, with some exhibited in the Islington Museum. Amidst debates about how the Orton archives should have been handled, literary critic Simon Shepherd credits librarian Eric Willats as having "the foresight to establish and mainstream an Orton archive before Orton became an industry." In 2000, The Guardian qualified the collection (and the library as a whole) of a "local treasure."

In 1986, Islington Libraries was one of several Labour-controlled library services that was called out for refusing to stock News International publications. Richard Luce, the Arts Minister, threatened to force them to stock the publications due to their obligations under the Public Libraries and Museums Act.

=== 21st century: library renovations, budget cuts and COVID-19 ===
At the start of the 21st century, all libraries in the system were either rebuilt or renovated. In 2004, the N4 library opened, followed in 2008 by the reopening of the Lewis Carroll Children's Library. In 2017, Islington opened the Cat and Mouse Library, which replaced the John Barnes library, and maintained the number of libraries in Islington -- bucking a national trend of library closures. The Library was named after Cat and Mouse laws, and aims to recognize the sacrifices endured by Suffragettes imprisoned in Holloway Prison, which used to stand nearby. The other seven libraries in the service all experienced refurbishment at some point between 2000 and 2025, with the Central Library experiencing a significant refresh.

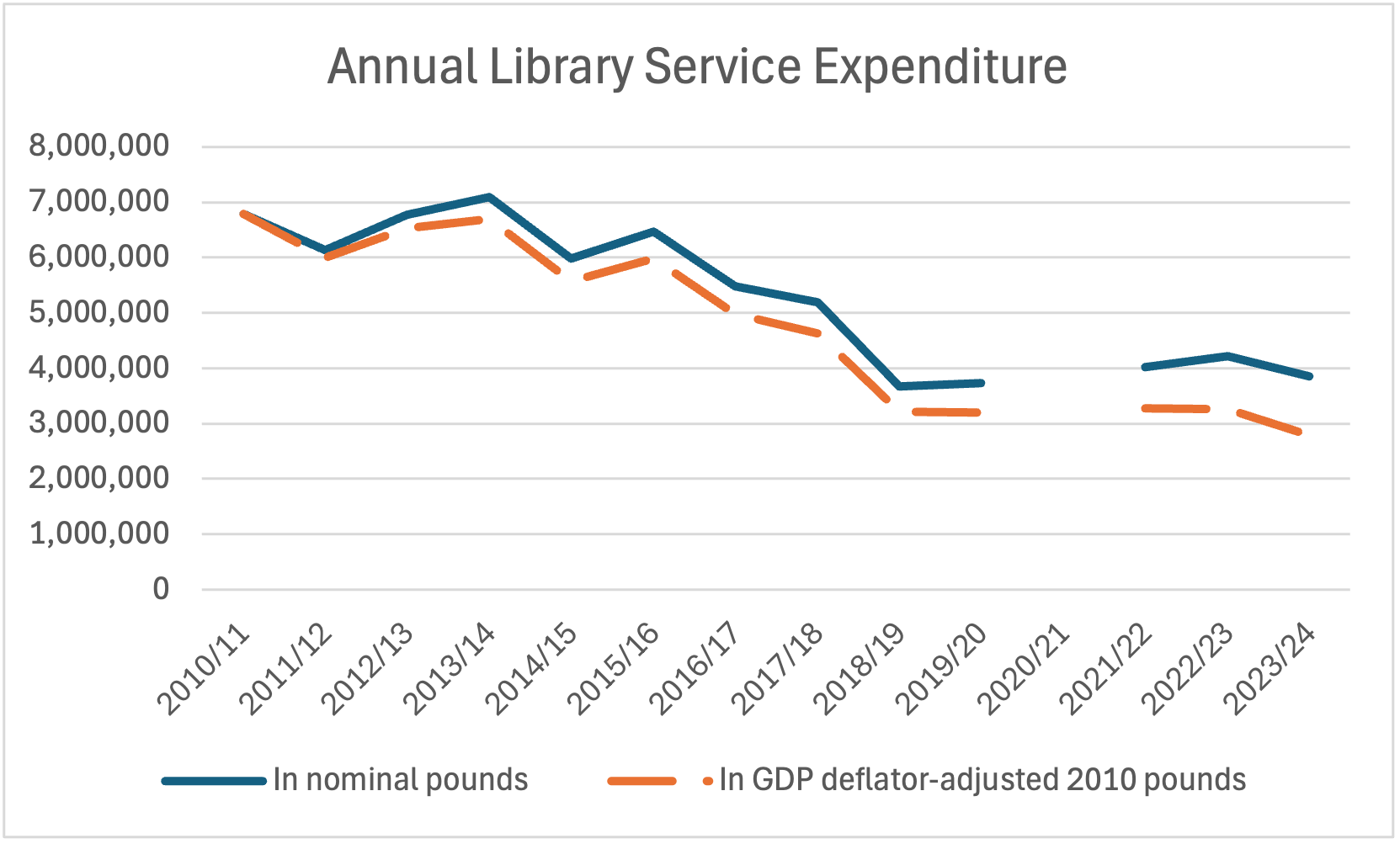
In adjusted 2010 pounds, the budget has shrunk by nearly 75%.

Budget cuts in the 2010s led to expenditure cuts for libraries, which have yet to be reversed. As of 2024/2025, the total expenditure on the library service stood at £3.93 million, a decrease from the nearly £6.8 million in 2010/2011, particularly when accounting for inflation. Most of the funding goes towards staff costs, at a higher share of overall expenditure than peer library services.

View source data.

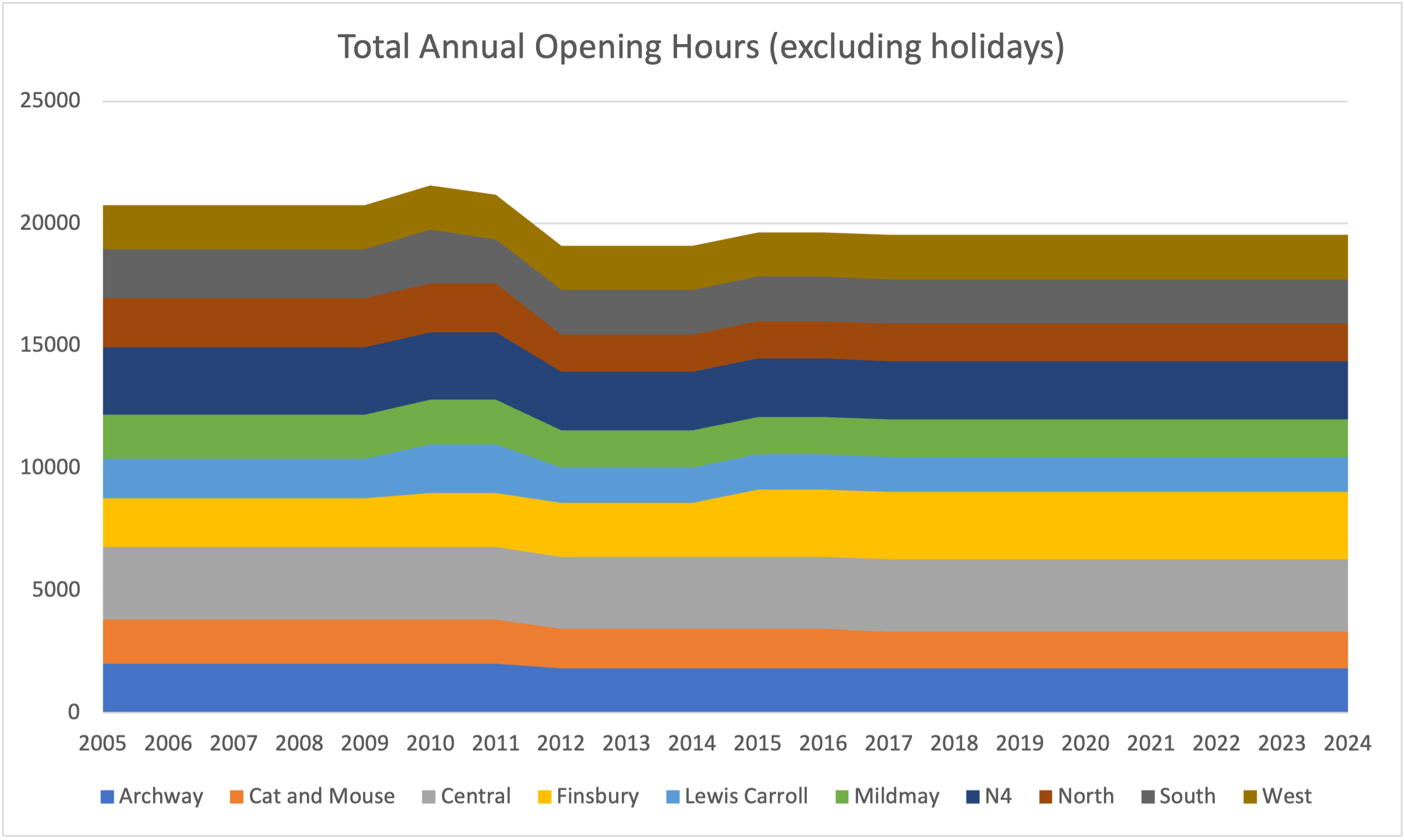
The North Library saw its opening hours drop by nearly 25%.

Opening hours for all libraries except Central, West and Finsbury were cut, and have yet to fully recover -- as of 2023/24 they were down 6%, or around 1200 hours annually. In 2011, partly to reduce costs, the system began to introduce automated terminals for book check-outs.

In 2016, in partnership with the ALA, British Library and Free Word, Islington Libraries led the organization of Banned Books Week for the first time in the UK. Then Islington council member Asima Shaikh noted that "Islington – one-time home of George Orwell, with its rich history of radical thought, creative expression, and innovation – is the perfect place to celebrate Banned Books Week." Additional iterations took place in 2018, 2019 and 2021.

During the COVID-19 crisis, all libraries were closed to the public at various times, with libraries later serving as vaccination centers.

In 2023, Islington Council ended library fines in the name of access, and in the context of the "cost of living" crisis. In 2014/15 and 2015/16, around £60,000 had been charged in overdue fees.

In 2024/25, Islington Libraries had 23,472 active members (+5.7% year-on-year).

In September 2026, the Council confirmed that a new library strategy was being developed: a quarter of the library budget may be shifted to other Council priorities, with potential library closures to follow.

=== Potential future developments ===
The development at Vorley Road, expected to start in 2027 and finish in 2029, would include the redevelopment of Archway library.

== Governance ==
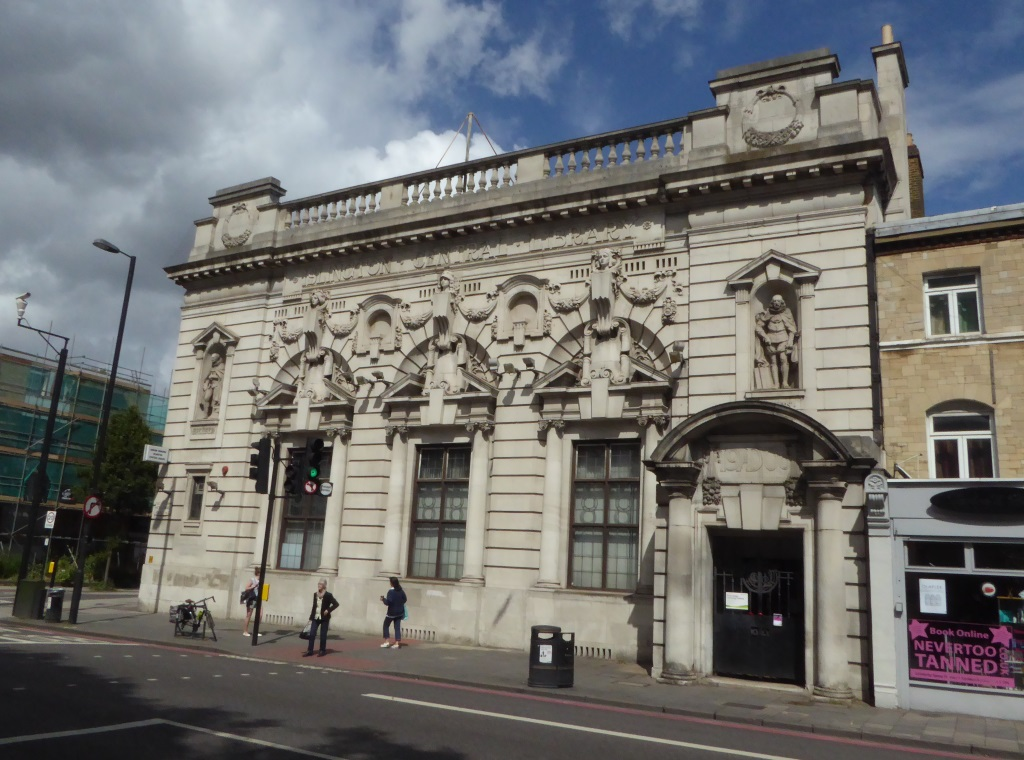
Central Library, the main library for Islington Libraries

The Library Service is a part of the Directorate of Community Engagement and Wellbeing.

Within the Islington Council, libraries fall within the Equalities, Communities and Inclusion portfolio. As of 2025, Councillor Sheila Chapman (Labour Party, Junction Ward) is the Executive Member for this portfolio.

The Library Service is also overseen by the Homes and Communities Scrutiny Committee.

== Services ==
Islington Libraries provides a wide array of services, including access to books, music, DVDs and other physical items; access to e-books, audiobooks and other digital media; as well as access to computers and the internet. Five of the libraries (Mildmay, North, West, Central and Finsbury) also offer toy libraries, where parents can borrow toys for their children. In 2024/25, the service issued 530,267 items physically (+12% year-on-year), and 325,833 items online (+4%), with the most loaned out title being Andrew O'Hagan's Caledonian Road. The service uses the Library Management Cloud LMS, and provides dedicated reading lists on subjects and for specific communities, and buys monthly selections of LGBTQ+ books from Gay's the word bookshop.

2024/25 most loaned out titles
Ranking	Title	Author	Total issues
1	Caledonian Road	Andrew O'Hagan	310
2	Intermezzo	Sally Rooney	259
3	Butter	Asako Yuzuki	232
4	Yellowface	R.F. Kuang	197
5	Long Island	Colm ToÌbin	179
6	The bee sting	Paul Murray	170
7	You Are Here	David Nicholls	162
8	No brainer	Jeff Kinney	157
9	All fours	Miranda July	154
10	Orbital	Samantha Harvey	152

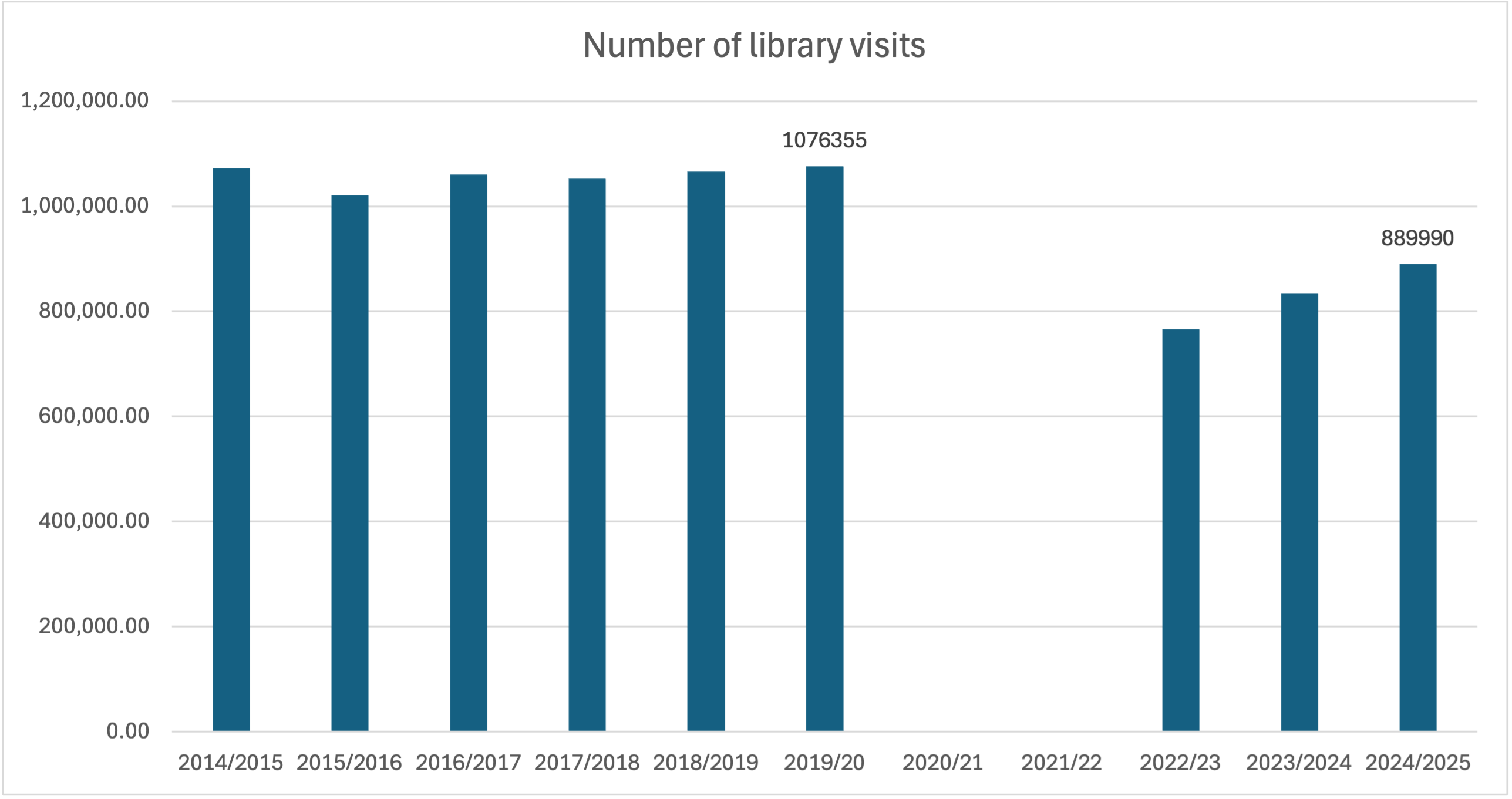
Library visits still have not recovered to pre-covid levels -- but are making progress in that direction

In 2024/25, the library registered 889,990 visits, a 6.5% increase on the previous year, with continued progress towards the pre-covid high of 1,076,355 in 2019-2020 (see figure). For those unable to go to a library in person, the service runs a Home Library Service that can bring books, CDs and DVDs to residents in Islington. The service is regular and free.

The service organizes a number of events in the library spaces, ranging from reading and game sessions for children, to exercise and gadget support classes for adults. In 2024/25, 62,789 people attended events across the libraries (+9.7%), including 29,633 children. Library staff have been trained to welcome and support homeless people; Islington libraries function as "warm spaces" in winter months.

The borough's LGBT History Month programme is co-organised with Camden with events across both boroughs in February in many of the libraries.

== Branches ==
As of 2025, Islington operates a total of 10 public libraries, meaning that Islington had one library for every ±22,000 residents.

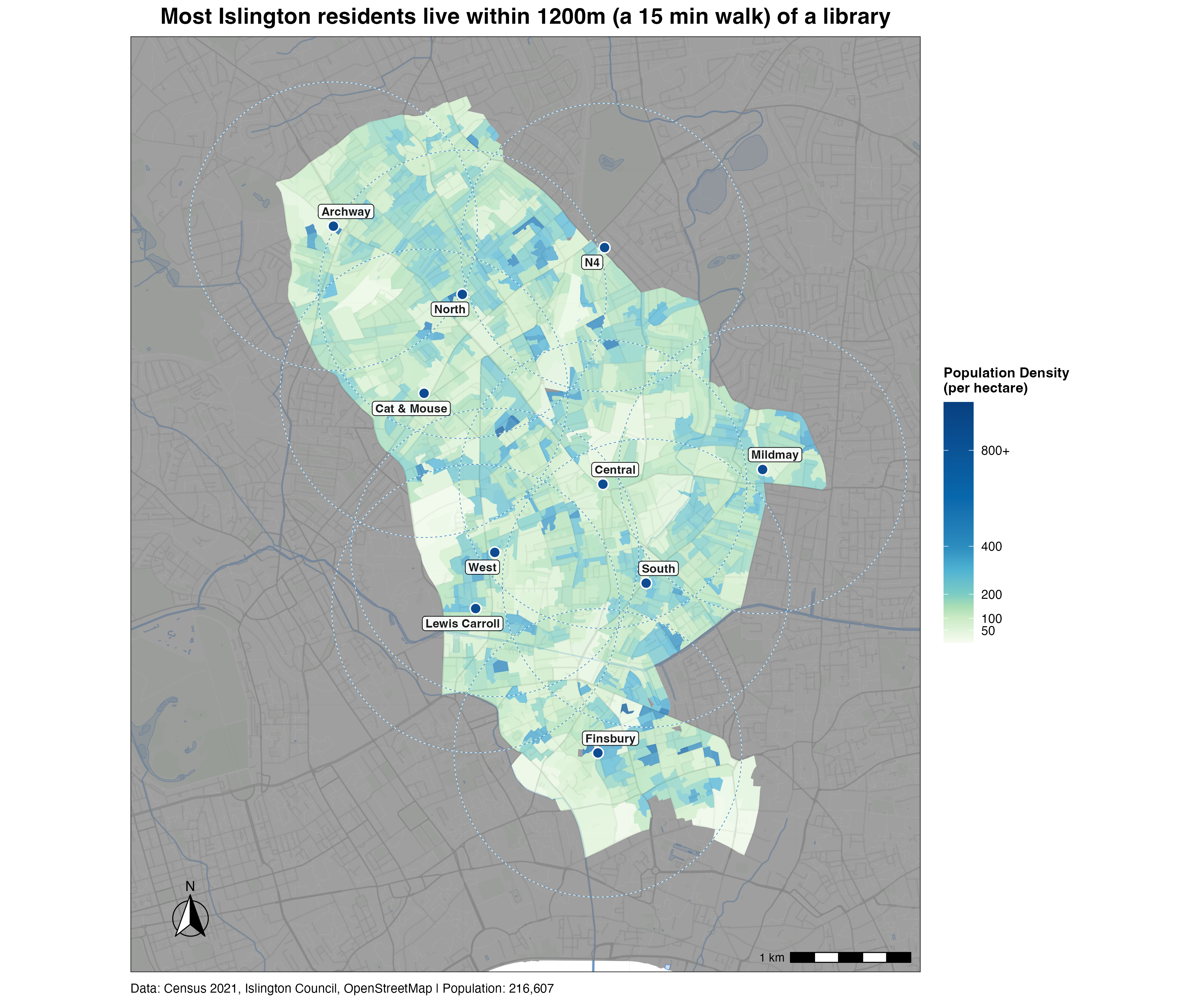
Map of Islington libraries

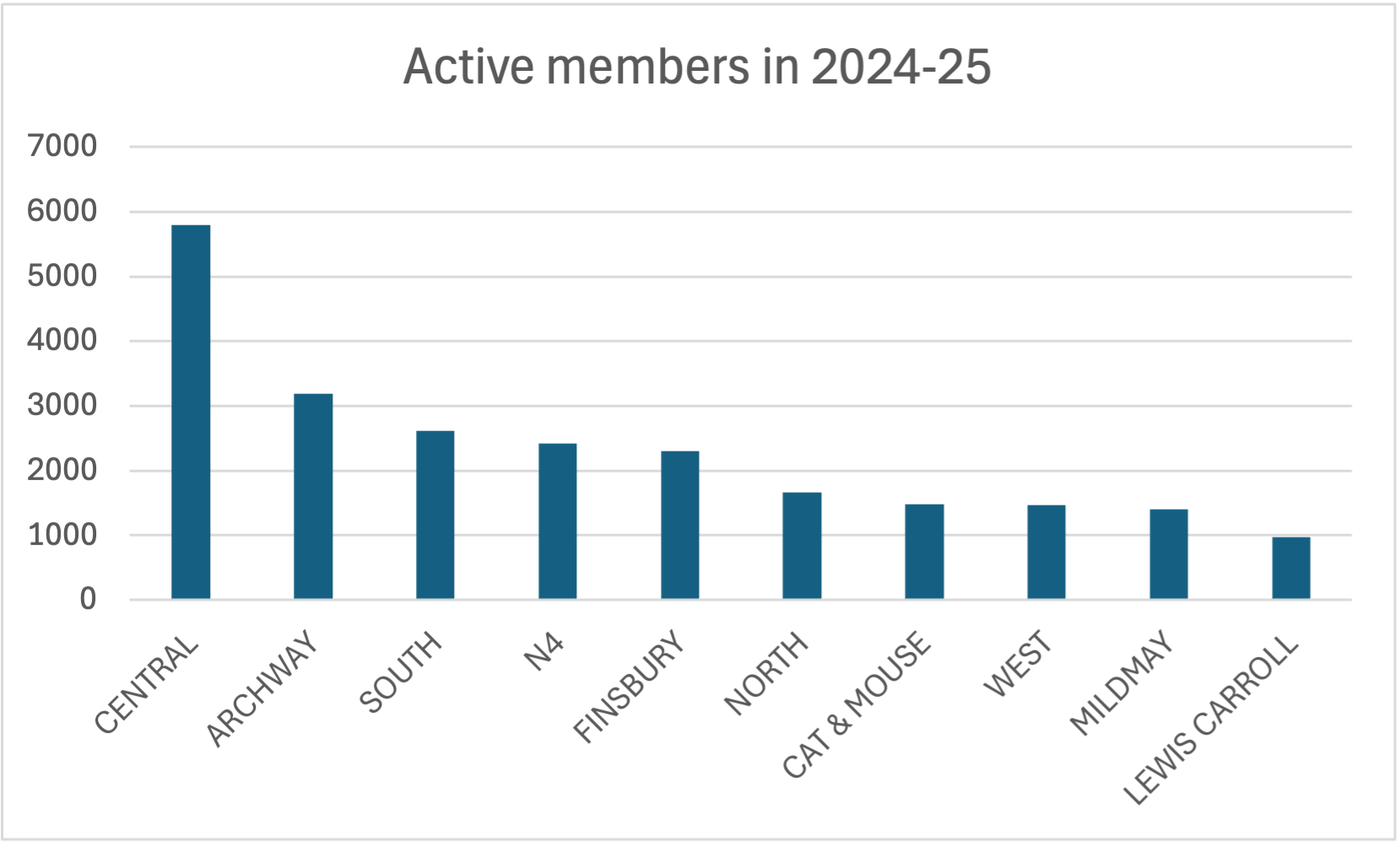
The library with the fewest members was the Lewis Carroll Children's Library.

As of the 2021 Census, 97% of Islingtonian residents had a library within a 15-minute walk, the highest proportion in England and Wales (see map). All residents were within a 30-minute walk. According to the 2023-2024 Participation Survey, an estimated 33% of Islingtonians visited a public library in the last year (±5pp).

In 2024/2025, the library in the system with the most active members was the Central library with 5793 members, followed by the Archway and South Libraries (see figure).

=== North, West, Central and South Libraries ===
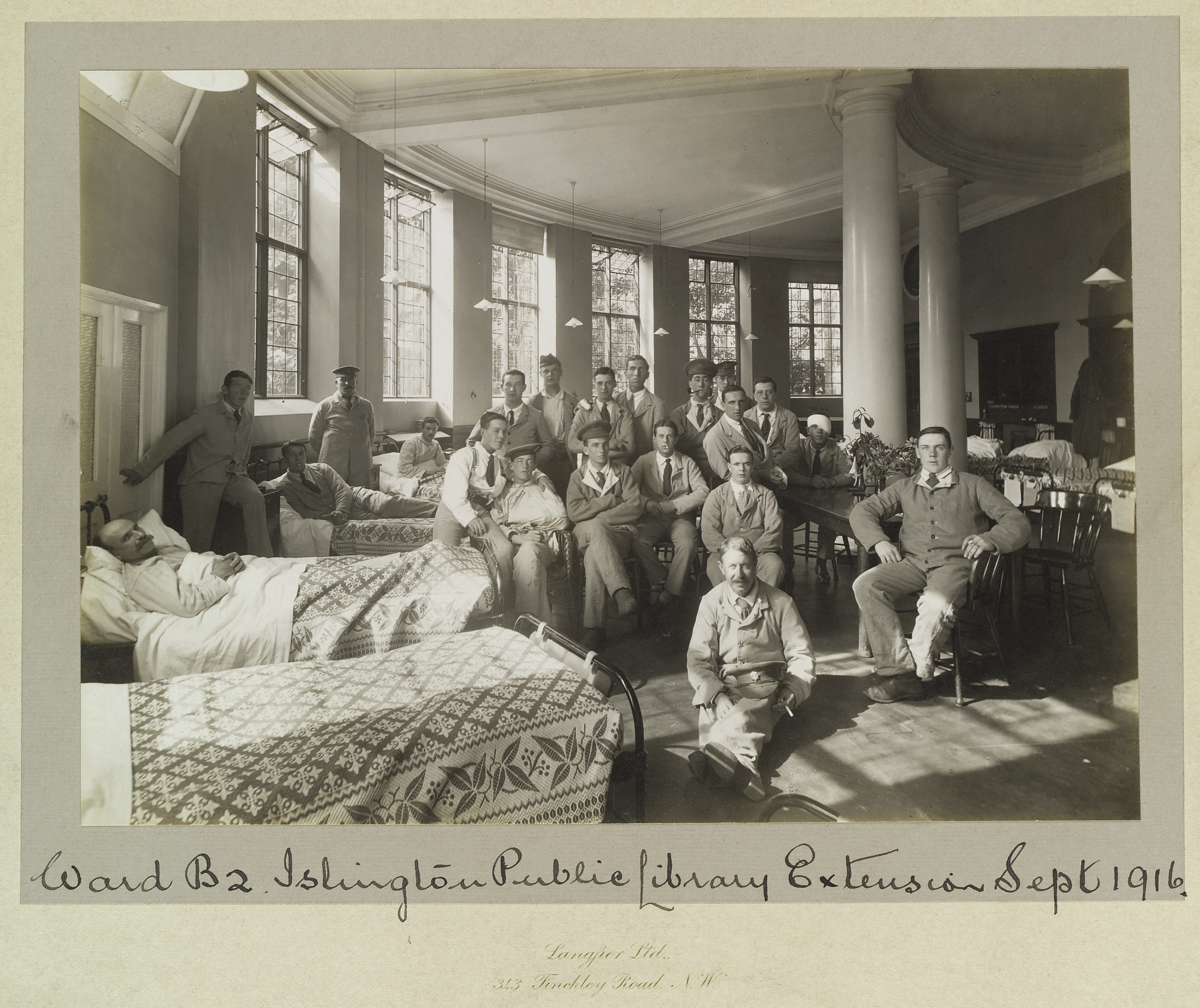
Extension of the North Library used as a hospital ward during World War I

The four historic libraries of Islington are Carnegie libraries, and Grade-II listed. They opened between 1906 and 1921.

- North Library was designed by Henry T. Hare and was opened on 29 September 1906 by Alderman Henry Mills JP, Mayor of Islington. Between 1916 and 1921, the library was used as a military hospital.
- West Library was designed by Beresford Pite, and was built by C Dearing and Sons. It was opened on 24 July 1907 by Alderman G.S. Elliott, and reopened after renovation in 2011.
- Central Library construction started in 1906, also with Hare as architect, and CP Roberts as builder. The building was opened by Sir Arthur Rucker on 4 October 1907. The building was enlarged in 1973-76, and renovated in 2019-2022. It remains the headquarters for Islington Libraries.
- South Library building construction started in 1915, and was completed in December 1916. The building was designed by Mervyn Macartney. In 1920, the library was taken over by unemployed people, who were forcefully evicted on 30 December 1920. It was opened on 21 May 1921 by EH King.
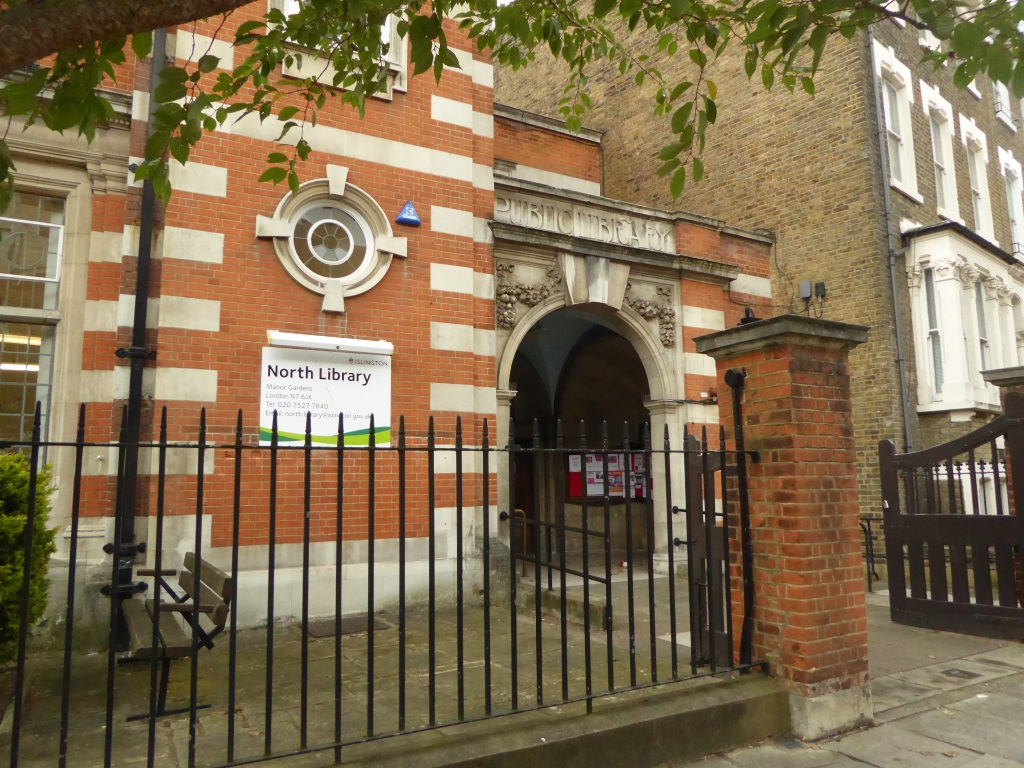
North Library

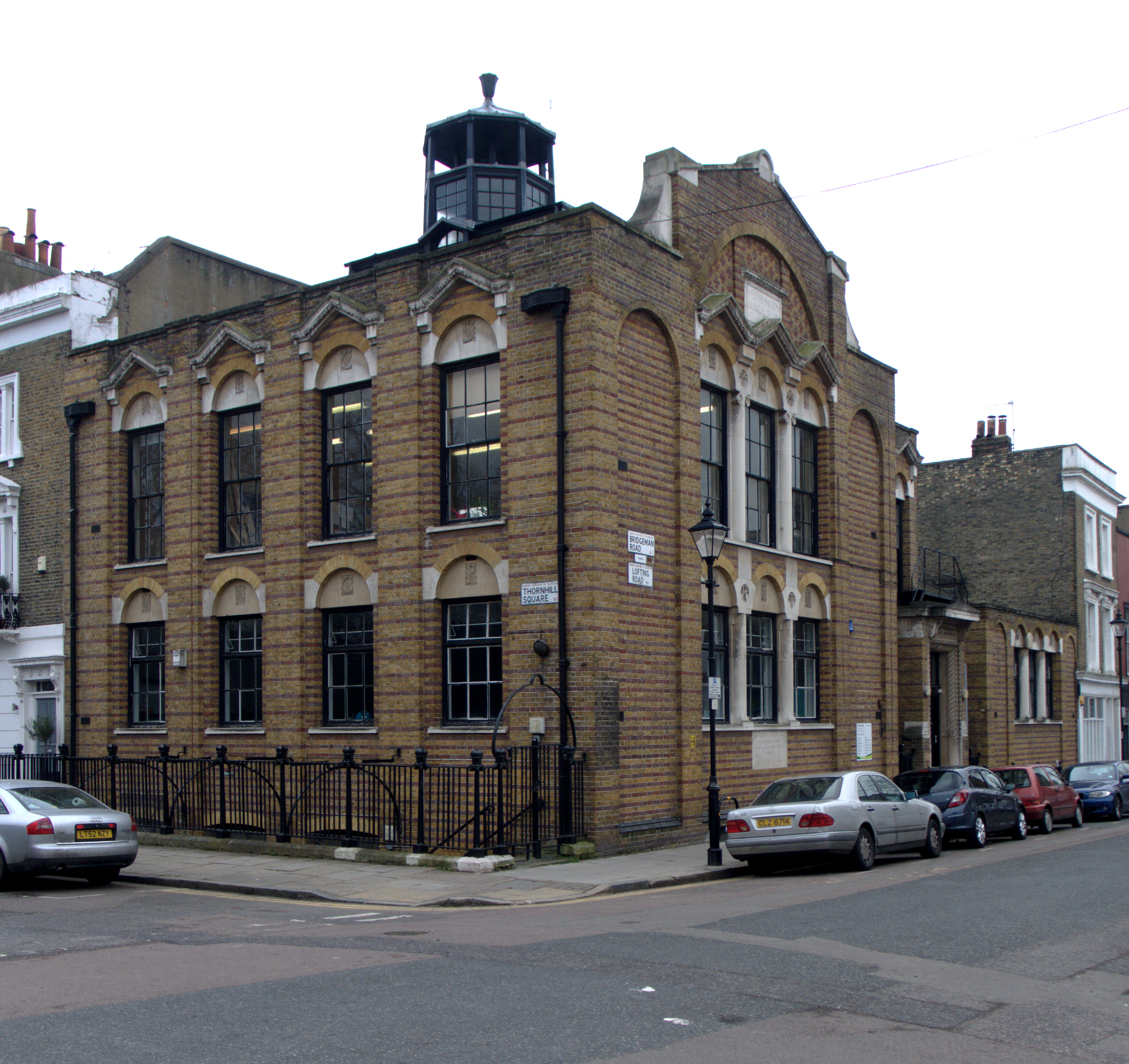
West Library

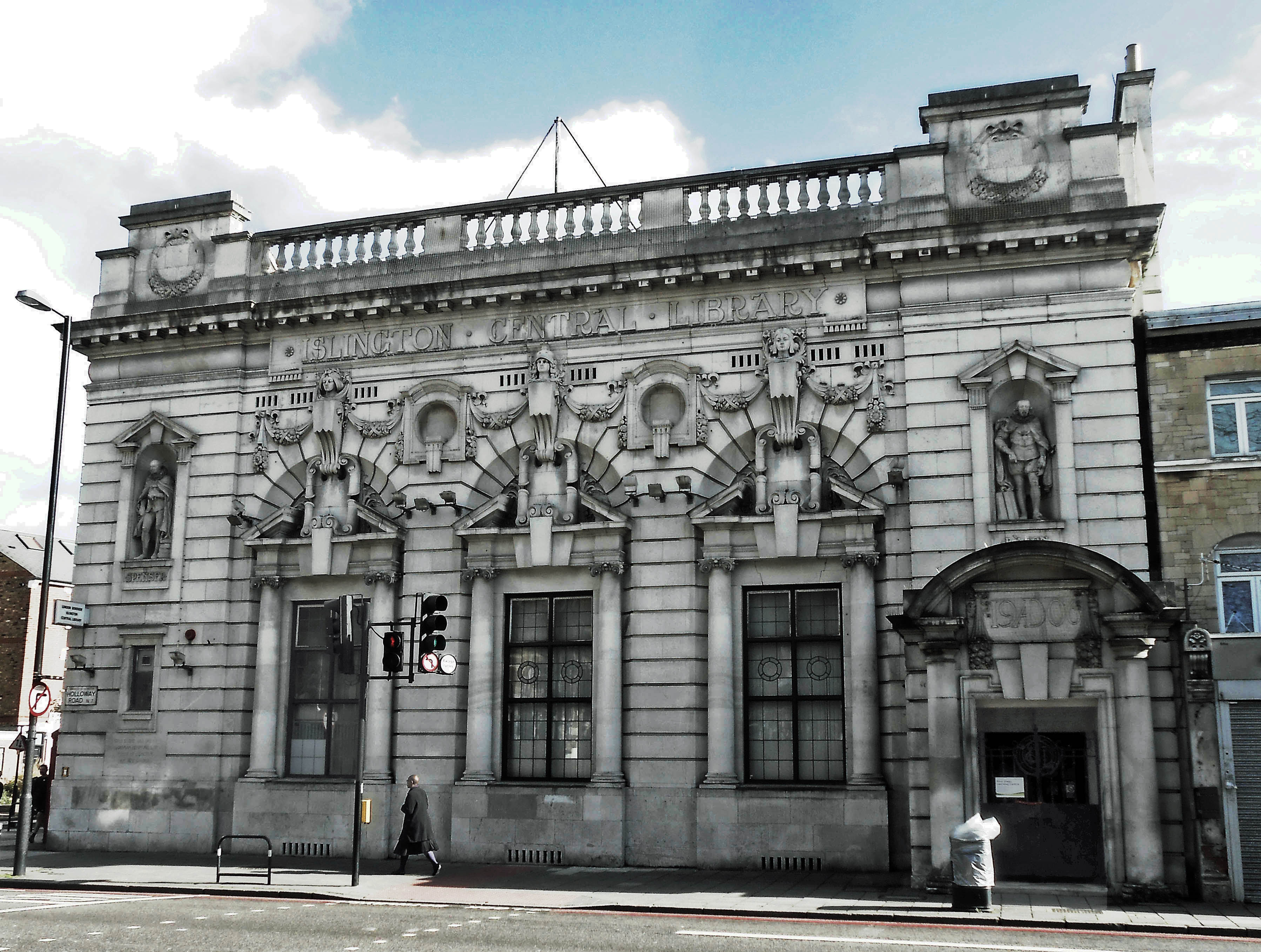
Central Library

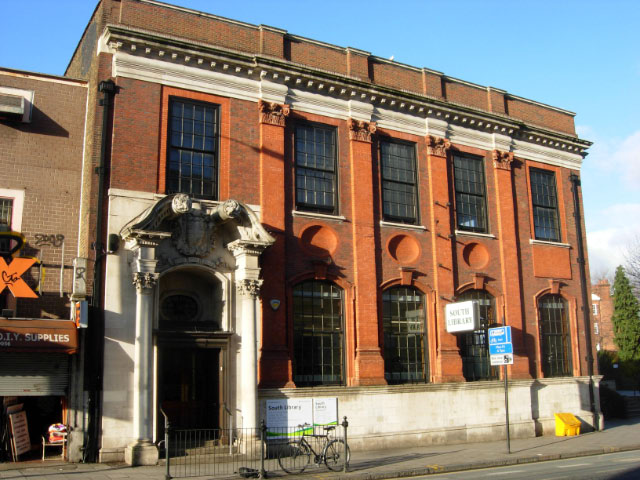
South Library

=== Finsbury Library ===
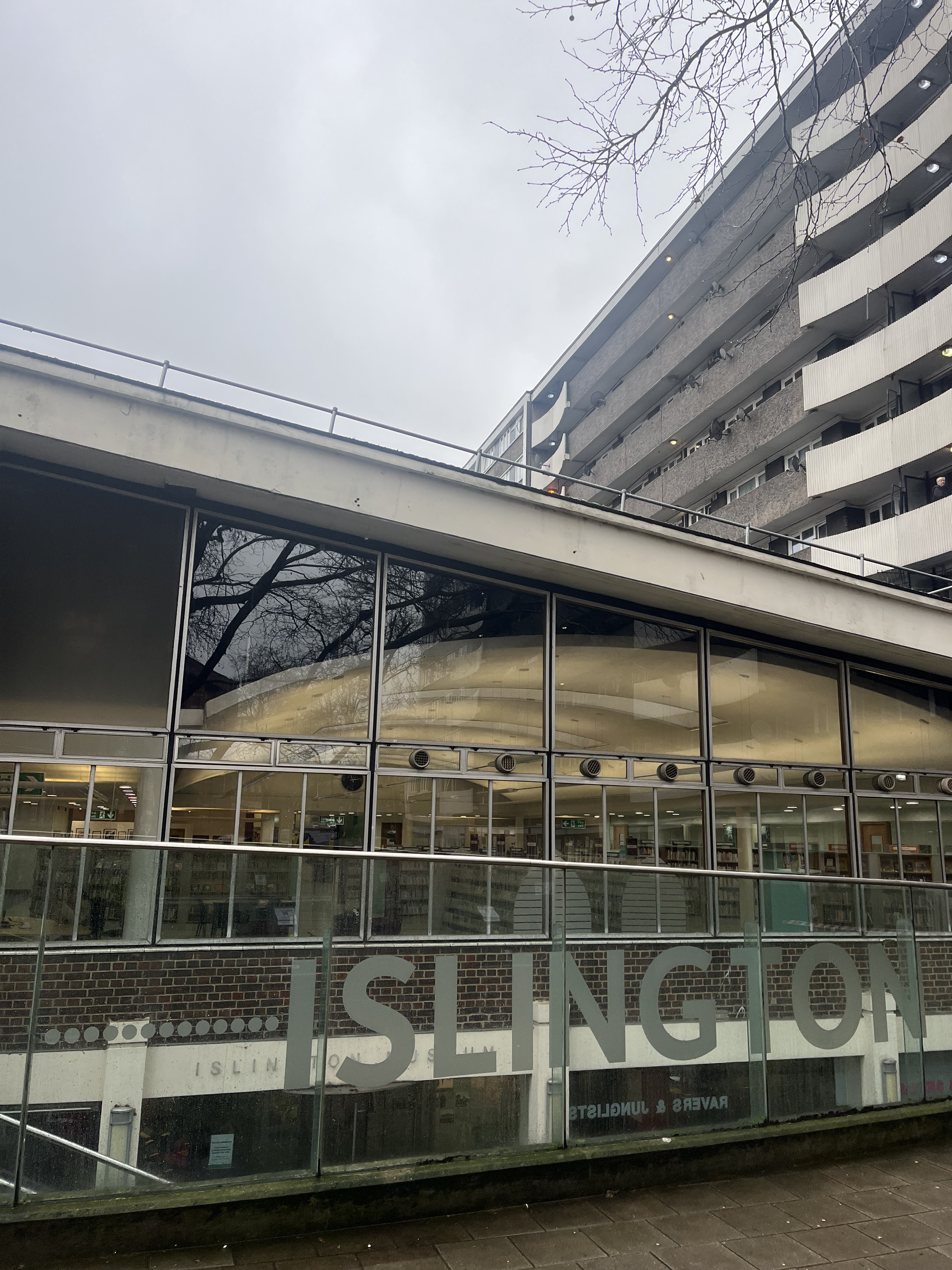
Finsbury Library, with entrance to the Islington Museum in the forefront

Finsbury Library was originally supposed to be the central library for the borough of Finsbury, and was built as part of the redevelopment of the Skinners estate. The building was designed by Ludwig Franck; it replaced the Clerkenwell Free Library (built in 1890), known as the "first modern library in Great Britain" for its use of open shelving in 1894. The new building embodies the "libraries of light" style popular in the post-war. Following the merger of Finsbury into Islington, Finsbury Library ended up as a branch library -- but with significant capacity: it also houses the Islington Local History Centre, the Islington Museum, the Islington Computer Skills Centre and the area Housing Office.

=== Archway, Lewis Carroll, Mildmay, N4, Cat and Mouse Libraries ===
- The Archway Library originally opened on 2 November 1946, and was the first municipal building in Islington to have fluorescent lighting. A redesigned library was opened on 3 December 1980, designed by Alfred Head.
- The Lewis Carroll Children's Library opened in 1952 as one of the first dedicated children's libraries in London. It reopened from renovations in 2008, and remains the most popular library for school visits.
- The Mildmay Library was designed by C.N. Cowney, and was originally opened on 3 April 1954. It closed in 1984, with a fully re-built library re-opening in 1987. The library was further renovated in 2024.
- The N4 Library sits alongside the City and Islington College Centre for Lifelong Learning building, on Blackstock Road. Both were opened in January 2004.
- The Cat and Mouse Library opened on 2 December 2017, near the site of a former library.
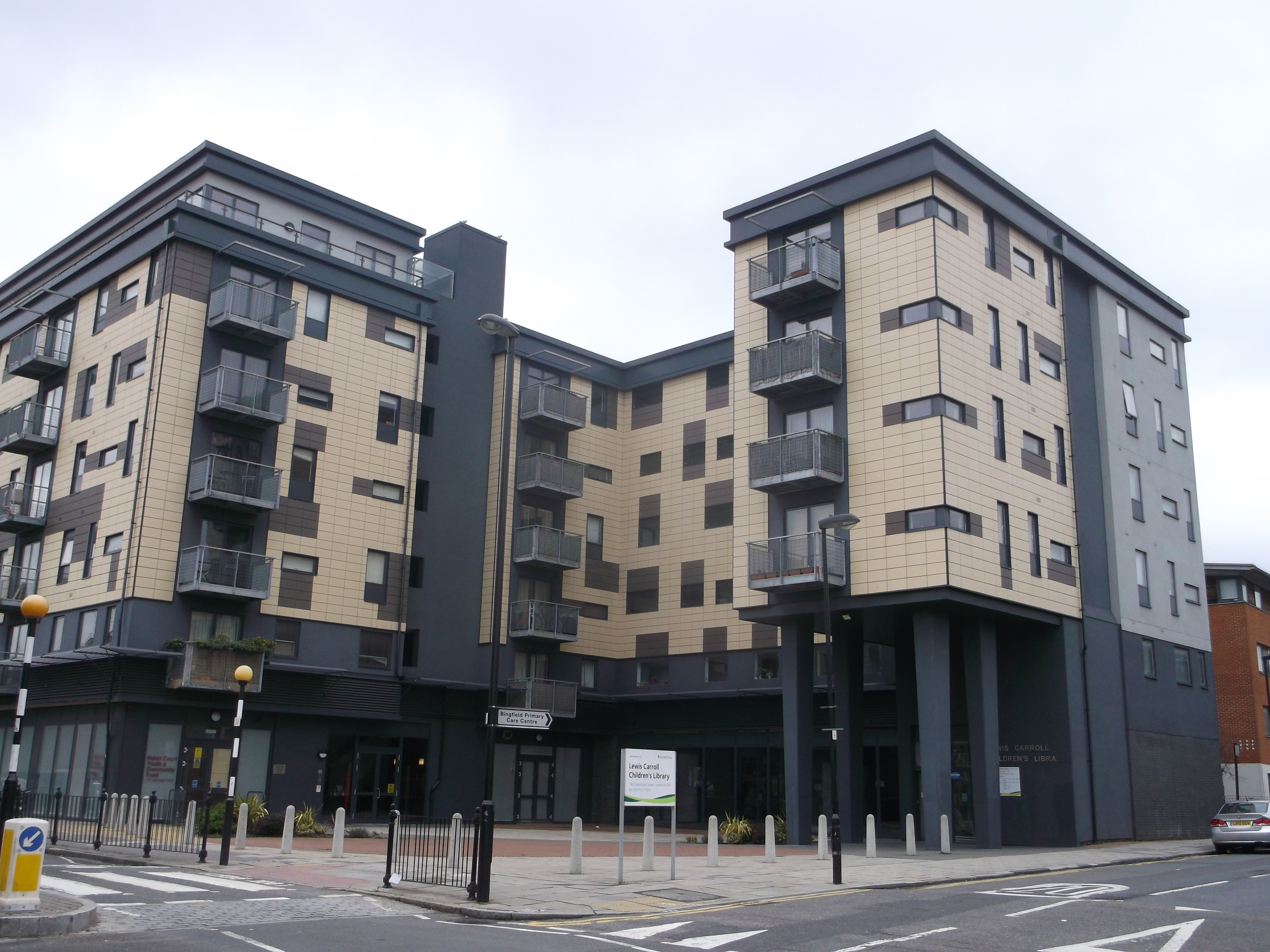
Lewis Carroll Children's Library

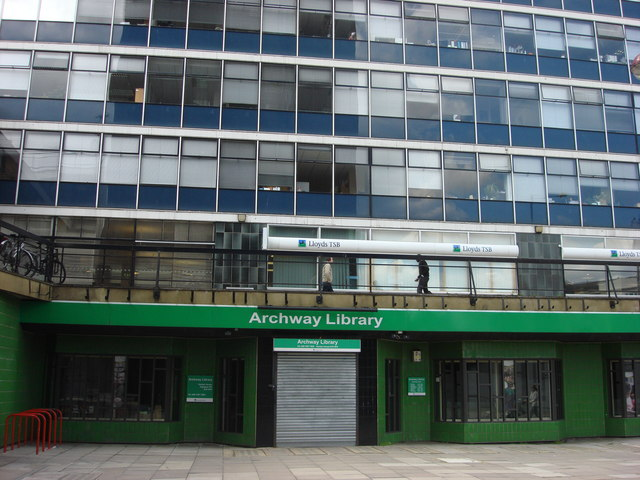
Archway Library

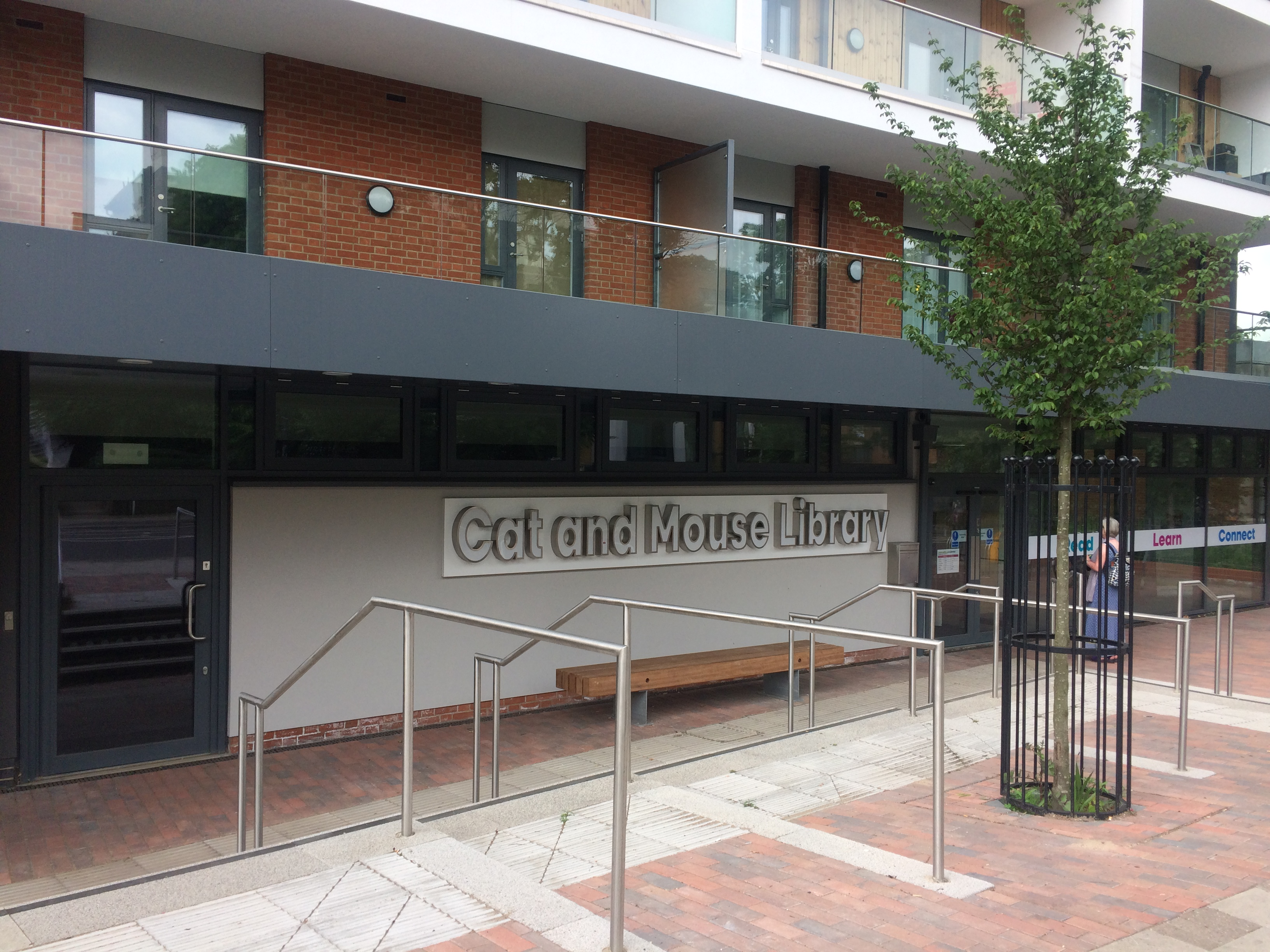
Cat and Mouse Library

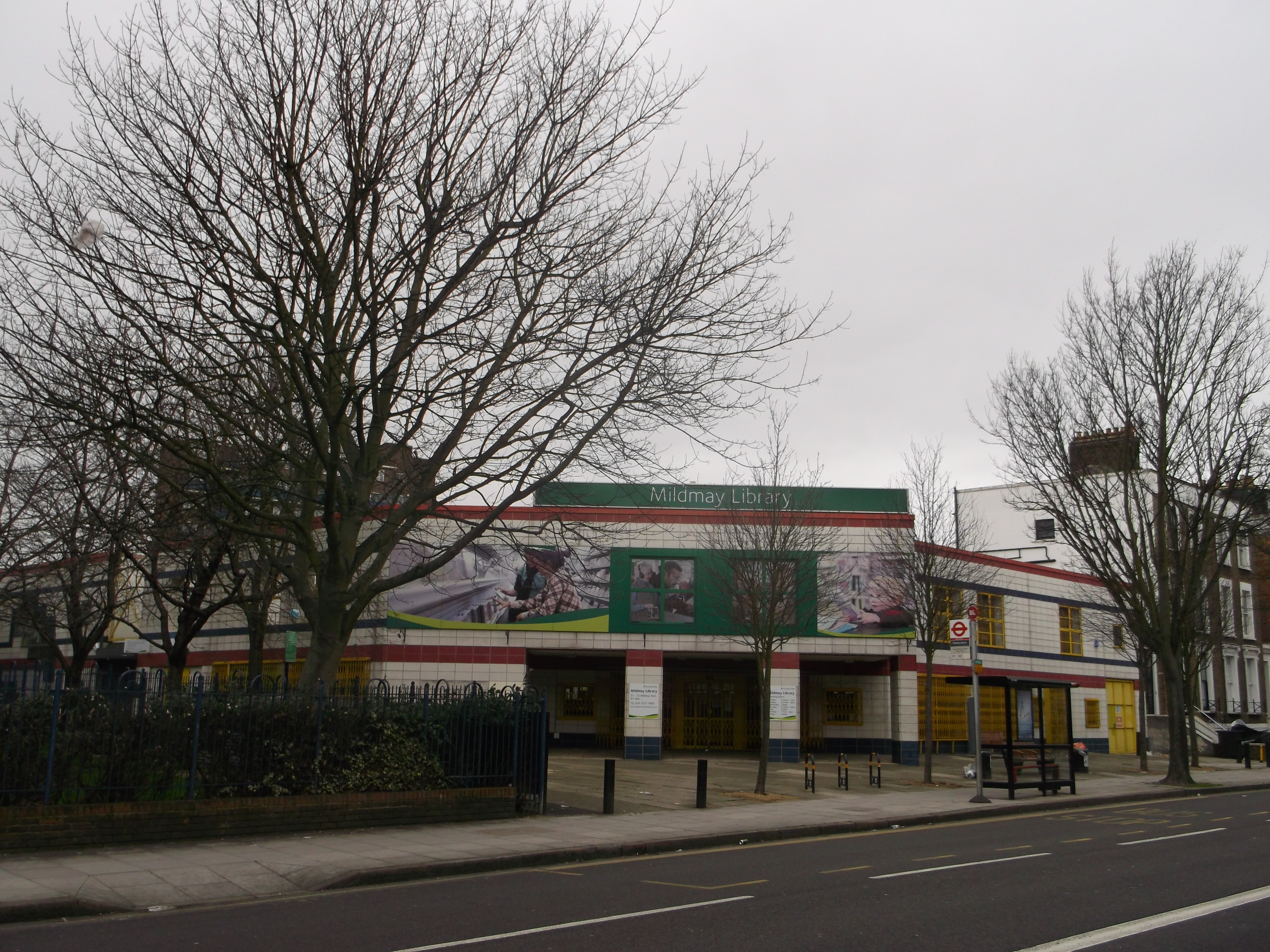
Mildmay Library

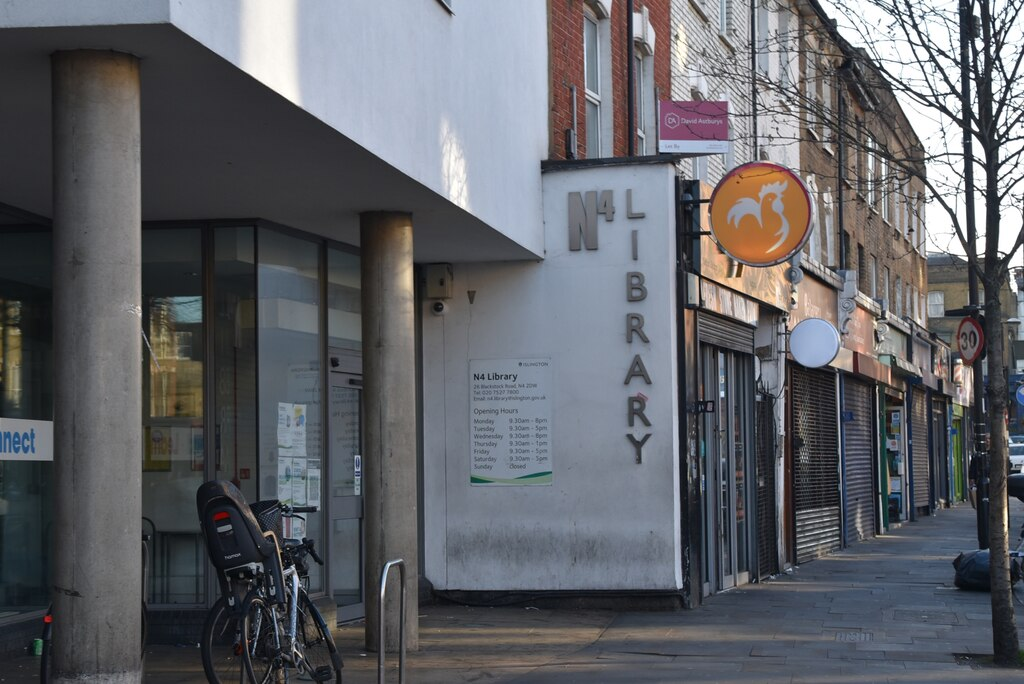
N4 Library

=== Past branches ===
- St Luke's Library, designed by Carl Franck, and originally opened in 1962. The branch closed in 1997.
- John Barnes Library, which was replaced by the Cat and Mouse Library. The library had been named after Councillor John Barnes.

== Influence on public library design and management ==
Since its founding, the library service and its staff have played a key role in defining the modern public library, incorporating and advocating for open-access shelving, more gender-equal employment, children's libraries, and getting rid of late fines on books. In particular, two Chief Librarians of the service became giants of their field: James Duff Brown and Leonard Montague Harrod.

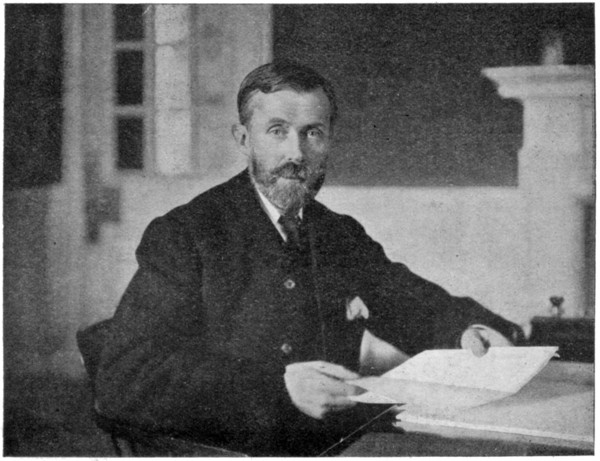
James Duff Brown, the first Chief Librarian of the Borough

The first Chief Librarian of the Borough (1904-1914), James Duff Brown is perhaps most famous for the at-the-time radical and polemic choice of adopting open-shelving, and his novel associated classification scheme. These practices were initially criticized for being "an incitement to chaos, crime and inappropriate fraternisation," but gradually spread to become a defining feature of the modern British library. In a 1908 lecture, James Duff Brown noted that:

"The libraries which have adopted this system are very much used, and one of them, the North Islington Branch, circulates more books annually than many considerable provincial towns. The dangers of admitting the public to their own books have been greatly exaggerated, and the experience of all the existing open-access libraries is that losses and misplacements are insignificant; while the borrowers have improved greatly in intelligence and ability to handle and select books."

Plans for the West Library by Hare, showing open access shelving

Brown was inspired to adopt open-shelving systems after attending the International Congress of Librarians in Chicago and, on the way, seeing it in operation in Boston, Buffalo, Cleveland, and Pawtucket. He was also inspired by American libraries to hire more female employees, and have dedicated children's spaces. Under his guidance, the library system was deeply popular, and he was invited by the Belgian Government to lecture in Brussels and Antwerp on British municipal libraries -- the first time an English librarian had been invited to give such a lecture on the Continent. He closed his speech by noting that British municipal libraries deserved recognition for the "popularising of the book as a vehicle for conveying instruction, amusement, and conserving record." Beyond lectures, Brown penned a number of articles and books on library design; his influence persisted after his death through the work of his nephew, James Douglas Stewart.

Olive Clark, an early Islington Library Assistant, was an influential figure in trying to achieve more equal access to employment opportunities for women in public libraries. She helped form a committee of women librarians across Britain, and provided an "admirable address" in 1915 that argued that many female employees were "as keen and enthusiastic as any of their male colleagues, and fully qualified."

Leonard Montague Harrod served as Chief Librarian from 1940-1954. His most influential work, the Librarian's Glossary of Terms, is still in print and a reference today, with the 10th edition containing more than 10,200 terms.

In 2023, Islington Council's decision to end library late fines made it the third London council to do so, and was widely reported in media. As of mid-2024, 70 out of 202 library services in the UK had become fine-free, up from around 30 in 2018.

An early edition of James Duff Brown's Manual of Library Economy

=== Selected works ===
- 1903: Manual of Library Economy, by James Duff Brown. [7 later eds.]
- 1906: Subject Classification, by James Duff Brown [1st ed. 1906; 2nd ed. 1914; 3rd ed. (rev. by J. D. Stewart) 1939]
- 1907: The Small Library: a guide to the collection and care of books, by James Duff Brown
- 1910: How to use a library: practical advice to students and general readers, with explanations of library catalogues, a systematic description of guides to books, and a guide to special libraries, by James Douglas Stewart
- 1911: Manual of Library Bookbinding Practical and Historical, by Henry Thomas Coutts (a Branch Librarian and President of the Library Assistants' Association) and George Arthur Stephen (a Librarian at the St. Pancras Public Libraries)
- 1912: Manual of Library Classification and Cataloguing, by James Duff Brown
- 1914: Library jokes and jottings; a collection of stories partly wise but mostly otherwise, by Henry Thomas Coutts
- 1915: Open access libraries, their planning, equipment and organisation (1915), planned by James Duff Brown, and written by a number of Islington Libraries staff: James Douglas Stewart, Olive Clarke, Henry Thomas Coutts, Alice Jones, and William McGill
- 1938: The Librarians' Glossary of Terms Used in Librarianship, Documentation, and the Book Crafts, by Leonard Montague Harrod [currently in its 10th ed, later eds compiled by Ray Prytherch]
- 1951: The Libraries of Greater London, by Leonard Montague Harrod
- 1986: Streets with a Story: The Book of Islington, by Eric Willats (a Reference Librarian)

=== Awards ===
- In 1966, the library service won the Winston Churchill Award for most enterprising local committee programme for National Library Week.
- In 1982, ex-Chief Librarian Leonard Montague Harrod was awarded the Carey Award by the Society of Indexers, awarded to people "who have performed outstanding services to indexing."
- In 2018, Islington Libraries won a Social Media Award (delivered by the Publicity and Public Relations Group of the CLIP) for its #Islington50s campaign, which sought to engage residents with 1950s book, music, and film recommendations through various social media efforts.
- In 2018, Tony Brown, Islington Council's Library and Heritage Stock and Reader Development Manager, was awarded a British Empire Medal. At that point, Brown had worked in the library service for 38 years, with his first job at the now closed John Barnes Library in Holloway. Upon receiving the award, Brown noted that: "The libraries in Islington are more than just somewhere to borrow books. They are important community hubs, serving as centres of reading, learning, development and a safe space for residents from all walks of life."

== In popular culture ==
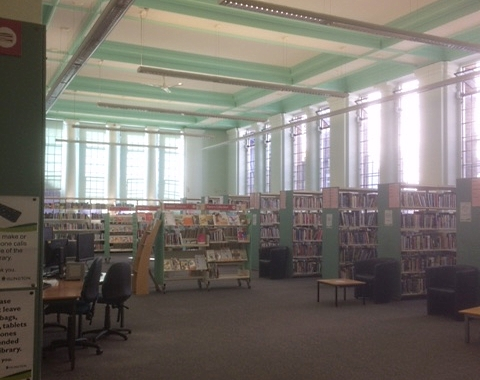
The Central Library Reading Room

- The Central Library was used for the filming of a stop-motion feature film of Lewis Carroll's The Hunting of the Snark (2023). Producer and Director Saranne Bensusan chose the library partly because "it has a high enough ceiling for the lighting of the sets."
- Jermain Jackman was working at Islington Libraries when he won The Voice UK in 2014.
- The West library was used for filming a polling station in the third series of The Crown.
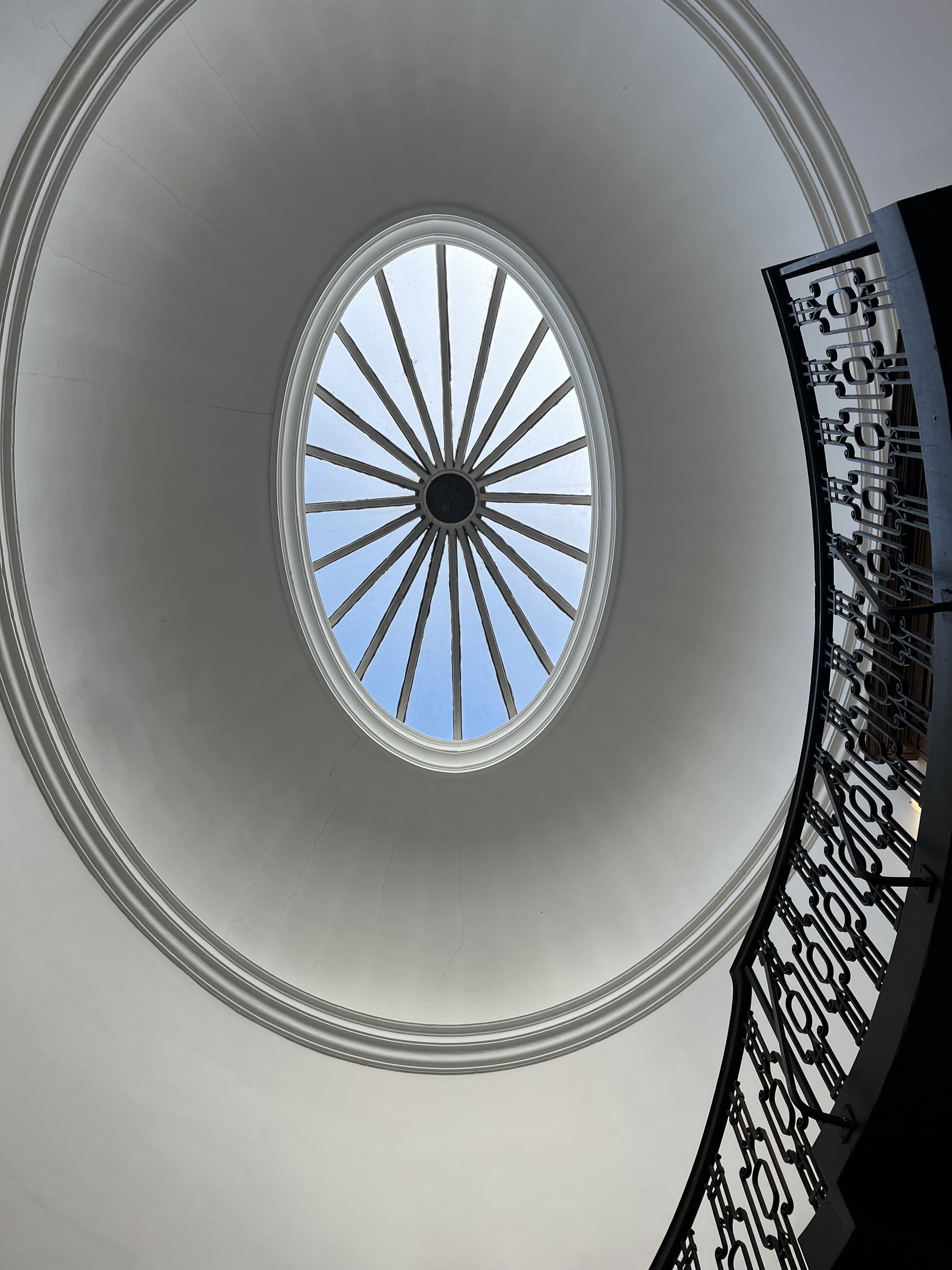
  Staircase in the South Library, one of several historic features
- The South Library was featured in Reading Room, a film by Lucy Harris that explores the "striking features" of the library.
- Author Claire North referenced a number of Islington libraries in her Dear Libraries piece, including the Mildmay, South and Central Libraries. She for example reflected on how her "childhood was ringed by a glorious, shimmering constellation of libraries, from Central Library with its shelves of little guides to big ideas to South Library where the kids sung nursery rhymes every Thursday afternoon, voices bouncing down the stairs."

== See also ==
- Islington Borough Council
- Islington Local History Centre
- James Duff Brown, influential first chief librarian of the service
- Islington Museum
- Islington Central Library
- List of Carnegie Libraries in Europe
- Public libraries in London
