= Archway Library =

Public library in Islington, England

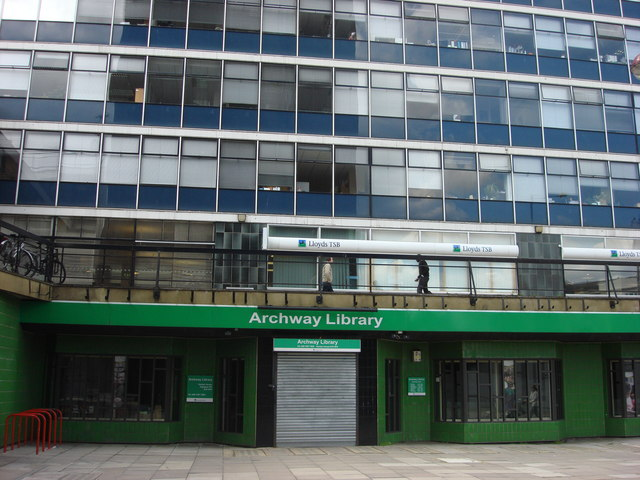
- The library in 2013
- 51.56579°N 0.13556°W
- Location: Archway; London, United Kingdom
- Type: Public library
- Established: originally: 2 November 1946; 80 years ago reopening: 1980
- Branch of: Islington Libraries

Collection
- Size: 23,533

Access and use
- Circulation: 71,647 (2024/25)

Other information
- Director: Cuneyt Yilmaz
- Public transit access: Archway; Upper Holloway
- Website: https://www.islington.gov.uk/libraries-arts-and-heritage/libraries/your-local-libraries/archway-library

The Archway Library is a public library in the London Borough of Islington, England, in the Archway neighborhood.

The library originally opened in 1946, and was the first municipal building in Islington to have fluorescent lighting. A redesigned library opened in 1980. The development at Vorley Road, expected to start in 2027 and finish in 2029, would include the redevelopment of the library.

== History ==
The original library building was opened on 2 November 1946 by Mayor G. W. Riley. It occupied two converted shops, and was the first municipal building in Islington to have fluorescent lighting. At the time, it had around 8,900 adult and children's books.

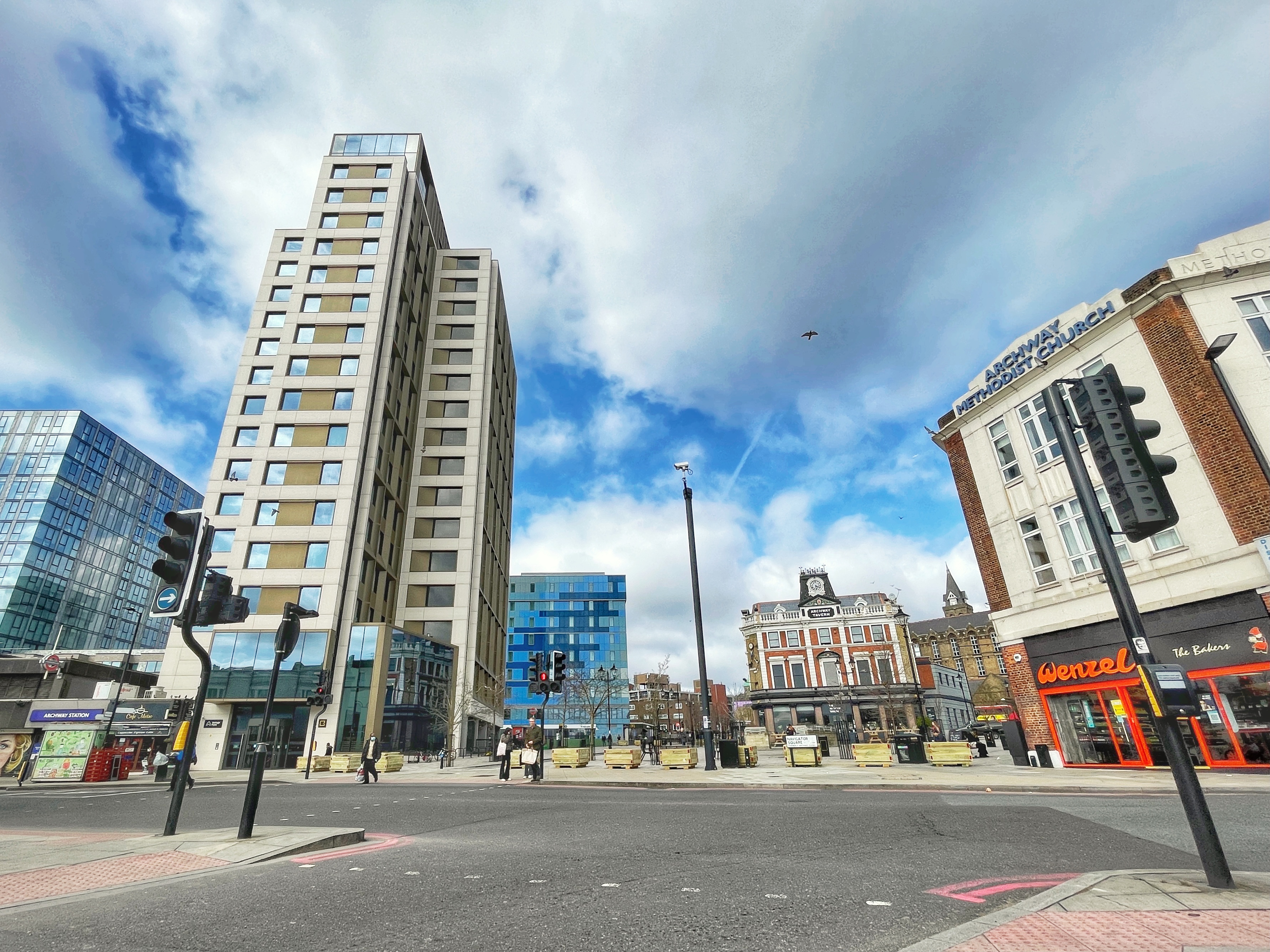
The library is right off from Archway Navigator square

In 1980 this was replaced with a new building at Hamlyn House. The new building was designed by Alfred E. Head, the Islington Borough Architect. In 1983, a dedicated children's section—the Archway Junior Library—was opened by author Grace Hallworth and by Mayor Ted Doveton. The library also made efforts to attract teenagers. Marjorie Eves, the then-librarian noted the building had "one corner" dedicated to younger readers, with more space for magazines, comics and romances.

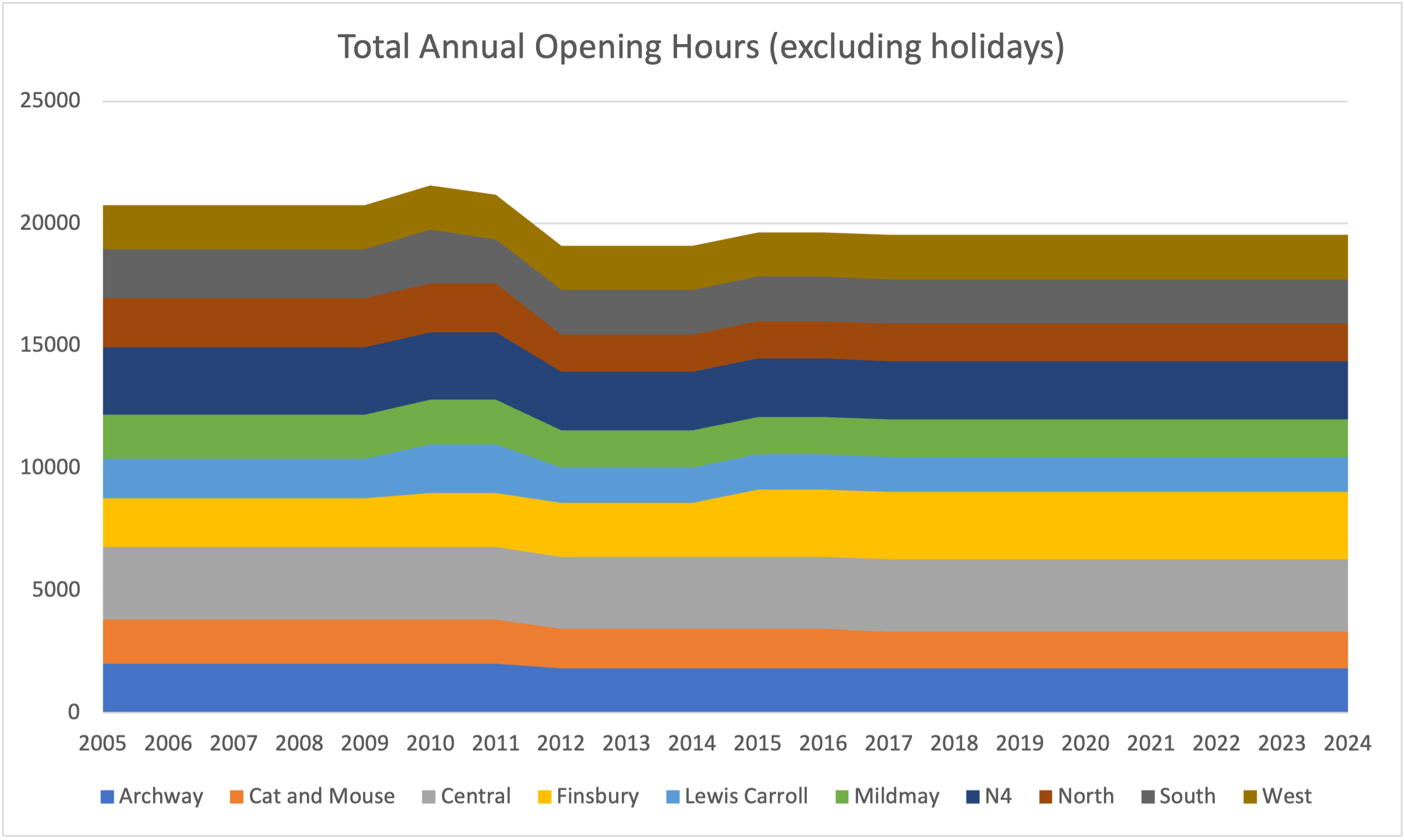
The Archway library saw its opening hours drop by 10% following budget cuts in 2011.

In the context of budget cuts between 2010 and 2014, Archway was one of the few Islington libraries that was not threatened with closure. Following the decision to keep all libraries open, however, the library saw its opening hours drop by about 10% relative to 2010. The library is closed on Tuesdays, Thursdays and Sundays.

In 2025, the children's library re-opened after a refurbishment.

== Proposed redevelopment ==
In 2022, the Islington Council approved plans for the Vorley Road re-development. The plans would see a vacant bus stand and empty offices be re-developed into new homes, as well as a new Archway library, as well as a new medical center, and public realm improvements. The plans would meet high levels of energy efficiency (the "passivhaus" standard). The proposal generated some controversy but only 24 reports opposing the build were filed in the public consultation held in 2022. In September 2025, councillors voted once again to back the scheme in a planning committee, backing a larger scheme from Levitt Bernstein that included taller buildings, with construction to start in 2027 and end in 2029.

In the latest plans, the proposed library would be located on the ground floor (360 square meters) and first floor (419 square meters), in contrast to the current sub-street level. The library would include a large interior staircase, as well as a dedicated elevator.

== Services ==
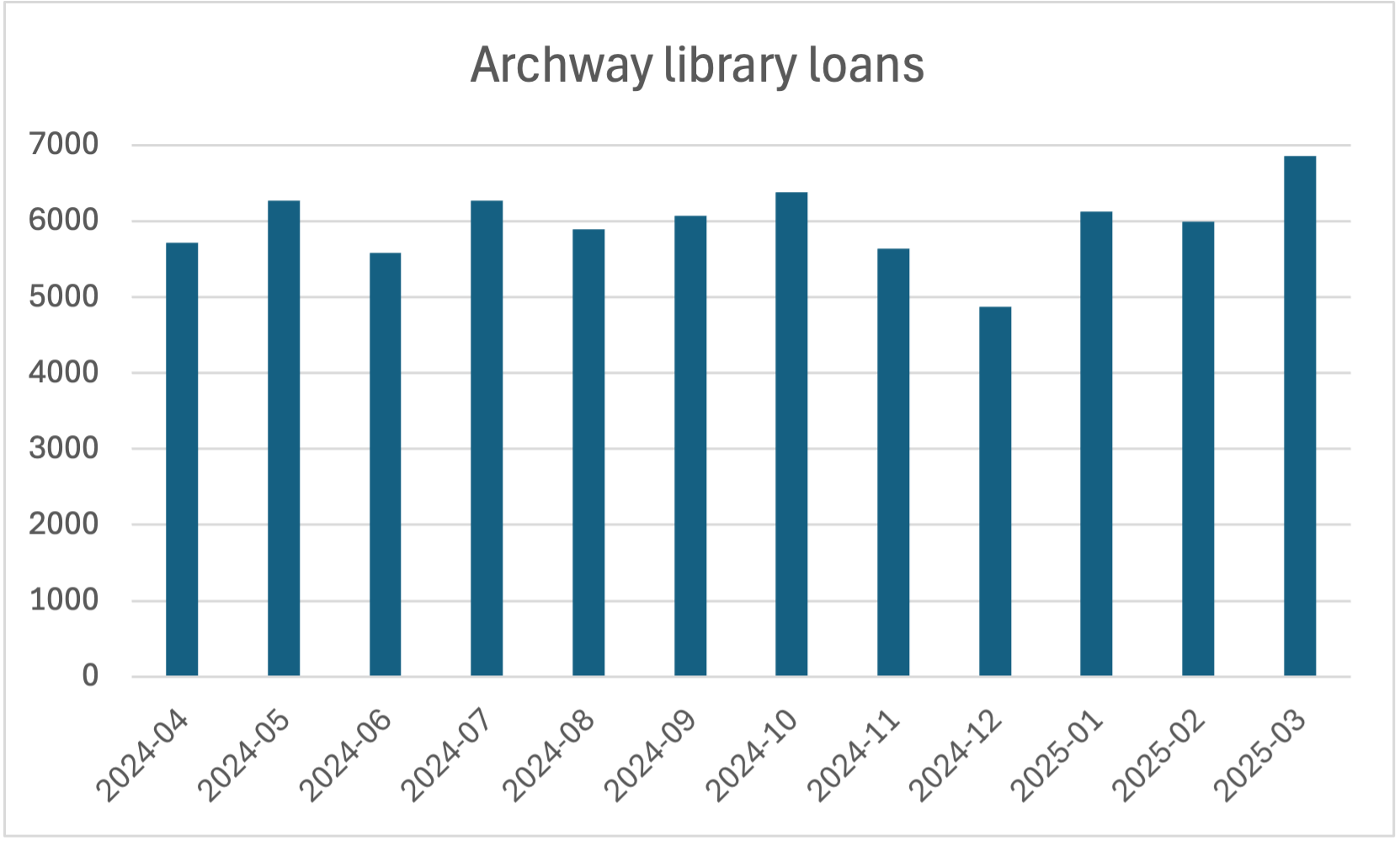
In 2024/25, loans at the library peaked at nearly 7,000 items in March 2025

Archway is one of the most popular libraries in the service. In 2024/25, the library had 3,196 active members (2nd in the service), and 95,079 visits over the year (3rd in the service). On average, it performed 5,970 loans per month (2nd in the service).

On top of serving as a lending library, Archway provides access to 8 free public computers, free wifi, printing facilities, and some study space. The library is fully wheelchair accessible.

The library organizes a number of events. In recent years, these have included a talk on the suffrage movement in Islington, the Archway with Words festival, LGBT month celebrations, and the Archway Lights Festival. In 2024/25, Archway welcomed 5,966 attendees for events – 10% of attendees to all Islington Library events.

== In popular culture ==
- Artist Rowan Durrant produced a piece in his "Superfix" series outside of Archway Library. His "superfixes" are objects that were broken, that Durrant comes in and fixes, and paints a bright orange color. In this case, in 2014, he fixed and painted a bench outside of Archway library. The intention of these projects is to make people more optimistic: "we can all change things."

== See also ==
- Islington Borough Council
- Islington Libraries
- Archway neighborhood
