= Cat and Mouse Library =

Public library in Islington, England

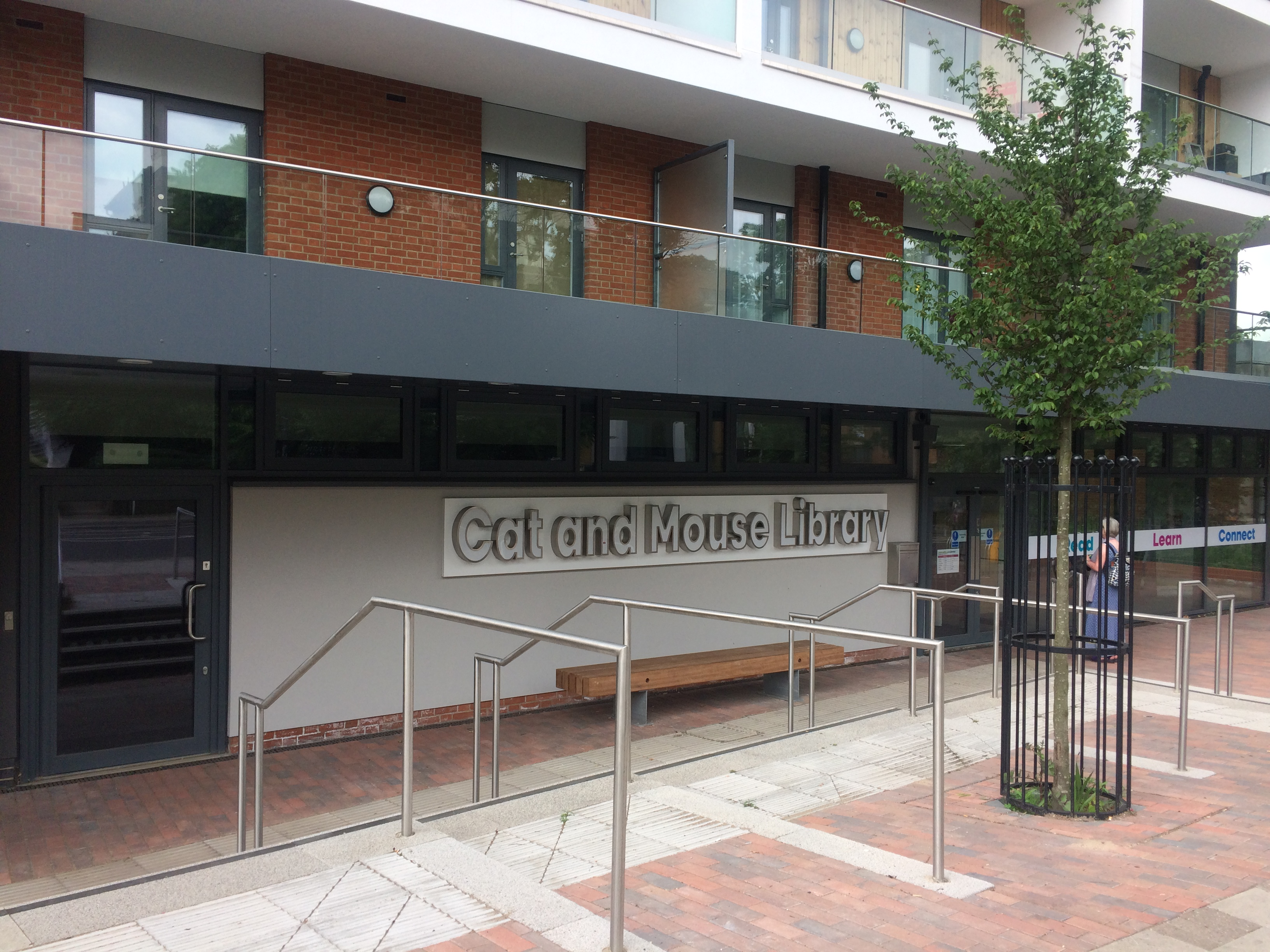
- The library in 2018
- 51.5528°N 0.1248°W
- Location: Camden Road; London, United Kingdom
- Type: Public library
- Established: originally (as John Barnes): 1974 reopening: 2017
- Branch of: Islington Libraries

Collection
- Size: 15,439

Access and use
- Circulation: 26,891 (2024/25)

Other information
- Director: Cuneyt Yilmaz
- Public transit access: Caledonian Road Tufnell Park Caledonian Road & Barnsbury
- Website: https://www.islington.gov.uk/libraries-arts-and-heritage/libraries/your-local-libraries/cat-and-mouse-library

The Cat and Mouse Library is a public library in the London Borough of Islington, England.

The library first opened in 1974 as the John Barnes Library, and then reopened from renovations in 2017 as the Cat and Mouse Library, as the Council redeveloped the Lower Hilldrop estate.

== History ==
The original library at this location, the John Barnes Library opened in 1974. This library was designed by the Borough Architect, Alf Head, with work beginning in 1972.

In the context of budget cuts between 2010-2014, the John Barnes was one of the libraries that was considered for closure. In 2012, it was announced that the library would be rebuilt as part of a redevelopment of the Lower Hilldrop Estate. The library re-opened in December 2017 as the Cat and Mouse Library. This maintained the number of libraries in Islington, bucking a national trend of library closures.

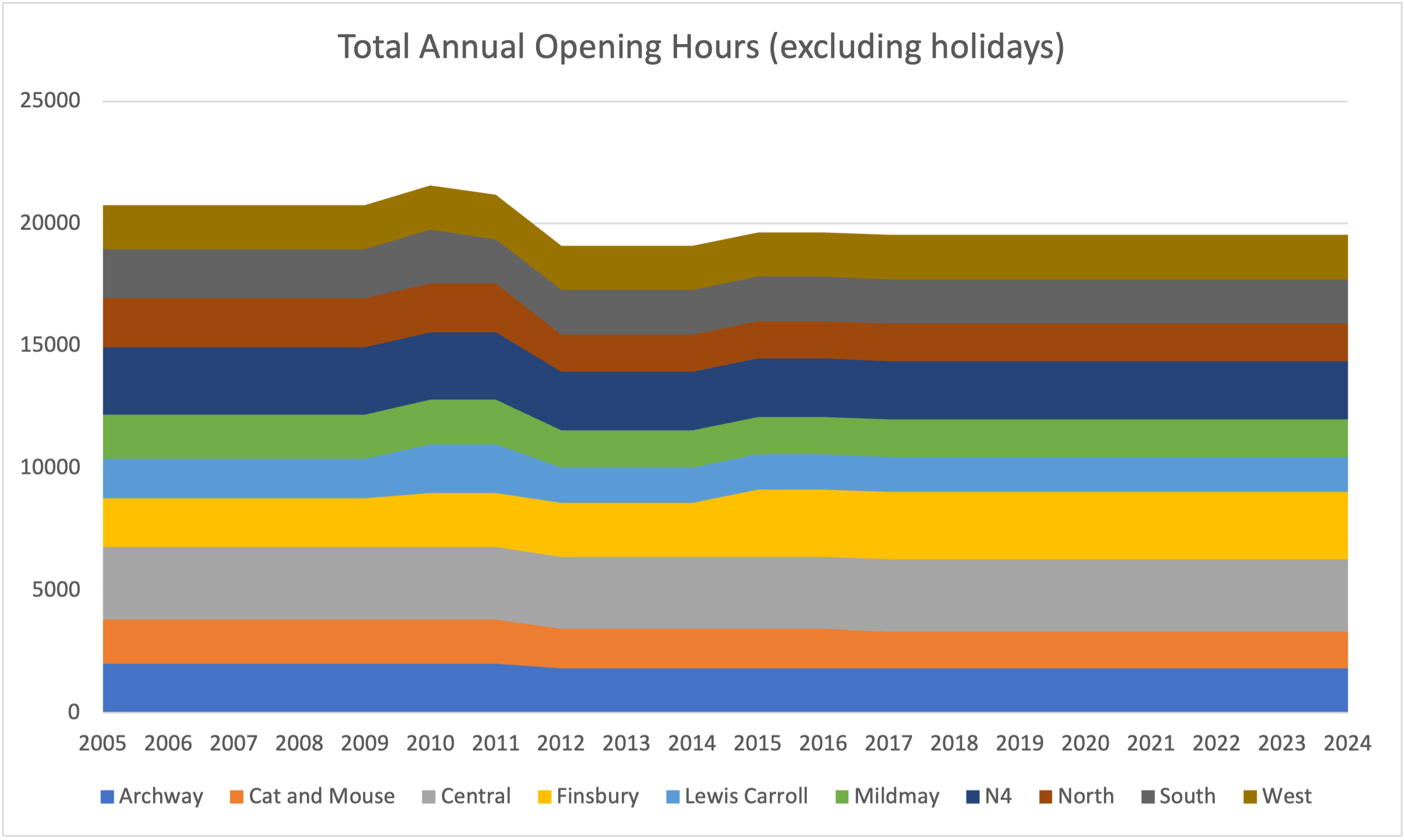
The Cat and Mouse library saw its opening hours drop by 12% following budget cuts in 2011.

The library was named after the so-called "Cat and Mouse Act", and aims to recognize the sacrifices endured by suffragettes imprisoned in Holloway Prison, which used to stand nearby. The Cat and Mouse Act was passed by Parliament as a response to members of the Women's Social and Political Union (WSPU, commonly referred to as suffragettes) using hunger strikes as a form of protest while they were imprisoned. The hunger strikers were force-fed by the prison staff, leading to a public outcry.

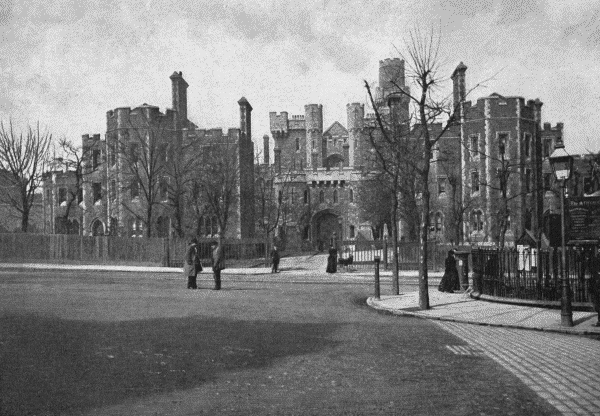
Holloway Prison was located not far from the library's location.

The hours of operation at the new library are about 12% lower than at John Barnes in 2010: in 2024, the Cat and Mouse library was open for a total of 1,504 hours, about half the hours of the Central and Finsbury branches. The library is closed on Mondays, Fridays and Sundays, and only open partially on Wednesdays and Saturdays.

== Services ==
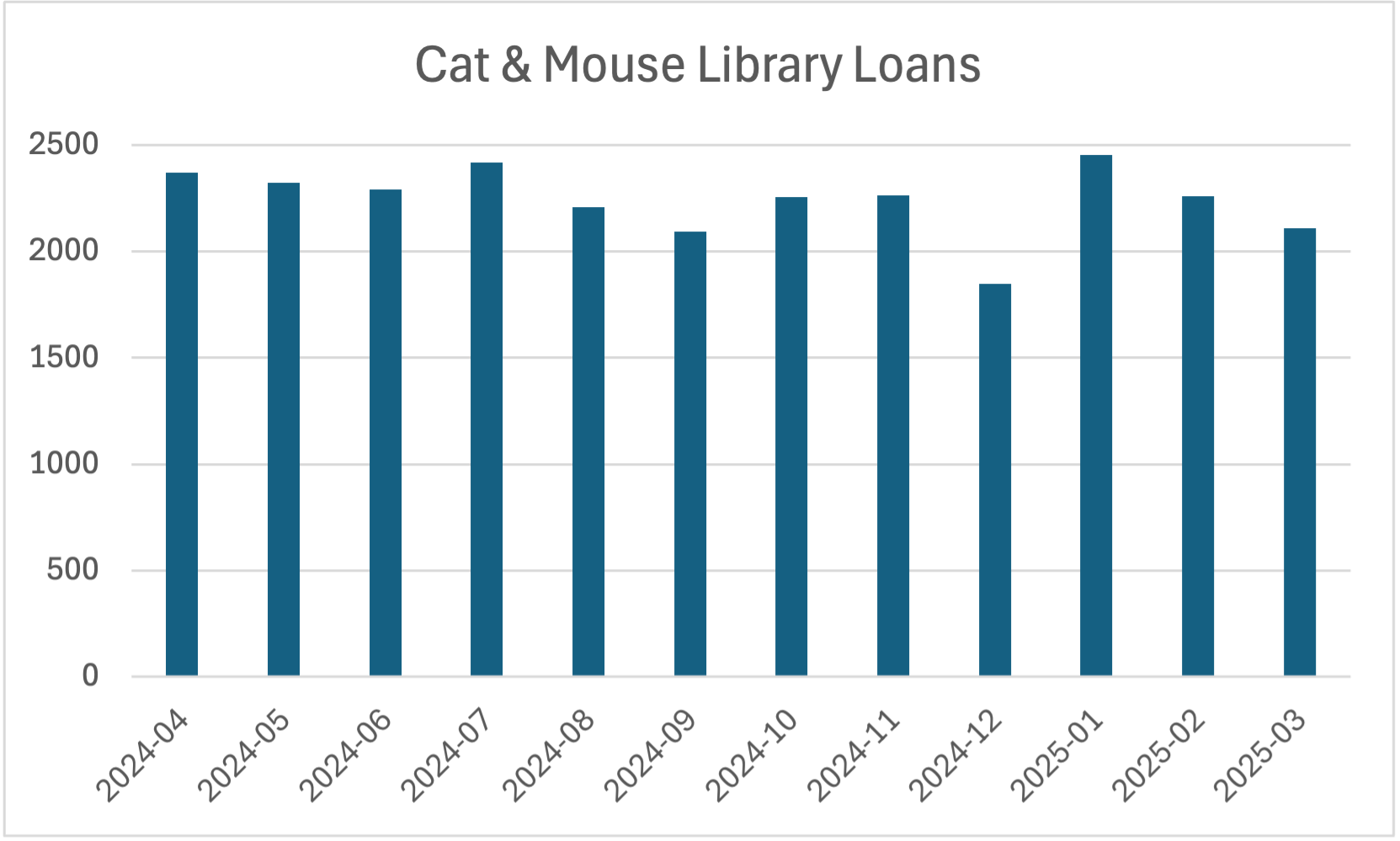
Most of the year, the library loans more than 2,000 items a month

On average, the library performed 2,240 loans per month (9th in the service), with loans seeming to pick up over the school holidays. On top of serving as a lending library, Cat and Mouse provides access to 6 free public computers, free wifi, printing facilities, and some study space.

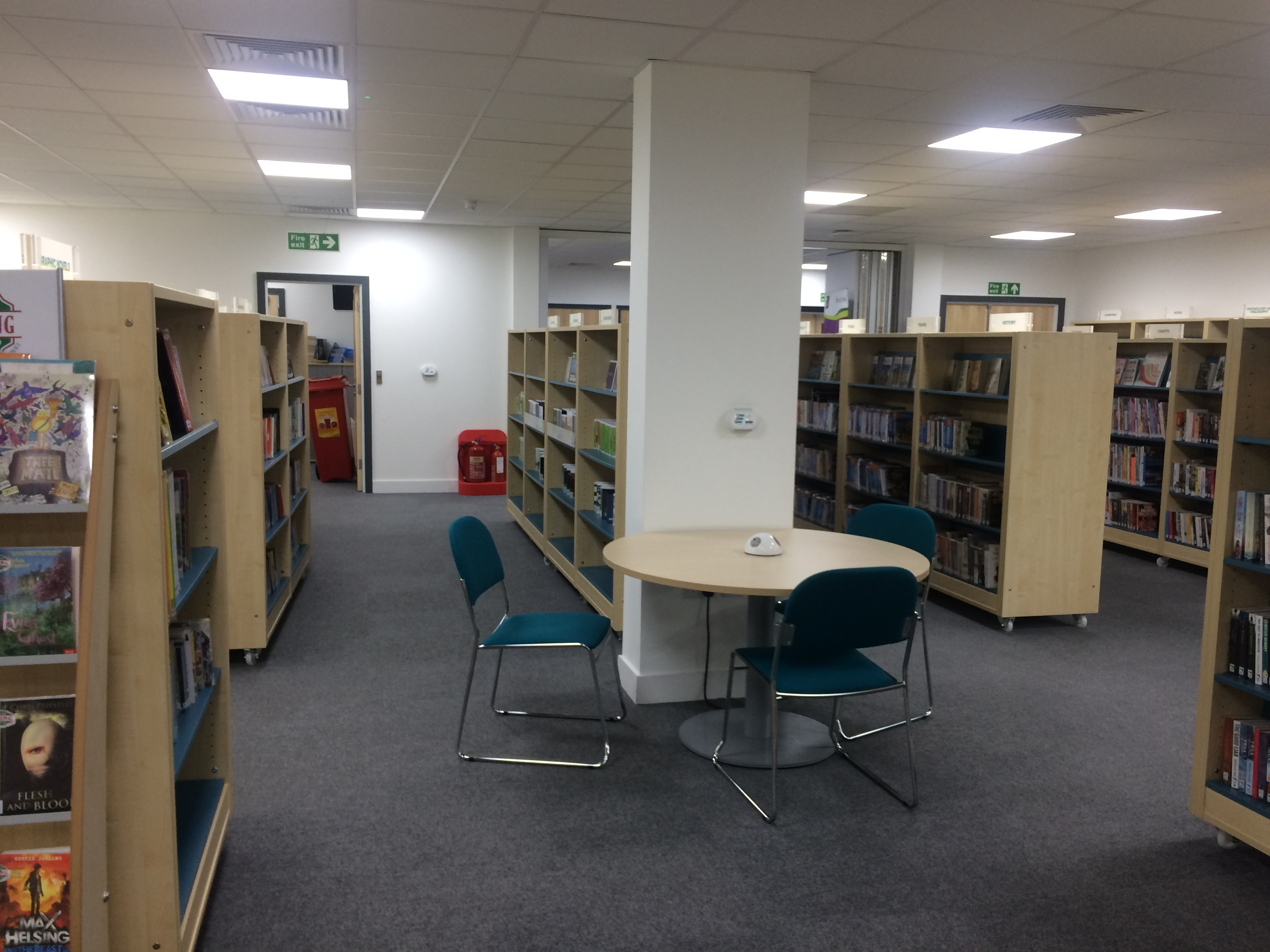
The lending library in 2018

The library organizes a number of events, including English Language and Math classes, and Easy Read, as part of an adult literacy initiative. In 2024/25, Cat and Mouse welcomed 5,258 attendees for events – 8% of attendees to all Islington Library events.

The library is wheelchair accessible, with a ramp.

== See also ==
- Islington Borough Council
- Islington Libraries
- Cat and Mouse Act
