= Lewis Carroll Children's Library =

Public children's library in Islington, England

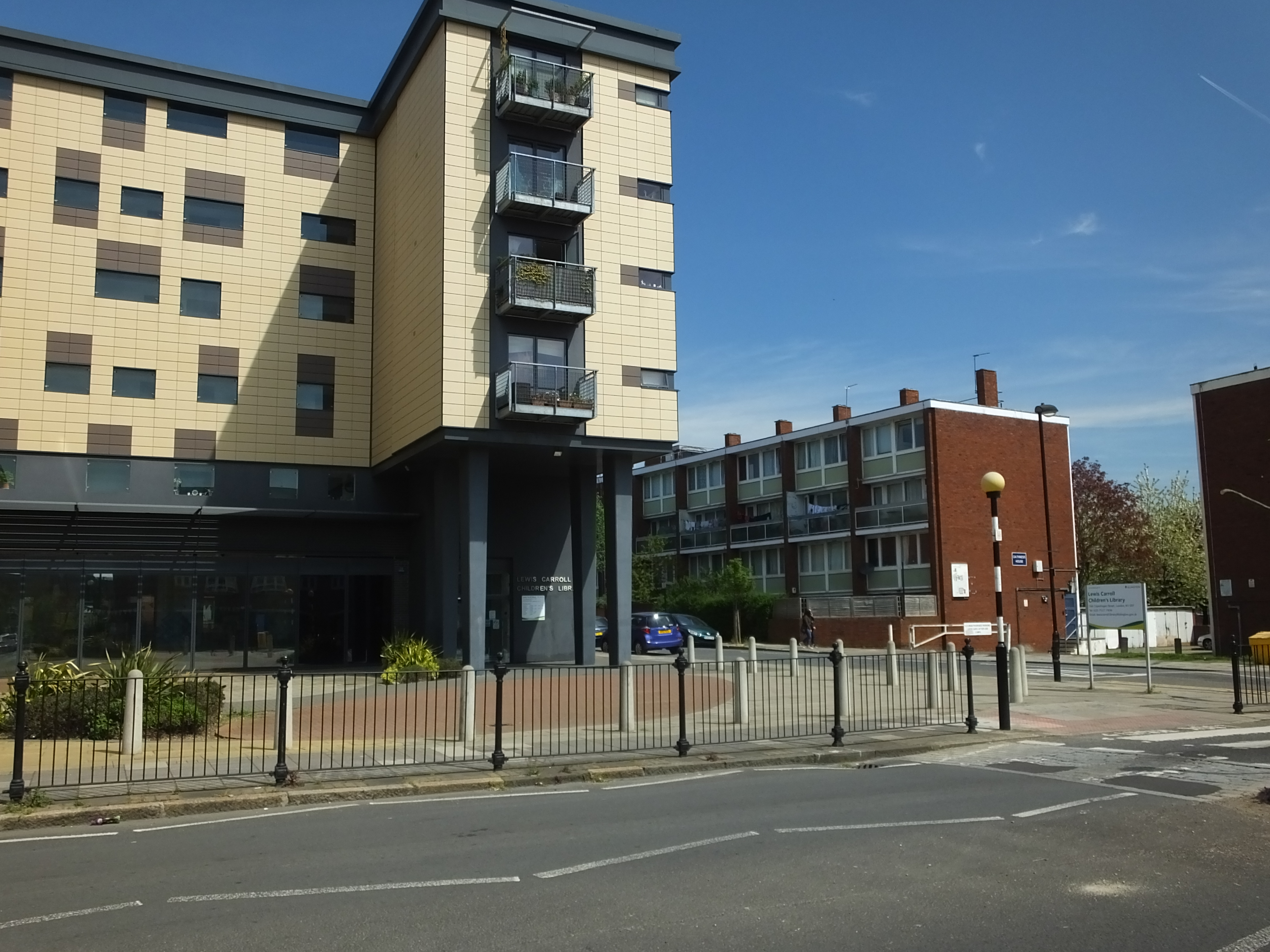
- The library in 2016
- 51.5372°N 0.1190°W
- Location: Copenhagen Street; London, United Kingdom
- Type: Public library Children's library
- Established: 1952
- Branch of: Islington Libraries

Collection
- Size: 6,139

Access and use
- Circulation: 14,805 (2024/25)

Other information
- Director: Jamie Mearns
- Public transit access: King's Cross St Pancras King's Cross St Pancras
- Website: https://www.islington.gov.uk/libraries-arts-and-heritage/libraries/your-local-libraries/lewis-carroll-library

The Lewis Carroll Children's Library is a public library in the London Borough of Islington, England.

The library opened in 1952 as one of the first dedicated children's libraries in London. It reopened from renovations in 2008, and remains the most popular library in Islington for school visits.

== History ==
The Lewis Carroll Children's Library opened originally in 1952. Unlike traditional public libraries, the library maintains a unique access policy requiring adults to be accompanied by a child to enter, ensuring the space remains dedicated to its young users.

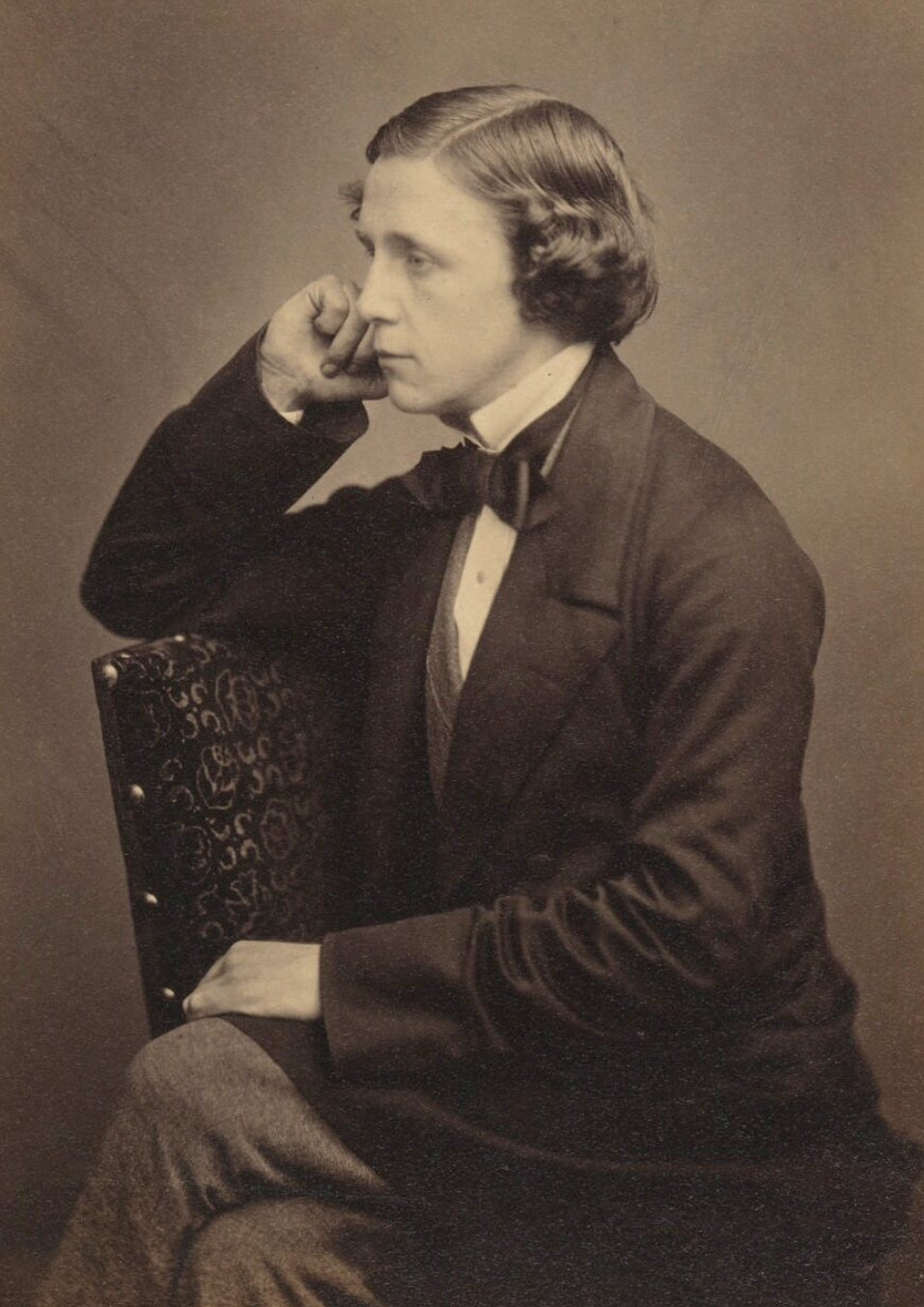
The library is named after author Lewis Carroll

The library is named after English author, poet and mathematician Lewis Carroll, most famous for Alice's Adventures in Wonderland (1865), and its sequel Through the Looking-Glass (1871). In 2008, the library re-opened from renovations; it now has murals inspired by Carroll's character of Alice, and her adventures.

In the context of budget cuts between 2010-2014, Lewis Caroll was one of the libraries that was considered for closure. In the end, the library saw its annual opening hours cut by around 12% relative to 2010. In 2024, Lewis Caroll was open for a total of 1,426 hours, about half the hours of the Central and Finsbury branches. The library is closed on Tuesdays, Thursdays and Sundays, and only open partially on Fridays and Saturdays.

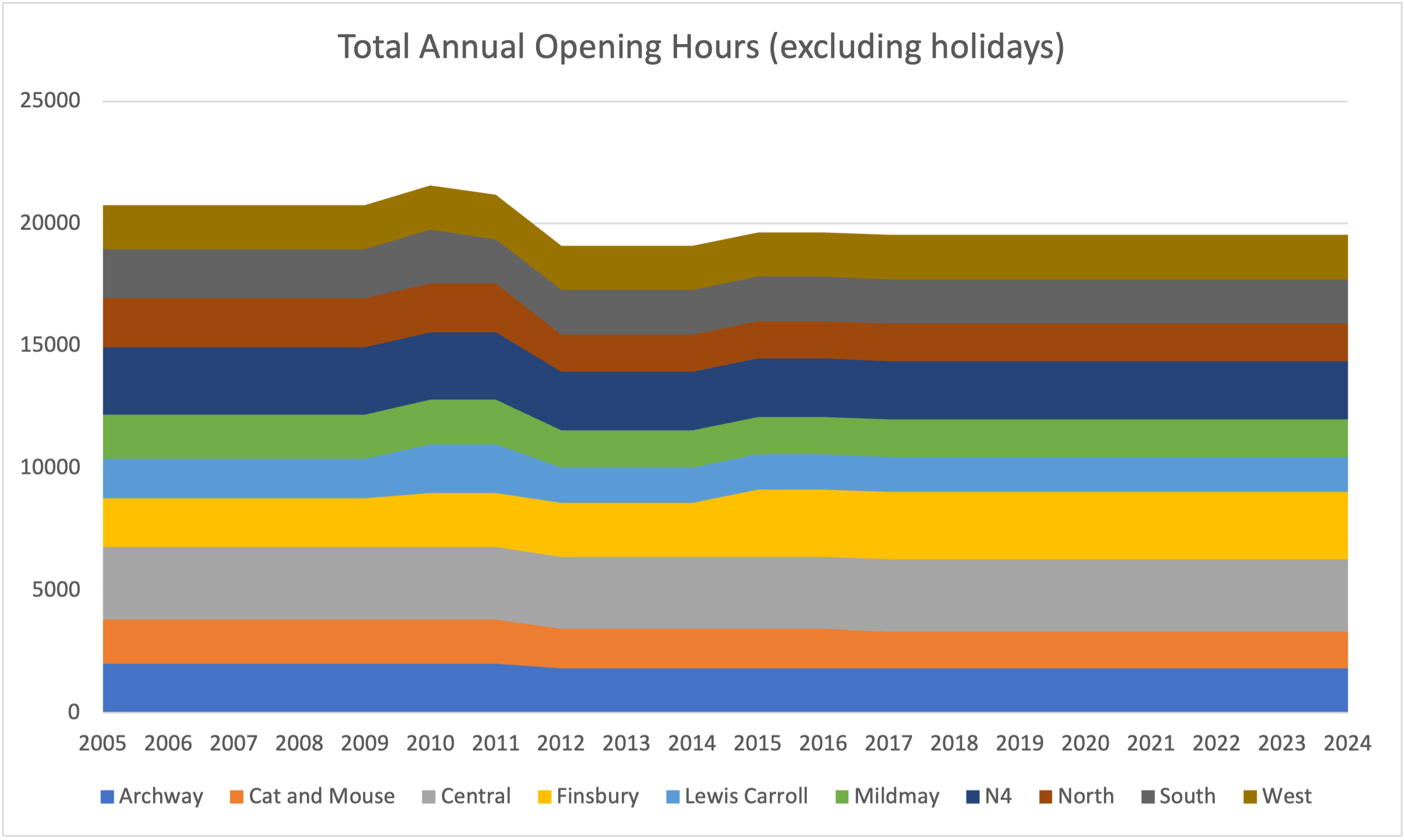
Lewis Caroll library saw its opening hours drop by 12% following budget cuts in 2011.

In 2018, Lewis Carroll Library manager Adenike Johnson reflected that:

"People are really isolated, especially old people, so libraries are their lifeline. In my library we have an exhaustive list of things for the community, from dance classes and live music once a month, to children’s clubs, writing classes, dominoes, baby bounce, cooking and taekwondo – there’s more to libraries than some people think."

== Services ==
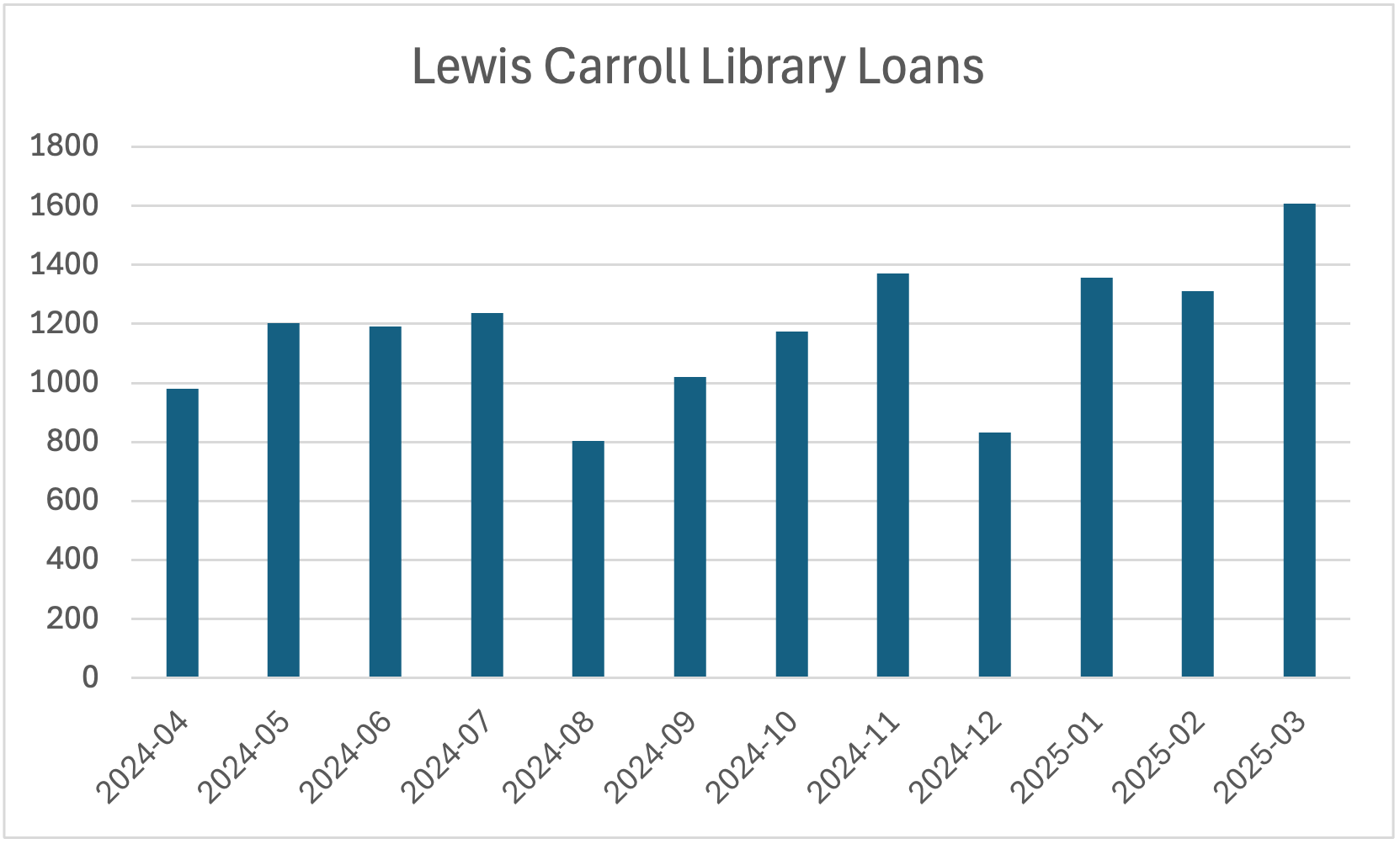
Loans for 2024/25 peaked in March

The library generally has relatively lower levels of engagement than the other libraries in the service. In 2024/25, the Library had 976 active members (last in the service), and 17,905 visits over the year (also last in the service).

On average, it performed 1,174 loans per month (last in the service), with loans seeming to pick up in the run-up to school holidays. On top of serving as a lending library, Lewis Carroll provides access to 4 free public computers, free wifi, printing facilities, and some limited studying space (all for children).

The library organizes a number of events focused on children's literature, including dedicated "BabyBounce" sessions, the ChatterBooks Children's Reading Group, a Lego Club, and a Family Craft Club. The library also hosts events focused on children's literature, ranging from readings with Julia Donaldson (author of The Gruffalo), or performances of Lewis Caroll's own The Hunting of the Snark.

In 2024/25, Lewis Carroll welcomed 3,587 attendees for events – 6% of attendees to all Islington Library events.

The library is wheelchair accessible, with level access throughout.

== See also ==
- Islington Borough Council
- Islington Libraries
- Lewis Carroll
- Children's libraries
