= Islington Museum =

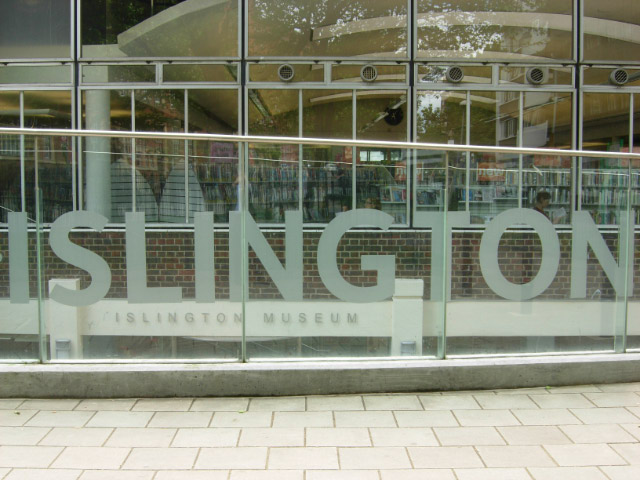
- Islington Museum

- Location within Central London
- Established: 2008; 18 years ago
- Location: Finsbury Library; London, EC1; United Kingdom
- Coordinates: 51.526486°N 0.104553°W
- Type: Local authority museum
- Public transit access: Angel; Farringdon
- Website: Islington Heritage Services

Islington Museum is a public museum dedicated to the history of the London Borough of Islington. It opened in 2008 and covers various themes on local and social history.

== History ==
Islington Museum opened in May 2008, funded by a £1million grant from the Heritage Lottery Fund. The museum, which replaced a previous museum at Islington Town Hall, is owned and operated by Islington Council. It is located in the basement of Finsbury Library.

== Collections ==
The museum houses a gallery covering nine themes on local and social history: childhood, food and drink, fashion, leisure, healthcare, radicals, caring, home and wartime. Amongst the items on display are a bust of Vladimir Lenin, who lived and worked in Clerkenwell, and some of the book covers defaced by Joe Orton and Kenneth Halliwell.

== Exhibitions and events ==
The museum has a regular programme of temporary exhibitions, including visiting displays and displays from its own collections. The museum also hosts talks, walks and children's events. There is also an education room which is used for visits by schools and other groups.

== Admission and access ==
Admission is free. The museum is fully accessible for wheelchair users but there is no accessible parking. An induction loop is available.

== See also ==
- Islington Local History Centre
- Clerk's Well
