= Kenneth Halliwell =

British writer and murderer (1926–1967)

- Halliwell on holiday in Tangier, c. 1967
- Born: Kenneth Leith Halliwell; 23 June 1926; Bebington, Wirral, Cheshire, England
- Died: 9 August 1967 (aged 41); Islington, London, England
- Occupations: Actor, writer, collagist
- Partner: Joe Orton (1951–1967)

Kenneth Leith Halliwell (23 June 1926 – 9 August 1967) was a British actor, writer and collagist. He was the mentor, boyfriend and murderer of playwright Joe Orton.

== Childhood ==
Halliwell was born in Bebington on the Wirral near Liverpool. He was very close to his mother; when he was 11, he witnessed her death from a wasp sting at their family home.

Halliwell was a classics scholar at Wirral Grammar School, where he gained his Higher School Certificate in 1943. Eligible for military service in 1944, he registered as a conscientious objector, and was exempted conditional upon becoming a coal miner. After discharge in 1946, he acted for a time in Scotland and then returned home to act in Birkenhead. His father committed suicide in 1949 by inhaling coal-gas in a gas oven; Halliwell was the first to find the body the following morning, but he "stepped over the body, put the kettle on, made a cup of tea and had a shave" before he reported the death. Halliwell later moved to London to study drama at the Royal Academy of Dramatic Art (RADA), having inherited the family fortune.

== Relationship with Orton ==
In 1951, Halliwell met fellow RADA student Joe Orton. Both men were struggling actors who became struggling writers; their common interests led to a lengthy romantic relationship. Halliwell, in the early years, seems to have been something of a mentor to Orton, who had had a rather cursory education, and helped to mould the writing style that would later be called "Ortonesque". The two men collaborated on several novels, including The Boy Hairdresser, which were not published until after their deaths.

From January 1959, Orton and Halliwell were involved in the theft and defacement of Islington public library books. Halliwell became an illicit collage artist, while Orton wrote the fake blurbs for the flyleaf of the dust jackets. After their trial in 1962 the two men were given custodial sentences: Halliwell was sent to HM Prison Ford at Arundel in Sussex for six months and Orton went to HM Prison Eastchurch at Sheerness in Kent.

Orton's eventual success as a writer, which began not long after their release from prison, put a distance between the two men that Halliwell found difficult to handle. Towards the end of his life, Halliwell was on regular courses of anti-depressants.

== Murder–suicide ==
On 9 August 1967, Halliwell mortally injured Orton with nine hammer blows to the head, then overdosed on pentobarbital (Nembutal) sleeping pills. Halliwell died first. Their bodies were discovered late the following morning, when a chauffeur arrived at the door of their Noel Road flat in Islington to collect Orton for a meeting with director Richard Lester to discuss filming options on Up Against It, an unproduced script by Orton, written in 1967 for the Beatles.

Halliwell's suicide note referred to the contents of Orton's diary as an explanation for his actions:

If you read his diary, all will be explained. KH PS: Especially the latter part.

This is presumed to be a reference to Orton's description of his promiscuity; the diary contains numerous incidents of cottaging in public lavatories and other casual sexual encounters.

== In popular culture ==
In Prick Up Your Ears, the 1987 film based on Orton's life, Halliwell was portrayed by Alfred Molina.

In Fantabulosa!, the 2006 television play about Kenneth Williams, he was portrayed by Ewan Bailey.

British experimental music group Coil recorded three tracks titled "The Halliwell Hammers" for their 1995 album Worship the Glitch. The two primary members of Coil, John Balance and Peter Christopherson, were romantic partners through most of the band's existence, and much of their work was inspired by or dedicated to gay icons and personalities of the past.

Halliwell is the subject of a monologue, Especially The Latter Part, by Richard Ely. It premiered in Lichfield, in 2009.

The stage version of Prick Up Your Ears, written by Simon Bent, opened on the West End in London at the Comedy Theatre on 17 September 2009. Matt Lucas played Halliwell and Chris New played Orton. Con O'Neill took over the role of Halliwell after Lucas pulled out. The play closed on 15 November 2009.

In 2014, a collage by Halliwell was purchased by Islington Museum at auction for £2,800. In 2016 the same museum purchased at auction The Cat Screen, a four-panel described as "an important part of 1960s cultural history as well as an engaging piece of art work", for £8,000.

Orton and Halliwell's relationship and murder–suicide is the subject of Law 46 of Robert Greene's bestselling book The 48 Laws of Power, "Never Appear Too Perfect".

== Works ==
- The Protagonist (circa 1949), unproduced and unpublished play about Edmund Kean.
- The Silver Bucket (1953), The Mechanical Womb (1955), The Last Days of Sodom (1955), novels co-written with Orton, all unpublished and now lost.
- Priapus in the Shrubbery (1959), solo novel, unpublished and now lost.
- Lord Cucumber and The Boy Hairdresser, novels co-written with Orton, published in 2001.
