= Arts and Crafts Society of Victoria =

Australian arts and crafts society 1908–1997

The Arts and Crafts Society of Victoria, established in 1908, promoted decorative arts and crafts in Australia for nearly nine decades before its demise in 1997.

== Inspiration and founding (1907–1908) ==
The Arts and Crafts Society of Victoria drew inspiration from the British Arts and Crafts movement of the late 19th and early 20th centuries. A crucial catalyst for its formation was the First Australian Exhibition of Women's Work, held at the Exhibition Building, Melbourne, from 23 October to 30 November 1907, which showcased excellent handicrafts but revealed a weakness in design indicating opportunity for further development, and thus the need for a permanent organisation to support and promote craft work in Victoria. Directing artistic efforts towards practical and useful articles and to raise standards of craft to a professional level were considered primary aims.

The society was officially founded in 1908 at the studio of Bertha Merfield, a prominent painter and craft worker, at 46 Collins Street, Melbourne, at which architect Robert Joseph Haddon explained the society's aims and objectives and became the founding vice-president. Margaret Jane (née Stuart-Wortley), Lady Talbot, wife of Governor of Victoria Sir Reginald Arthur James Talbot, was the society's first president for its early meetings, before she was replaced in July 1908 by the wife of the next governor.

== Early years (1908–1920) ==
The first official meeting of the Arts and Crafts Society of Victoria took place on May 27, 1908, at the Austral Salon in Little Flinders Street, Melbourne, a club that was established in 1890 for women interested in the fine arts. Primary objectives were declared to be the encouragement of the production and exhibition of local arts and crafts, and to promote the use of Australian materials and motifs in work and design; stylised gum-nut and gum-leaves appeared on the cover of the Society's Official Catalogue of the First Annual Exhibition of Works, in the Guild Hall, Melbourne, the first of its annual exhibitions, 2–12 December 1908, at which Suzanne Gether exhibited and gave demonstrations of handloom weaving.

The society quickly gained momentum, attracting over 100 members shortly after its formation and establishing its clubrooms at 357 Collins Street. At the time of its first exhibition, "Under The Patronage of His Excellency Sir Thomas Gibson Carmichael, Governor of Victoria", office bearers were: Lady Gibson Carmichael, President; Mrs. Creswell and Robert. J. Haddon, Vice-Presidents; Mrs. George Box Honorary Treasurer; and Miss M. E. Chomley, Honorary Secretary. Its council members were: Rodney Alsop, W. A. M. Blackett, E. Royston Bradshaw, Walter Butler, Margaret Chapman, F. A. Campbell, Auguste Fischer, J. R. Tranthim-Fryer, Vida Goldstein, Mrs E. L. MacGeorge, Bertha Merfield, J. M. Joshua, Mrs. Donald Mackinnon, Mrs. Edward Miller, F. Newman, Mrs. William Smith, R. H. Stockfeld, P. M. Carew-Smyth, Guy Sherwood, Blamire Young, Mabel Young, and representatives of technical schools J. S. Davie, W. Westwood, J. Little, and A. E. Anderson.

This first exhibition displayed bookbinding, cabinet-making and carving; ceramics; drawing, design, and painting; etchings; glass; leather; needlework; photography; sculpture and modelling; artificial flowers, weaving; basketry; work from the Tasmanian Arts and Crafts Society; and rooms with loan collections of vintage European and eighteenth-century crafts.

== Growth and development (1920–1950) ==
Ella O'Connell secretary of the Arts and Crafts Society of Victoria in an exhibition of Michael O'Connell printed fabrics. Australian Home Beautiful, 2 November 1931, p13

Poster for Arts and Crafts Society of Victoria, Annual Exhibition 1932

During this period when its meetings had been held at the Lyceum Club, from July 1926 the society operated from rooms at the Causeway Corner, at 323 Bourke Street, and held exhibitions at the Melbourne Town Hall.

The organisation attracted artists, craftspeople, and influential figures: Walter Baldwin Spencer, president from 1 June 1914, an advocate for the study of aboriginal art; Frances Derham, who from 1928 to 1932 was president and on 28 June 1929 addressed the Society of Arts and Crafts of Victoria, Melbourne, on ‘The Interest of Aboriginal Art to the Modern Designer’; William Arthur Mordey Blackett, who served as president until 1949; Michael O'Connell a council member in the 1920s and 1930s whose partner Ella Moody, though not a craft practitioner, was Secretary of the Arts and Crafts Society of Victoria from 1928 to 1931; Eveline Winifred Syme, a painter and printmaker who held exhibitions with the society; and Frederick Charles Cecil Ward, a furniture designer who exhibited with the society in the 1930s. Other members included printmaker Dorrit Black, bookbinder Margaret Chapman, painter Helen Ogilvie, jeweller Kate Durham, textile artist Annia Castan, and sculptor Leopoldine Mimovich.

Dorrit Black (c.1939–1941) The wool quilt makers, linocut, printed in colour, from five blocks

Under the auspices of the Society, and at the behest of members, the printmakers Ethel Spowers and Eveline Syme, Australian gallery manager of London's The Redfern Gallery, Clarice Zander in 1933 brought out the Exhibition of British Contemporary Art with linocuts by Claude Flight, Cyril Power, Sybil Andrews and Lill Tschudi, which George Bell praised as "the exhibition's highlight", for their "vitality and creative force."

== Publications ==
The Recorder, the first official publication of the society, was first issued in March 1929, discontinued in October 1933, then replaced by the Quarterly Bulletin (1962–1968), and Craftlink (from 1981). The Recorder was open to modernist sensibilities, as well as promoting the use of Australian motifs in design and decoration.

== Post-war era and later (1950–1997) ==
The society in the post-war period continued as a community of artisans and designers promoting Australian materials and motifs in design, and which enabled craftspeople to exhibit and sell their work. It played a role in fostering the development of technical education in Victoria. Joan à Beckett Lindsay, author and artist served as president from 1958 to 1964, and Frances Mary Burke, textile designer was president from 1968 to 1971.

Another significant member was Harold Randolph Hughan, potter and member since 1949, later appointed MBE in 1978, who in 1964 attended, as representative of the Society, the first congress of the World Crafts Council in America, with Mollie Douglas from the Potters Society of New South Wales, Anita Aarons from Caulfield Technical College, and Narelle Townsend, a Sydney architect working in New York City. There having been limited communication between craftspeople in different states of Australia, the Congress initiated a dialogue that resolved in the founding of the Craft Council of Australia in 1971, and to Australian sculptor Marea Gazzard being nominated President of the world organisation (1980 to 1984).

From 1964 the address of the Society was 313-315 Little Collins St, Melbourne; then from 1967 it moved to 2 Crossley St.; from 1980, 99 Cardigan St. Carlton; and from 1981, Hardware St, Melbourne. It operated until 1997 as the Meat Market Craft Centre with a shop and permanent displays of Australian crafts with occasional special exhibitions, such as the Society's seventy-fifth anniversary exhibition A Show of Hands was held in 1983.

== Presidents ==
- 1908–1927: John Robertson Tranthim-Fryer
- 1927–1949: William Arthur Mordey Blackett
- 1949–c.1957: Alice Crossland Dixon (née Brooksbank), wife of Sir Owen Dixon
- 1958–1964: Joan à Beckett Lindsay
- 1964–1968: Gladys Godfrey (née Race)
- 1968–1971: Frances Mary Burke
