= Frances Mary Burke =

(1904–1994) textile designer and homeware retailer

Frances Mary Burke MBE
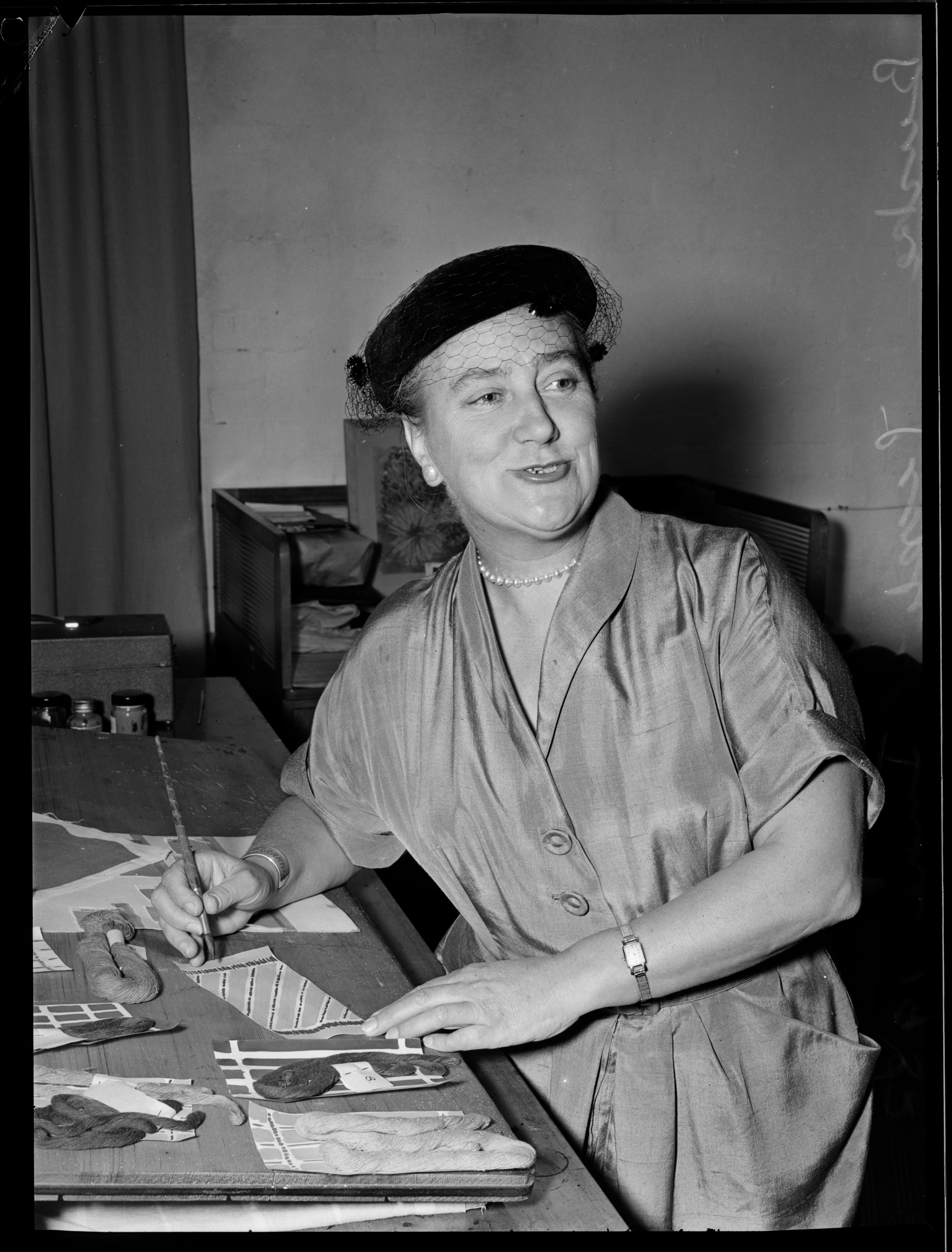
- Frances Burke Australian textile designer, 3 June 1952, by Gordon F. De Lisle
- Born: 10 January 1904; Spotswood, Victoria, Australia
- Died: 14 October 1994 (aged 90); Kew, Victoria, Australia
- Education: National Gallery of Victoria Art School; Royal Melbourne Institute of Technology University (RMIT)
- Known for: her contribution to development of printed textile design in Australia
- Elected: Contemporary Art Society (Vic); Society of Designers; Arts and Crafts Society of Victoria

Frances Mary Burke MBE (10 January 1904 – 14 October 1994) was an Australian artist. She holds a significant place in the development of Australian design and evolution of printed textile design in Australia. She is recognised not only as a textile designer, but also as a design activist, homeware retailer, manufacturer and business woman.

== Biography ==
Frances Mary Burke was born in Spotswood, Victoria on 10 January 1904. She was the youngest of three children of Francis Henry Burke, tailor's presser, and his wife Frances Veronica, née Brown, a former tailoress. Before taking up the opportunity to train in art and design, Burke had been a nurse at Mount St Evin's and Homoeopathic hospitals, qualifying as a registered nurse in 1927. By the early 1930s she was living with fellow nurse Frances Mary (Fabie) Chamberlin who was to remain her life partner and business partner.

A small inheritance on the early death of her mother enabled Burke to leave her nursing vocation and follow her passion for art. Burke studied art at the National Gallery of Victoria school of drawing and at the Melbourne Technical College (now Royal Melbourne Institute of Technology). Michael O'Connell was a great influence and he encouraged her enthusiasm for fabric printing. Burke was awarded scholarships in 1934, 1935 and 1936. In 1936 she attended George Bell’s art school, training with Russell Drysdale, Peter Purves Smith and life-long friend Maie Casey, later Baroness Casey and Vicereine of Bengal. Burke had gone on to design some of her first patterns after viewing the artworks of Margaret Preston at the Museum of Victoria.

Her design career started while she was still a student when she showed Pierre Fornari, fashion director of Georges, a prestigious department store in Melbourne, some of her designs..He had expressed his dissatisfaction with the 'lack of fashion textiles produced in Australia with an Australian character'. He was impressed with her original Australian-themed designs influenced by Australian artefacts she had seen in museums, and Fornari commissioned her to designs fabrics suitable for clothing for the fast emerging demand casual wear. Burke founded Burway Prints which specialised in print fabrics with fellow Melbourne Technical College graduate Maurice Holloway. While Burke designed, Holloway took charge of printing. Burway Prints was Australia’s first registered textile screen printmaking business.

As early as 1938 her designs were being acknowledged as "an inspiration to all lovers of Australia nature". The Melbourne Age social column described her designs, on show at the 1938 Arts and Crafts exhibition. Designs included the use of 'the vivid red waratah, a flower that adapts itself very well to the conventional designs, the banksia (or bottle brush), West Australian flannel flowers and the wattle in some most original patterns'. The writer concluded that the designs were "distinct and unusual" and advocated readers to support Australian designs and to consider putting "native designs" in domestic interiors, especially when they were so attractive.

With the limited supply of imported fabrics, Burke's career took off during World War II. One of Burke's most popular designs was the "Tiger Stripe" design, with a singular horizontal, curvilinear motif. It was originally created for author Joan Lindsay, and an example of this design can be viewed in the e-gallery below in the collection of the Museum of Applied Arts and Sciences. In 1944 Burke was commissioned by Maie Casey to create the Indian-inspired design "Bengal Tiger" for Casey to wear and she was photographed wearing her ensemble by Cecil Beaton.

In 1942 Burke established the new firm of Frances Burke Fabrics Pty Ltd with business and life partner Fabie Chamberlin. The collection featured some of the best of post-war design and production methods. In the same year, Burke was commissioned to design fabrics for the new Australian Embassy in Washington. Burke opened her shop NEW Design Pty Ltd in 1948 in Melbourne, and the business operated in various locations until 1967. The shop stocked furnishings, fabrics, and domestic utensils designed in a Modernist style, and also showcased furniture by noted Melbourne designers Clement Meadmore and Grant Featherston.

In 1949, Burke felt the need to be "refreshed" and headed for a three month research tour of the United States. Burke travelled in her capacity as a member of the Provisional Council of Industrial Design as well as a designer of noted furnishing textiles. She went with the intention of acquiring the skills to stimulate Australian manufacturers' enterprise and production with new ideas. One of her main areas of interest was examining the way colour was used by American designers, including the use of colour in America to prevent accidents in workshops. On her return, "she had much to tell of the scientific development of design for the American home". She believed the designer "was an indispensable liaison officer between the manufacturer and the public, finding out what the public wanted and showing the manufacturer how to produce the desired article".

== Later life ==
Burke, along with fellow artist Margaret Preston, promoted the development and acceptance of Australian themed designs. She was a member of professional design groups including the Contemporary Art Society and the Society of Industrial Designers.

Burke was a leader and promoter of objects and fabrics that represented mid-century modern design in Australia. She introduce vibrant colours and bold motifs that became definitive of Australian design. In 1957 she stated:

"Soft furnishings should be regarded as a unit of total interior design. Simplicity in design is therefore most necessary for the purpose of relating them to other units like wall coverings, furniture, etc."

In 1995, the National Gallery of Australia celebrated International Women's Day with the exhibition Women Hold Up Half The Sky, celebrating the diversity of work produced by Australian women artists over the previous 150 years. Works included fabrics by Burke, paintings by Margaret Preston and textile art by Olive Ashworth.

== Commissions ==
Burke received many important commissions including:

- Sir Reginald Ansett’s Hayman Island Resort, 1949
- Australian embassies in Washington and Paris
- Hospitals in Metropolitan Melbourne and regional Victoria
- Canberra Civic Theatre (now known as Canberra Theatre Centre).

== Recognition ==
1970: Member of the Order of the British Empire for services to art and design

1987: Honorary Doctorate, Royal Melbourne Institute of Technology (RMIT) in recognition of her seminal and continuing influence on Australian design.

== Legacy ==
In 1994, on the occasion of Burke’s death, her life-long companion and business partner, Fabie Chamberlin (died 2005) donated the contents of Burke’s studio to RMIT University. The collection consists of textile samples, photographs and design ephemera now located in the RMIT's Design Hub.

The Museum of Applied Arts and Sciences also holds a collection of Burke's mid-century modern textiles which includes many designs that draw on the inspiration of Australian nature.
