= Mortimer Street =

Street in the City of Westminster, London

Coordinates: 51°31′3.86″N 0°8′26.67″W

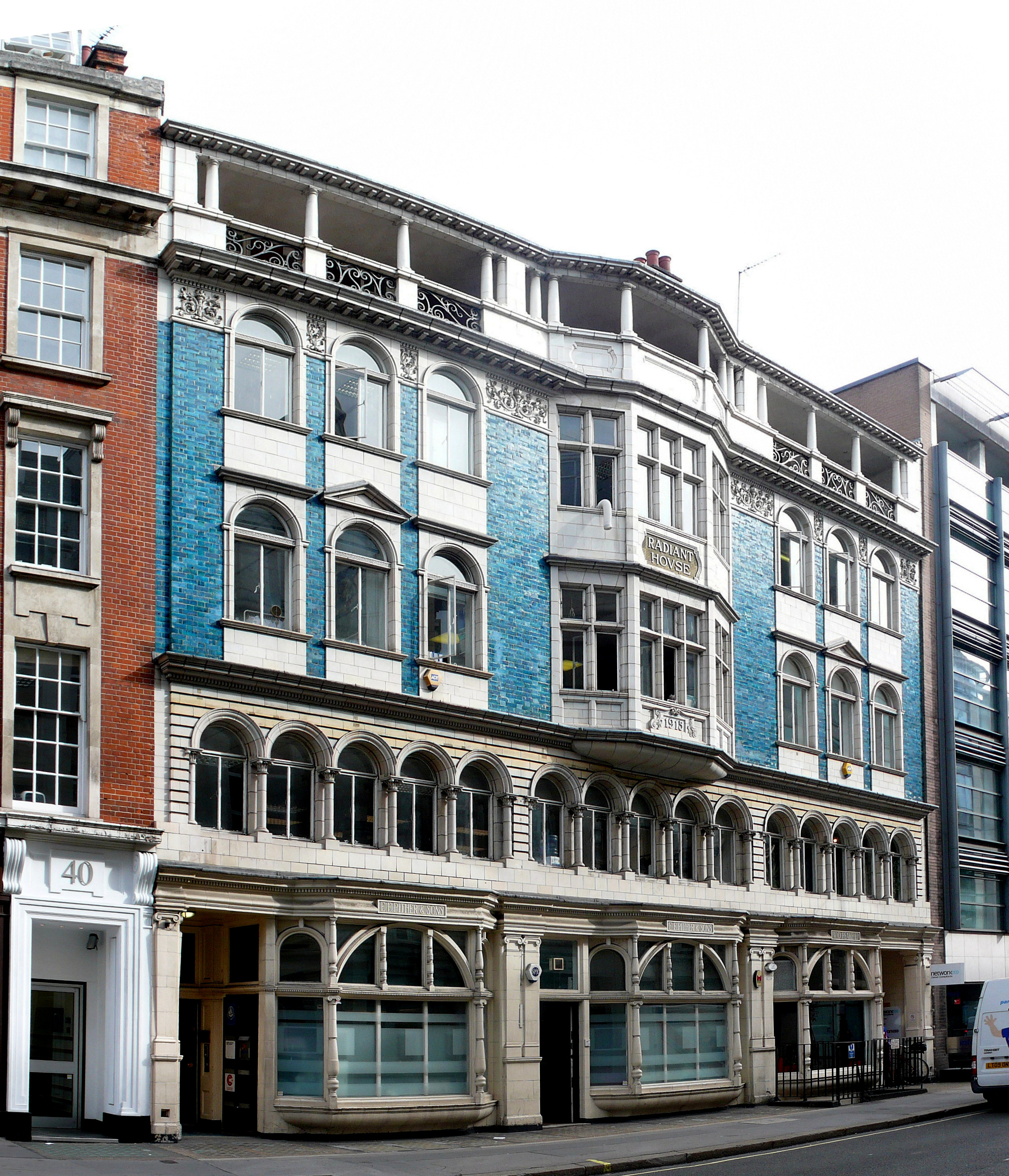
Radiant House, Mortimer Street.

Mortimer Street is a street in the City of Westminster. It runs from the junction of Cavendish Place, Langham Place, and Regent Street in the west, to the junction of Cleveland Street, Goodge Street, and Newman Street in the east. It is joined by Great Portland Street, Great Titchfield Street, Wells Street, Nassau Street, Berners Street, and Berners Mews.

== Notable buildings ==
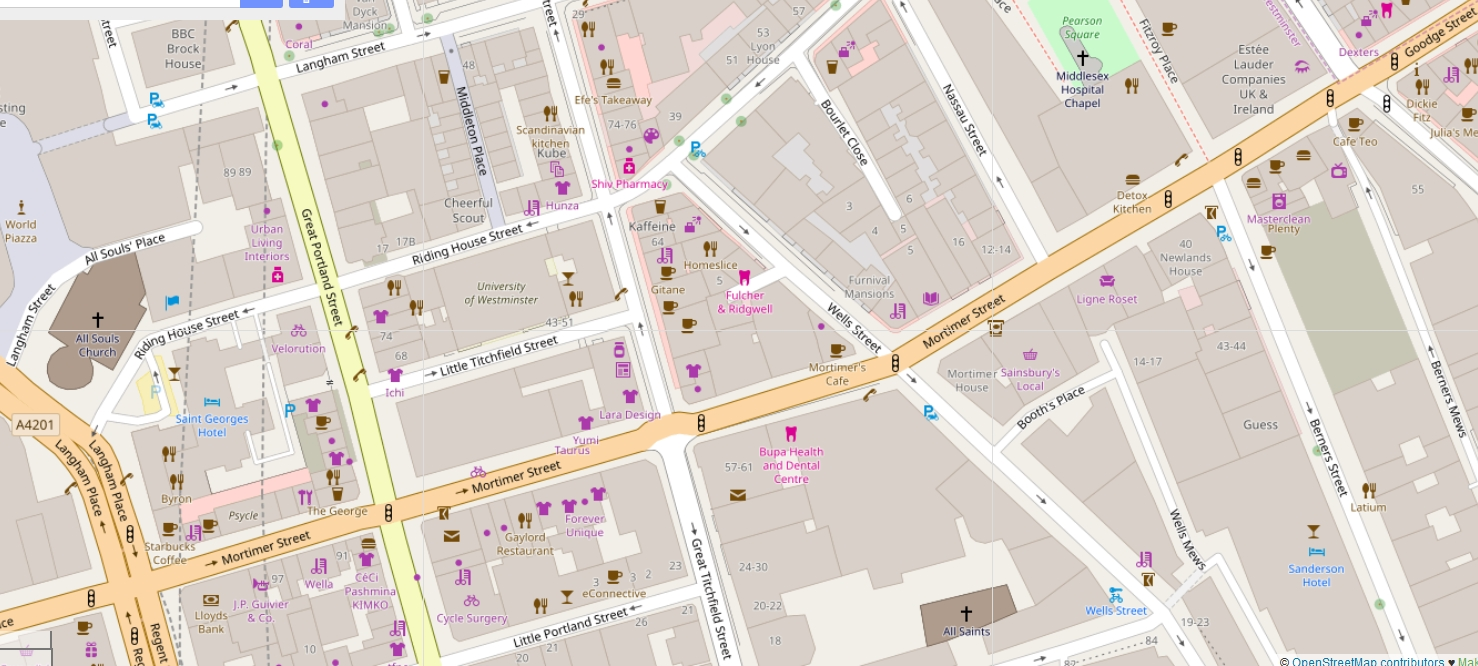
The Mortimer Street area

It contains a number of listed buildings:

- No. 10, Arts and crafts influenced offices.
- Nos. 34–38, Radiant House.
- Nos. 42 & 44, an arts and crafts influenced former youth hostel by Beresford Pite.
- The George public house.
- No. 82, c.1900, shop with offices above by Beresford Pite.
- No. 93, c.1906-10 office block by W. and E. Hunt.
