= Michael O'Connell (artist) =

English Modernist artist (1898–1976)

- Born: 7 August 1898
- Died: 9 December 1976 (aged 78)
- Education: Ushaw College as lay boy
- Known for: Textile artist
- Notable work: Pandemonium, Modernist frieze, 1930; Variety of British Farming, very large hanging for the 1951 Festival of Britain
- Spouse(s): Ella (m. 1931, 1900–1981) née Eleanor Emmie Evans-Vaughan
- Children: Terence (known as Seamus)
- Website: https://michaeloconnell.org.uk

Michael O'Connell (7 August 1898 – 9 December 1976) was an English Modernist artist who worked in Australia between World War I and World War II and then in England. He was a textile artist, with works held in the UK in the Victoria and Albert Museum in London, the Museum of English Rural Life in Reading, and the collection of National Museums Scotland, and in Australia in the National Gallery of Australia in Canberra and in the National Gallery of Victoria in Melbourne.

== Early life ==
Michael William O'Connell was the eldest son of Patrick O'Connell and his wife Mary Cecilia, and was born in 1898 in Dalton-in-Furness, Lancashire (Cumbria). After the death of his father from typhoid fever in 1900 he was brought up solely by his mother in Newcastle upon Tyne, and was educated as a lay boy at Ushaw College, a Roman Catholic seminary in County Durham. (Note: He did not start to train as a priest at Ushaw as some biographies state. It was a Roman Catholic seminary, but at that time it took lay boys.)

In World War I he was sent to the front in 1917 as a junior officer in an Irish regiment and was taken prisoner of war in 1918.

== Australia ==
After the war O'Connell took some training in agriculture before emigrating to Australia in 1920 to attend an agricultural college in Wagga Wagga.

He abandoned agriculture and moved to Melbourne. In 1920 to 1923 he travelled around Victoria painting watercolours, which were exhibited in Melbourne and well-received - some of his works were selected for a group exhibition of Victorian artists at the British Empire Exhibition in Wembley, London in 1924–25.

== Barbizon ==
By 1923 O'Connell was living in a tent on a block of land he had bought in Beaumaris on Port Phillip Bay where a number of painters lived before a health inspector condemned the tent and he had to pull it down and started construction of a house, 'Barbizon'. It was a decision that transformed his life; he became a craftsman-designer and a Modernist.

Through lack of money O'Connell built Barbizon himself, over 1924–25. Without an architect or builder and using the cheapest material he could find, concrete blocks made with sand from the site, he constructed an open-plan cruciform design which gave the minimum chance of the walls falling down. A local commentator observed that he "made it for himself out of bricks he made himself, and fitted it with furniture he made himself and hangings he made himself! The result is perfect."

Named after the French Barbizon school of art, its design and functionalism were born of necessity and looked to Modernism. It was his studio and a gathering place for fellow artists. He became a member and councillor of the Arts and Crafts Society of Victoria, where he met his wife Ella Moody (née Evans-Vaughan) (1900–1981). They married in April 1931 in Melbourne.

The house was lost in a bushfire in 1944 after his 1937 return to England.

== Concrete garden furniture ==
Arising from O'Connell's use of concrete for building Barbizon was his development of garden furniture design and pots, 'sculpture for the garden', often painted and dyed, treated so that it could be painted, or impregnated with colour. He built a sunken garden with concrete bird-baths, fountains, and large bowls for hyacinths, and malacoides. Innovative and experimental large-scale pots with relief panels, some painted in fresco, fountains, and birdbaths embellished with animals or figures, he advertised as 'sculpture for the garden'.

O'Connell gained commissions for garden furniture, and Edna Walling, prominent Australian garden designer, collaborated with him for an exhibition for the Arts and Crafts Society in Melbourne in 1927. In 1930-31 for the forecourt of theatre deco Castlemaine Art Gallery and Historical Museum, he was contracted to supply two cubic planters decorated with panels showing Australian animals cast in artificial stone (crushed rock mixed with cement), in stylist sympathy with Orlando Dutton's figurative relief over the gallery entrance, which is also in artificial stone. The decorative panels were the work of Ella, since O'Connell was by then engrossed in making the Pandemonium textile banner.

Edquist notes that with his sculptural works, unlike his watercolours, O'Connell joined the trajectory of Modernism, not on the scale of the heroic avant-garde, but as domestically focussed craft-based Modernist.

== Fabrics ==
O'Connell's success with the concrete garden furniture and his extreme frugality enabled him to afford a visit to England in 1929, passing through Italy and Paris. It is possible that it was in London that he first came across linocuts.

=== Pandemonium ===
On his return from Europe O'Connell continued with the concrete garden furniture, and in 1929/1930 started experimenting with printing lino-cuts on fabric, notably a long linen frieze, Pandemonium, one of his most significant works; it is held in the collection of the National Gallery of Australia. It consists of twelve individual panels joined to form a continuous sequence with decorative borders above and below depicting a 1920s penthouse party, with stylised figures of diners, dancers, and musicians, the two outermost panels showing sirens lying under a night sky, a motif that he continued to use - as Eve in some late works. O'Connell translates, on fabric, the imagery from the back of a large concrete seat that he exhibited in late 1929.

He reused the blocks from Pandemonium in a variety of ways to create other wall hangings and curtains. He had 'design rules', the first principle of which was 'fill every space with a definitely spaced pattern, e.g. in the case of foliage, say, cover the whole in rhythmical spacing and fill up the detail in between.'

Subsequently, O'Connell concentrated on hand-block printing on fabric. He used synthetic dyes, rather than the local vegetable dyes popular with members of the Arts and Craft Society, and had to carry out extensive research into the dyes and the dyeing process, becoming very knowledgeable.

== Success ==
O'Connell's fabrics rapidly became very successful in artistic circles in Melbourne. In 1934 an art critic wrote:

As a master craftsman in the production of hand block-printed textiles, curtains, and fabrics, Michael O'Connell ranks among the best artists in Australia. The range and variety of his designs show that he has rare powers of invention; and his sense of colour is very evident. One gets more stimulus from a display of his fabrics than from many an exhibition of pictures.

In 1936 he exhibited fabrics in the Rocke salon at the Myer Emporium, and The Age critic reported that

There is amazing variety in both design and colour in this exhibition, which proves how far the artist has gone in his experiments, in which he has the valuable assistance of his wife. Although for the most part his designs are essentially modern, they have still that quality of "liveableness" which appeals to the person who cannot afford frequent changes in home furnishing...In these block-printed linens there are lovely sweeping lines in restful colours, deep blues, soft greens, glowing brick pinks, cool lemon yellows and greens, olive, beige, rust, and crimson. Sometimes the design is small and circumscribed, yet the choice and combination of colours gives it a spacious air when used for a deep armchair or a luxurious couch. Many of these linens are beautiful in themselves, because of the nature of the designs and the quality of colour...others would depend to a considerable extent for their effect on the use that was made of them, the circumstances in which they were used, whether for hangings or coverings, and so belong to the second fabric class. But they are all the work of an artist with a true feeling for line and colour.

O'Connell was established at Barbizon, his Modernist residence that secured his place within Melbourne's avant-grade community while serving as the operational base for his concrete garden furniture business. As his fabric design business expanded, the house evolved into a prominent studio space and cultural hub. It regularly hosted artists, clients, journalists and events for the Arts and Crafts Society, while frequently being featured and photographed in contemporary design journals.

He worked with garden designer Edna Walling, sculptor Ola Cohn, furniture designer Frederick Ward, Modernist shop-owner Cynthia Reed, then young editor and publisher Harry Tatlock Miller, and patron of the arts Maie Casey.

However, in the view of John McPhee, one time curator of Australian Decorative Arts at the National Gallery of Australia and Prof. Harriet Edquist, author of his biography, O'Connell's role in the development of Modernism in Australia has been largely overlooked. She has written:

there has emerged a consensus ... [that] Australian Modernism began in Sydney in the 1920s and was only taken up in Melbourne in the 1930s. O'Connell's role in articulating a Modernist position through his craft practice in the 1920s, initially in the building of Barbizon and later with his cement furniture and figures, has remained outside this historical purview, as has his practice as a printmaker independent of textile design. ... Yet in his time, the innovative nature of O'Connell's work was recognised by fellow artists, designers, architects, critics, clients and retailers.

Edquist called the biography The Lost Modernist.

== Britain ==
O'Connell and Ella moved to England in May 1937 taking fabric designs, patriotically themed to encourage sales during the coronation of George VI. They built their new home, The Chase, at Perry Green, near Much Hadham, Hertfordshire next to sculptor Henry Moore, living meanwhile in a tent on site and producing some work to pay for its completion.

Though wanting to build the house using concrete blocks as at Beaumaris, O'Connell instead had to use conventional brick and timber to comply with building regulations. The second-hand bricks were old and uneven, from nearby demolished cottages, giving the house an aged hand-wrought character. As at Beaunaris, the house was set in a clearing edged by concrete pots, and again, it was a studio house. It had a low lath and plaster workshop attached to the brick house, a large room for showing work at the far end with a ladder/stair up to a small bedroom under the eaves, and the living room with large fireplace, kitchen and primitive bathroom between. Meanwhile, Ella turned The Chase into a smallholding with goats, chickens, vegetables, and an orchard, assisted by Tom Perry of Perry Green and produced linocut postcards depicting villages in the area.

O'Connell held a number of exhibitions and received commissions in Britain before the war, among them the Arts and Crafts Exhibition Society at Burlington House; the Daily Mail's Ideal Home Exhibition; Edinburgh Weavers, Harrods; and the Shakespeare Memorial Theatre. At this time he met Christopher Heal, of Heal's store in London, who said:

it was the first time I had met a craftsman who could handle vat dyes producing fabrics in colours that would not fade. The designs were striking, of a kind unlike any I had seen. I quickly decided to buy some and hold a small exhibition of Michael's work in the Fabric Dept; so began a long lasting friendship.'

=== World War II ===
In World War II O'Connell served in the artillery at Dover and then was moved to the Royal Ordnance as an Inspector of Dangerous Buildings at a munitions factory in Chorley, Lancashire. He exhibited stage curtains and backcloths for theatre and ballet at Heal's galleries. Due to war-time economies, the designs were block-printed on inexpensive, rough-textured fabrics of cotton and jute, unbleached linen and hessian. A Birmingham Post reviewer noted burlesques and fantasies on period themes, and in keeping with the war, an early English design showing St. George, triumphing over dragons. Drawings by Sheila Hawkins showed the application of the fabrics to costume design and fashion.

Evacuees from London joined Ella at The Chase including Australian artists Sheila Hawkins and James Cook, and Australian Marxist revolutionary Mark Bracegirdle. In 1943 Ella and Michael were in Chorley for the birth of their son, Terence (later known as Seamus).

After the war, fabric was in short supply, but Christopher Heal ensured O'Connell's supply of heavy rayon fabric. In this period he had several assistants and his methods and style evolved; he now used a mixture of lino blocks and freehand painting with paste resist. He drew the design on paper with coloured chalk and poster paints, and when it was dry his assistants Iris and Betty scaled it up, transferred it to huge sheets of brown paper and perforated it. The paper was then placed on top of the fabric which had been cut to size, mordanted and laid out on a flat linoleum surface, weighed down at the corners with flat irons and bricks, and the design was transferred to the fabric by pouncing. After mixing dyes with paste resist (china clay, gum arabic, caustic soda), Iris and Betty funnelled the mixture into a piping bag with a nozzle, and then piped the fine lines and outlines of the design on the fabric, the rest being filled in with brushes. When completely dry, the finished textile was hung up in the studio until there was enough to justify a dyeing session. The background dyeing took place outside in large dye baths and fixing the colours in boiling water and sulphuric acid before the item was scrubbed on the concrete yard to remove the china clay to reveal vibrant colours. After final washing in softened water, the textiles were dried and sewn to length.A large mural might be taken to its destination in pieces, left to drop into shape, and then flat-seamed together.

O'Connell started to focus on the wall hanging or 'painted tapestry' as a form of contemporary, democratic and transportable mural art, supplying factory canteens with bright hangings on rotation. His imagery was influenced by, among others, Raoul Dufy and French tapestries, medieval pictorial conventions, as in the hangings depicting local villages, and theatrical stage sets. He worked on commission and for exhibitions, in addition to continuing to produce designs for Heal's. Around this time he sometimes combined his name and Ellas' to sign his works 'Mael'. Australian connections persisted - a commission for Australia House in London in 1947 and a large group of murals sent to Melbourne in 1952 for a solo exhibition at Georges department store.

He was a foundation member of the Institute of Contemporary Arts in 1946, and became caught up in progressive and idealistic initiatives to enliven public and industrial environments, such as recreation rooms and canteens - motifs in hangings from this period often include plates of food. He produced hangings for schools for a number of local authorities, and bedspreads for two Oxford colleges and Reading University, and a London hospital. Commercial commissions included the Olivetti showrooms in London and Moss Bros. He also exhibited widely at this time, including at the CoID's Britain Can Make It at the V&A in 1946, the Hambro House of Design in New York in 1950, the Arts and Crafts Exhibition Society at the V&A in 1950, and the Beaux-Art Gallery in London in 1951.

In these years the relationship between O'Connell and Ella started to become strained, and from 1950 Ella and Terence did not live at The Chase, while O'Connell had a long-term relationship with Elizabeth Wilson. However, O'Connell and Ella did not entirely separate, and over the years she and Terence often spent weekends at The Chase, sometimes all three went on holiday together, and Ella occasionally did some work for him.

=== 1950s onwards ===
Tanya Harrod has written that the Festival of Britain, on the South Bank in London in 1951, was an 'initiative of a Labour government, it was put together in a spirit of war socialism. All the leading designers and architects of the day were involved and the exhibition was meant to be inclusive, honouring every class and region in Britain.'Henri Kay Henrion designed the Country Pavilion and commissioned O'Connell to produce a very large wall hanging, 4 metres high by 56 metres long, in seven sections, depicting the Variety of British Farming. It is now in the collection of the Museum of English Rural Life (MERL) in Reading, where one of its panels is on permanent display.

In December 1951 O'Connell exhibited his work, including tapestries, chair and settee covers, curtains and table covers, all using the technique of painting with dyes onto cloth, at the Archer Gallery in Westbourne Grove, London.

O'Connell travelled across the country, taking observations of characteristic agricultural scenes, drew up seven cartoons, now in MERL's collection, and a produced a fabric sample, Caledonia, now in the collection of National Museums Scotland. Edquist writes that 'he drew stylistic inspiration from medieval painting, particularly the tradition of the 'labours of the month', estate maps and heraldry, which he skilfully hybridised with folk art and contemporary content'. He used linocuts for repeated motifs, such as trees and foliage, while regionally specific elements such as barns and cattle were hand-draw in resist, as were the many tiny figures on tractors, feeding hens, having a cup of tea, or whatever. The panels represent Rutlandshire, Scotland and Wales, Cheshire, Northern Ireland, Yorkshire, The Fens, and Kent. They were sewn together in situ in the Country Pavilion by Betty Sheridan working from a ladder.

After their display the panels toured New Zealand and Australia before being acquired by MERL, where they were used as backdrops to their tents at country shows before being put into storage and forgotten until 1998, when they were rediscovered and researched by curator Jill Betts. Two, Cheshire and Kent, have since been conserved. and are displayed in rotation for five years each at MERL.

After the Festival of Britain O'Connell was able to progress to producing more modern work. Henrion gave him further commissions, notably for the Time-Life Building in New Bond Street in London a series of column motif curtains across the south wall of the reception area. For Heal's he designed lengths of printed fabrics using abstract designs, such as Synchromesh, but sometimes base on stylised natural forms, such as Chrysanthemum. He was filmed in his studio for a television program Artists at work, episode 3, broadcast 20 August 1952.

But for many clients he had to continue with the more traditional styles and imagery as used in the Festival hanging, responding to the mood of the times, the celebration of the coronation of Queen Elizabeth II.

As more kinds of fabric became available he moved on from the heavy rayon to linen, cotton, and silk and experimented with more complex techniques, multiple dyeings and wax resist (batik) as well as paste resist. At the same time he began to systematise his motifs into recognisable categories or vocabularies which allowed him to work on different themes, imagery and technique simultaneously and produce coherent bodies of work within each theme. His designs reflected the times, his travels, his interests, and the commissions he received, ranging through, among many others, the steel works in Corby, electrical circuits, heraldic motifs, history and mythology, Mexican figures, African motifs, ancient megaliths, pop art, and Saul Steinberg, whose drawings he greatly admired. He produced designs for Heal's printed fabrics, and Henry Rothschild, another admirer of his work, displayed his hangings in his Primavera arts and crafts gallery shops in Sloane Street London and King's Parade Cambridge. He also continued to make large concrete garden pots as a sideline.

=== Linear period ===
Murder of Beckett, for a school in Leicestershire, illustrates what O'Connell called his 'linear period' or style. It is featured in Tanya Harrod's Disorder in the World of Work : The Crafts in Britain in the Twentieth Century and in 1999 was included in the Pleasures of Peace exhibition which accompanied its publication.

=== African themes ===
In 1954-55 O'Connell visited southern Africa and exhibited in Johannesburg. On his return he was commissioned by United Africa Company Textiles to produce a small handbook on resist-dyeing and tie-dyeing techniques in order to introduce the 'many women of West Africa who do craft dyeing ... to modern techniques of dyeing, which give the dyes greater lasting power and leave the cloth pleasant to touch.' For his own work he appropriated African motifs such as masks, totems, and animals, arranging them in columns and grids which could be combined with an abstract vocabulary of dots, lines, and circles in various ways for cushions, curtains, and other furnishing fabrics.

=== Electronics ===
In the late 1950s O'Connell became interested in developing motifs that were abstractions of the modern world, and came up with the Electronics series, following a commission from an electronics company. However, he became ambivalent about pure abstraction and in time he began to morph the motifs into three-dimensional, sculptural, and humanoid shapes with selected shading, as in this hanging, which also gives a nod to his neighbour Henry Moore, whose sculpture he could see at the top of the field opposite the end of his workshop.

=== 'Stony' works ===
Going into the 1960s O'Connell developed a new 'stony' technique, which he used for work representing religious themes, such as the Flight into Egypt, and in many other Celtic, archaic, and archaeological images.

=== Flower Power ===
In the 1960s Le Rêve was a Chelsea restaurant at the heart of Swinging London. O'Connell had an arrangement to hire it six hangings, changed annually or bi-annually, so for O'Connell it became a small gallery for a select and fashionable audience. Though in his sixties, he visited London regularly and kept up with what was going on. He developed a new form of abstraction where fragments of his vocabulary were meshed with imagery from the contemporary metropolis, often broken letter shapes. A work from this period, Covent Garden Underground, is in the collection of the London Transport Museum in Covent Garden.

In 1967 O'Connell noted 'The idea of "The Flower People" appeals. Have a go.' He was then approaching seventy but his family gave him an entrée to London's counterculture. His son Terence (then known as Seamus to his friends) had been at school in Cambridge with Roger Waters and Syd Barrett of the Pink Floyd, and Ella, increasingly eccentric, had moved to a central London bedsit in a 'hideous block full of deranged people', where Syd also lived for a time and spent evenings with Ella talking about the occult, Tarot, astrology, runes, and the like. So when the Pink Floyd played at the Architectural Association's student Christmas carnival O'Connell went along. The impact of psychedelic flower power can be seen in the heightened colour, composition and forms of his new work, many of them with flower power girls transformed into strange images, Vanity, a woman gazing into a mirror, or exotic reclining nudes, sometimes explicitly Eve and temptation, reprising the sirens from the 1930s.

=== Batik ===
In the late 1960s O'Connell not only shifted his thematic interests but also his dyeing technique. He had always used paste resist but he had known about Javanese batik wax resist and now he started to experiment with it. He also shifted from heavy linen and cotton to light cottons and silk, which were much easier to handle. Tanya Harrod says that the only other adventurous exponent of the technique at the time was Noel Dyrenforth. The two occasionally showed together, and Dyrenforth attended one of O'Connell's workshops.

=== Difficulties ===
In Australia O'Connell's standing in the cultural and artistic milieu of the time had been bolstered by his collaboration with avant-garde architects, designing his fabrics for furnishing within a whole approach to interior design, sold through smart design shops and department stores and shaping the look of 1930s Modernism in Melbourne and to an extent in Sydney. He brought this practice back to England, exhibiting in the Ideal Home show and selling through Heal's. The 1951 collaboration with Henrion led to further commissions from architects and institutions, but the connection with architecture began to loosen in the 1950s and into the 1960s and O'Connell felt his position becoming less secure. A number of factors contributed to this: he was out of sympathy with much contemporary art; in the art world textiles did not have the cultural cachet of painting and sculpture; his practice had no tradition or authority behind it since he had invented it for himself and he was not a gifted communicator on his own behalf - besides, he had had no formal art training; he did not have a commercial gallery or dealer, nor a partner to manage his work and promote it; he was not well-organised - no curriculum vitae, no inventory of works, few records of clients, only occasional partial lists of his major commissions for gallery biographies - though, fortunately, in the late 1950s he did start to take photographs of his hangings, and it is through them that the extent of his later output can be gauged. The frustrations of doing everything himself became an increasing source of depressive anxiety. However, in compensation, he did have the continuing support of Christopher Heal and Henry Rothschild, among others, and some significant recognition: he was a foundation member in 1965 of the Hampstead Arts Centre (later the Camden Arts Centre) whose director Jeanette Jackson had a cottage in Perry Green; and in 1968 he was made an Honorary Member of the Society of Designer Craftsmen for his 'great services to the crafts in this country'.

=== Teaching and assistants ===
Teaching had always been a part of O'Connell's practice from the time he took classes at Melbourne Tech in the early 1930s, and he taught privately at The Chase from the 1950s. As large commissions fell away in the late 1960s he came to rely on teaching for a regular income. His wide network of colleagues and friends ensured that he was invited to colleges for lectures and demonstrations. His main teaching commitment was at Ware College of Further Education, nearby in Hertfordshire, where his good friend John Tobin was an art teacher and ensured that he was on the staff from 1968. Tobin also sent students to The Chase to see him at work, including Sue Parnham, who became a regular assistant. Jeanette Jackson of the Hampstead Arts Centre also taught at Ware College and took her students to The Chase.

O'Connell's most important studio assistant from the late1950s to the 1970s was Jo Jones, who lived nearby in Hunsdon. He saw her as a colleague on whom he could rely - and indeed she claimed that it she who came up with the idea of using plastic wire wool to create the 'stony' effect. Along with the Tobins, she became a regular part of O'Connell's local social and professional network.

=== The Hoops and open house at The Chase ===
In the 1950s and 1960s local artists and writers would gather on Sunday lunchtimes at The Hoops, the pub in Perry Green, and on sunny days many of them would move on to The Chase afterwards. That was consciously intended by O'Connell. He carefully nurtured, as he wrote in July 1966, his 'little oasis of garden woodland surrounded with more flowers than ever before and the artistry of concrete stone and fabric'. He was keeping open house, another echo of his earlier life in Beaumaris.

=== Fire in the workshop ===
On 13 May 1970 two students, in O'Connell's absence, were at The Chase were heating wax on a paraffin stove which left unattended and caught fire burning the timber-framed workshop to the ground, scorching the wall next of the house and damaging part of the roof. Locals, including Henry Moore's assistants, could save little from the workshop, though fortunately O'Connell kept most of his hangings in the house. However he lost most of his diaries kept in the loft under the roof and he felt their loss keenly. O'Connell's safety practices were primitive, resulting in three earlier small fires in the 1960s and 1970s, two in this same manner.

Friends rallied round to support him, and by June work had started on rebuilding, much of it done by O'Connell himself, despite his being seventy-two at the time, and by August he was back in the house and by November it was more or less restored.

=== Final years ===
After the fire came a time of mixed fortunes for O'Connell. On the positive side he had new work for Le Rêve, invitations for exhibitions, and more teaching and lecturing. He got involved with the Perry Green and Green Tye Preservation Society, who included his garden in their Open Gardens Day in 1972. He continued to travel in the UK and abroad, including to Wales with Ella in 1971. Edquist says that in this period his works lacked the thematic consistency that characterised the previous decades and ranged through whimsical figures, abstract and bright dot designs, mandalas, biblical themes, and reprisals of English kings and queens; O'Connell sensed a new mood driving the craft revival of the 1970s, and that the Heal's buyers "didn't want their collection spoilt by my odd-man-out contribution".

In 1973 an acrimonious dispute with Ella to do with the ownership of The Chase ended their difficult 45-year relationship and increased O'Connell's anxieties about his financial position. He retreated to America in 1974, after receiving an invitation to teach in New Mexico, a trip he repeated in 1975, teaching, exhibiting, and travelling into Mexico, meeting new people and staying with them, which energised him sufficiently to produce new designs and become optimistic about future possibilities of work, in design or teaching, but with a reduced productivity due to his increasing depression and sense of frailty, facing a threat of arthritis in one arm, and with the right eye affected by glaucoma. Nevertheless, he planned an exhibition for Spring 1977 at Christine McGegan's Over Haddon gallery in Derbyshire. In late 1975 director Forbes Taylor made a documentary on him for Anglia TV, out of which came a batik depicting the filming. Having planned to return to New Mexico and Canada in the summer of 1976 he cancelled the trip due to his visual impairment and instead he spent some time travelling in the UK, staying with friends Christopher Heal and Henry Rothschild, and visiting galleries in London, and others joined him at The Hoops. He was reflective, going over old diaries, remembering Australia, trying to gauge the worth of his life's work, and aware that he had never kept comprehensive records.

In the early morning of 8 December 1976 O'Connell was driving towards Bishop's Stortford when he was dazzled by the sun and hit another car, writing off his own car. Refusing to be taken to hospital, he accepted a lift back to The Chase, saying that he was all right and that he would call a doctor. Instead he carried out a premeditated plan and shot himself outside the far end of the workshop and was found the next day by a young Australian student coming to work at The Chase. An inquest was held. Edquist writes that he had planned suicide in August 1973, when he was struggling with depression, thoughts which recurred in the next three years and in diary entry for 26 November, shortly before his death; "The inevitable is ahead, but face it cheerfully as was so in the 2 wars. The corporate cheerfulness and courage always shown in gatherings and units big and small was a great factor in sustaining morale."

A funeral service for O'Connell was held 21 December 1976 at Harlow Crematorium.

== Legacy ==
At the time of the inquest John Tobin, head of Ware College art school was reported as saying O'Connell's "death was a great loss to the local community. Many of his dyes and fabric dying techniques have literally died with him... He was a fine artist and craftsman." While Peter Hibberd, of the Copper Kettle Gallery remembered him "as a father figure. He was a true professional. He remained consistent throughout his life. Within his own sphere of batik work he was a world figure."

Consequent to O'Connell's death, Christine McGegan's planned Over Haddon show became a retrospective. She wrote in the introduction:

Over the many years of friendship I came more and more to admire his overflowing inventiveness (which he kept right up to the end of his life), his inspired facility with the medium of batik itself and his wit and his humour which came out so much in his work. It was always an adventure to visit Michael at The Chase, the house he had built for himself in a clearing in the woods. The Chase had an improbably Hansel-and-Gretel look ... From the windows you could see across the lawn the big concrete pots that Michael had made which stood like sentinels at the edge of the wood.

Edquist writes: 'The connection between O'Connell, his house and his craft impressed everyone who knew him.' She sums up his life thus:

In choosing to build and craft his houses with his own hands out of inexpensive materials, to expand this experience into experimental ceramics and objects for the garden, to discover and work with textiles, O'Connell created a life that was slow, labour-intensive, painstaking and fundamentally domestic. The city did not hold him. His settings for work were the coast of Port Philip and the rural idyll of Hertfordshire. Barbizon and The Chase were dwelling, studio, showroom, his whole life. While he inwardly railed against what he saw as increasing discrimination against his kind of craft and while he saw little joy in a world increasingly dominated by violence and war, he did not waver in his belief in the value of his work as a craftsman.

Edquist quotes Richard Sennett on Heidegger's discussion of humans seeking to return to dwelling more simply in nature: 'a famous image in these writings of Heidegger'a old age invokes "a hut in the Black Forest" to which the philosopher withdraws, limiting his place in the world to the satisfaction of simple needs. This is perhaps a desire that could be kindled in anyone facing the big numbers of modern destruction," concluding that: "O'Connell had faced "the big numbers of modern destruction" as a nineteen-year-old on the Western Front, and his response was to create his own version of the forest hut."

== Exhibitions ==
- 1927: Arts and Crafts Society, Melbourne
- 1936:Fabrics. Rocke salon, Myer Emporium, Melbourne
- 1948, April: Printed hessian hangings. Radiant House, Liverpool
- 1950, April: Solo show of curtains, tapestries and dress materials, opened by Lady Cripps. Asian Institute Galleries
- 1950, July: 16 hand-painted tapestries. Cotton Board, Colour, Design, and Style Centre, Manchester
- 1951, December: Archer Gallery, Westbourne Grove, Westbourne
- 1952: solo exhibition. Georges department store, Melbourne

=== Posthumous ===
- 2013–14: retrospective exhibition. The Gibberd Gallery, Harlow
- 2011-12: exhibition in associated with the publicastion of Edquist's book. His biography, Michael O'Connell: The Lost Modernist by Prof. Harriet Edquist of RMIT University. Bendigo Art Gallery

== Cited works ==
- Edquist, Harriet (2011). Michael O'Connell: The Lost Modernist. Melbourne, Australia: Melbourne Books. ISBN 978-1-877096-38-9.
- Harrod, Tanya (1999). The Crafts in Britain in the Twentieth Century. New Haven, CT, USA: Bard, Center, Yale University Press. ISBN 0-300-07780-7.
- Scurfield, Matthew (2008). I Could be Anyone. Gozo, Malta: Monticello Publishing. ISBN 978-0-9556952-0-9.
- Chapman, Rob (2010). Syd Barrett: A Very Irregular Head. London: Faber and Faber. ISBN 978-0-571-23854-5.
- Palacios, Julian (2010). Syd Barrett & Pink Floyd: Dark Globe. London: Plexus Publishing Ltd. ISBN 978-0-85965-431-9.
- Sennett, Richard (2008). The Craftsman. London: Penguin Books. ISBN 978-0-14-102209-3.
