= Frank Minshull Elgood =

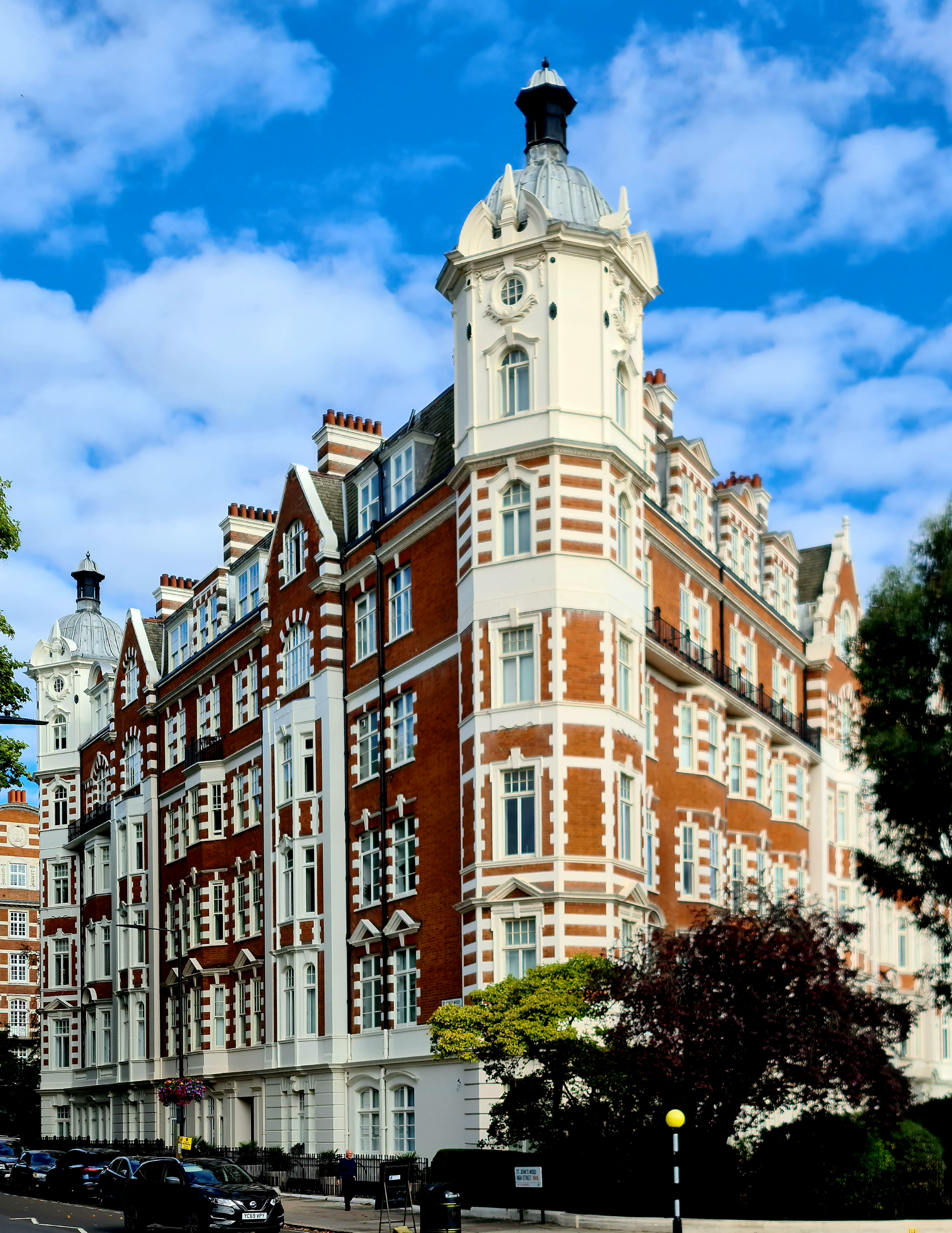
Northgate Mansions, St John's Wood High Street

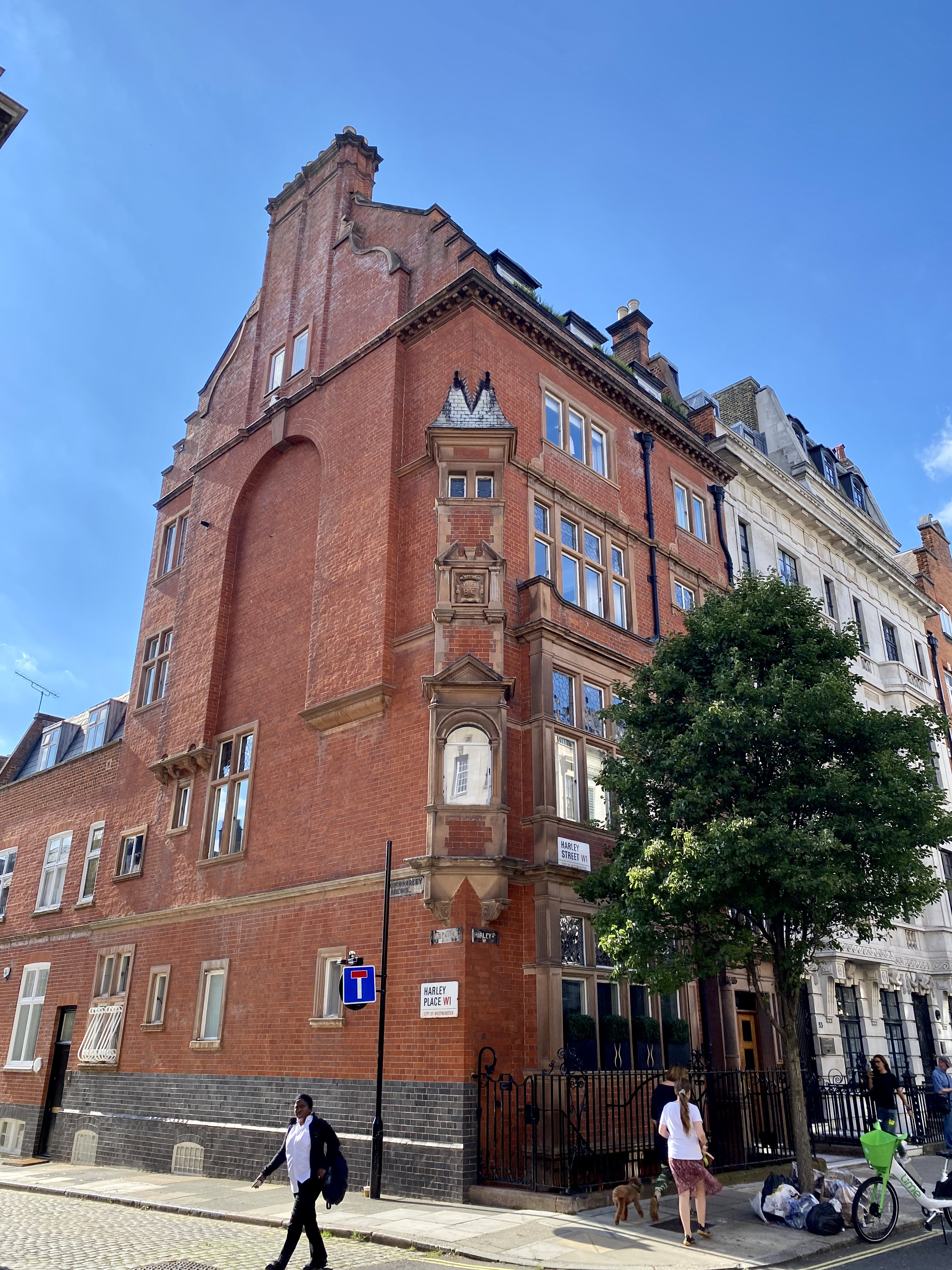
51 Harley Street, London 1891

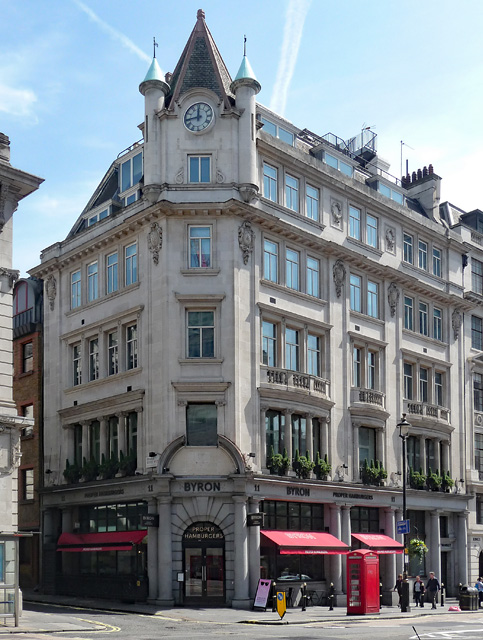
Dewar House, Haymarket, London 1908

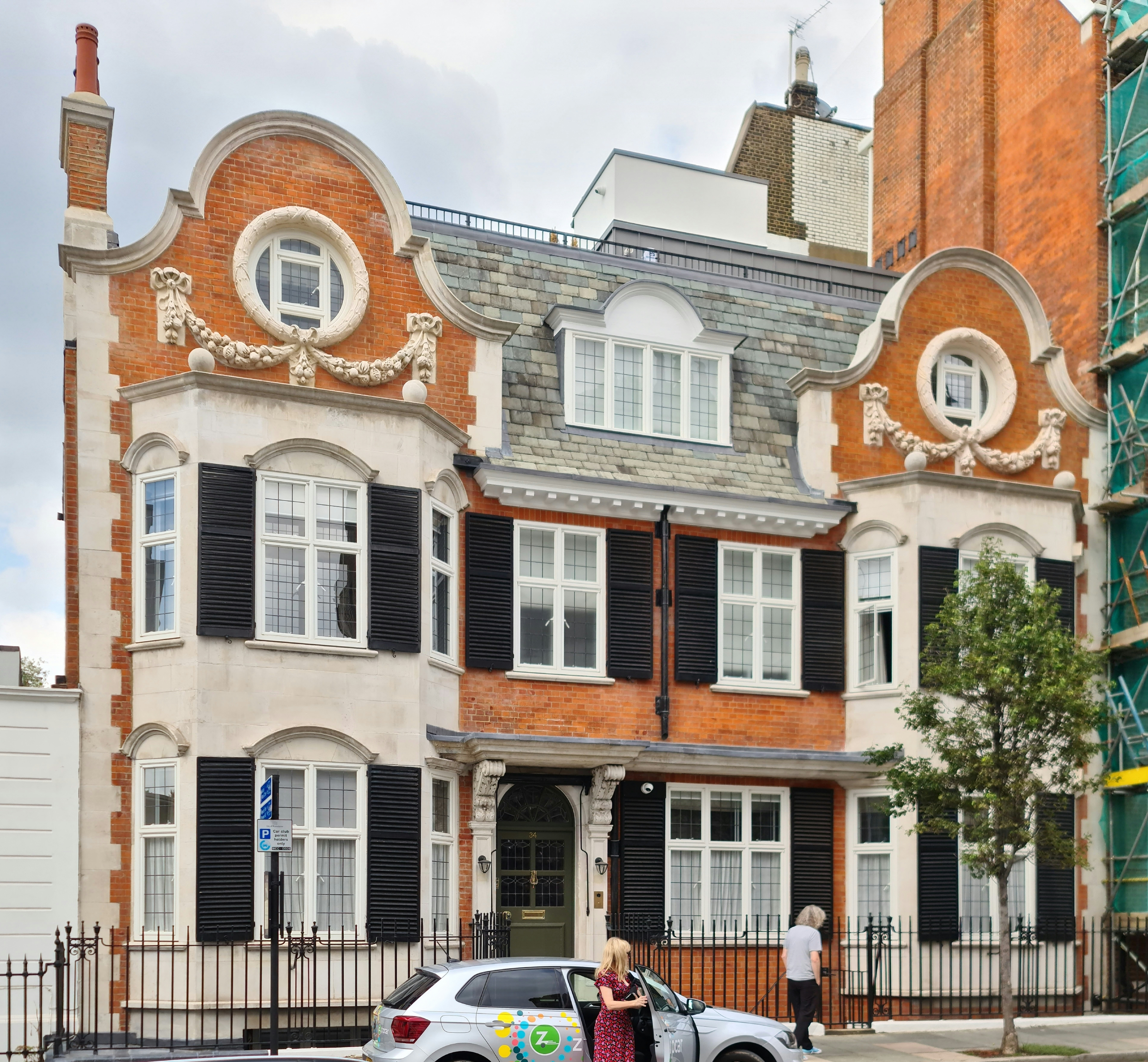
34 Weymouth Street, London 1908

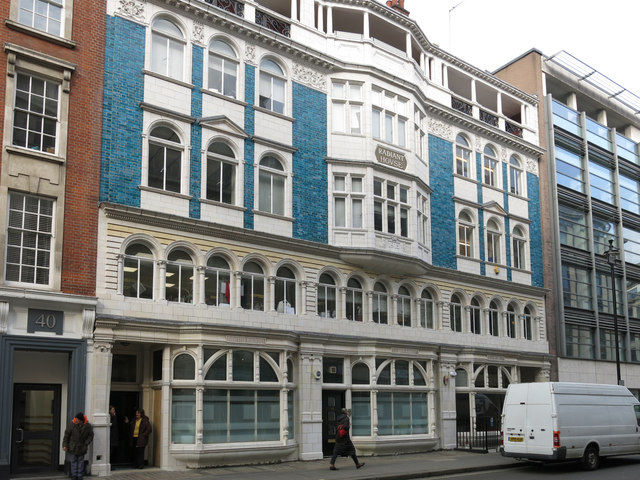
34-38 Mortimer Street, London 1915

Sir Frank Minshull Elgood CBE FRIBA (1865–1948) was an English architect based in London.

== Life ==
He was born on 5 March 1865 in London, the son of George James Elgood (1883–1914) and Susan Minshull Jones (1838–1921).

He married Frances Isabel Lloyd Allen (1868–1940), daughter of Charles John Allen (1832–1887) and Augusta Maria Lloyd, on 17 November 1891 in All Souls’ Church, Hampstead, and they had the following children:

- Cyril Lloyd Elgood (1892–1970)
- Reginald Lloyd Elgood (1896–1917)
- Dorothy Hope Elgood (1902–1986)
- Francis Rosemary Elgood (1906–1995)

He was appointed an Officer of the Order of the British Empire (OBE) in the 1918 Birthday Honours, Commander of the Order of the British Empire (CBE) in the 1931 New Year Honours, and knighted in the 1943 New Year Honours for his work as chairman of the executive board and Honorary Treasurer of the Church Army.

He died on 17 May 1948 in Haywoods Heath. and left an estate valued at £98,827 (equivalent to £3,106,800 in 2025).

== Career ==
He was articled to Alexander Payne from 1882 to 1886 and then served as assistant to Goymour Cuthbert in 1886. Later in that same year he was associated with Alexander Payne, but also practiced independently.

He was a member of Ruislip-Northwood Urban District Council from 1904 to 1917 and its chairman from 1906 to 1908 and again from 1912 to 1915. He was chairman of the Ruislip-Northwood Town Planning Committee from 1910 to 1915, and housing commissioner for the Ministry of Health from 1919 to 1921. He was Chairman of the National Housing and Town Planning Council from 1921 to 1923, and the surveyor to the Hope-Edwardes and Howard de Walden Estates in London.

He entered into a business partnership with Edward Hastie from 1919.

He was appointed Associate of the Royal Institute of British Architects in 1889 and made a Fellow in 1908.

== Works ==
- 80 Wimpole Street, London 1885
- 11 Harley Street, London 1886 (with Alexander Payne) for William Morrant Baker, physician and surgeon
- 7 Wigmore Street, London 1889 (with Alexander Payne)
- 81 Wimpole Street, London 1891
- 41-42 Devonshire Street, London 1891
- 9 Harley Street, London 1891
- 39 Harley Street, London 1894
- 51 Harley Street, London 1894 for William Bruce Clark, surgeon
- 39 Harley Street, London 1892-95
- 8-10 Wigmore Street, London 1896
- 7 Charles Street, London 1900
- 49 Harley Street, London 1901
- 8 Bulstrode Street, London 1902
- 11 Welbeck Street, London 1905
- Northgate Mansions, St John's Wood High Street/Prince Albert Road, London 1907
- Emmanuel Church, Northwood 1908
- 34 Weymouth Street, London 1908
- Dewar House, Haymarket/Orange Street, London 1908
- 19-21 Great Portland Street, London 1908
- 71-74 Marlebone High Street, London 1910
- 59 New Cavendish Street, London 1910
- 85 Wimpole Street, London 1913
- Radiant House, 34-38 Mortimer Street, London 1915 (with Francis Léon Pither)
- 50 Great Portland Street, London 1928 (with Edward Hastie)

== Sources ==
- Cherry, Bridget; Pevsner, Nikolaus (2002). London 3: North West. The Buildings of England. New Haven and London: Yale University Press. ISBN 0-300-09652-6.
- Bradley, Simon; Pevsner, Nikolaus (2003). London 6: Westminster. The Buildings of England. Yale University Press. ISBN 978-0-300-09595-1.
