= West Library (Islington) =

Public library in Islington, England

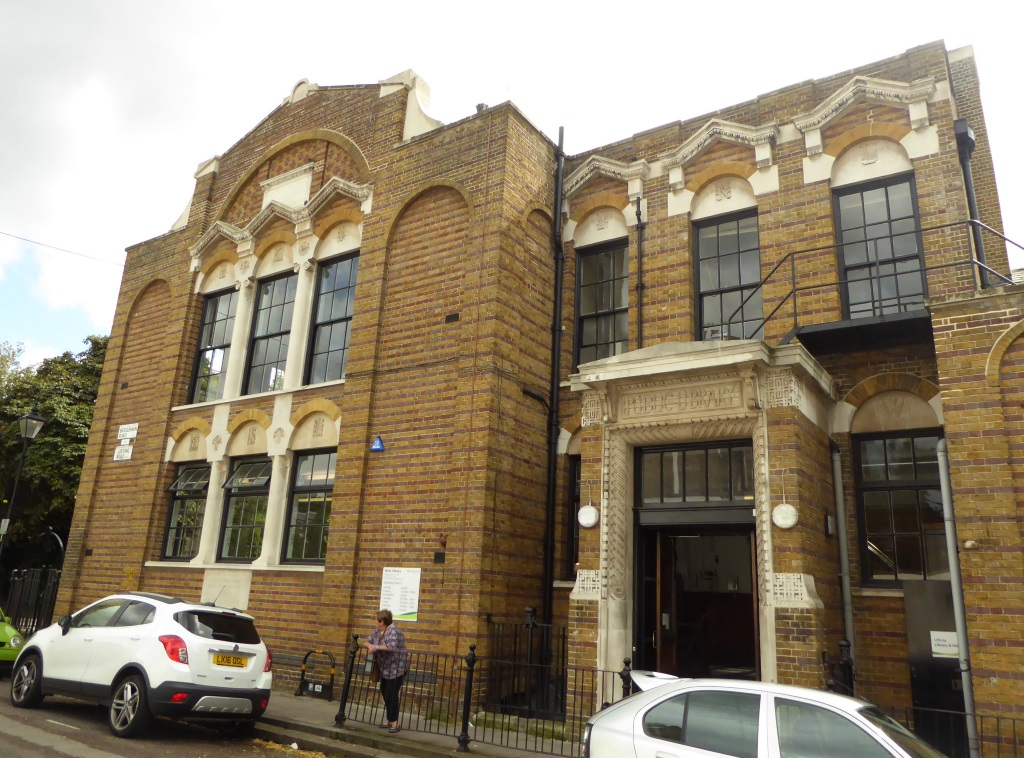
- The library in 2016
- 51.5409°N 0.1163°W
- Location: Bridgeman Road; London, United Kingdom
- Type: Public library
- Established: 1907; 119 years ago
- Architect: Arthur Beresford Pite
- Branch of: Islington Libraries

Collection
- Size: 14,887

Access and use
- Circulation: 32,032 (2024/25)

Other information
- Director: Jamie Mearns
- Public transit access: Caledonian Road & Barnsbury; Caledonian Road; Highbury & Islington
- Website: Official website

Listed Building – Grade II
- Designated: 30 September 1994
- Reference no.: 1280963

West Library is a public library in the London Borough of Islington, England.

Located on Thornhill Square, it opened in 1907. It was awarded Grade II listed status in 1994.

== History ==
=== Establishment ===
Architect Beresford Pite

The West Library was opened on 24 July 1907, by Alderman G.S. Elliott, JP, with Percy Harris (then Chairman of the London County Council) and Thomas Lough, MP. The local paper described the ceremony as a 'humorous jumble of bans and blessings'.

The building had an estimated cost of £8,700, of which £5,000 came from Andrew Carnegie, as part of a grant that saw the construction of 4 Carnegie libraries across Islington.

The library was designed by Beresford Pite, and was built by C Dearing and Sons. Pite was at this point a well-established architect, with other projects including Paganini's Restaurant (c. 1889), Christ Church, Brixton Road (1897-98), and the Chartered Accountants' Hall (1893). Later, he would work on buildings including 30 Euston Square (1905-08), a new entrance to the Burlington Arcade (1911-30), and a cathedral in Uganda (1913-18).

The building is made of yellow brick, set in bands of purple brick, with a slate roof. In the spaces over the windows, all 26 letters of the alphabet are engraved, superimposed on a Greek palmette design.

Plans for the West Library by Henry Hare

The library was designed as an open-access library, a design that was inspired by American libraries, and that had recently been introduced to the UK by James Dufff Brown at his previous posting in Clerkenwell, in 1894. The Lending Department was structured around one monitored entrance/exit door with a wicket, though the preference at the time was for a separate entrance and exit door (see plans).

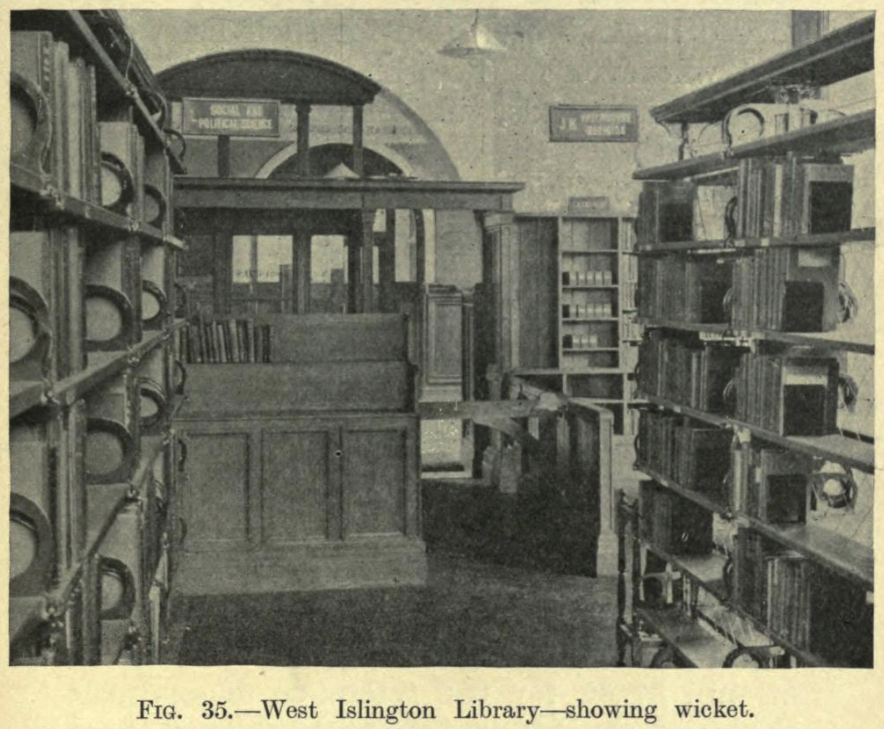
A view of the lending department, 1915

=== Avoided closure, renovation ===
In the 1960s, a room was set aside in the library to facilitate access to television for residents of the Borough, with a focus on "programmes of cultural interest", mainly on BBC Two.

In the late 90s, the library was threatened with closure as part of Islington Council budget cuts. In the end, partly due to an active campaign by the Friends of Islington Libraries, no libraries were closed.

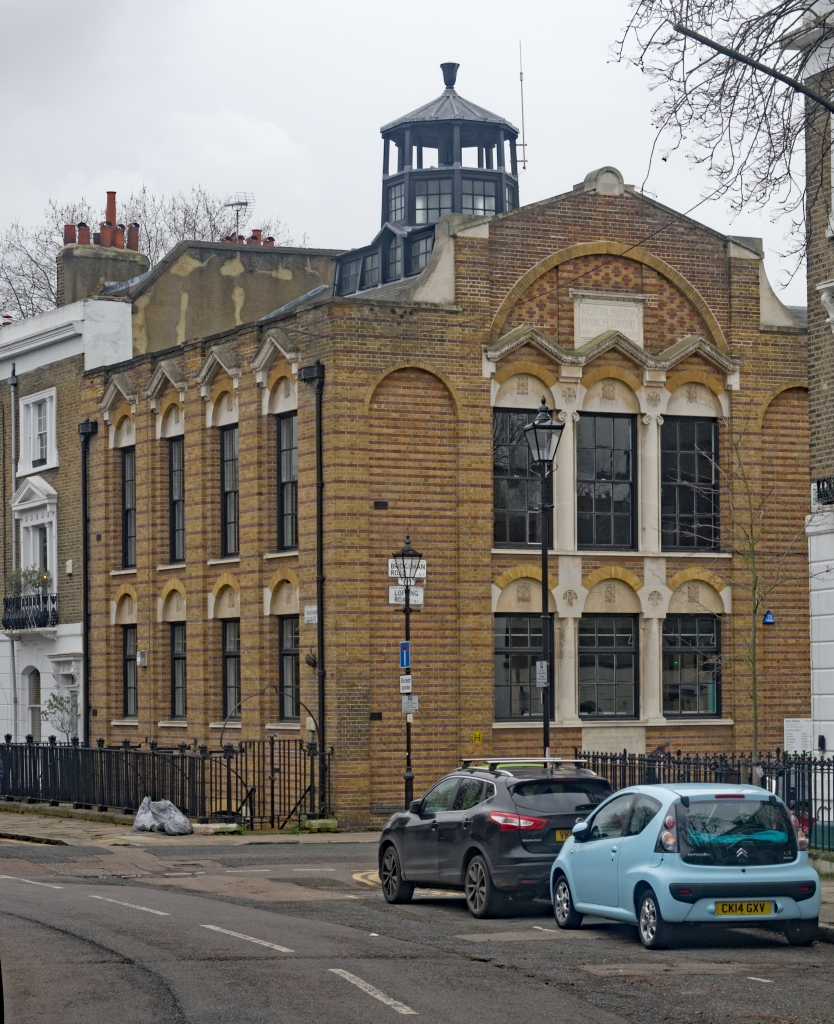
The library in 2020

The library reopened in 2011 following a significant renovation funded by the Big Lottery Fund's community libraries scheme. The renovation added self-service stations, a new reading space, and additional PCs, as well as a lift. At the time, Islington Council's executive member Paul Convery noted that

"this library is an important landmark in Islington. Although there are savings to be made, we should invest in public buildings to make them work better. As a council our total vision is to improve quality of life, and a library is central to this vision. This is a library that does so much more than lend books – it is an educational resource. It is one of our real jewels, and we are determined to preserve what jewels we have.”

In 2021, as part of the "We are Cally" campaign, Islington Council announced that an empty first floor reading room would be made into a youth employment hub.

== Services ==
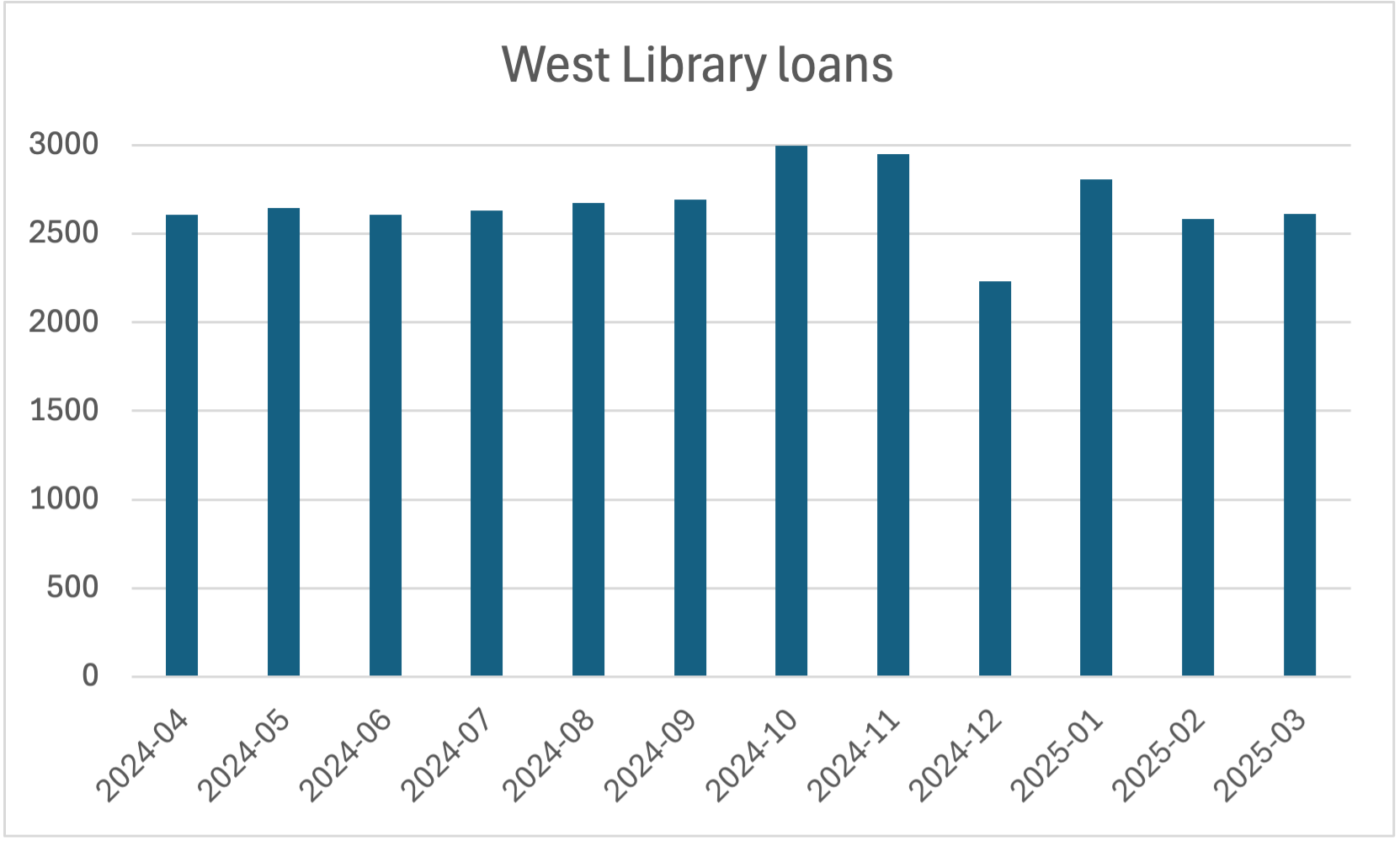
Loans increase over the summer months.

In 2024/25, the Library had 1,470 active members (8th in the service), and 87,258 visits over the year (5th in the service). On average, it performed 2,669 loans per month (7th in the service), rising to around 3,000 loans in the summer months. The Library also has a toy library, where parents can borrow toys for their children.

On top of serving as a lending library, West Library provides access to 6 free public computers, free wifi, and printing facilities. The Library also hosts Islington's youth employment hub.

In 2018, West Library manager Adenike Johnson reflected that:

"People are really isolated, especially old people, so libraries are their lifeline. In my library we have an exhaustive list of things for the community, from dance classes and live music once a month, to children’s clubs, writing classes, dominoes, baby bounce, cooking and taekwondo – there’s more to libraries than some people think."

The West Library Hall can host around 100 people. In 2024/25, the library hosted events including World Book Night with author Kia Abdullah, and an art workshop event with royal portrait artist Phillip Butah. In 2024/25, West Library welcomed 8,066 attendees for events – 13% of attendees to all Islington Library events.

The lower ground floor and ground floor of the library are wheelchair accessible via a lift.

== In popular culture ==
- The library was used for filming a polling station in the third series of The Crown.

== See also ==
- Islington Borough Council
- Islington Libraries
- Beresford Pite
- Islington Central Library
- North Library (Islington)
