= The George, Fitzrovia =

Pub in Fitzrovia, London

The George
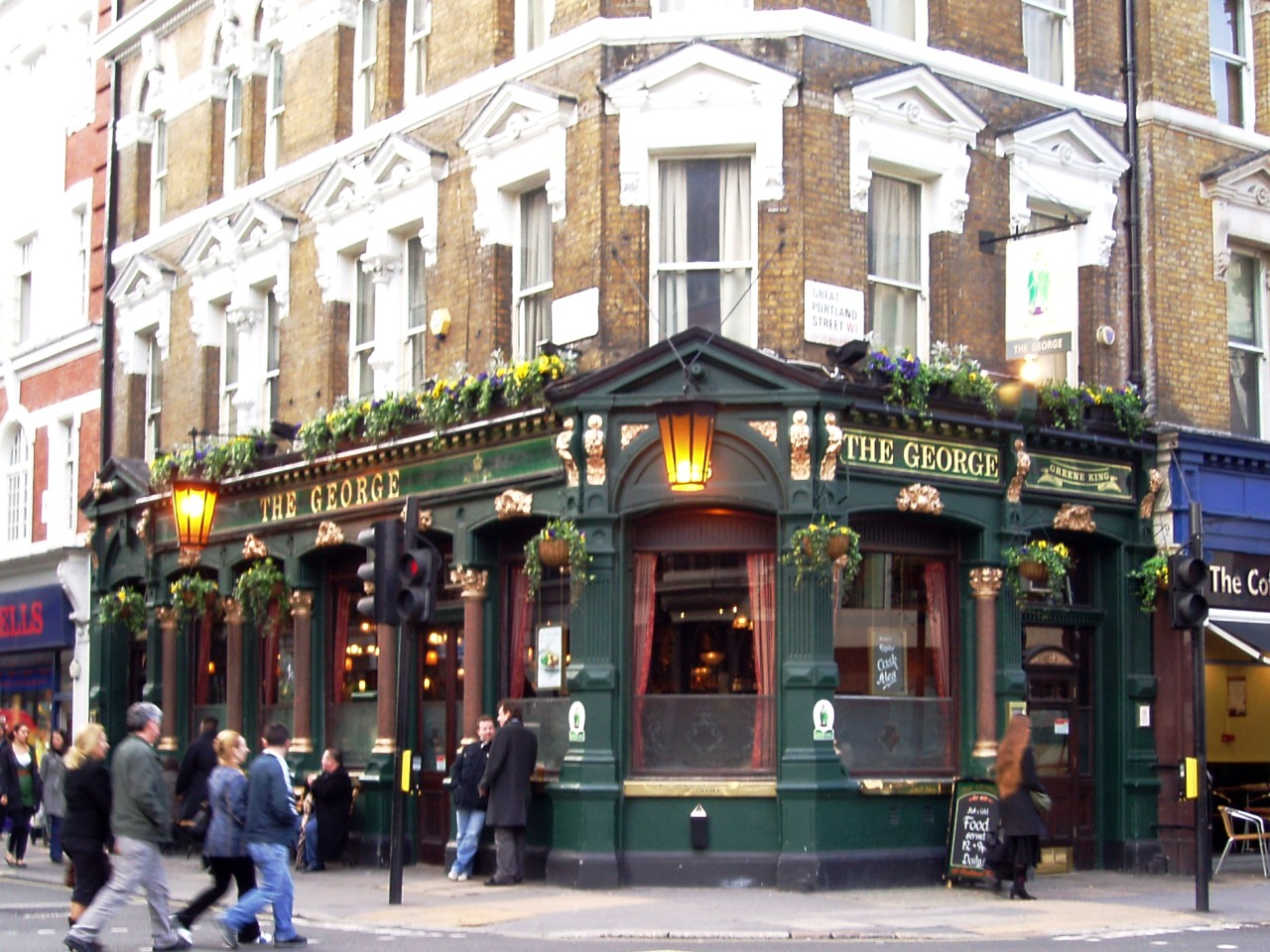
- The George
- Type: Public house
- Location: 55, GREAT PORTLAND STREET
- Coordinates: 51°31′4″N 0°8′31″W
- Architectural style(s): Italianate

Listed Building – Grade II
- Official name: GEORGE PUBLIC HOUSE
- Designated: 20-Feb-2008
- Reference no.: 1392409

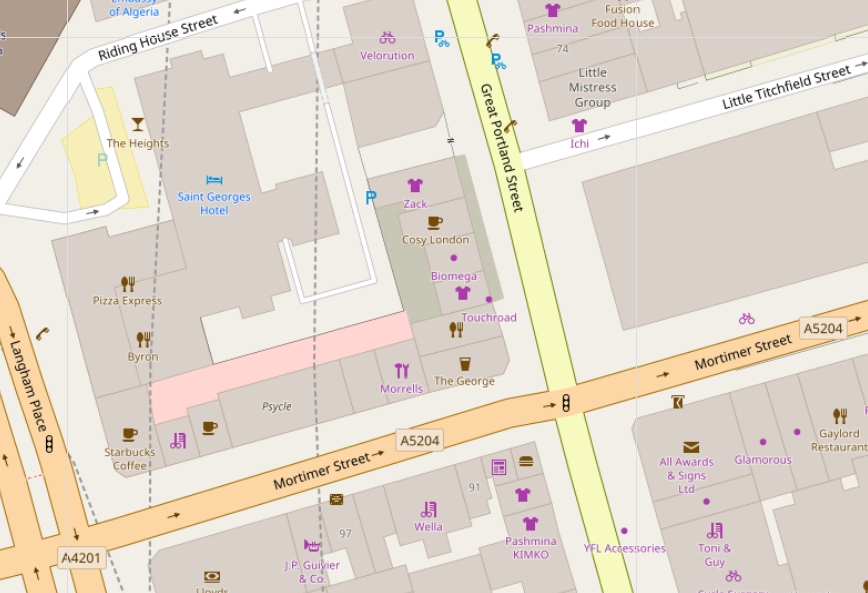
Location of The George (centre)

The George is a grade II listed public house on the corner of Mortimer Street and Great Portland Street in the City of Westminster, London.

According to Historic England, it has an Italianate façade from the 1860s and a more ornate frontage than typical of a pub of its age. The interior is also notable for its surviving ornate original features which include glasswork, panelling, and painted tiles depicting riders and dogs.

On 25 November 2021 The George was reopened by JKS Restaurants in partnership with Dominic Jacobs and James Knappett after four years of closure and an extensive restoration.
