= 42–44 Mortimer Street =

Building in Westminster, London, England

Coordinates: 51.5179°N 0.1405°W

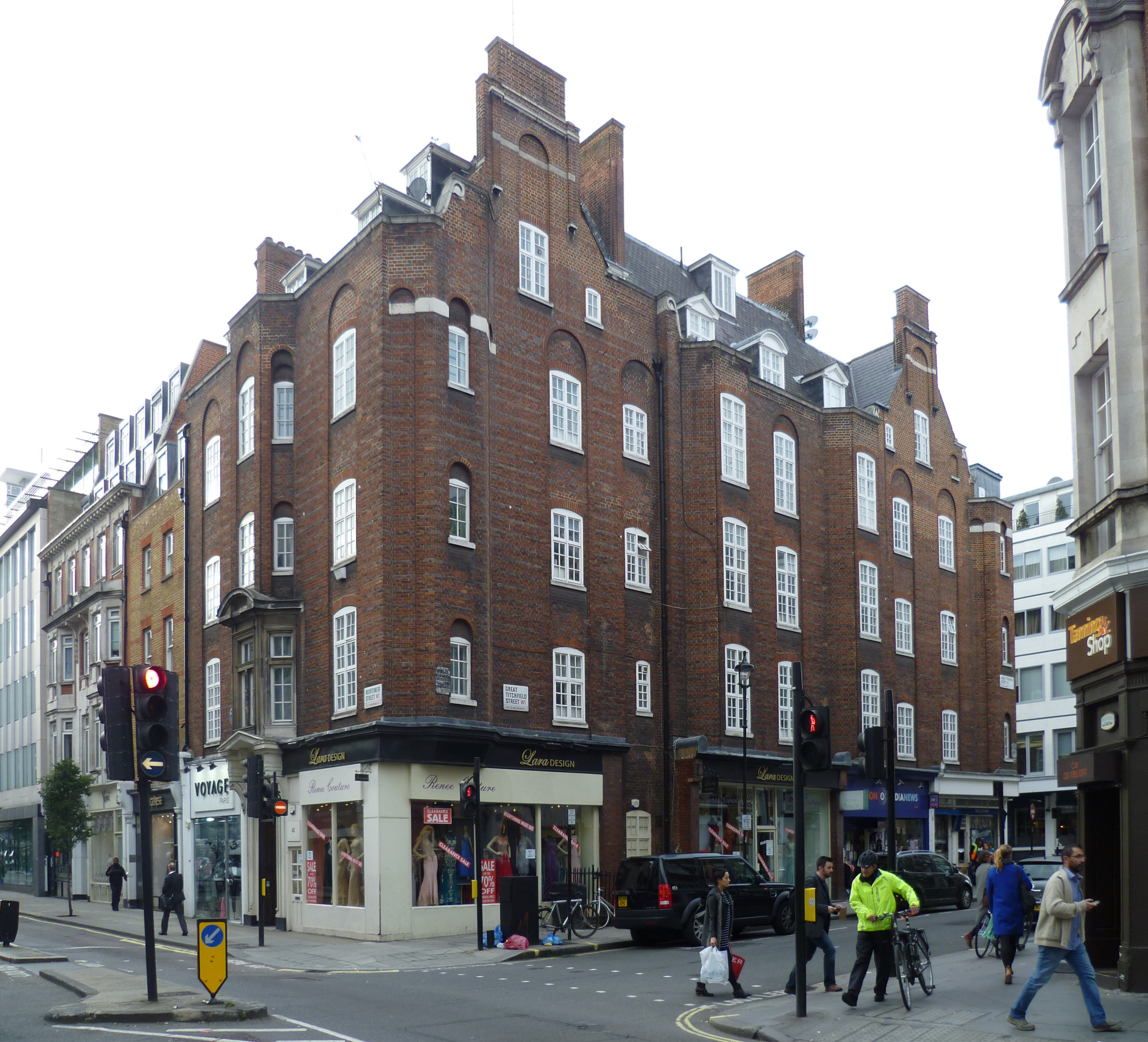
42–44 Mortimer Street

42–44 Mortimer Street is an architecturally notable former youth hostel in Mortimer Street, in the City of Westminster, London. It was designed by Arthur Beresford Pite and is grade II listed with Historic England. A London County Council plaque on the building records that the sculptor Joseph Nollekens once lived on a house on the site.
