= Arthur Beresford Pite =

Portrait by Walter Stoneman, c. 1916

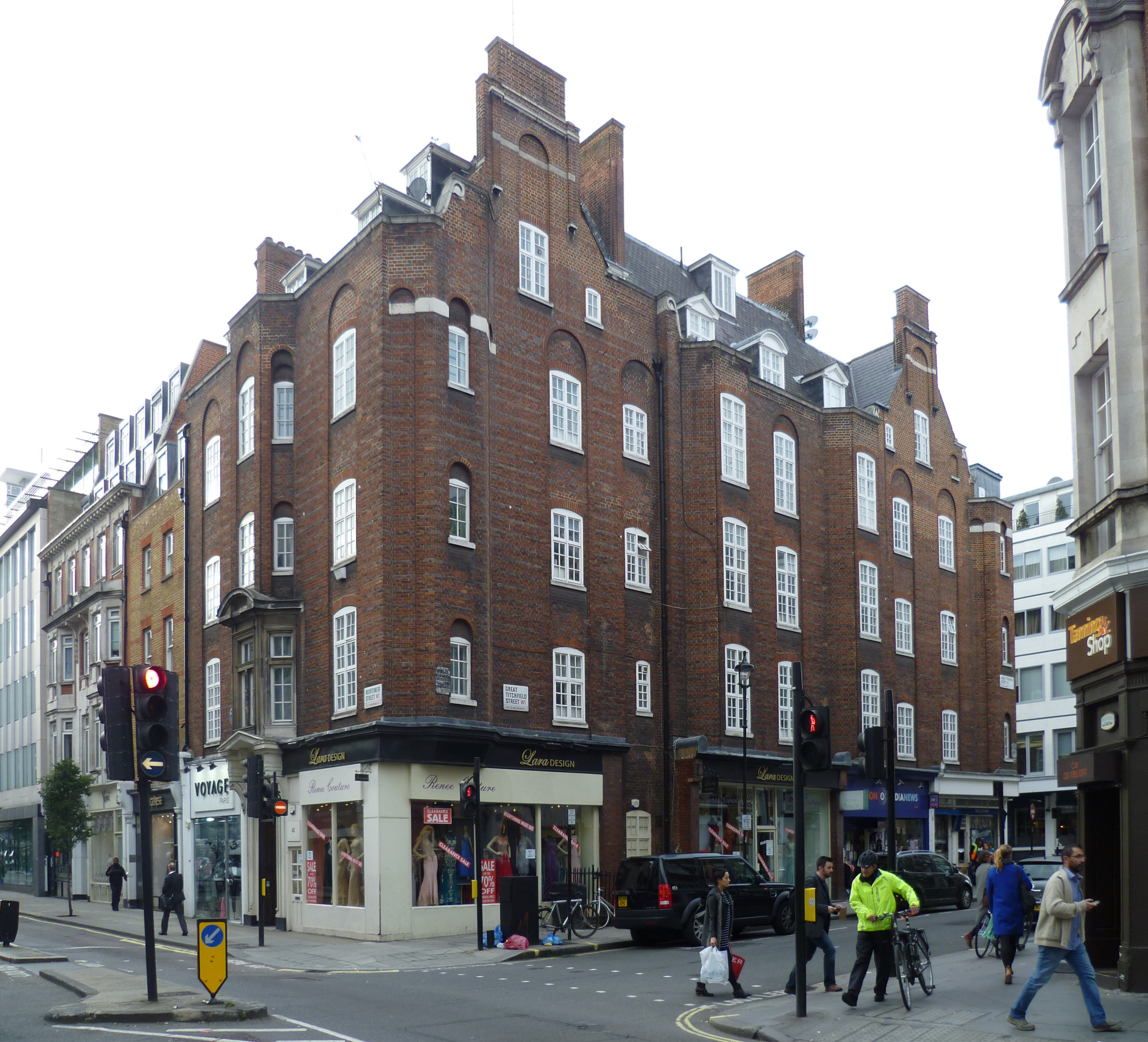
42-44 Mortimer Street by Pite.

Arthur Beresford Pite (2 September 1861 – 27 November 1934) was a British architect known for creating Edwardian buildings in Baroque Revival, Byzantine Revival and Greek Revival styles.

== The early years ==
Arthur Beresford Pite was born on 2 September 1861 in Newington, London to Alfred and Hephzibah Pite.

Pite was educated at King's College School. In 1877, he entered the office of The Builder's Journal doing mainly literary work, he also attended the Royal Architectural School. In 1882 he became a partner with the notable architect John Belcher. They had already been friends for some time. Architectural historian Alastair Service has described Beresford Pite as 'a vividly original thinker' who together with Belcher developed the 'striking yet intimate Baroque style' which Belcher became known for in the 1890s.

Pite worked in the Belcher office until he won the Royal Institute of British Architects (RIBA) Soane Medallion for his design for a West End Club House in 1882. Following this, Pite travelled to the continent with his brother William (also an architect) and they were joined by Belcher and J W James for part of the trip. Pite returned to Belcher's practice and the partnership lasted 12 years.

== Mid life ==
The Pite family transferred to Ramsgate, Kent where Arthur and William shared rooms and an architectural office. In 1887 Arthur married Mary Kilvington Mowll and they moved back to Brixton, London. They had four children, Grace Sarah (1888), Ion Beresford (1891), Molly (who died shortly after birth) and Arthur Goodhart (1896).

== Professor ==
Pite continued working on his commissions including the Burlington Arcade, Piccadilly, Christ Church and one other church in Brixton, Kampala Cathedral, Uganda, a hospital in Jerusalem, the Chartered Accountants' Hall in Moorgate (with Belcher), the West Library in Islington and buildings in Marylebone to name but a few. He served as professor of architecture at the Royal College of Art from 1900 to 1923 and professor at Cambridge University where he was considered a gifted teacher and speaker. As an active church member, he ran a bible school for young students and a weekly bible class for prisoners in Wormwood Scrubs Prison. He designed many notable non-conformist churches with Alfred Eustace Habershon (b. 1865 or 1866) who was enumerated as a Greenwich resident in 1901 and had an office in Queen Street, Erith. During this period, with the sculptor Edward Clemens, he also designed several War Memorials including those at Cheadle Hulme, Harrow, and Canterbury. He designed the Chapel at Monkton Combe School as its First World War Memorial, which opened in June 1925.

== 30 Euston Square ==
In 1906, Pite began his commission to build the headquarters of the London, Edinburgh and Glasgow Assurance Company at 30 Euston Square. It was a magnificent building of Portland stone, Grecian in style and spanning seven floors. The building took two years to build and was opened on 22 January 1908. The main entrance hall was decorated with yellow and sage green Doulton Parian ware, tiled arches and a curious ceiling of dentils. The mosaic floor features an astrological design. The director's boardrooms on the first floor are lined in oak with oak strip floors and stunning marble fireplaces as their focal point. The basement housed the records for the Assurance Company; the walls are three feet thick in places and further protected by steel "bomb blast" doors. The new office building was also fitted with a passenger lift, electric lighting and oil-fired central heating. Considerably modern for its time, Pite's detail was meticulous; each window arch was lined with white glazed brick, which can only be seen if you lean out of the window backwards! Five light wells, also lined in white glazed brick, flooded the lower floors with light. Further light was provided to the basement level by skylights. Pite was asked to add further extensions fronting Melton Street almost as soon as the Euston Square building was finished. He continued to enlarge the building for almost 20 years with the addition of the 9 Melton Street tower being his final work there. With the widening of Euston Road in the late 1920s the final expansion took place; the architect this time was not Pite but one of his contemporaries, Josiah Gunton. The London, Edinburgh and Glasgow Assurance Company had moved out in 1910, the new occupants were the National Amalgamated Approved Society. The building is Grade II* listed due to its significant architectural importance.

== The Marylebone years ==
At least half of Pite's smaller commissions were in the Marylebone area off Oxford Street. He always retained an office in this vicinity even when he lived in Brixton and Beckenham. At 48 Harley Street, Pite was asked to make alterations on the property for Gibson Sankey. His trademark mosaic tiling, this time in blue glass, still remains today surrounding the entrance. Pite built 82 Mortimer Street circa 1900 for Doctor Dudley Buxton as a family house and consulting rooms. It was constructed of red brick and Portland stone over 4 storeys with a basement and slated mansard. The sculptures flanking the 2nd floor, seated male and female figures, were not by Pite but produced by the firm of Farmer & Brindley, architectural sculptors.

Arguably one of Pite's most revered works is 37 Harley Street in South East Marylebone. Built in 1897-9, architectural press at the time proclaimed it to be 'nothing short of a revolution in Harley Street architecture'.

Pite regularly attended the Nash-built All Souls Church in Langham Place, where he was invited to design the Peace Memorial floor of 1918/19. Its Byzantine mosaic style is reminiscent of his floor in the London, Edinburgh, and Glasgow Assurance Company's entrance hall.

== Later life ==
In 1914, Pite moved his home to Hampstead. Following Mary's death, his sister Annie cared for Arthur and his family. His daughter Grace who suffered ill health spent most of her time at Earlywood with Sadler, the family's old nanny as she felt the coastal air more beneficial.

In 1919 Pite became a Governor of Monkton Combe School, a position he held until 1931.

In 1930, Pite moved to Beckenham, Kent to live near his brother William and this is where on 27 November 1934 he died from exhaustion and skin cancer. He is buried in London at West Norwood Cemetery.

== See also ==
- Holy Trinity Church, Clapham
- Pagani's Restaurant
