= J. R. Tranthim-Fryer =

Australian sculptor and educator (1858–1928)

John Robertson Tranthim-Fryer
- Born: 1858
- Died: 13 July 1928 (aged 69–70)
- Occupations: Australian sculptor and educator
- Known for: First director of Swinburne Technical College

John Robertson Tranthim-Fryer (1858 – 13 July 1928) was an Australian sculptor and educator, the first director of what became Swinburne Technical College in Melbourne.

== History ==
Tranthim-Fryer was born John Robertson Fryer in Hobart, Tasmania, the only son of James Robertson Fryer (c. 1825 – 5 February 1897), a Hobart merchant, and his wife Marianne Delve Fryer, née Briant (died 12 December 1894). They had a home, "Alverstoke,” in West Hobart. He showed an early interest in art, which was encouraged by William Schuetz (died 1905), a Hobart artist.

In 1884, he took art classes under Achille Simonetti and Lucien Henry at the Sydney Technical College, in which he was highly successful, winning a scholarship for a further two years' training. culminating in 1889 with a qualification from the South Kensington institution. Thus accredited, in June 1890 he was appointed secretary of Tasmania's Technical Education Board, in which capacity he first became known by the surname Tranthim-Fryer. While in that position he criticised the way sketching was taught in the school, naming W. H. Charpentier in particular. In February 1891, following the resignation of Mr Kingsmill, he was put in charge of the Art class at Hobart Technical College and formally appointed that same month. He took a year's leave of absence in 1896 to study at the Lambeth School of Sculpture, then applied for an extension, as he was working as an assistant to Edward Onslow Ford in London, also gaining casting experience at the Albion Art Bronze Foundry, while Mrs Tranthim-Fryer was studying singing and harmony with Dr Churchill Sibley. He resigned his Hobart position sometime in 1897.

Tranthim-Fryer returned to Australia around New Year's Day 1900, having gained several distinctions while in England, as had his wife, who furthered her musical studies under Tosti and Santley. After a brief return to Hobart, they moved to Melbourne, where he opened a studio in the Queen's Buildings, Rathdown Street. and exhibited with the Victorian Artists' Society. and the Yarra Sculptors' Society, founded by C. D. Richardson. In 1903 he was appointed Art Director of the Sale School of Mines and Arts, and in June 1904 was appointed director of the Working Men's College and School of Art, Horsham. In December 1905 he was appointed art teacher of Gordon Technical College, Geelong, and in May 1908 was appointed that college's delegate to the board of the Technical Art Teachers' Association.

Melbourne's Eastern Suburbs Technical College was founded in 1908 by a local committee with support from the Premier, Thomas Bent, and a site in John Street, Hawthorn was vested in George Swinburne MLA, Minister for Agriculture and Minister for Water Supply as provisional trustee. Swinburne and his wife were its principal subscribers, with £1,000 each. The first meeting of its council, elected by subscribers, was held in July and voted to proceed with its construction without delay. In December 1908 Tranthim-Fryer was appointed director on a salary of £300 p.a. and the opening set for 10 February 1909. The college was handed over to Government control in October 1912 and renamed Swinburne Technical College. £10,111 had been spent on its establishment, of which £3,718 came from private donations, and the remainder from the Government. Most employees, including Tranthim-Fryer, were retained under the new regime. Under his guidance, the school became a respected institution.

He retired, due to ill-health, on 30 June 1928, and died at his residence, "Bush Home", Croydon Road, Bayswater a few weeks later. His remains were cremated at the Fawkner Cemetery.

== Other interests ==
Tranthim-Fryer was a capable cellist, and accompanied his wife's singing at social occasions.

== Memberships and recognition ==
- Tranthim-Fryer was a founding council member and president of the Melbourne Arts and Crafts Society 1900–1917.
- He was a member of the council of the Victorian Artists' Society council, and showed busts and repoussé copper work at the society's exhibitions
- He exhibited at the Yarra Sculptors Society.
- A memorial plaque at Swinburne University of Technology, created by Paul Raphael Montford reads:

"In memory of John Robertson Tranthim-Fryer, the first Director of this College 1908–1928. His rare gifts and charming personality were an inspiration to students and staff alike. Greatly respected — A Christian Gentleman. Died July 13th 1928."

== Some works ==
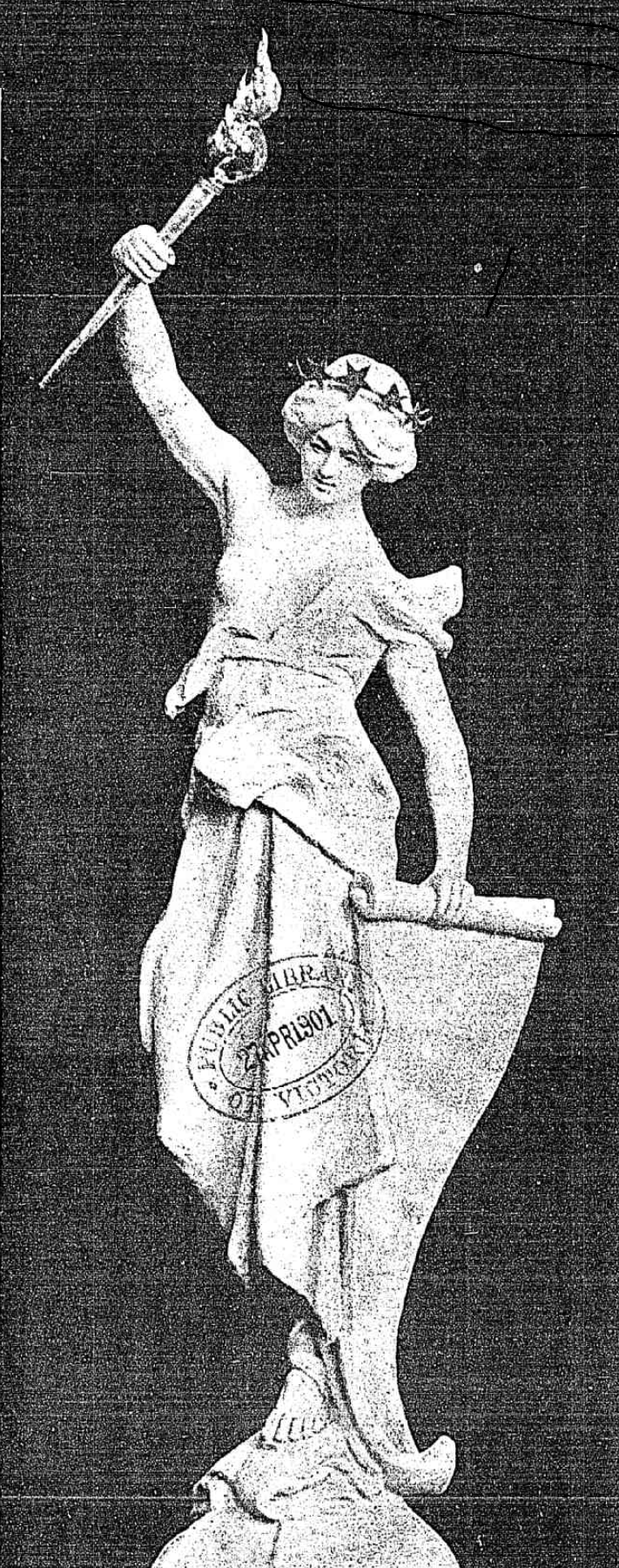
Federation by J. R. Tranthim-Fryer

- Statue of Queen Victoria at Hyde Park, Sydney, unveiled 1888.
- Memorial plaque to George William Torrance at Trinity College, Melbourne
- Bronze statue The Spirit of the Commonwealth or Federation
- Repoussé plaque, with Hebrew script and translation "Honour Thy Father and Mother" at a new children's ward at the Alfred Hospital.
- A similar plaque in memory of Queen Victoria at the Melbourne Hospital for Sick Children.
- Aristocrat chez lui, ouvrier chez nous (c. 1910), donated in 1984 to the National Gallery of Australia, by Adelaide Violet Hebbard "in memory of her friendship with Ethel Tranthim-Fryer".
- Some work is held by the Tasmanian Museum & Art Gallery, Hobart.

== Family ==
On 30 September 1890, John Robertson Tranthim-Fryer married Charlotte Alice Bechervaise (c. 1863 – 8 April 1927), only daughter of W. P. Bechervaise, Postmaster and Telegraph Manager, Ballarat, Victoria. Mrs Tranthim-Fryer A.R.A.M. was a fine singer and highly qualified singer and teacher. She died at their home at 4, St Columb's street, Hawthorn, after five years' retirement. They had a son Philip or Phillip Cecil Tranthim-Fryer (17 November 1901 – 1988), who was also a singer, but not professionally.

He married again, on 4 April 1928, to Ethel Andrews, three months before his death. Andrews was in 1904 one of Mrs Tranthim-Fryer's singing students.
