= Radiant House =

Building in Westminster, London, England

- 34–38, Mortimer Street
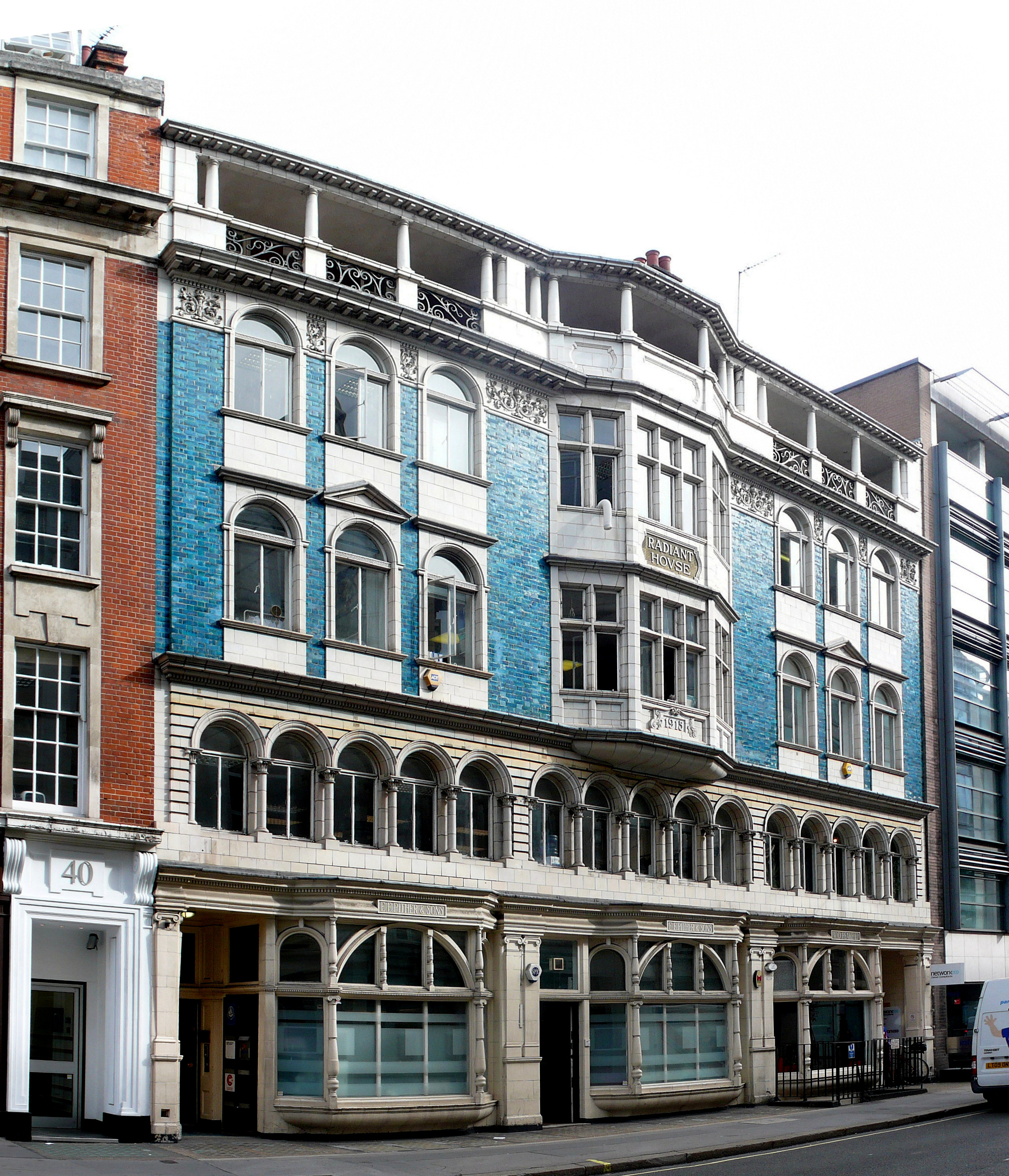
- Interactive map of the Radiant House area

General information
- Location: Radiant House, 34-38 Mortimer Street W1W 7RG, London, England
- Coordinates: 51°31′05″N 0°08′24″W
- Opened: January 1915

Technical details
- Floor count: 5

Listed Building – Grade II
- Official name: 34-38, Mortimer Street
- Designated: 1 December 1987
- Reference no.: 1267275

Radiant House is an architecturally notable building in Mortimer Street, in the City of Westminster, London. It is a grade II listed building.

The building was commissioned by Ernest Eugene Pither to honour the memory of Sophia Elizabeth Pither, née Bézier, and it was completed in January 1915. The building was designed by Francis Léon Pither, although a plaque on the building shows "F. M. Elgood, FRIBA" as the architect.
