= Alastair Service =

British abortion activist and architectural historian

Alastair Stanley Douglas Service CBE (8 May 1933 – 20 March 2013) was a British abortion law reformer, family planning advocate and architectural historian.

== Biography ==
=== Personal life ===
Service was born in 1933 in Hampstead, London to Scottish parents. He spent the duration of the Second World War in Midlothian before returning after its end. Service attended Westminster School and read modern history at Queen's College, Oxford, although without graduating. He worked for around eight years in banking and export finance. He was awarded a CBE in 1995 and made member of the Royal Victorian Order at the 2007 Birthday Honours. He married Louisa Anne Hemming in 1959 with whom he had two children, the two separated in 1976 and divorced in 1984. In 1992 he married Zandria Madeleine Pauncefort a former colleague from the Family Planning Association. In his later years, Service lived in Avebury, Wiltshire, dying there in 2013 following years of illness after a car accident.

=== Abortion and family planning ===
Service's involvement with abortion law reforms began in 1963, attending an Abortion Law Reform Association (ALRA) meeting on behalf of his mother-in-law. He subsequently joined the committee and became a parliamentary campaigner, involved in David Steel's private member's bill resulting in the Abortion Act of 1967. After its passing, Service was involved in ensuring the bill was not watered down or abolished.

Service was also involved in the family-planning movement, chairing the Birth Control Campaign from 1970 to 1974. He also became chair of the Family Planning Association in 1975 and general secretary from 1980 to 1989. He would later recount ""how ridiculous it would be now, to have a situation where a woman was able to get an NHS abortion, but could not get family planning on the NHS".

=== Architectural history ===
Alastair Service also had a career as an architectural historian, with a particular interest in Victorian and Edwardian architecture, defining the latter as the "Grand Manner". Service was interested in architectural preservation of historic buildings, a member of the Victorian Society's main committee from 1977 to 1995, and worked extensively on the society's publications.

Among his most significant works are Edwardian Architecture and its Origins (1975), Edwardian Architecture (1977), London, 1900 (1979), and Victorian and Edwardian Hampstead (1989) within which he provided an account of C. H. B. Quennell's work in Hampstead.
