= Olive Ashworth =

Australian photographer (1915–2000)

- Born: 1915; Brisbane
- Died: 2000 (aged 84–85)
- Known for: Commercial and Mural art, textile design, Photography

Olive Ashworth (1915–2000) was an Australian artist, textile designer and photographer.

She is acknowledged as a significant contributor to Australian textile design during the 1950s.

== Collections ==
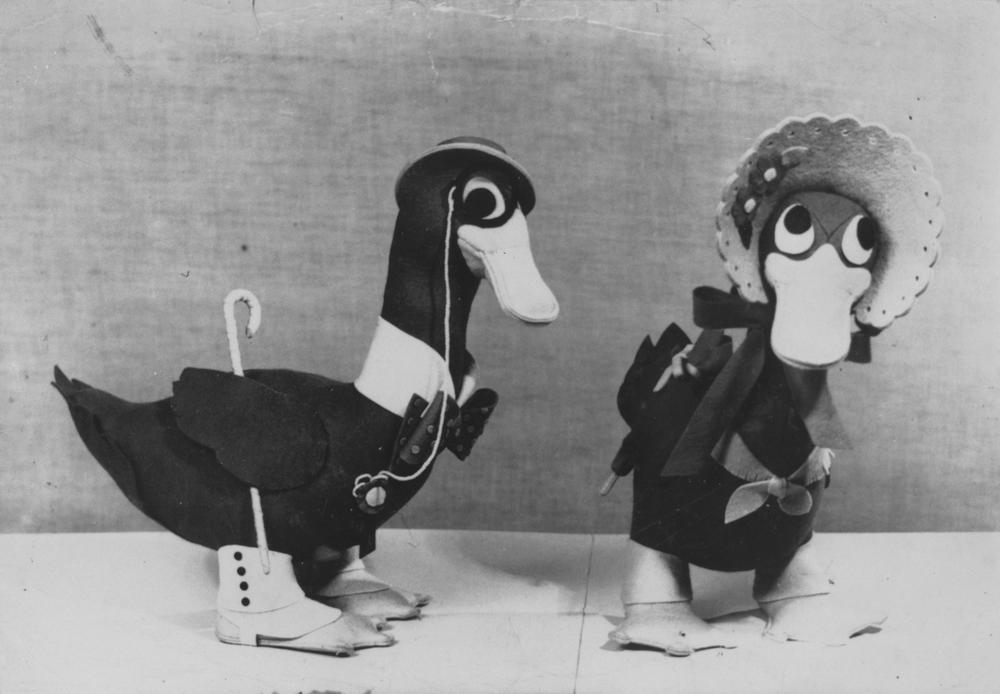
Two soft toys created by Olive Ashworth

Ashworth's works are held in the collections of the National Gallery of Australia (including Aquarelle, Mushroom coral, and Reef fantasy), and the Queensland Art Gallery (includes Design for Coral garden, Design for Reef fantasy, Design for Queensland, and Great Barrier Reef neck tie).

The State Library of Queensland also has a pair of toy ducks designed and made by Ashworth.

The Olive Ashworth Textile Collection is held by the Queensland Museum.

== Exhibitions ==
=== Group ===
- Women Artists of North Queensland, Perc Tucker Regional Gallery (1995)
- Women Hold Up Half The Sky, National Gallery of Australia (1995)
- New Woman, Museum of Brisbane 2019)

== Significance ==
On Ashworth, the Queensland Art Gallery wrote: "Olive Ashworth is one of the few Australians, and the only Queensland-based artist, to contribute significantly to textile design in the 1950s".
