= Frederick Charles Ward =

Australian interior designer (1900–1990)

- Born: 26 July 1900; Canberra, East Melbourne
- Died: 25 July 1990 (aged 89); Queanbeyan
- Employer: Australian National University
- Awards: Member of the Order of the British Empire (Industrial design, Mr Frederick Charles WARD, 1970)

Frederick Charles Ward (1900–1990) was a furniture and interior designer in Australia. Ward worked with native wood in his long career.

His designs were installed in the creation of the Australian National University campus, where he also served as the first head of the design unit.

Ward was commissioned to design furniture for prominent public buildings, including the National Library, and the Australian pavilion at Expo '67, Montreal, Quebec.

He acted as a design consultant to the Reserve Bank in Sydney. He was consulted by the Department of Aircraft Production in production of timber-framed aircraft during WWII; this type of construction was used for the Beaufighter and the Mosquito Bomber.

Ward was one of the founders of the Society of Designers for Industry, which later became the Design Institute of Australia. He was appointed a Member of the Order of the British Empire in the 1970 New Year Honours.
