= Finsbury Library =

Public library in the London Borough of Islington, England

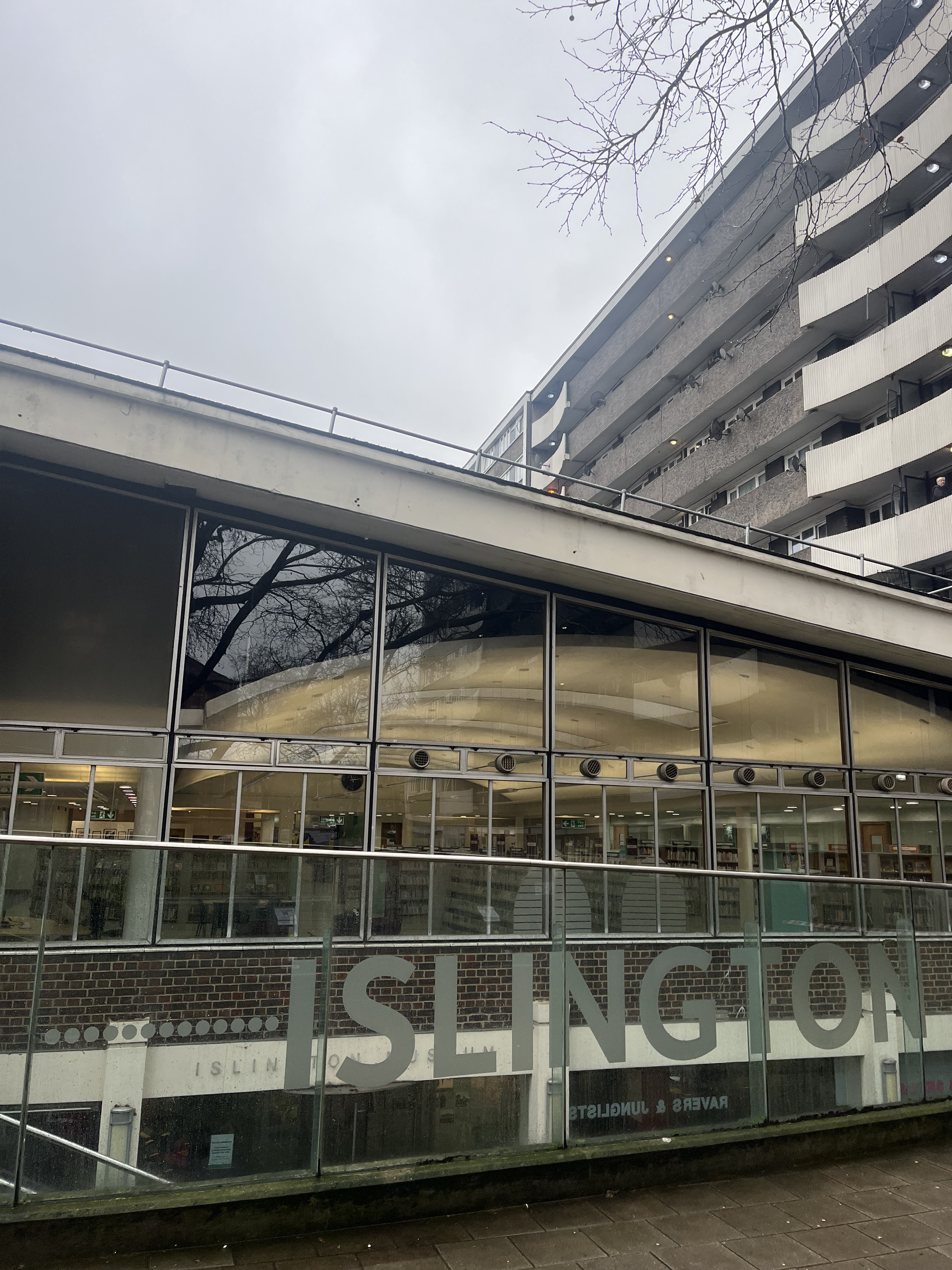
- The library in 2026
- 51°31′35″N 0°6′15″W
- Location: 245 St John Street; London, United Kingdom
- Type: Public library
- Established: 1967
- Branch of: Islington Libraries

Collection
- Size: 25,738

Access and use
- Circulation: 55,481 (2024/25)

Other information
- Director: Sub Kapas
- Public transit access: Farringdon; Angel

Finsbury Library is a public library in the London Borough of Islington, England.

Located at 245 St John Street, it is one of the borough's largest libraries and serves as a multi-purpose community hub, housing the Islington Museum, Local History Centre, and Islington Computer Skills Centre. The current building opened in 1967, replacing the historic Clerkenwell Free Library. The new building's design embodied the "library of light" style of the 1960s.

== History ==
=== Clerkenwell Free Library (1890-1967) ===
The origins of Finsbury Library can be traced to the original Clerkenwell Free Library (from 1900 Finsbury Public Library), which was opened on Skinner Street by the Lord Mayor of London on 10 October 1890. This library was established following the adoption of the Public Libraries Acts by the Clerkenwell Vestry on 13 December 1887, by a majority of 321 votes.

The library was in red brick, with three floors over a basement. It included a ground-floor lending library and newspaper reading room, as well as a first-floor reference library and reading room.

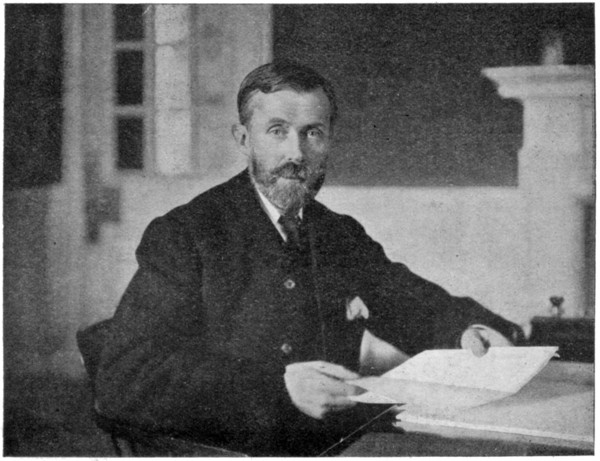
James Duff Brown, first librarian of the Clerkenwell Library

The first librarian James Duff Brown (previously at the Mitchell Library in Glasgow) introduced three key innovations in managing the library space.

- Most famously, he introduced open-shelving in 1894, allowing patrons to browse and select books directly, rather than requesting them at a desk. This led the library's reputation as the "first modern library in Great Britain," but initially was criticized for being "an incitement to chaos, crime and inappropriate fraternisation".
- Brown also opened a dedicated children's library in the basement in 1898, one of the first in the country.
- Finally, Brown also established a tradition of public exhibitions in the reference section, including displaying Old Master works.

Clerkenwell was the first London library to employ female assistants. At the time, the librarian reported "no decrease in wages as was prophesied, nor has the work of the library suffered from the frivolity said to be inseparable from the female character."

Its design was heavily influenced by American innovations in libraries. Brown was inspired to adopt the open-shelving system after attending the International Congress of Librarians in Chicago and, on the way, seeing it in operation in Boston, Buffalo, Cleveland, and Pawtucket. Following this trip, he also noted that American libraries hired more female employees, and had a more coherent space within the "education machinery" for children.

When the Metropolitan Borough of Finsbury was created in 1900, replacing the Clerkenwell Vestry, the library became part of the new borough's library service.

=== Current building (1967-present) ===
In the 1940s, the Skinners' Company Estate was designated for redevelopment, with plans to demolish the existing library building and create a new, larger central library for the Borough. The new library was designed by Ludwig Franck, and was opened by then Minister of Power, Richard Marsh, on 11 March 1967, at an estimated cost of £225,000. By the time of the new library's completion, the borough of Finsbury had been merged into Islington (in 1965) -- and Islington already had a central library. As such, Finsbury Library is a branch library with the capacity of a central library: it has a large lecture and events hall, music area, reference room, public toilets, as well as the sizable lending library.

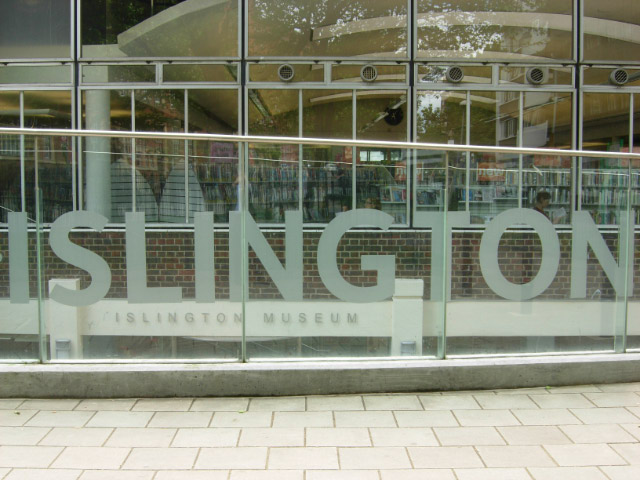
The main reading room has a barrel vaulted ceiling, and a full glass wall on the Northern end.

The library emerges from under the new housing estate, and flows through to St. John's Street, whose curve it then follows. Its design is consistent with the modernist design of the estate, but with additional spots of color, such as marine-blue mosaic tiles that cover supporting columns for the upper floor. One of the most striking design components of the library is its lending space, which was built with a shallow, barrel vaulted ceiling that lets light in through a number of curved skylights, as well as through a full glass wall on the northern end of the building.

Alistair Black names Finsbury Library as an example of "libraries of light" -- a type of new public library building that emerged in the United Kingdom in the long 1960s. Black highlights how these libraries were both "light of weight" externally, and were "open, bright and luminous" internally, with new lighting technologies, glass, and less ornate furniture and fittings. These design choices were deeply influenced by American and Scandinavian public libraries, notably in terms of the lighting systems, and open-plan design. Holbon Library (1959-60), nearby, implemented a number of these changes, and likely influenced Franck.

Black argues that these new buildings reflected shifts from the pre-war libraries (such as Islington's Central Library), in line with the attempted "social, economic and cultural modernisation of Britain in the long 1960s, including the changing posture of the library profession." This included a shift in funding structures, in line with the growth of the welfare state -- less reliance on donors, and a desire to highlight openness, accessibility and permanence. Other still-visitable "libraries of light" include Bourne Hall Library, Bromley Central Library, Holborn Library, Stockton-on-Tees Central Library, and Swiss Cottage Library; demolished ones include Birmingham Central Library, Newcastle City Library, and Norwich Central Library.

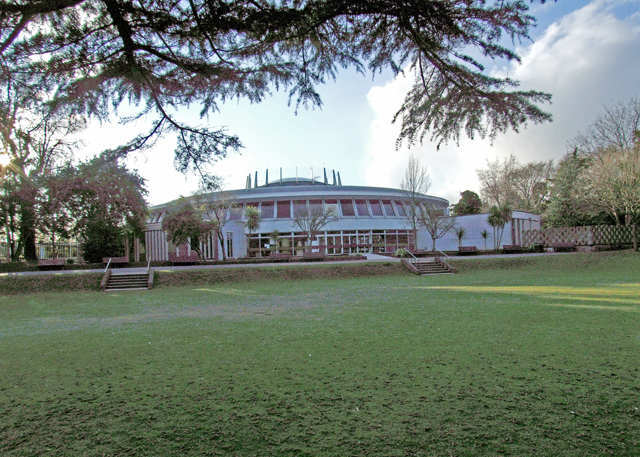
Bourne Hall Library (opened 1970)

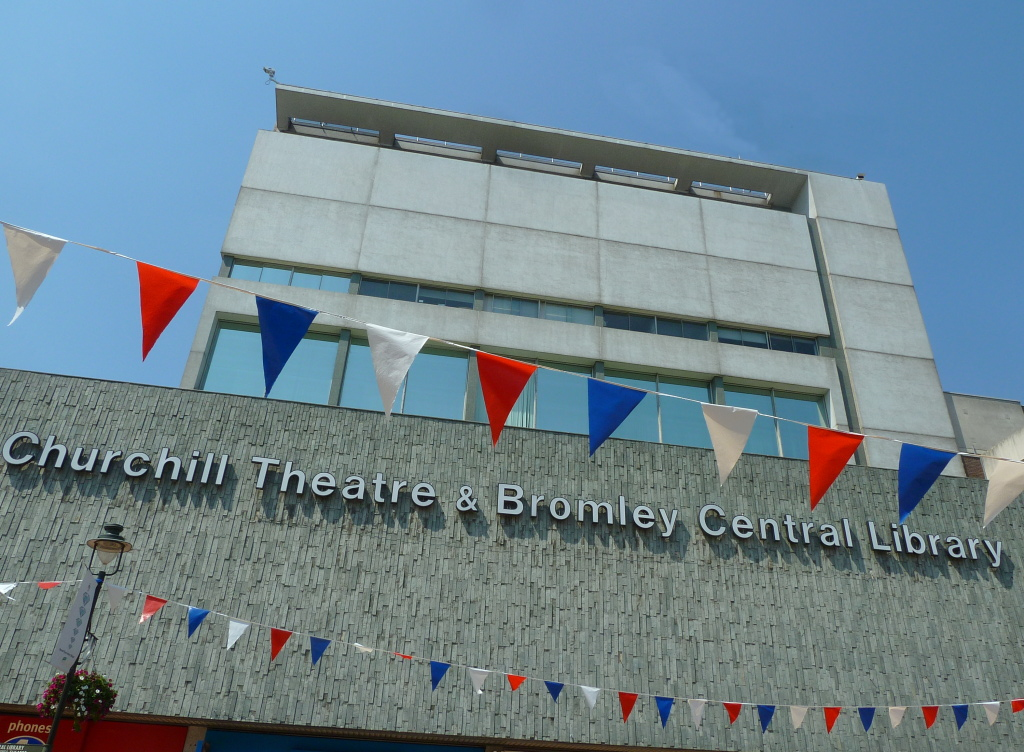
Bromley Central (1977)

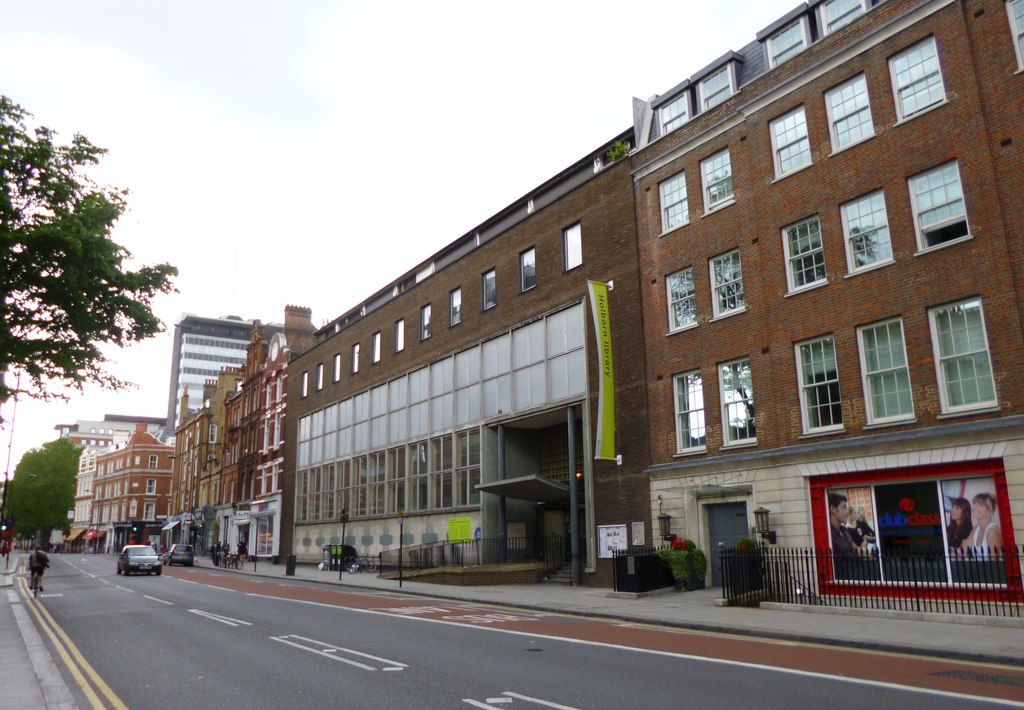
Holborn Central (1960)

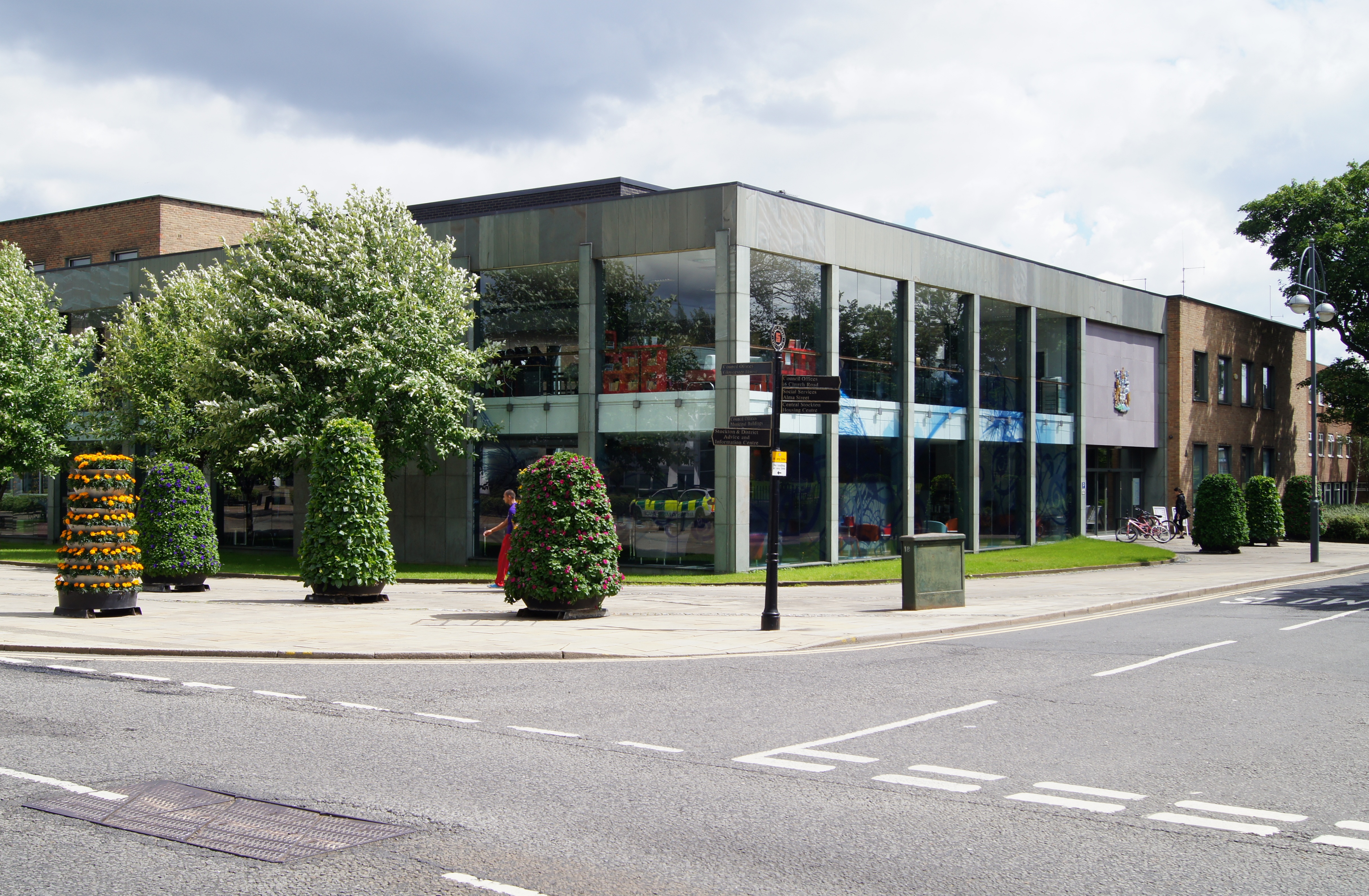
Stockton-on-Tees Central (1969)

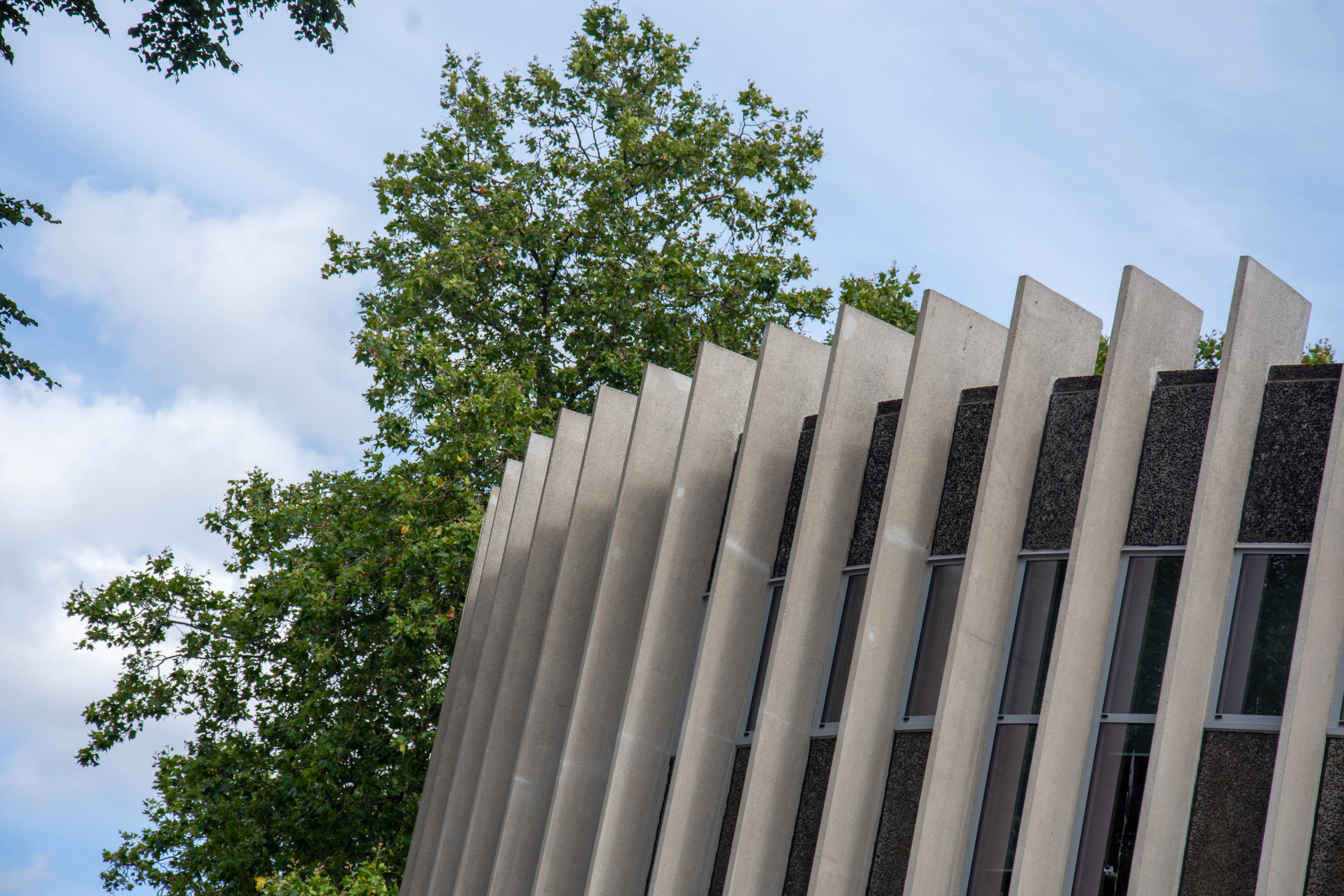
Hamstead Central / Swiss Cottage (1964)

==== Inclusion of other cultural services, 50th anniversary ====
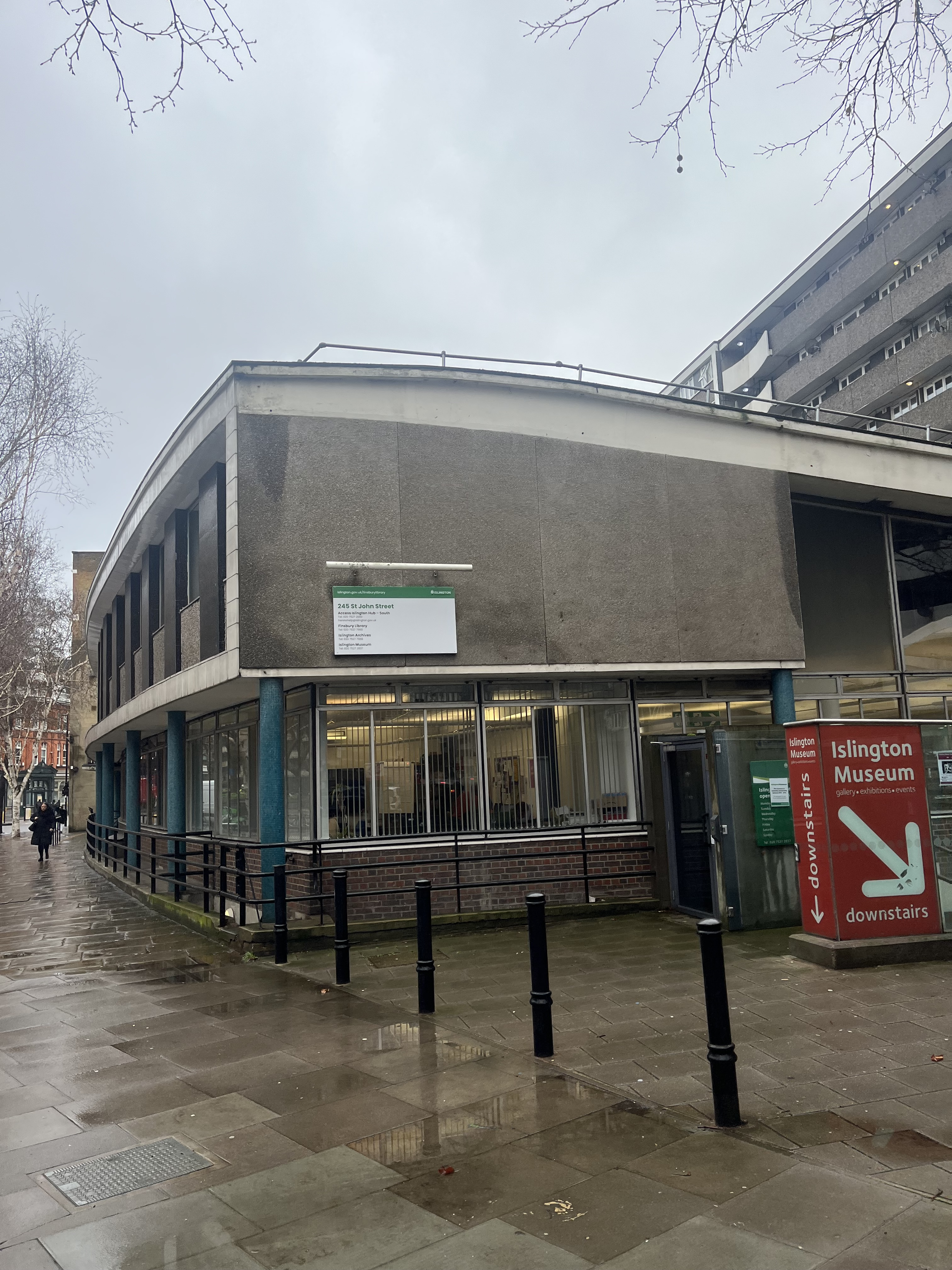
The library now includes the Islington Museum in its basement. The Skinner estate is visible in the background.

In 2003, the library underwent a major refurbishment and was reopened by broadcaster Janet Street-Porter. The renovation brought together several cultural services under one roof, including the newly established Islington Local History Centre, which united the local history collections of the former Metropolitan Boroughs of Islington and Finsbury. The library underwent another refurbishment in 2015, which improved facilities, added more study space, and resulted in extended opening hours.

The library celebrated its 50th anniversary in 2017 with a special exhibition documenting the design and development of both the library and the surrounding estate.

In 2022, a new bench and planter was unveiled outside the library, as part of GreenSCIES, a project to bring greener and more affordable energy to the borough.

== Services ==
"The library is still such an important community hub because it is one of the few non-judgemental spaces of society. People come in here, have free access to thousands of books, and staff are friendly to them, no matter who they are or where they come from."

— Chris Milliner, former manager of the Finsbury Library

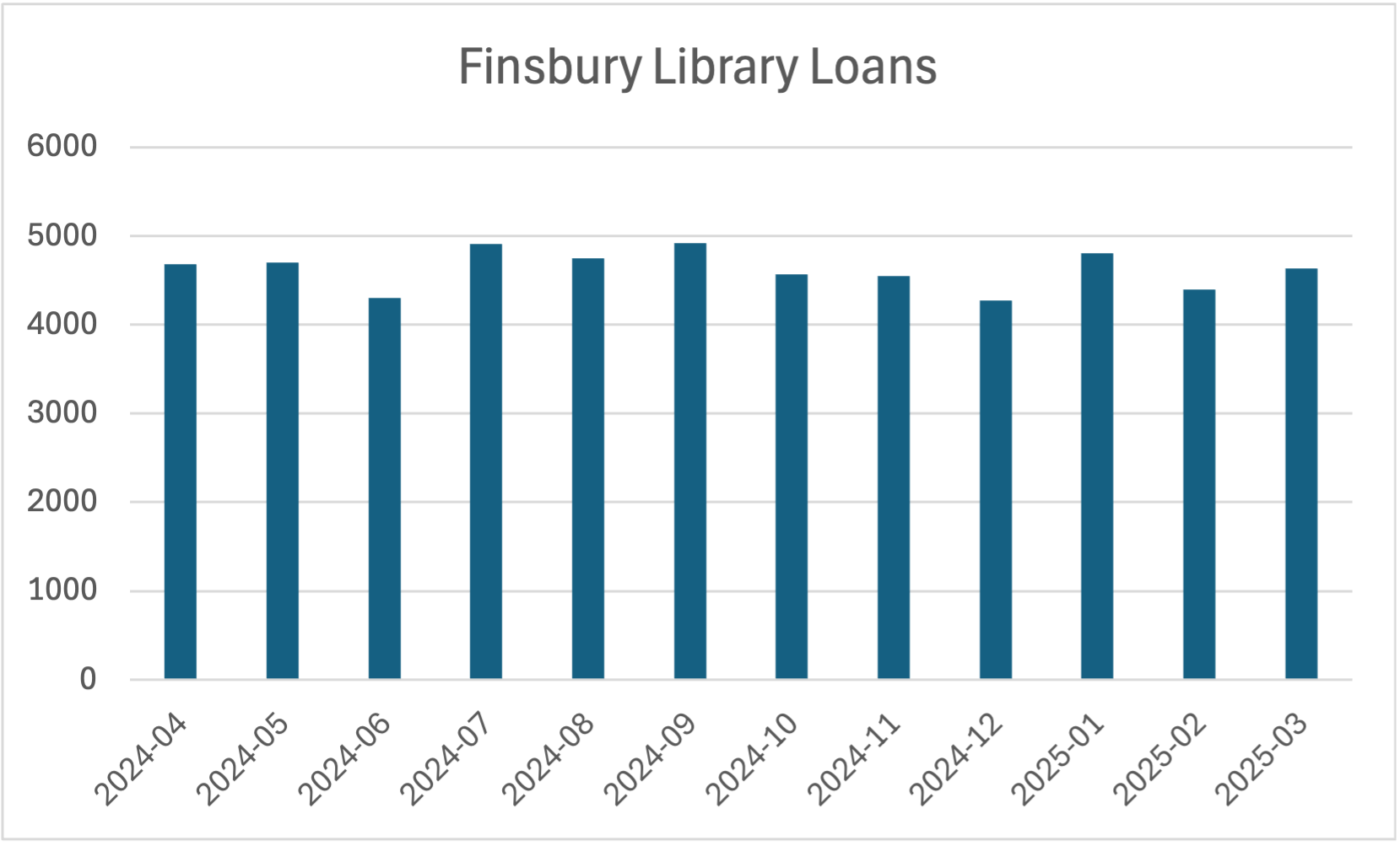
Loans increase over the summer months.

In 2024/25, the Library had 2,299 active members (5th in the service), and 118,875 visits over the year (2nd in the service). On average, it performed 4,623 loans per month (4th in the service), reaching nearly 5,000 loans in the summer months.

On top of serving as a lending library, Finsbury Library provides access to 9 free public computers, free wifi, and printing facilities. The library also hosts a wide array of events. In 2024/25, these included Digital Upskilling sessions via the Computer Skills Centre, and an art workshop with royal portrait artist Phillip Butah. In 2024/25, Finsbury Library welcomed 5,251 attendees for events – 8% of attendees to all Islington Library events.

The library building also houses a number of other institutions, including the Islington Local History Centre, the Islington Museum, the Islington Computer Skills Centre and the area Housing Office.

== See also ==
- Islington Borough Council
- Islington Libraries
