= Finsbury Estate =

Housing estate in London

Finsbury estate
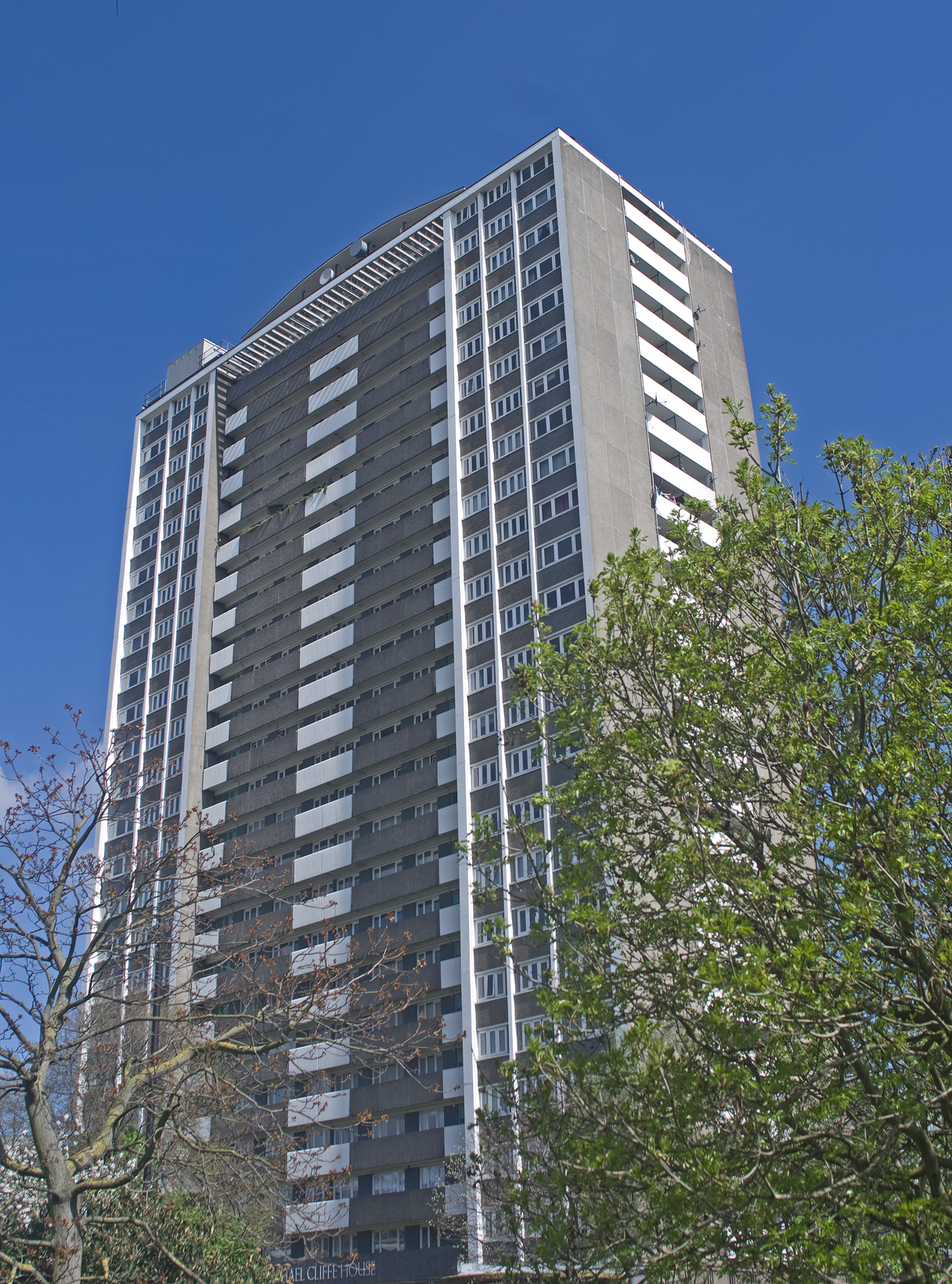

General information
- Location: St John's Street & Skinner Street; London, UK
- Coordinates: 51.526°N 0.1058°W
- Opened: 1967
- Governing body: Islington London Borough Council

Other information
- Public transit: Farringdon; Angel

Finsbury Estate is a large-scale housing estate in the Clerkenwell area of London, England (in the former Borough of Finsbury), comprising four purpose-built blocks of flats located on a level site, providing 451 residences. Patrick Coman House and Michael Cliffe House are high-rise blocks of 9 and 25 storeys respectively, while Joseph Trotter House and Charles Townsend House are of four storeys.

Amenities include a community centre, below-ground car parking, a ball-games area and a playground area. The estate has two cultural centers on the property: the Finsbury library (including the Local History Centre), and the Islington Museum.

== Architecture ==
Finsbury Estate is a 'mixed development' of the High Modern period, and served as a redevelopment of the Skinners' Company Estate. It was designed by Emberton, Franck & Tardrew in 1965 for Finsbury Borough Council, though completed after Finsbury had been absorbed into the new Metropolitan Borough of Islington.

Franck had worked for Tecton, and there are similarities with the architecture of Tecton estates such as Spa Green Estate, as pointed out by the Survey of London. Through the configuration of the four blocks, two large open spaces have been created, characterized by two predominant inward-looking convex spaces defined by the surrounding blocks of flats. Main entrances to the estate are on St John Street, where the Finsbury Library is located, and on Skinner Street to the south-west.

== Cultural Amenities ==
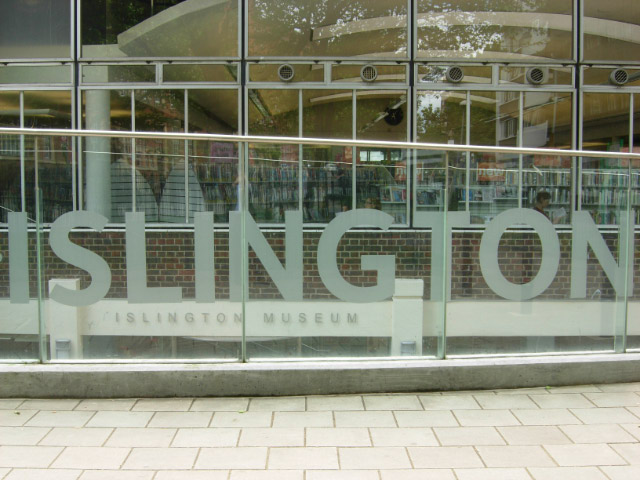
Front of the Finsbury Library

Library

Finsbury Library was designed by Ludwig Franck, and replaced the historic Clerkenwell Free Library. It was opened by then Minister of Power, Richard Marsh, on 11 March 1967, at an estimated cost of £225,000. Its design is consistent with the modernist design of the estate, but with additional spots of color, such as marine-blue mosaic tiles that cover supporting columns for the upper flour. Alistair Black names Finsbury Library as an example of "libraries of light" -- it is both "light of weight" externally, and "open, bright and luminous" internally, with new lighting technologies, glass, and less ornate furniture and fittings.

The library is the second-most visited branch in the Islington Libraries service. It also includes the Islington Computer Skills Centre and the Local History Centre.

=== Islington Museum ===
Islington Council received lottery-money funding to develop a new Islington Museum which opened beneath the library on the estate in 2008. A former museum at the Islington Town Hall closed on 15 December 2006. The museum houses a gallery covering nine themes on local and social history: childhood, food and drink, fashion, leisure, healthcare, radicals, caring, home and wartime.

== Accommodation ==
- Patrick Coman House: 9 storeys, comprising 143 flats, 48 3-bedroom, 80 2-bedroom, 15 bed-sitting.
- Charles Townsend House: 4 storeys to the south of the estate, comprising 52 flats: 6 4-bedroom, 6 2-bedroom, 24 one-bedroom and 16 bed-sitting.
- Michael Cliffe House: 25-storey tower block, 185 flats, 31 3-bedroom, 78 2-bedroom, 76 1-bedroom.
- Joseph Trotter Close: 4 storeys comprising 15 ground-floor maisonettes for large families, with their own front gardens and private gardens at rear. 71 flats: 27 4-bedroom, 13 3-bedroom, 9 2-bedroom, 1 1-bedroom and 21 bed-sitting.

== Cultural associations ==
- Michael Cliffe House is named after a former mayor of Finsbury Borough Council.
- Joseph Trotter House is also named after a former Mayor of Finsbury; his son, also named Joseph Trotter, later served as Mayor of Islington. The family name was then later carried on by his great grandson Joseph Trotter.
- Channel 4's award-winning British sitcom Peep Show, series 1 episode 5 was filmed at Super Hans's fictional flat at Michael Cliffe House on the Finsbury estate.

== Controversies ==
Michael Cliffe House was a venue for suicide by jumping until access to high open balconies was restricted.

EC1/Easy Cash is a gang based on the Bourne, Margery Street, Kings Square and Finsbury estates.

In 2014, the police smashed their way into three flats in Patrick Coman House, on the Finsbury Estate, off St John’s Way. In one, where two women and a newborn baby were sleeping, officers found a shotgun, a large hunting knife, a flick knife and a rucksack with more than 100 wraps and a “massive lump” of crack cocaine with an estimated street value of up to £100,000.

== See also ==
- List of Brutalist structures
