= Greenwich Leisure Limited =

British sports and leisure venue operator

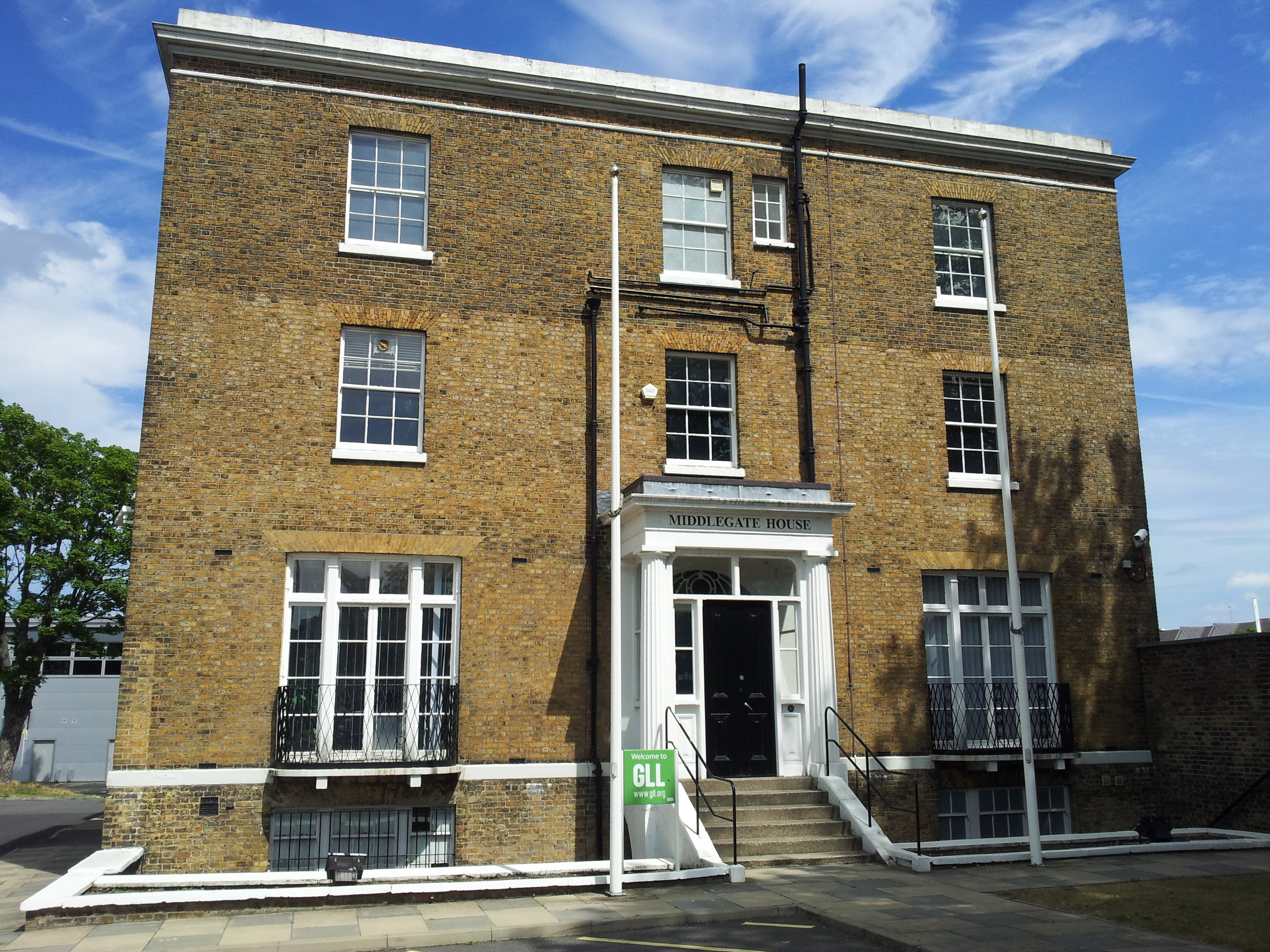
- Type: Industrial and Provident Society
- Industry: Sport, leisure and culture
- Founded: 1993
- Headquarters: Royal Arsenal; London, SE18; United Kingdom
- Key people: Philip Donnay - CEO, Andy Bindon - Deputy CEO, Mark Sesnan OBE - Founder
- Revenue: £306 million (2022)
- Number of employees: 13,100
- Website: www.gll.org

Greenwich Leisure Ltd (GLL), operating under the brand Better, is a British social enterprise organisation which runs sport and leisure facilities, on behalf of local authorities in the United Kingdom.

It has operated the GLL Sport Foundation since 2007, providing support to young athletes and is one of the largest independent athlete schemes in the UK.

== History ==
GLL was established to run local services in the London Borough of Greenwich in 1993 as a non-profit distributing co-operative. In the following years it started to run services for other local authorities. It also manages Crystal Palace National Sports Centre. On 9 January 2012 it was announced that GLL would be managing the Aquatics Centre and the "copper box" Multi-Use Arena of the London 2012 Olympic Games from 2013 for 10 years.

In June 2012 GLL rebranded all their centres under the "Better" brand.

In 2017, GLL were handed a 10-year contract to take over management of the Bromley Borough Libraries Service.

In April 2022, GLL became the largest operator of London 2012 legacy venues, when it entered a new partnership with Lee Valley Regional Park Authority. These included London 2012 venues at Lee Valley Velo Park, Lee Valley Hockey & Tennis Centre, and Lee Valley White Water Centre.

The social enterprise is the largest operator of public libraries in the United Kingdom, having expanded into the sector as part of a broader shift towards social enterprise delivery models in the wake of public sector austerity measures. The organisation took on its first library contract with the Royal Borough of Greenwich in 2012, followed by additional contracts, including Wandsworth, focusing on preserving services, staffing conditions, and opening hours. Unlike private outsourcing firms, GLL has positioned itself as a not-for-profit social enterprise committed to community benefit, resisting closures and maintaining access while experimenting with sustainable, community-focused library models.

In 2024, Swindon Borough Council extended its partnership with GLL by removing mutual break clauses from their agreement, allowing the provider to continue operating six major leisure sites in the borough until October 2039. The sites include the Link Centre, Croft Leisure Centre, Delta Tennis Centre, Dorcan Recreation Centre, Haydon Wick Leisure Centre and the Health Hydro.

As part of the renewed agreement, GLL and the council committed to co-investment, with £1.3 million allocated for improvements at the Link Centre and £115,000 towards the refurbishment of the Health Hydro. GLL had already funded the replacement of the Link Centre’s ice rink, which was damaged by flooding in 2023.

In 2024, GLL was awarded a 10-year contract, with a possible five-year extension, to manage key leisure services in the Metropolitan Borough of Gateshead. The agreement covered the Gateshead International Stadium and leisure centres in Blaydon, Dunston and Heworth. Gateshead Council stated the decision was driven by financial pressures and aimed at achieving long-term savings. The move followed controversy surrounding Gateshead FC’s ineligibility for the National League play-offs due to licensing issues linked to the stadium, which the new agreement has resolved. GLL will also manage tennis courts in Derwent, Chopwell and Marley Hill parks as part of the deal.

The restructuring followed earlier closures of Gateshead Leisure Centre and Birtley Pool in 2023. Both have since reopened under community ownership.

== Structure ==
GLL is a staff-led 'leisure trust', social enterprise structured as an industrial and provident society for the benefit of the community. The members of the co-operative and therefore owners of the company are the workers of GLL.
