= Carl Ludwig Franck =

Carl Ludwig Philipp Franck (25 September 1904 – 20 February 1985) was a German-British architect who practiced in the United Kingdom from the 1930s to the 1960s. He was a member of the architectural practice Tecton from the late 1930s to its dissolution in 1948. A highly skilled draftsman, he provided detailed drawings of many of Tecton's most famous projects.

The youngest son of painter Philipp Franck, Carl Ludwig was born in Berlin and studied jurisprudence in Würzburg and Freiburg from 1922 to 1926. Continuing his studies under the architect and artist Hans Poelzig, he spent another four years, 1926–1930 at the Technische Hochschule in Charlottenburg (now Technische Universität Berlin) and, for the next two years, until 1932, worked as an assistant at the Franz Masser architectural firm. A scholarship enabled him to study in Rome during 1932–33, until opening his own architectural firm in 1936.

Concern over the safety of his Jewish wife and their family in Hitler's Germany prompted the move to England in September 1937. Though initially interned as an enemy alien during World War II for six months, in Hutchinson Camp on the Isle of Man, when he shared a room with Fred Uhlman, he later assisted Ove Arup in ARP and engineering projects. In his post-Tecton career he designed the Finsbury Estate in Islington, including the Finsbury Library. He was the author of The villas of Frascati, 1550–1750, London, Tiranti, 1966, a revised English translation of his earlier German study Die Barockvillen in Frascati, Munich, Deutschkunstverlag, 1956.

Carl Ludwig Franck died in London at the age of 80.

== Associated with Lubetkin ==
- Ove Arup
- Berthold Lubetkin
- Denys Lasdun
- Douglas Carr Bailey
- Francis Skinner (architect)
