= James Duff Brown =

Scottish librarian (1862–1914)

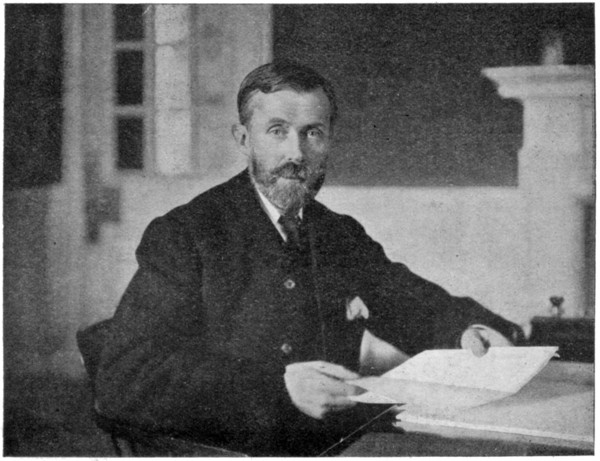
- Born: 1862; Edinburgh
- Died: 1914 (aged 51–52); London
- Occupations: Bibliographer; Librarian
- Known for: Innovator of open access libraries; author of The Subject Classification

James Duff Brown (1862–1914) was a British librarian, information theorist, music biographer and educationalist. Most of his life was spent in London.

== Biography ==
He was born in Edinburgh, but after beginning his library career in Glasgow, he subsequently moved to London. He was appointed on 27 September 1888 by the Clerkenwell Library Commissioners as the first librarian. He subsequently worked for the Clerkenwell Vestry and the Finsbury Metropolitan Borough Council. He devised three classification systems: Quinn/Brown (1898), Adjustable classification (1898) and Subject Classification (1906). The latter system was for municipal libraries and was informed by his advocacy of open shelf access of books in the UK. Indeed, he was [t]he pioneer of this new system [while he was librarian] of Clerkenwell, where the first experiment in open access was launched in May, 1893. This was referred to as "safe guarded open access". Brown was inspired to adopt the open-shelving system after attending the International Congress of Librarians in Chicago and, on the way, seeing it in operation in Boston, Buffalo, Cleveland, and Pawtucket. Following this trip, he also noted that American libraries hired more female employees, and had a more coherent space within the "education machinery" for children.

Alongside his classification work, he produced a standard textbook on librarianship (the Manual of Library Economy). In 1898, he was threatened with a libel action by Charles Goss, over a polemic defending open access, and he was forced to apologise. He further contributed to theoretical journals and also produced correspondence courses in librarianship "upon which most British librarians depended for their professional studies until the 1930s". From 1905 as Chief Librarian of the public libraries in the Metropolitan Borough of Islington he largely built up their collection and service.

Brown was also the founder of "Pseudonyms," a "secret society" dining club.

== Ideas ==
His work in classification attempted to deal with the problem of the shelf arrangement of interdisciplinary works, and how to ensure that works on the same topic would be found in the same place. Part of his attempt to deal with this was to create synthesised notation (a rarity among classification systems in his day) to allow composite classmarks to be created.

Clare Beghtol notes He tried to bring all works on a concrete topic together notationally so that, for example, "at E917 for Coffee must be collected everything related to coffee, regardless of standpoint, form or other qualification but it must not be put under such headings as Tropical Agriculture, Beverages, Crops, Foods, Drugs, Ethics, Bibliography, Customs, or any other general head."

== Publications ==
- 1886: Biographical Dictionary of Musicians
- 1893: Guide to the Formation of a Music Library
- 1897: British Musical Biography with Stephen Samuel Stratton
- 1898: Manual of Library Classification and Shelf Arrangement
- 1901: Characteristic Songs and Dances of All Nations with Alfred Edward Moffat
- 1903: Manual of Library Economy (7 later eds.)
- 1906: Manual of Practical Bibliography
- 1906: Subject Classification (1st ed. 1906; 2nd ed. 1914; 3rd ed. (rev. by J. D. Stewart) 1939)
- 1907: The Small Library: a guide to the collection and care of books
- 1910: Characteristic Songs and Dances of All Ages
- 1912: Library Classification and Cataloguing

== See also ==
- Finsbury Library
- Islington Libraries
