= Philipp Franck =

German painter

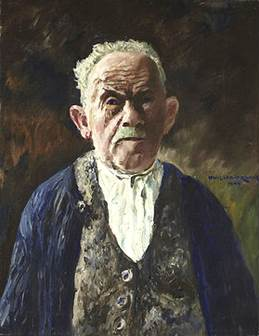
Self-portrait (1943)

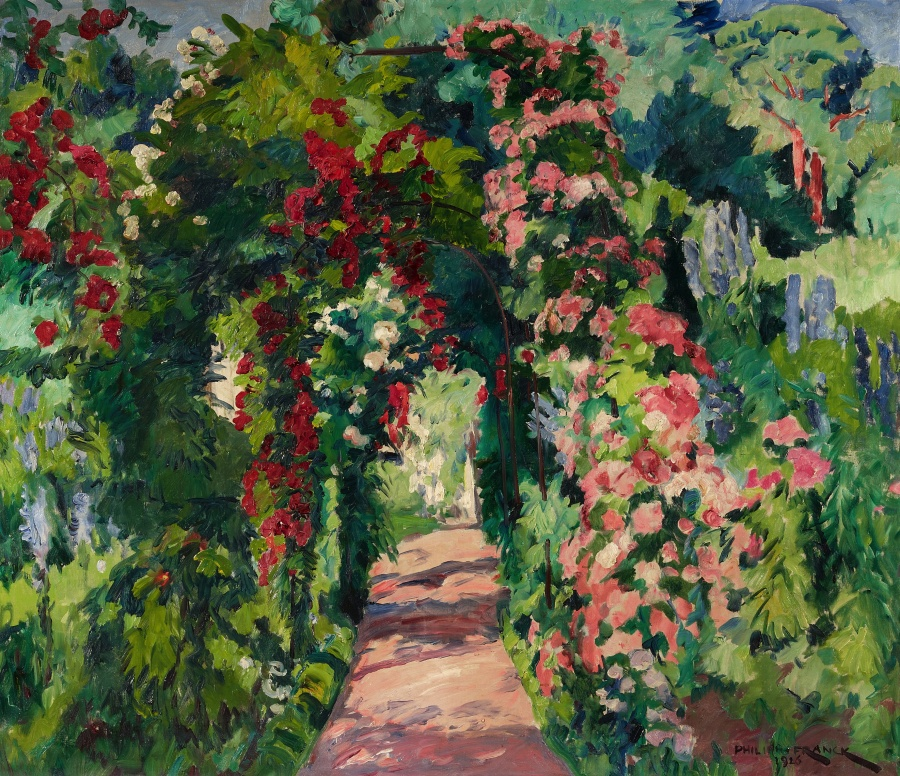
The Garden at Wannsee

Johann Heinrich Philipp Franck (9 April 1860, Frankfurt am Main - 13 March 1944, Berlin) was a German Impressionist painter, graphic artist and illustrator.

== Biography ==
With his father's support, and insistence, he began by studying architecture at the Frankfurt Business College. When his father died, he decided to pursue his true artistic interests. Accordingly, at the age of seventeen, he enrolled at the Städelschule, where he studied with Heinrich Hasselhorst and Eduard Jakob von Steinle. He focused on landscapes but, under Steinle's direction, also created illustrations for fairy tales.

In 1879, he moved to Kronberg im Taunus, where he joined the local artists' colony. While there, he befriended Anton Burger and took lessons with him until 1881. Franck, however, had his own strong opinions on the depiction of nature and went to the Kunstakademie Düsseldorf, where he had been recommended to Jakob Fürchtegott Dielmann. He was there until 1886.

He then began to travel, eventually settling in Würzburg. After finding little success there, he moved to Berlin in 1892 and became a teacher at the Royal Art School. In 1898, he was awarded the title of Professor. That same year, he joined with Lovis Corinth and Max Liebermann to help create the Berlin Secession. In 1902, his first wife died and, two years later, he married one of his students.

In 1906, Franck and his family moved to Halensee on the Wannsee, where he attempted to establish an artists' colony modeled on the one in Kronberg, but was unsuccessful. He returned to Berlin and became Director of the Royal Art School in 1915. In 1928, he participated in the International Exhibition at the Carnegie Institute. His book of reminiscences, Ein Leben für die Kunst (A Life for Art), was published shortly after his death.

== Family ==
His first wife was Katharina Ernst (1866-1902). Two years after her death he married one of his students; Martha Kuhlo (1875-1957). He had four children. From 1906, Franck lived with his family in Berlin-Wannsee. The scientist, Hans Heinrich Franck, was a son from his first marriage. His son from his second marriage, Carl Ludwig Franck, became a noted architect.

The sculptor, Ingeborg Hunzinger (1915-2009) was a granddaughter. The writer Julia Franck is a great granddaughter.
