= Paul Roberts (choreographer) =

English choreographer (1973 – 2025)

- Born: 1972 or 1973; Lincolnshire, England
- Died: 26 September 2025 (aged 52)
- Education: Urdang Academy
- Occupation: Choreographer

Paul Roberts (1973 – 26 September 2025) was an English choreographer. Born in Lincolnshire, Roberts worked for over 25 years, and was best known for his collaborations with Harry Styles.

== Early life and education ==
Roberts was born in Lincolnshire, England. He trained at Urdang Academy, London.

== Career ==
Roberts was a choreographer for over 20 years. He is best known for his work with the English singer Harry Styles, with whom he collaborated since Styles was in the boy band One Direction. He worked with him on several music videos, most prominently "Treat People With Kindness". Roberts was inspired by Stormy Weather for the dance sequence in the video between Styles and Phoebe Waller-Bridge. For the video, he won a MTV Video Music Award. Roberts worked with several artists, including Styles, One Direction, Paul McCartney, Mariah Carey, Bon Jovi, Katy Perry, Annie Lennox, and Gloria Estefan.

== Personal life and death ==
At the time of his death, Roberts was in a relationship with the artist Phil Griffin. He died from cancer on 26 September 2025, at the age of 52.
