= Finsbury Town Hall =

Municipal building in London, England

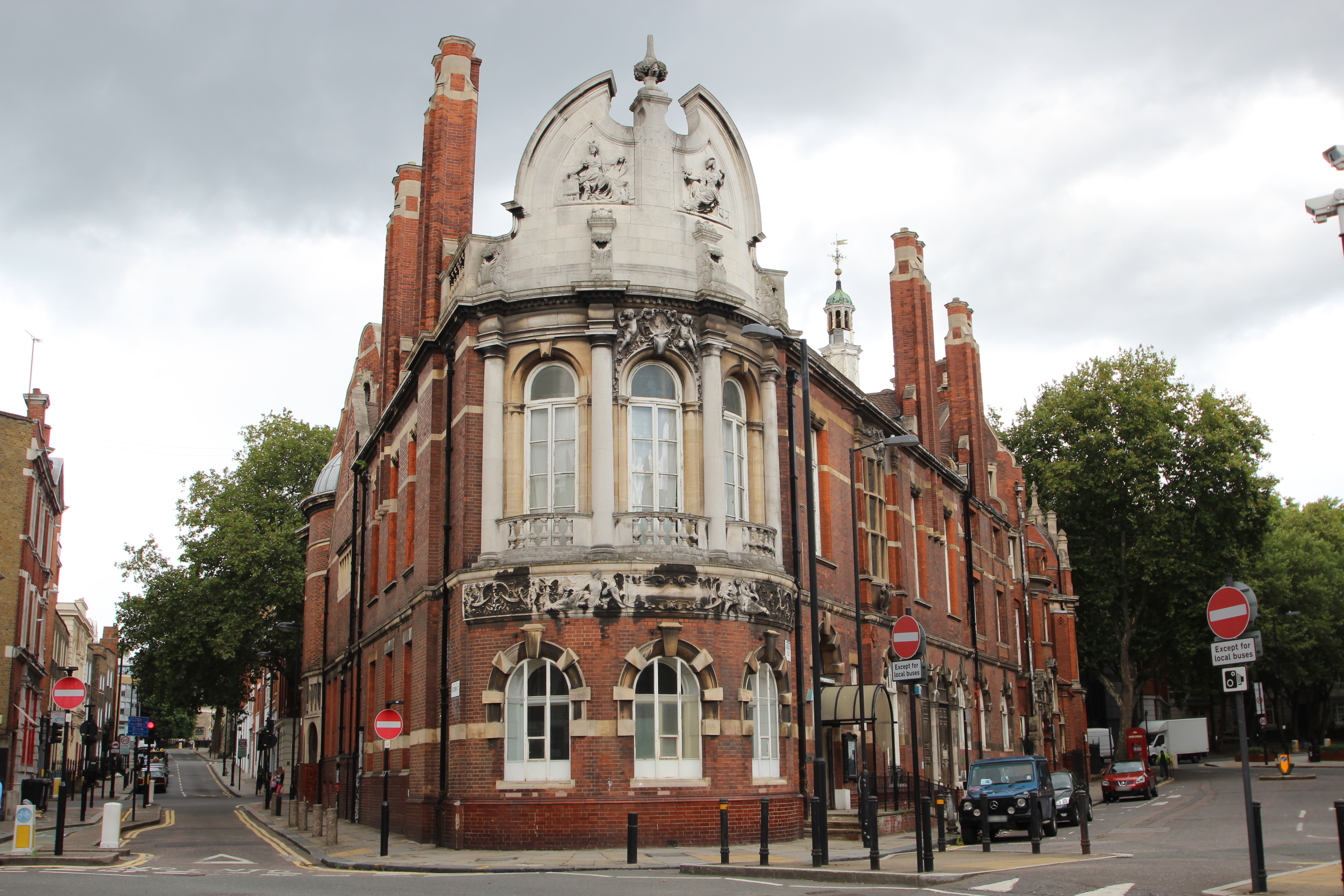
- The town hall in 2014

- Shown in Islington
- 51°31′36.97″N 0°6′29.13″W
- Location: Rosebery Avenue, Finsbury

History
- Built: 1895

Site notes
- Architect: William Charles Evans-Vaughan
- Architectural style: Flemish Renaissance Revival style

Listed Building – Grade II*
- Designated: 29 December 1950
- Reference no.: 1293112

Finsbury Town Hall is a municipal building in Finsbury, London. The structure is a Grade II* listed building.

== History ==
The building was commissioned by the Clerkenwell Vestry to replace an early 19th century vestry hall at the corner of Garnault Place and Rosoman Street which had been described as "the smallest and worst vestry hall in London". The site chosen for the new building was just to the north of the old vestry hall.

The foundation stone for the new building was laid on 14 July 1894. It was designed by William Charles Evans-Vaughan in the Flemish Renaissance Revival style and built by Charles Dearing of Islington; it was officially opened by the Prime Minister, Lord Rosebery, as Clerkenwell Town Hall on 14 June 1895. The design involved an asymmetrical main frontage with nine bays facing onto Rosebery Avenue; the central section featured a projecting cast iron porch flanked by composite order columns on the ground floor; there was an arched opening containing a Venetian window on the first floor and a four small windows on the second floor with a projecting clock above. The clock was by Thwaites & Reed. Internally, the principal rooms were the great hall, which was elaborately decorated in a Belle Époque style, and the council chamber which had a vaulted plaster ceiling supported by Ionic order columns. The great hall was illuminated by sculptures of female figures, known as the "Clerkenwell Angels", which were designed by Jackson & Co. and which supported brass light fittings, made by Vaughan & Brown.

The original vestry hall was demolished in the late 1890s, allowing the new building to be extended to cover the whole area enclosed between Rosebery Avenue, Garnault Place and Rosoman Street. The new building became the headquarters of the enlarged Metropolitan Borough of Finsbury in 1900. During the Second World War an air raid shelter and control centre was built under Garnault Place with access from the town hall; this facility was then maintained as a nuclear fall-out shelter during the Cold War.

The town hall continued to serve as the headquarters of the Metropolitan Borough of Finsbury for much of the 20th century but ceased to be the local seat of government when the enlarged London Borough of Islington was formed in 1965. It subsequently served as a register office and also as a social services centre. In 1993 a plaque was erected outside the town hall to commemorate the life of Sir Dadabhai Naoroji, the first Asian to become a British Member of Parliament.

Islington Council closed the building, because of the rising cost of maintenance, in June 2003. Then, after a programme of restoration works to the designs of RHWL, the town hall re-opened as the home of the performing arts college, Urdang Academy, with the principal rooms used for dancing classes, in January 2007. It remains an approved venue for marriage and civil partnership ceremonies.

== Gallery ==
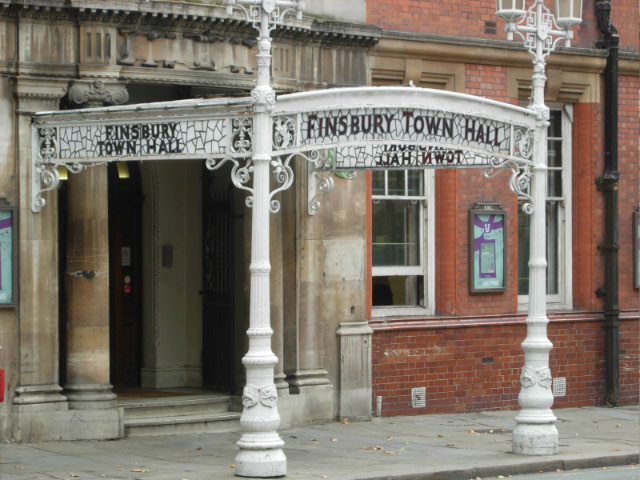
Main entrance on Rosebery Avenue

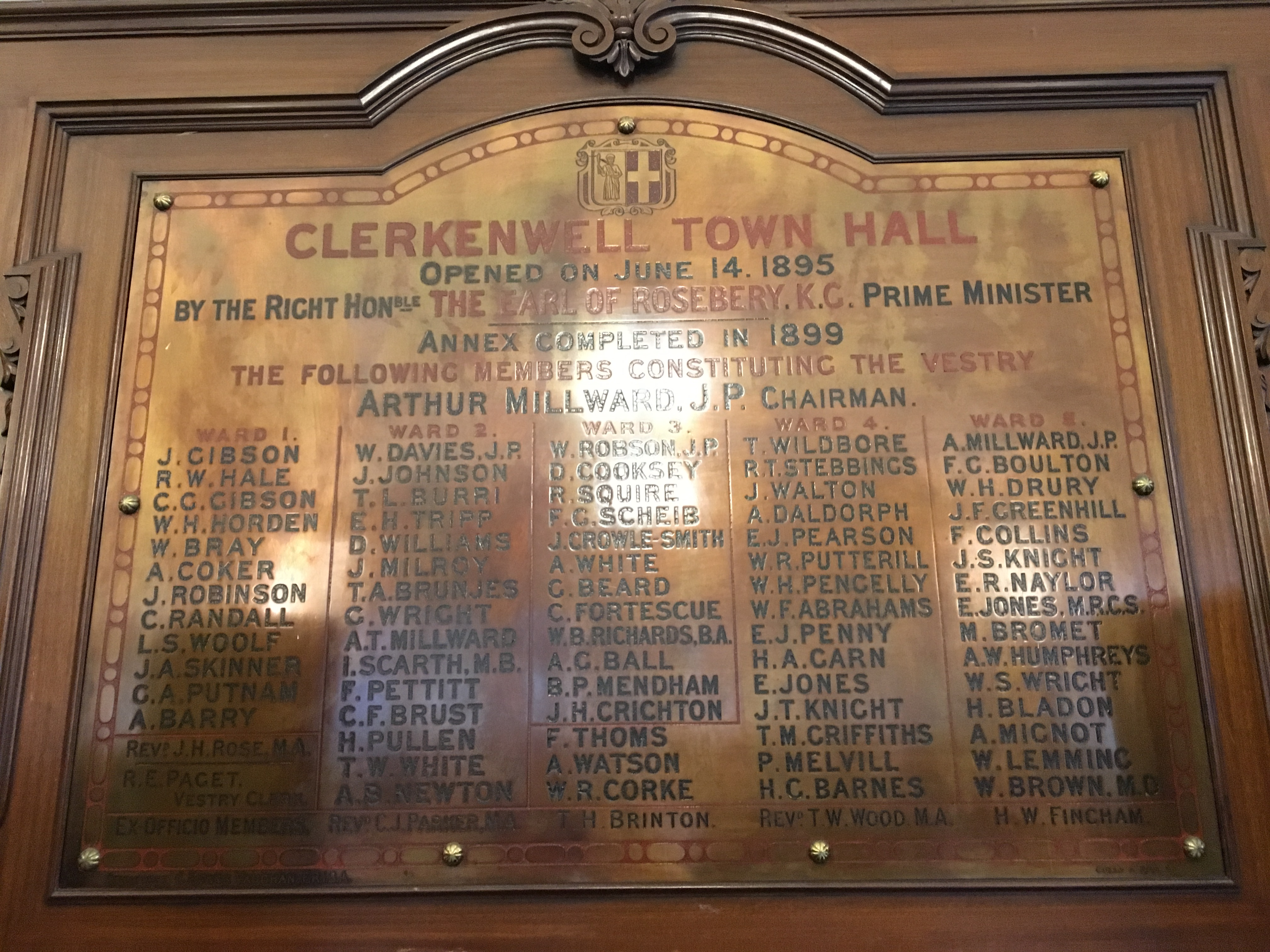
Plaque commemorating the opening of the building

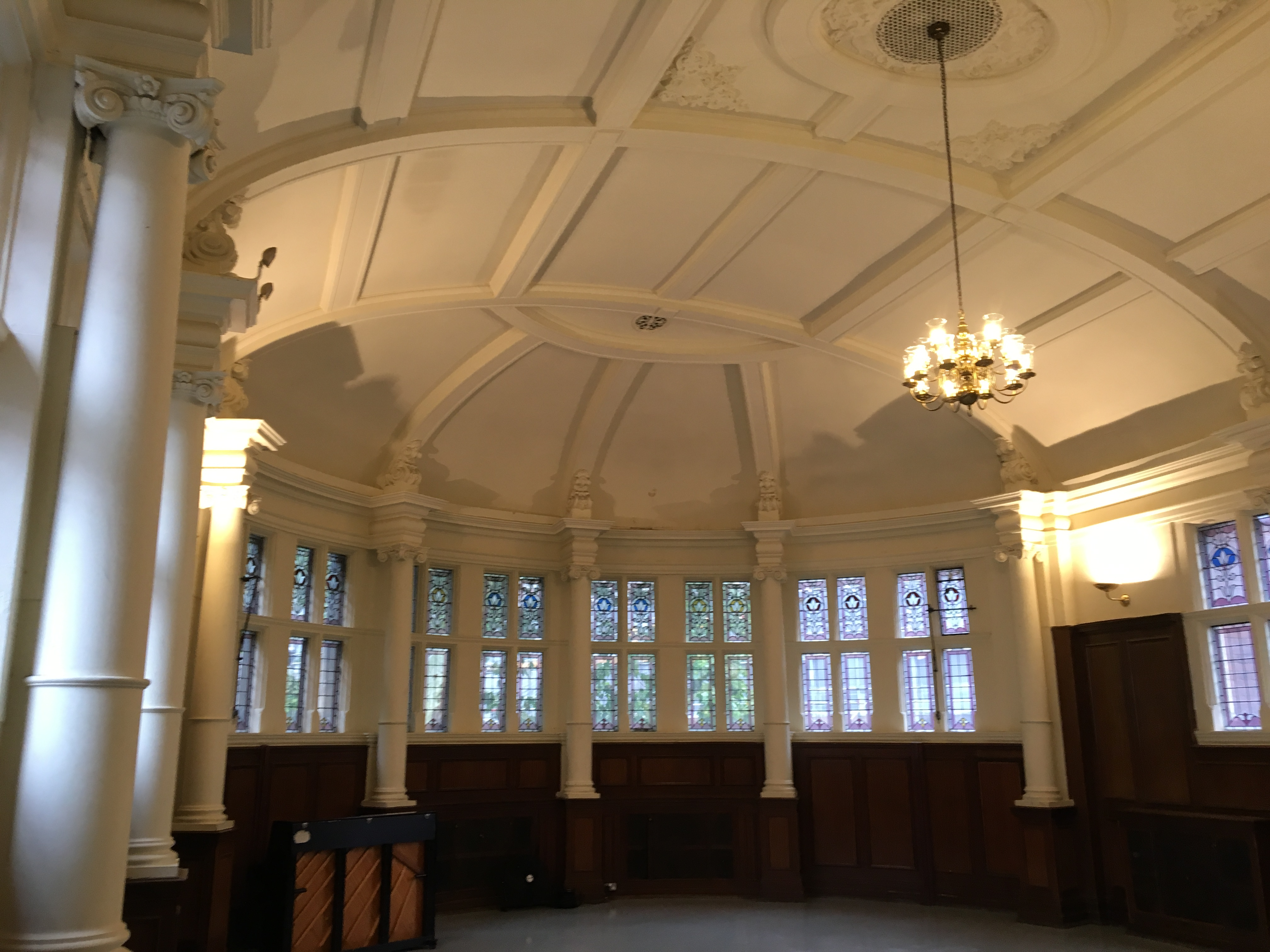
The council chamber

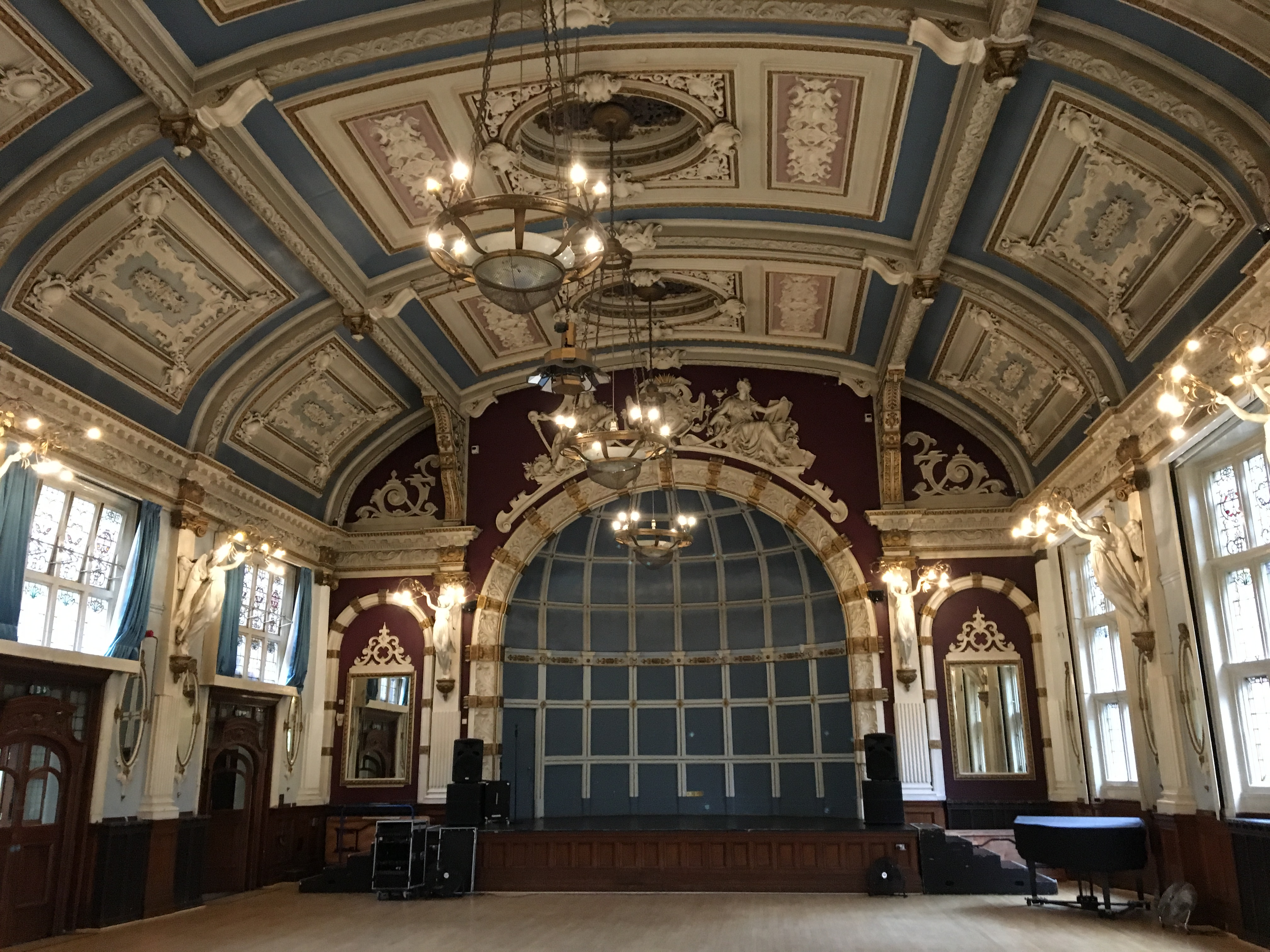
The great hall

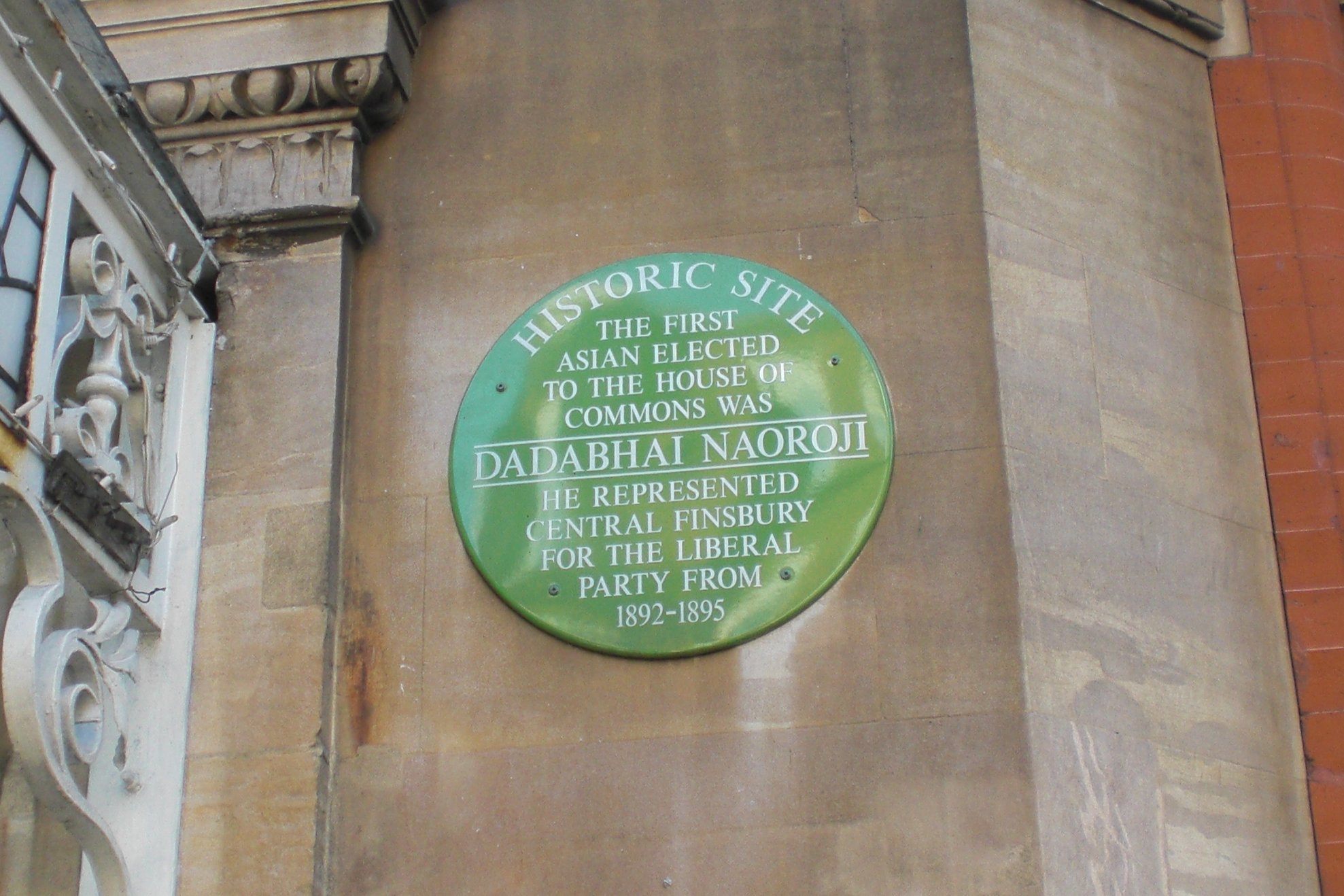
Plaque commemorating the life of Sir Dadabhai Naoroji

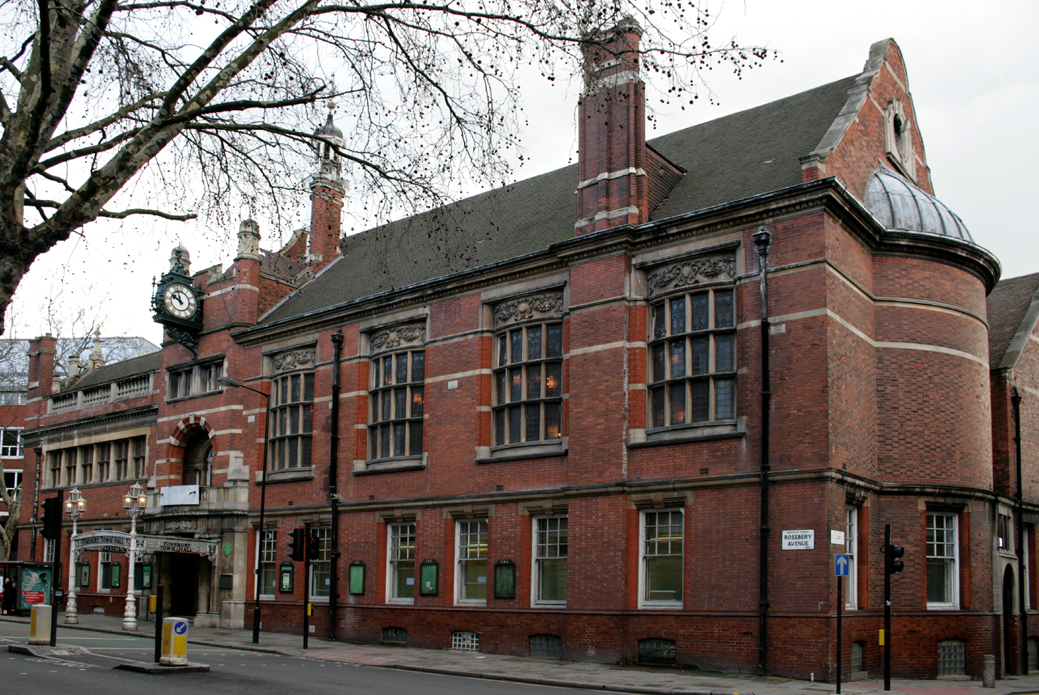
Rosebery Avenue frontage
