= Solange Urdang =

Solange Urdang is a British activist, co-founder of the Black British Theatre Awards (BBTA) and CEO of the Urdang Academy (from 2001 until 2022), founded by her late mother Leonie.

== Personal life ==
Urdang is the daughter of Leonie Urdang, founder of the Urdang Academy in London in 1970. Leonie was originally from Cape Town in South Africa and fled the country in the 1960s because of the consequences of apartheid.

Urdang herself studied at the academy (Lower and Upper Schools) and at the High School of Performing Arts in New York.

On 4 May 2024 she was invested as an Officer of the Most Excellent Order of the British Empire (OBE), recognising her career dedicated to uplifting marginalised communities through the creative arts.

== Urdang Academy ==
Urdang took over the role of CEO of the Urdang Academy from her mother, Leonie, from 2001 until 2022.

Urdang was instrumental in moving the school to the Old Finsbury Town Hall location (from its previous Covent Garden base), its expansion and most recently its acquisition by City University, London.

== The Dang Collective ==
In 2021 Urdang started the Dang Collective, a new Arts and Education Company, focusing on pre-vocational and professional training in dance and musical theatre. The Collective officially launched on 1 August 2022.

== Black British Theatre Awards ==
In 2018 Urdang co-founded the Black British Theatre Awards with Omar F. Okai to recognise black excellence in British theatre. The awards are held yearly since and categories include performers, directors, writers, producers and all the behind the scenes technicians.
