= Urdang Academy =

Urdang

Location
- Rosebery Avenue; London; United Kingdom; 51.527°N 0.1081°W

Information
- Type: Drama School
- Established: 1970; 56 years ago
- Local authority: London Borough of Islington
- Specialist: Performing arts
- Department for Education URN: 50029 Tables
- Ofsted: Reports
- Gender: Mixed
- Age: 17+
- Website: urdang.city.ac.uk

Urdang, previously known as The Urdang Academy, is a performing arts academy based in Islington, London. The school was founded as a ballet school under the direction of Leonie Urdang; after her death her daughter and CEO Solange Urdang succeeded her in 2001, reinventing the school as a performing arts college and remaining director until 2022. In April 2022, Urdang was acquired by City, University of London. Urdang provides specialist vocational training in dance and musical theatre at further and higher education level.

The academy is accredited by the Council for Dance Education and Training and offers Qualifications and Curriculum Authority-recognised qualifications validated by University of Birmingham, Anglia Ruskin University and Trinity College, London. It was rated "Outstanding" by Ofsted in 2011 and again in 2015 as well as being named one of the best places to study degree level musical theatre by The Stage in 2015. The academy was also shortlisted for School of the Year in The Stage 2017 Awards.

== Locations ==
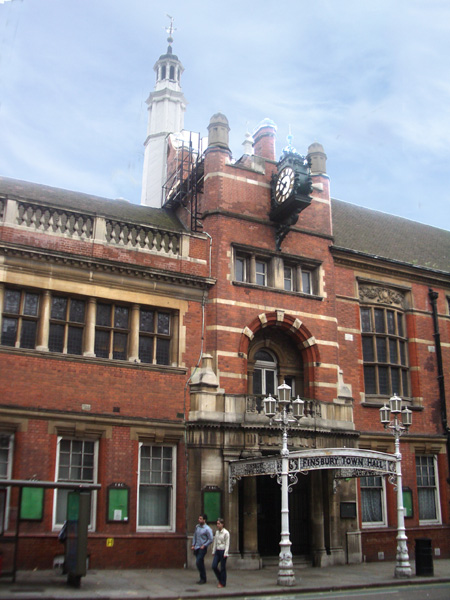
The old Finsbury Town Hall has been the academy's home since 2007

Urdang Academy was originally based in a church hall in Golders Green until 1978, when it moved to studios in Covent Garden. The Old Finsbury Town Hall in Clerkenwell, Islington, has been the home of the Urdang Academy since January 2007, when the school relocated from its Covent Garden premises.

Previously, Urdang was located between The Old Finsbury Town Hall and 'Urdang 2'. After being acquired by City, University of London, Urdang spread across three buildings: The Old Finsbury Town Hall, CitySport and the College Building of City, University of London. 'Urdang 2' was then the home of The Dang Studios up until 2024.

== History ==
Urdang started life as a ballet school in 1970, set up by Leonie Urdang, who was born in Cape Town, South Africa, in 1939 and trained at the University of Cape Town with a particular focus on choreography. She emigrated to the UK in 1961.

Urdang rented space in two church halls to teach ballet students. She later relocated to an old warehouse school in Covent Garden, which was then converted into the Urdang Academy.

After Leonie Urdang's death in 2001, her daughter Solange oversaw the Academy until its acquisition by City, University of London. It is rated Outstanding by Ofsted and accredited by the Council for Dance Education and Training (UK). In 2015, The Stage named Urdang one of the best places to study degree level musical theatre.

== Degree ==
The Urdang offers a Qualifications and Curriculum Authority-recognised qualification. The degree offers a track system to which students will move into in their second year of training. The degree is validated by the City University of London as a

- BA (Hons) in Professional Dance and Musical Theatre
  - Track A: Triple Threat - An equal emphasis in all Musical Theatre Genres
  - Track B: Dance - A greater emphasis on dance
  - Track C: Singer-Actor - A greater emphasis on singing and acting

Urdang also offers

- BA Commercial Dance

== Accreditation ==
Urdang Academy is an Accredited School of the Council for Dance, Drama and Musical Theatre (CDMT) and is an Approved Dance Centre by the Imperial Society of Teachers of Dancing (ISTD).

== Notable alumni ==
- Amber Davies, actress and television personality
- Victoria Hamilton-Barritt, actress.
- Max Harwood, actor
- Jarnéia Richard-Noel, actress and singer
- Paul Roberts, choreographer
- Bambie Thug, singer and dancer
- Errollyn Wallen, composer and musician, Master of the King's Music
- Holly Weston, actress
