= 1899 Clerkenwell Vestry election =

1899 UK local government election

- 16 May 1899

24 of 72 seats to the Clerkenwell Vestry
	First party	Second party
	MOD	PRO
Party	Moderate	Progressive

The final election to the Clerkenwell Vestry took place on Tuesday 16 May 1899. Vestrymen were elected for three years (to go out of office in 1902). The term was reduced to end on 1 November 1900 by the London Government Act 1899.

== Background ==
In 1899 there were 24 of the 72 seats up for re-election:

- Ward No. 1, 4 seats (out of 12)
- Ward No. 2, 5 seats (out of 15)
- Ward No. 3, 4 seats (out of 12)
- Ward No. 4, 6 seats (out of 18)
- Ward No. 5, 5 seats (out of 15)

== Results ==
The results were as follows:

=== Ward No. 1 ===
Ward No. 1
Party	Candidate	Votes	%	±%
Moderate	George Bassett	154		
Moderate	William Bray	139		
Moderate	James Hurrell	115		
Moderate	Samuel Richards	114		
Progressive	G. J. Brailey	114		
Ind. Labour Party	John Penny	92		
Ind. Labour Party	Edwin Davie	84		
Ind. Labour Party	F. Wyard	83		
Turnout				

Richards and Brailey each received 114 votes and resolved the election by drawing lots.

=== Ward No. 2 ===
Ward No. 2
Party	Candidate	Votes	%	±%
	Charles Brust	unopposed		
	George Herbert-Burns	unopposed		
	Arthur Millward	unopposed		
	Frederick Pettit	unopposed		
	John Robinson	unopposed		
Turnout				

=== Ward No. 3 ===
Ward No. 3
Party	Candidate	Votes	%	±%
	George Beard	unopposed		
	Charles Fortescue	unopposed		
	Henry Garn	unopposed		
	Benjamin Mendham	unopposed		
Turnout				

=== Ward No. 4 ===
Ward No. 4
Party	Candidate	Votes	%	±%
Moderate	Frederick Stuart	338		
Moderate	Edwin Penny	302		
Progressive	Henry Pengelly	294		
Progressive	Henry Mundy	283		
Moderate	Edward Pearson	278		
Moderate	Walter Abrahams	275		
Progressive	H. G. Beeney	268		
Moderate	A. Noone	267		
Moderate	W. R. Corke	266		
Progressive	C. Townend	263		
Progressive	R. Jones	227		
Social Democratic Federation	W. E. Lavalette	115		
Independent	W. B. Jones	111		
Independent	M. M. Hanly	64		
Turnout				

=== Ward No. 5 ===
Ward No. 5
Party	Candidate	Votes	%	±%
Moderate	James Knight	181		
Moderate	Charles Fox	176		
Progressive	Peter Pratt	158		
Moderate	William Schultz	149		
Moderate	Thomas Dickson	143		
Progressive	F. Cox	141		
Moderate	E. Hills	138		
Progressive	Hanly	24		
Progressive	D. Lloyd	19		
Turnout				
