= Clerkenwell Workhouse =

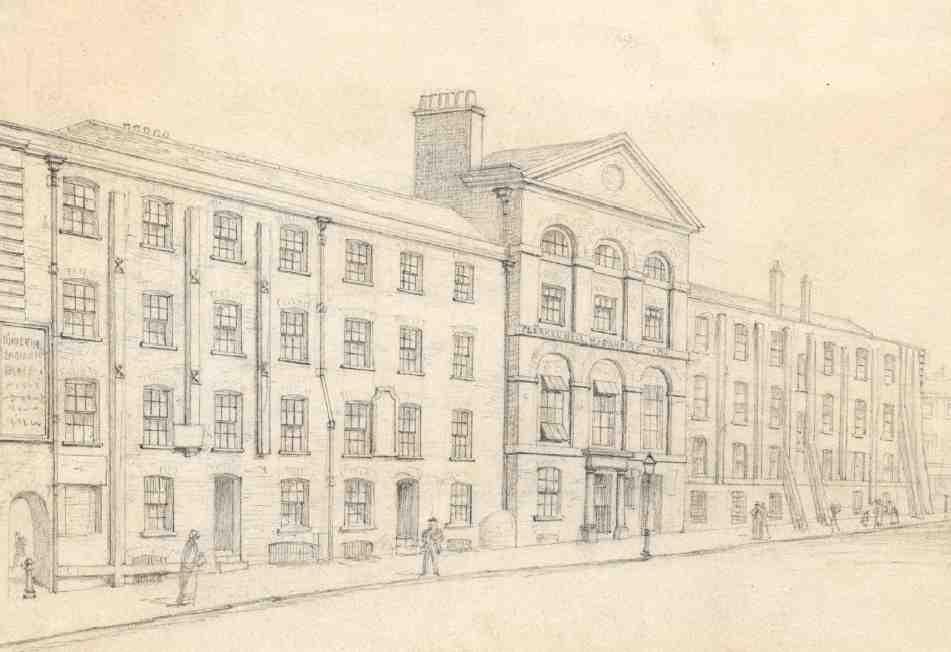
- Clerkenwell Workhouse in 1882
- Interactive map of the Clerkenwell Workhouse area

General information
- Status: Demolished
- Type: Workhouse
- Location: Clerkenwell, England
- Coordinates: 51.5239°N 0.1094°W
- Completed: 1727
- Demolished: 1883
- Client: Clerkenwell Vestry

The Clerkenwell Workhouse stood on Coppice Row, Farringdon Road, in London, from 1727 to 1883.

== History ==
The original workhouse was built in 1727 by the Clerkenwell Vestry. An infirmary was added in 1729.

In 1775, following the Clerkenwell (Poor Relief) Act 1775, responsibility for the workhouse passed to the Clerkenwell Guardians, who were appointed for life by the vestry. The building was replaced by one twice as large in 1790.

The workhouse infirmary was described by The Lancet in 1865 as one of the two worst in London, and "fit for nothing but to be destroyed". Following the Metropolitan Poor Act 1867, responsibility passed to the Holborn Guardians. The building was demolished in 1883.
