= Stephen Samuel Stratton =

English music critic, organist and author (1840–1906)

Stephen Samuel Stratton (19 December 1840 – 25 June 1906) was an English music critic, organist and author.

== Life ==
He was born in London on 19 December 1840. He was a chorister at St. Mary's Church, Ealing and studied music under Charles Lucas.

He arrived in Birmingham in 1866 and became music critic to the Birmingham Post in 1877, holding the post until his death. He was also a frequent contributor to the London Musical Press. He was the joint author with James Duff Brown of British Musical Biography published in 1897.

== Appointments ==
- Organist of St. Mary the Virgin, Soho, London
- Organist of St. James' Church, Friern Barnet
- Organist of St Bartholomew's Church, Edgbaston, Birmingham 1867–1875
- Organist of St. John's Church, Harborne 1875–1878
- Organist of the Church of the Saviour, Birmingham 1878–1882

== Publications ==
- Stratton, Stephen S. (1882–1883). "Woman in Relation to Musical Art". Proceedings of the Musical Association. 9th Sess: 115–146. JSTOR 765220.
- British Musical Biography, with James Duff Brown
- The Life of Mendelssohn
- Nicolo Paganini: His Life and Work
