= Bromley Borough Libraries Service =

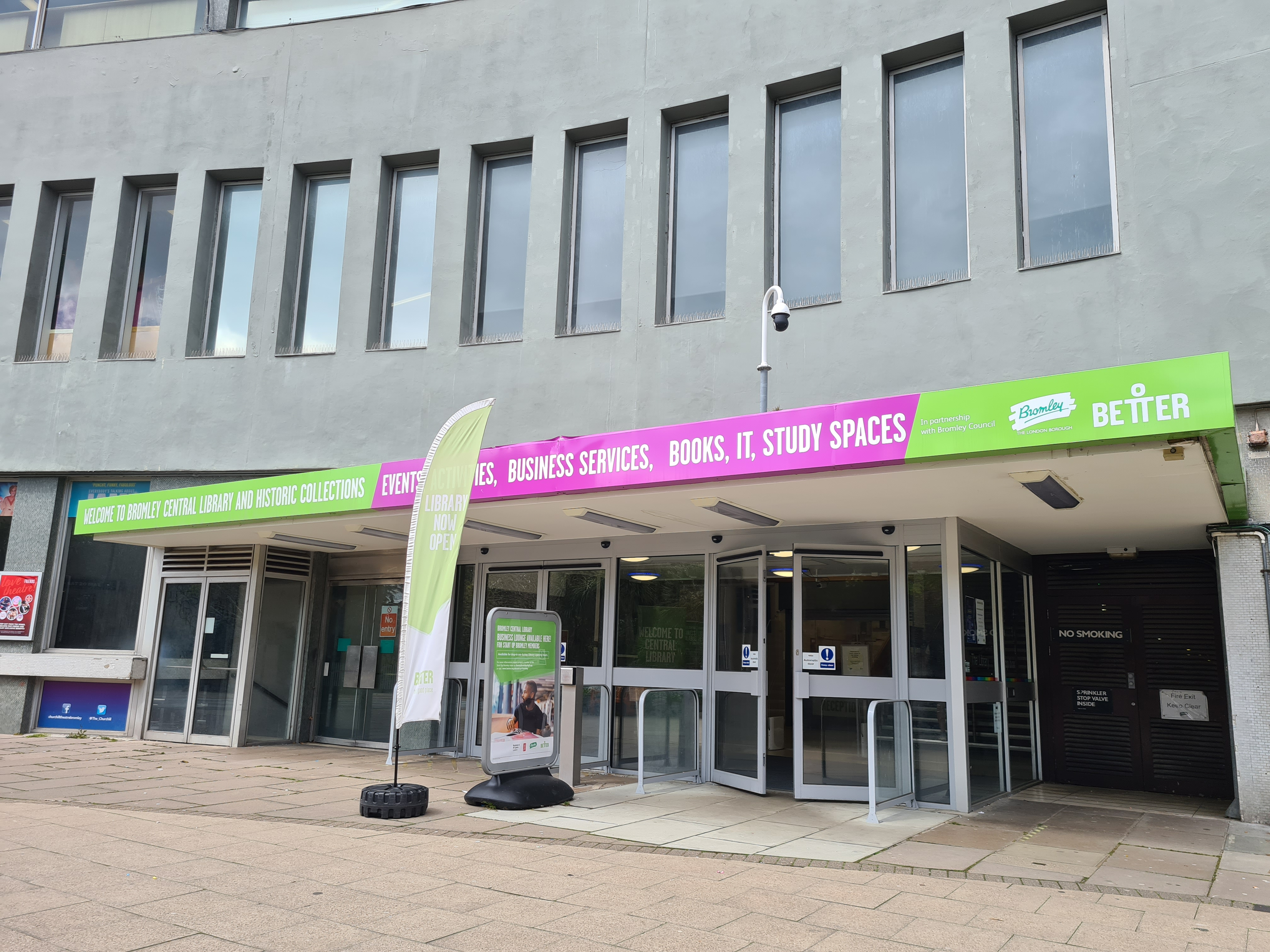
Bromley Central Library (entrance pictured in 2023) is the largest of the libraries offered by the service

The Bromley Borough Libraries Service consists the libraries service for the London Borough of Bromley. The service consists of 14 public libraries, currently operated by social non-profit Greenwich Leisure Limited under their trademark Better, who also manage the volunteer-run home libraries service.

== The libraries ==
Bromley Borough contains 14 libraries, not including the home libraries service:

- Bromley Central Library (also known as simply "Bromley" Library)
- Beckenham Library
- Orpington Library
- Petts Wood Library
- Penge Library
- Chislehurst Library
- Biggin Hill Memorial Library and Pool
- West Wickham Library
- Shortlands Library
- Burnt Ash Library
- Hayes Library
- Mottingham Library
- St Paul's Cray Library
- Southborough Library

== Services outsourcing and strike action ==
Prior to 2017, the Bromley libraries were directly administered by the local council.

In 2015, it was announced that due to council budget cuts, plans were under consideration to transition several of the libraries from a council-staffed to a volunteer-run model. The affected "smaller" libraries consisted Burnt Ash, Hayes, Mottingham, Shortlands, Southborough and St Paul's Cray under these plans. The larger libraries and core services were also being considered for outsourcing. These privatization plans triggered criticism and strike action from current Bromley libraries staff in 2016.

In July 2017, Bromley council announced that Greenwich Leisure Ltd. had been awarded a ten-year contract to operate the libraries service in cooperation with the council, and would take control of all library services as opposed to the split model proposed in the 2015 plans. This handover came into effect in November 2017, and also resulted in the departure of Bromley's libraries from the London Libraries Consortium, ending cross-borrowing with other London boroughs in the LLC.

Following the handover to Greenwich Leisure Ltd., a dispute with former council staff over pay resulted in strike action from the union Unite, amid broader criticism of the council's privatization policies. The strike action began on March 28 of 2018, and involved 36 workers, ending in April after three weeks when a new agreement was reached between staff and Greenwich Leisure Ltd. A further staff strike in March 2024 gained workers an increase in sick pay but the union remained in dispute over pay as well as conditions for zero hour workers.
