= Clerkenwell Vestry =

London parish authority, before 1900

Type
- Type: Vestry of the parish of Clerkenwell

History
- Founded: c.16th century
- Disbanded: 1900
- Succeeded by: Finsbury Metropolitan Borough Council

Structure
- Seats: 72 vestrymen
- Committees: 1775–1869: Appointed 63 members to Clerkenwell Guardians; 1888–1898: Appointed 9 members to Clerkenwell Library Commissioners
- Joint committees: 1855–1889: Appointed 1 member to Metropolitan Board of Works
- Length of term: 3 years
- Constituencies: 1855–1900: 5 wards

Elections
- Last election: 16 May 1899

Meeting place
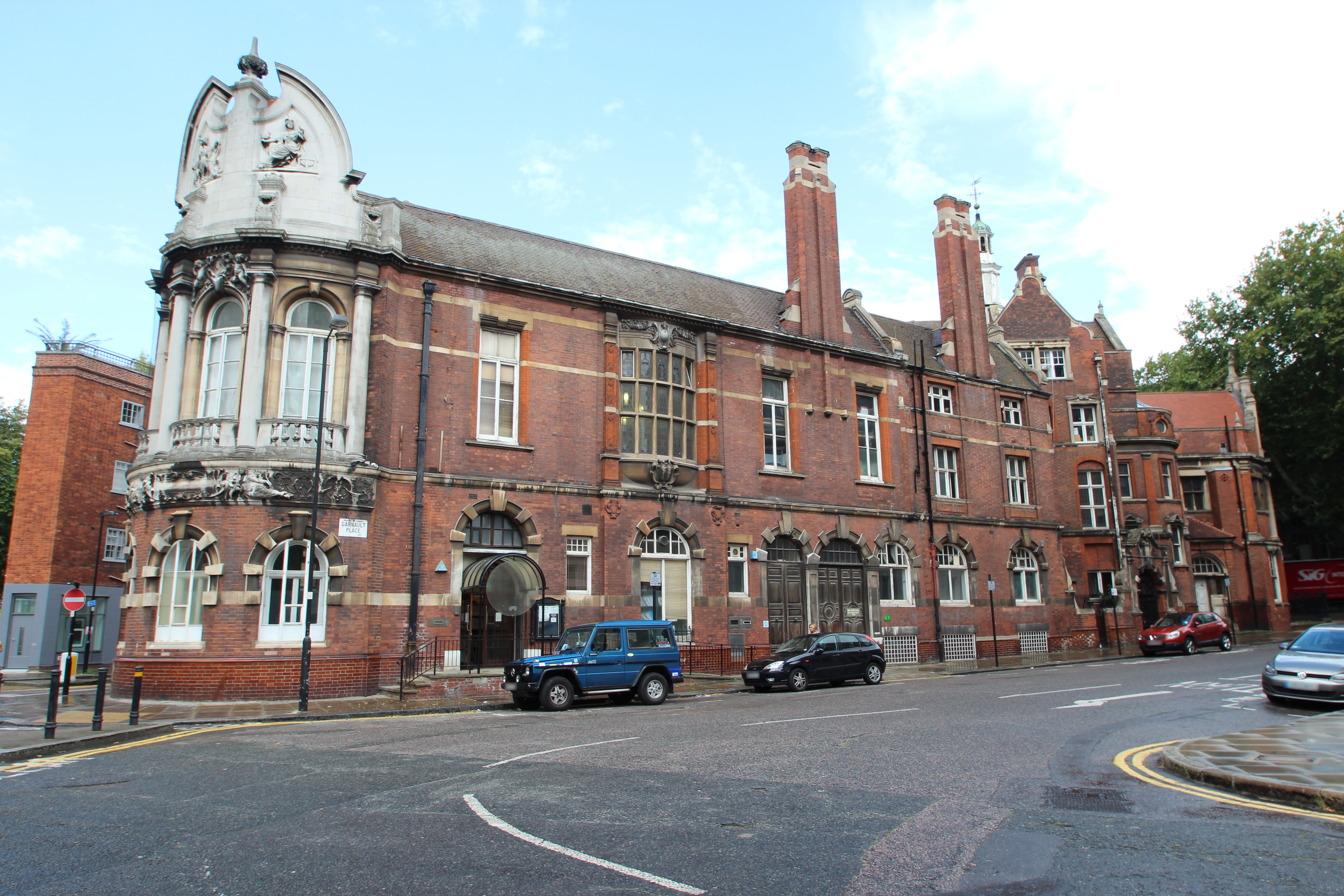
- Vestry Hall, Rosebery Avenue

The Clerkenwell Vestry was the vestry of Clerkenwell from c.16th century until 1900. The vestry had growing secular authority over the parish with the relief of the poor its main responsibility. It was incorporated in 1855 as an administrative vestry within the Metropolitan Board of Works area, with local government and sanitary rights and responsibilities added over time.

The poor sanitation of the Clerkenwell Workhouse infirmary led to the removal of poor law functions in 1869. The vestry was a pioneer in public library provision with the open shelf system introduced for the first time by librarian James Duff Brown. The vestry was replaced by Finsbury Metropolitan Borough Council in 1900 with the final election to the vestry occurring on 16 May 1899. The vestry hall built towards the end of its tenure became the Finsbury Town Hall.

== History ==
The vestry had growing secular authority over the parish of Clerkenwell, including the detached part around Muswell Hill, from the 16th century.

Arthur Millward, Chairman of the Vestry in 1899, officially unveileing the Pluto Hot Water Lamp at the junction of Exmouth Market and Rosebery Avenue

=== Poor law ===
The vestry built the Clerkenwell Workhouse in Coppice Row in 1727. An infirmary was added in 1729. The administration of the poor law was reformed by the Clerkenwell (Poor Relief) Act 1775 which transferred responsibility from the vestry to the Clerkenwell Guardians. The board of 63 guardians were appointed by the vestry for life. They were made up of 42 for the district of St James and 21 for the district of St John. The guardians were empowered to improve the existing workhouse and could also build another one.

The 1775 legislation allowed the vestry to avoid the reforms of the New Poor Law. As part of an investigation into the sanitary condition of workhouse infirmaries, The Lancet in 1865 described the Clerkenwell infirmary as the worst in London. In 1869 responsibility for the poor law passed to the Holborn Guardians, following the Metropolitan Poor Act 1867.

=== Incorporated vestry ===
In 1855 the parish of Clerkenwell came within the area of responsibility of the Metropolitan Board of Works. The Clerkenwell Vestry was incorporated as local government body and appointed one member to the Metropolitan Board of Works. In 1857 the medical officer of health appointed by the vestry reported on the poor state of sanitation in the parish.

The vestry considered adopting the Baths and Washhouses Act 1846 in the 1850s and 1870s, but this was not acted upon. Using the powers of the Sanitary Act 1866, in 1876 a mortuary and in 1877 a coroner's court designed by Henry Saxon Snell was opened by the vestry.

In 1892/3 the vestry had an expenditure of £33,236 (equivalent to £3,692,532 in 2025).

The election of vestrymen was reformed by the Local Government Act 1894 with the vestry election in December 1894 the first to use the new system. The 1894 election was for all members with the third elected with the fewest votes retiring in 1896, then the next third in 1897 and the third with the most votes in 1898.

The vestry did not adopt the Electric Lighting Acts and electric power in Clerkenwell was provided by the County of London Electric Supply Company. The vestry turned down an offer to take over supply in the parish in 1893.

=== Public libraries ===
In October 1887, at a public meeting to discuss the possibility of providing a free public library, Frederick Thomas Penton, the MP for Finsbury Central, said he would donate £300 in cash and £600 in books (£900 is equivalent to £102,316 in 2025) matching an earlier donation by the tea merchant Robert Holborn. This was given subject to the parish adopting the Public Libraries Acts. They were adopted on 13 December 1887 with the Clerkenwell Library Commissioners appointed on 26 January 1888.

James Duff Brown, the first librarian, was appointed on 27 September 1888. A temporary newspaper reading room was opened on Tysoe Street on 20 November 1888 and a temporary lending library opened there on 31 March 1889. The first permanent library building opened on Skinner Street on 10 October 1890. Brown was an innovator and the Clerkenwell Library was the first to use the now-common open shelf system. The powers and duties of the library commissioners were absorbed by the vestry on 29 September 1898.

=== Abolition ===
The final vestry election was held in May 1899.

Clerkenwell Vestry was abolished by the London Government Act 1899 with the first election to the replacement Finsbury Metropolitan Borough Council taking place on 1 November 1900.
